= Comparison of orbital launcher families =

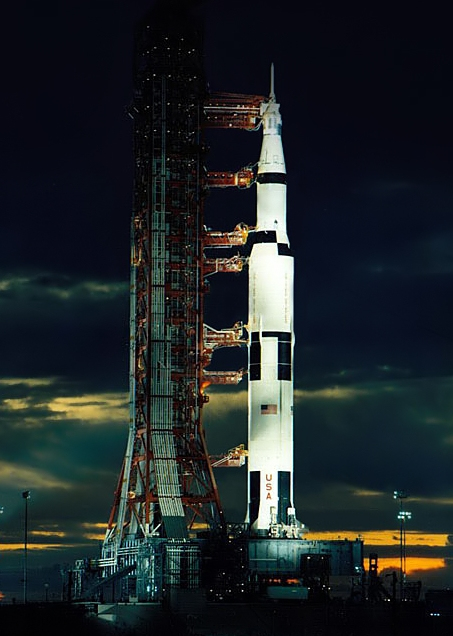
A Saturn V rocket, one of the most powerful operational launch vehicles to date

This article compares different orbital launcher families (launchers which are significantly different from other members of the same 'family' have separate entries). The article is organized into two tables: the first contains a list of currently active and under-development launcher families, while the second contains a list of retired launcher families.

The related article "Comparison of orbital launch systems" lists each individual launcher system within any given launcher family, categorized by its current operational status.

This article does not include suborbital launches (i.e. flights which were not intended to reach LEO or VLEO).

== Description ==
- Family: Name of the family/model of launcher
- Country: Origin country of launcher
- Manufac.: Main manufacturer
- Payload: Maximum mass of payload, for 3 altitudes
  - LEO, low Earth orbit
  - GTO, geostationary transfer orbit
  - TLI, trans-Lunar injection
- Cost: Price for a launch at this time, in millions of US$
- Launches reaching...
  - Total: Flights which lift-off, or where the vehicle is destroyed during the terminal count
    Note: only includes orbital launches (flights launched with the intention of reaching orbit). Suborbital tests launches are not included in this listing.
  - Space (regardless of outcome): Flights which reach approximately 100 km or more above Earth's surface.
  - Any orbit (regardless of outcome): Flights which achieve at least one complete orbit even if the orbit differs from the targeted orbit.
  - Target orbit (without damage to the payload)
- Status: Actual status of launcher (retired, development, active)
- Date of flight
  - First: Year of first flight of first family member
  - Last (if applicable): Year of Last flight (for vehicles retired from service)
- Refs: citations

Same cores are grouped together (like Ariane 1, 2 & 3, but not V).

== List of active and under-development launcher families ==
Legend
Active or undergoing orbital test flights
Under-development

Family		Country/Org.	Manufac.	Payload (kg)			Cost (US$, millions)	Launches reaching...				Status	Date of flight		Notes	Refs
Family		Country/Org.	Manufac.	LEO	GTO	TLI	Cost (US$, millions)	Total	Space	Any orbit	Target orbit	Status	First	Last	Notes	Refs
Agnibaan		IND	AgniKul Cosmos	500	--	--	--					Devel.	NET 2023		Expected launch in 2027	
Alpha		USA	Firefly Aerospace	1,000	—N/a	—N/a	--	7 (Note: Number of Alpha launches current as of 12 March 2026.)	6	5	3	Active	2021			
Angara		RUS	Khrunichev	3,800–35,000	3,600–12,500	--	--	13 (Note: Number of Angara 1.2 + A5 launches current as of 23 April 2026.)	13	13	11	Active	2014			
Antares		USA	Orbital ATK	8,000	--	--	80	18 (Note: Number of Antares launches current as of 02 August 2023.)	17	17	17	Active (Note: The only currently available version, Antares 230+, has only one launch planned, in July 2023. After that, the development period will follow.)	2013		Cygnus launcher. Var.: 110, 120, 130, 230, 230+, 330	
Ariane 6		FRA; ESA	ArianeGroup	21,650 (A64 var.)	11,500+ (A64 var.)	8,500 (A64 var.)	115	9 (Note: Number of Ariane 6 launches current as of 27 August 2026.)	9	9	9	Active	2024		Var.: Ariane 62, Ariane 64.	
Astra Rocket		USA	Astra	50–150 (to SSO)	—N/a	—N/a	--	7 (Note: Number of Astra launches current as of 12 June 2022.)	4	2	2	Active	2020		2 suborbital test launches in 2018.	
AS-1		CHN	Astrostone/Yushi Space	15,700; 10,000 (reusable)	--	--	--	0				Devel.	Q1 2027		Planned reusable methalox launcher	
Atlas V		USA	ULA	18,850	8,900	2,807	109–153	110 (Note: Number of Atlas V launches current as of 2 July 2026)	110	110	110	Active (Note: All remaining planned launches are sold.)	2002	2029 (planned)	Launched Juno & New Horizons	
Blue Whale 1		ROK	Perigee Aerospace	170 (to SSO)	--	--	--	0				Devel.	NET 2024			
Ceres		CHN	Galactic Energy	400 (LEO); 300 (SSO) (Ceres-1)	--	--	--	26 (Note: Number of Ceres-1/Ceres-2 launches current as of 6 November 2026.)	24	23	23	Active	2020		Var.: Ceres-1, Ceres-1S	
Ceres		CHN	Galactic Energy	1,600 (LEO); 1,300 (500 km SSO) (Ceres-2)	--	--	--	26	24	23	23	Active	2020		Var.: Ceres-2	
Chollima-1		DPRK	NADA	~300	--	--	--	4 (Note: Number of Chollima-1 launches current as of 27 May 2024.)	2	1	1	Active	2023		UDMH/N2O4 fueled carrier	
Cyclone-4M		UKR	Yuzhnoye; Yuzhmash	5,000	1,000	--	--	0				Devel.	unknown			
Electron		NZ; USA	Rocket Lab	225			6	91 (Note: Number of Electron launches current as of 14 November 2026.) (Note: NOTE: the numbers here exclude suborbital launches.)	91	87	87	Active	2017			
Epsilon		JPN	IHI Corporation	1,200	--	--	--	6 (Note: Number of Epsilon launches current as of 12 October 2022.)	6	5	5	Active	2013			
Eris		AUS	Gilmour Space Technologies	305	--	--	--	1 (Note: Number of Eris launches current as of 29 July 2025)	0	0	0	Active	2025			
Falcon	Falcon 9	USA	SpaceX	22,800	8,300	--	61.2	702 (Note: Number of Falcon 9 launches are updated via manual input into "Template:Falcon rocket statistics". Said page was last updated on November 12, 2026.) (Note: One flight put primary but not secondary payload into correct orbit, one rocket and payload were destroyed before launch in preparation for static fire and thus is not counted.)	700	700	699	Active	2010		Var.: v1.0, v1.1, (Note: Upgraded to version 1.1 in 2013.) FT, (Note: Upgraded to version FT in 2015.) Block 4, Block 5. Launcher of crewed Dragon capsule.	
Falcon	Falcon Heavy	USA	SpaceX	63,800	26,700	--	90–150	14 (Note: Falcon rocket statistics template page last updated on November 12, 2026.)	14	14	14	Active	2018		First test launch 2018-02-06	
Gravity-1		CHN	Orienspace	6,500 (LEO); 3,700 (700 km SSO)	--	--	--	4 (Note: Number of Gravity-1 launches current as of 15 September 2026.)	4	4	4	Active	2024		largest solid launcher (3rd stage can be solid/kerolox)	
Gravity-2		CHN	Orienspace	25,600 (LEO); 19,100 (SSO)	7,700	--	--	0				Devel.	2025		kerolox (core), solid (boosters); reusable 1st stage	
GSLV Mark II		IND	ISRO	5,000	2,700	--	--	14 (Note: Number of GSLV Mark II launches current as of 30 October 2026.)	13	12	12	Active	2010			
H3		JPN	Mitsubishi	4,000–28,300 (base-heavy)	7,900–14,800 (base-heavy)	11,900 (heavy)		10 (Note: Number of H3 launches current as of 19 October 2026.)	10	9	8	Active	2023		Var.: 30S, 22S, 32L, 24L, heavy	
Hanbit Nano		ROK	Innospace	90 (500 km SSO)	--	--		1 (Note: Number of Hanbit-Nano launches current as of 23 December 2025.)	0	0	0	Active	2025		Paraffin/LOX 1st stage; Methane/LOX 2nd stage	
Hyperbola-1		CHN	i-Space	300	--	--		8 (Note: Number of Hyperbola-1 launches current as of 29 July 2025.)	6	4	4	Active	2019			
Hyperbola-3		CHN	i-Space	8,500–13,400	--	--		0				Devel.	2025		VTVL	
Jielong 1		CHN	CALT	200 (SSO)	--	--		1 (Note: Jielong 1 launch numbers current as of 17 August 2019.)	1	1	1	Active	2019			
Jielong 3		CHN	CALT	1,600 (500 km SSO)	--	--	--	12 (Note: Jielong 3 launch numbers current as of 5 August 2026.)	12	12	12	Active	2022			
KAIROS		JPN	Space One	250; 150 (SSO)	--	--		3 (Note: Number of KAIROS launches current as of 5 March 2026.)	0	0	0	Active	2024			
Kuaizhou		CHN	Kuaizhou Aerospace	450 (KZ-1A Enhanced)	--	--	--	40 (Note: Number of Kuaizhou launches current as of 17 September 2026.) (Note: Number of Kuaizhou launches excludes a successful suborbital test launch on 17 March 2012.)	38 (Note: According to cited ref, a KZ-11 3rd stage failed to ignite during the launch on 10 July 2020; also, the KZ-1A launch on 12 September 2020 experienced a 4th-stage failure. Both launches likely reached space.)	36	36	Active	2013		Var.: KZ-1, KZ-1A	
Kuaizhou		CHN	Kuaizhou Aerospace	1,500 (KZ-11)	--	--	--	40	38	36	36	Active	2013		Var.: KZ-11	
Kuaizhou		CHN	Kuaizhou Aerospace	20,000 (KZ-6, planned 2027)	--	--	--	40	38	36	36	Active	2013		Var.: KZ-6; reusable methalox 1st stage	
Kuaizhou		CHN	Kuaizhou Aerospace	10,000 (KZ-12, planned 2027)	--	--	--	40	38	36	36	Active	2013		Var.: KZ-12; solid 1st stage, liquid methalox upper stage	
LauncherOne		USA	Virgin Orbit	300 (SSO)	--	--	--	6 (Note: LauncherOne launch numbers current as of 9 January 2023.)	5	4	4	Susp. (Note: The parent company suspended operations and declared bankruptcy)	2020			
Lijian-1 (Kinetica-1)		CHN	CAS Space	1,500 (500 km SSO)	--	--	--	16 (Note: Lijian-1 launch numbers current as of 20 September 2026.)	16	15	15	Active	2022		solid fueled carrier	
Lijian-2 (Kinetica-2)		CHN	CAS Space	12,000 (LEO); 8,000 (500 km SSO)	--	--	--	2 (Note: Lijian-2 launch numbers current as of 3 November 2026.)	2	2	2	Active	2026		kerolox LV. reusable 1st stage	
Long March 2–3–4 (DF-5)		CHN	CALT+SAST	12,000	5,500	3,300		534 (Note: Number of Long March 2-3-4 family launches current as of 18 November 2026.) (Note: The total number of launches in the CZ-2,3,4 series listed here does not include 6 possible launches [5 possilbe successes and 1 possible failure] of the CZ-2C (3) var. noted in reference.)	528 (Note: Sources from List of Long March launches are unclear regarding whether 3 failed launches in the CZ-2,3,4 series reached space; thus the number quoted here is the minimum number of launches that reached space while the actual possible number could be greater than the quoted number by up to three.)	524	516	Active	1971	See notes	Var.: 2A, 2C, 2D, 2E, 2F, (Note: CZ-2F is the crew-rated launcher for the Shenzhou spacecraft.) 3, 3A, 3B, 3B/E, 3C, 4A, 4B, 4C. See (Note: As of 21 February 2020, the following var. in the Long March 2-3-4 family of launchers have been retired: 2A, 2E, 3, 3B, and 4A.) for retired var. among those listed here.	
Long March 5		CHN	CALT	--	14,000	8,000	--	18 (Note: Number of Long March 5 family launches current as of 11 June 2026.)	18	17	17	Active	2016		Var.: CZ-5	
Long March 5		CHN	CALT	25,000	--	--	--	18	18	17	17	Active	2016		Var.: CZ-5B	
CZ 6–7–8 family	Long March 6	CHN	SAST	1,500 (LEO); 1,080 (700 lm SSO)	--	-5	--	45 (Note: Number of Long March 6 family launches current as of 23 October 2026.)	45	45	45	Active	2015		Var.: 6	
CZ 6–7–8 family	Long March 6	CHN	SAST	4,500 (700 km SSO)	--	--	--	45	45	45	45	Active	2015		Var.: 6A	
CZ 6–7–8 family	Long March 6	CHN	SAST	2,400 (500 km SSO)	--	--	--	45	45	45	45	Active	2015		Var.: 6C	
CZ 6–7–8 family	Long March 7	CHN	CALT	14,000	--	--	--	29 (Note: Number of Long March 7 family launches current as of 10 August 2026.)	27	27	27	Active	2016		Var.: 7	
CZ 6–7–8 family	Long March 7	CHN	CALT	--	7,000	--	--	29	27	27	27	Active	2016		Var.: 7A	
CZ 6–7–8 family	Long March 8	CHN	CALT	4,500 (SSO)	2,800	> 1,200	--	20 (Note: Number of Long March 8 family launches current as of 20 November 2026.)	20	20	20	Active	2020		Var.: 8	
CZ 6–7–8 family	Long March 8	CHN	CALT	7,000 (700 km SSO)	--	--	~ $36.1 million (245.2 million RMB)	20	20	20	20	Active	2020		Var.: 8A	
Long March 9		CHN	CALT	150,000	--	50,000	--	0				Devel.	2033		partly-reusable Super-Heavy carrier	
Long March 10		CHN	CALT	70,000 (CZ-10)	--	27,000 (CZ-10)	--	1 (Note: Number of Long March 10 family launches current as of 10 July 2026.)	1	1	1	Active	2026		Human-rated; Var.: 10 (3-core, TLI)	
Long March 10		CHN	CALT	14,000 (CZ-10A, reusable); 18,000 (CZ-10A, expendable)	--	--	--	1	1	1	1	Active	2026		Human-rated; Var.: 10A (1-core, LEO, partly reusable)	
Long March 10		CHN	CALT	16,000 (CZ-10B, reusable)	--	--	--	1	1	1	1	Active	2026		Commercial; Var.: 10B (partly reusable)	
Long March 10		CHN	CALT	22,000 (CZ-10C, reusable); 27,000 (CZ-10C, expendable)	--	--	--	1	1	1	1	Active	2026		Commercial, all-methalox Var.: 10C (partly reusable)	
Long March 11		CHN	CALT	1,000	--	--	--	18 (Note: Number of Long March 11 family launches current as of 08 November 2025.)	18	18	18	Active	2015		Likely based on DF-31 missile	
Long March 12		CHN	SAST/CACL	12,000 (LEO); 6,000 (700 km SSO)	--	--	--	12 (Note: Number of Long March 12 family launches current as of 8 November 2026.)	12	12	12	Active	2024		Var. 12 (kerolox LV, 3.8 metres diameter)	
Long March 12		CHN	SAST/CACL	~5,000 (700 km SSO); CZ-12A	--	--	--	12	12	12	12	Active	2024		Var.: 12A (reusable CH_{4} / LOX launcher)	
Long March 12		CHN	SAST/CACL	~20,000 (LEO, expended); ~12,000 (LEO, 1st stage recovered); ~12,000 (500 km SSO, expended); CZ-12B	--	--	--	12	12	12	12	Active	2024		Var.: 12B (reusable RP-1 / LOX launcher)	
LVM3		IND	ISRO	10,000	4,000	2,180	--	8 (Note: Number of GSLV LVM-3 launches current as of 24 December 2025.) (Note: LVM-3 launch numbers do not include one successful suborbital flight.)	8	8	8	Active	2014		Uprated cryo 2nd stage (C32) and semi-cryo 1st stage (SC120) variants expected	
Maia		FRA	MaiaSpace	500 (SSO)	--	--		0				Devel.	2025		Planned first stage reuse	
Minotaur I		USA	Orbital ATK	580	--	--	--	12 (Note: Number of Minotaur I launches current as of 15 June 2021.)	12	12	12	Active	2000		Derived from the Minuteman II	
Minotaur IV & V		USA	Orbital ATK	1,735	640	447	50	10 (Note: Number of Minotaur IV and V launches current as of 7 April 2026.)	10	10	10	Active	2010		Also 2 suborbital launches (HTV-2a). Var.: IV, IV Lite, IV HAPS, V. Derived from Peacekeeper missile	
Miura 5		ESP	PLD Space	900	--	--		0				Devel.	NET 2024			
MLV		USA	Firefly Aerospace	14,000	--	--	--	0				Devel.	2025			
Nebula-1		CHN	Deep Blue Aerospace	1,000	--	--		0				Devel.	2024		VTVL (first stage)	
Nebula-2		CHN	Deep Blue Aerospace	20,000	--	--		0				Devel.	2025		kerolox; VTVL (first stage)	
Neutron		NZ; USA	Rocket Lab	15,000	--	2,000	50	0				Devel.	2024			
New Glenn		USA	Blue Origin	45,000	13,000	--		4 (Note: Number of New Glenn launches current as of 29 May 2026.)	3	3	2	Active	2025			
New Line 1		CHN	LinkSpace	200 (SSO)	--	--		0				Devel.	unknown			
NGLV (Soorya)		IND	ISRO	30,000	10,000	--	--	0				Devel.	NET 2032		Program approved in 2024	
Nuri		ROK	KARI	1,500	--	--		5 (Note: Number of Nuri launches current as of 7 October 2026.)	5	4	4	Active	2021			
OS-M		CHN	OneSpace	205 (M1)	--	--	--	1 (Note: Number of OS-M launches current as of 27 March 2019.)	0	0	0	Active	2019		Var.: M1, M2, M4. Single M1 failed launch; M2 & M4 in development.	
Pallas-1		CHN	Galactic Energy	5,000; 3,000 (SSO)				1 (Note: Number of Pallas-1 launches current as of 1 September 2026.)	1	1	1	Active	2026		kerolox LV with reusable 1st stage	
Pallas-2		CHN	Galactic Energy	20,000	7,500	--	--	0				Devel.	NET 4th Qt 2026		Var.: 1-core	
Pallas-2		CHN	Galactic Energy	58,000	--	--	--	0				Devel.	NET 4th Qt 2026		Var.: 3-core	
Pegasus		USA	Orbital ATK	450	--	--	--	46 (Note: Number of Pegasus launches current as of 3 July 2026.)	45	43	41	Active	1990			
Pioneer-1 (aka Yuanxingzhe-1 or XZY-1)		CHN	Arrowhead Technology/Space Epoch	6,500 (1,100 km LEO)	--	--		0				Devel.	2025		first stage recovery via ocean landing	
Proton (UR-500)		(Soviet Union) USSR; RUS	Khrunichev	23,000	6,920	5,680	65 (Proton-M)	431 (Note: Number of Proton launches current as of 12 February 2026.)			382	Active	1965		Var.: K, M, Medium in development.	
PSLV		IND	ISRO	3,800	1,200	550	--	64 (Note: Number of PSLV launches current as of 12 January 2026.)	63	60	59	Active	1993		Var.: CA, XL, QL, DL; Launched moon probe Chandrayaan I, Mars probe Mangalyaan I	
Qaem-100		IRN	IRGC	80	--	--	--	3 (Note: Number of Qaem-100 launches current as of 14 September 2024.)	3	2	2	Active	2023		also one successful suborbital launch	
Qased		IRN	IRGC	~50	--	--	--	3 (Note: Number of Qased launches current as of 27 September 2023.)	3	3	3	Active	2020			
RFA One		Germany	Rocket Factory Augsburg	1,300	450	--	--	0				Devel.	2024		1st stage combustion in Europe, Orbital Stage.	
Rokot/Strela (UR-100N)		RUS	Eurockot Khrunichev	2,100	--	--	--	37 (Note: Number of Rokot+Strela launches current as of 26 December 2019.)	36	35	35	Active	1994		34 Rokot launches (no launches post-2019 due to Ukrainian tech ban); 3 Strela launches.	
RS1		USA	ABL Space Systems	1,200	--	--	12	1 (Note: Number of RS1 launches current as of 20 January 2023.)	0	0	0	Active	2023			
Shavit		ISR	IAI	225	--	--	15	13 (Note: Number of Shavit launches current as of 2 September 2025)	11	11	11	Active	1988		Var.: Shavit, -1, -2	
Simorgh		IRN	ISA	350	--	--	--	7 (Note: Number of Simorgh launches current as of 6 December 2024.)	7	2	2	Active	2016			
SK solid fueled TV2		ROK	MND	> 100	--	--	--	1 (Note: Number of TV2 launches current as of 04 December 2023.)	1	1	1	Active	2023		solid fueled launch vehicle	
SLS		USA	Orbital ATK Boeing United Launch Alliance Aerojet Rocketdyne	~95,000	--	~27,000	--	2 (Note: Number of SLS launches current as of 1 April 2026.)	2	2	2	Active	2022		Var.: Block 1 (Blocks 1B, 2 cancelled)	
Soyuz		(Soviet Union) USSR; RUS	RSC Energia TsSKB-Progress	8,200	2,400	1,200	--	2,022 (Note: Number of R-7 Semyorka/Soyuz launches current as of 14 November 2026.)	(Note: Due to the existence of ICBM variants, suborbital flights, and the large total number of flights, the number of launches reaching space and those reaching any orbit are not given here in order to lessen the possible dissemination of inaccurate information.)		1,897 (Note: The total number of launches and launch successes are taken from the List of R-7 launches and from the R-7 Semyorka Wikipedia pages.)	Active	1957		Var.: Sputnik, Luna, Vostok-L, Vostok-K, Voskhod, Molniya, Molniya-L, Molniya-M, Polyot, Soyuz, Soyuz-L, Soyuz-M, Soyuz-U, Soyuz-FG, Soyuz-2, Soyuz-2-1v	
Spectrum		GER	Isar Aerospace	1,000 (LEO); 700 (SSO)	--	--	--	2 (Note: Number of Spectrum launches current as of 5 September 2026.)	1	1	1	Active	2025			
SS-520		JPN	IHI Aerospace	4	--	--	--	2 (Note: Number of SS-520 launches current as of 3 February 2018.)	2	1	1	Active	2017		2 successful suborbital flights and 2 orbital flights (one success). A test of how small orbital rockets can be. The rocket has a mass of only 2.6 tonnes.	
SSLV		IND	ISRO	500	300	--	--	3 (Note: Number of SSLV launches current as of 16 August 2024.)	3	2	2	Active	2022			
Starship		USA	SpaceX	250,000 (expendable)	40,000	100,000+ (With in-orbit refueling)	--	15 (Note: Number of Starship launches current as of 13 November 2026.) (Note: Starship test launches are intended as pseudo-orbital flights (may be considered as suborbital) and so are included in this list for now.)	14	2	2	Active	2023		1st flight intended a TAO orbit; 3rd flight suborbital	
Starship		USA	SpaceX	150,000 (reusable)	40,000	100,000+ (With in-orbit refueling)	--	15	14	2	2	Active	2023		1st flight intended a TAO orbit; 3rd flight suborbital	
Start-1 (RT-2PM)		RUS	MITT	532	--	--	--	7 (Note: Number of Start-1/Start launches current as of 25 April 2006.)	6	6	6	Active	1993			
Taurus / Minotaur-C		USA	Orbital Sciences	1,450	--	--	--	9 (Note: Number of Taurus/Minotaur-C launches current as of 31 October 2017.)	9	6	6	Active	1989		Var.: 2110, 3110, 3210	
Tianlong 2		CHN	Space Pioneer	2,000 (LEO); 1,500 (500 km SSO)	--	--		1 (Note: Number of Tianlong-2 launches current as of 02 April 2023.)	1	1	1	Active	2023		liquid fueled (kerolox) carrier	
Tianlong 3		CHN	Space Pioneer	17,000 (LEO); 14,000 (500 km SSO)	--	--		1 (Note: Number of Tianlong-3 launches current as of 3 April 2026.)	1	0	0	Active	2026		kerolox with reusable 1st stage	
Tronador		(Argentina) ARG	CONAE	500								Devel.	2030			
Unha		DPRK	KCST	200	--	--	--	4 (Note: Number of Unha-2/Unha-3 launches current as of 7 February 2016.)	3	2		Active	2006		Var.: Paektusan based on Taepodong-1 missile; Unha based on Taepodong-2 missile.	
Vega		ITA; FRA; ESA	Avio	2,300	--	--	23	30 (Note: Number of Vega (all versions) launches current as of 15 September 2026.)	29	27	27	Active	2012		Vega, Vega-C, Vega-E in-development.	
Vikram		IND	Skyroot Aerospace	$\leq$720	--	--		1 (Note: Number of Vikram launches current as of 18 July 2026.)	1	1	1	Active	2026		Var.: Vikram 1, Vikram II, Vikram III	
VLM		BRA	CTA	150	--	--	--	0				Devel.	NET 2025			
Vulcan		USA	ULA	17,800–34,900	7,400–16,300	--	99	5 (Note: Number of Vulcan launches current as of 15 November 2026.)	5	4	4	Active	2024			
Yenisei		RUS	TsSKB-Progress; RSC Energia	88,000–115,000		20,000-27,000		0				Devel.	NET 2032			
Zenit		(Soviet Union) USSR; UKR; RUS	Yuzhnoye	13,740	6,160	4,098	--	84 (Note: Number of Zenit launches current as of 26 December 2017.)		74	72	Active	1985		Var.: 2, 2M (2SB, 2SLB), 3SL, 3SLB, 3SLBF	
Zephyr		FRA	Latitude	100	--	--		0				Devel.	2025			
Zero		JPN	Interstellar Technologies	100 (SSO)	--	--		0				Devel.	2023			
Zhihang-1		CHN	Anhui Space Zhihang Technology Co., Ltd.	4,000	--	--	--	0				Devel.	June 2026		Planned kerolox launcher	
Zhuque-2		CHN	LandSpace	4,000 (LEO); 1,500 (500 km SSO) (retired)	--	--		10 (Note: Number of Zhuque-2 launches current as of 14 October 2026.)	10	8	8	Active	2022		Var.: ZQ-2; 1st methalox LV to reach: space (2022), orbit (2023), orbit with payload (12/2023) (ZQ-2 is a developmental-model; it was retired post-2023 in favor of ZQ-2E variant)	
Zhuque-2		CHN	LandSpace	6,000 (LEO); 4,000 (500 km SSO)	--	--		10	10	8	8	Active	2022		Var.: ZQ-2E	
Zhuque-3		CHN	LandSpace	11,800 (expendable); 8,000 (1st stage recovered)	--	--		2 (Note: Number of Zhuque-3 launches current as of 18 August 2026.)	2	2	2	Active	2025		Var.: ZQ-3; methalox carrier	
Zhuque-3		CHN	LandSpace	21,000 (expendable); 12,500–18,300 (1st stage recovered)	--	--		2	2	2	2	Active	2025		Var.: ZQ-3E	
Zuljanah		(Iran) IRN	ISA	220				0				Devel.	NET 2023		Two successful suborbital flights	

== List of retired launcher families ==
Legend
Retired

Family	Country/Orgs.	Manufac.	Payload (kg)			Cost (US$, millions)	Launches reaching...				Status	Date of flight		Notes	Refs
Family	Country/Orgs.	Manufac.	LEO	GTO	TLI	Cost (US$, millions)	Total	Space	Any orbit	Target orbit	Status	First	Last	Notes	Refs
Ariane 1–2–3	FRA; ESA	Aérospatiale	—N/a	2,650	—N/a	--	28				Retired	1979	1989		
Ariane 4	FRA; ESA	Aérospatiale	7,000	4,720	—N/a	--	116				Retired	1988	2003	Var.: 40, 42P, 42L, 44P, 44L, 44LP	
Ariane 5	FRA; ESA	Airbus	21,000	10,735	—N/a	165–220	117	115	115	112	Retired	1996	2023	Var.: G, G+, GS, ECA, ES.	
ASLV	IND	ISRO	150	--	--	--	4	2	2	1	Retired	1987	1994		
Athena I & II	USA	Lockheed ATK	2,065	--	295	--	7				Retired	1995	2001	Launch Lunar Prospector.	
Atlas I (Atlas A-B-C-D-E-F-G)	USA	Lockheed	5,900	2,340	--	--	514				Retired	1957	1997	Launch Mercury. Atlas or Centaur upper stage.	
Atlas II	USA	Lockheed	8,618	3,833	--	--	63	63	63		Retired	1991	2004		
Atlas III	USA	Lockheed	10,759	4,609	--	--	6	6	6		Retired	2003	2005	Var.: IIIA, IIIB	
Black Arrow	UK	RAE Westland	132	--	--	--	4	3			Retired	1969	1971		
Delta	USA	Douglas	3,848	1,312	--	--	186				Retired	1960	1989	Launched Pioneer & Explorer probes. Var. A, B, C, D, E, G, J, L, M, N, 300, 900, 1X00, 4X00, 2X00, 3X00, 5X00	
Delta II	USA	ULA	6,000	2,171	1,508	51	153	152	152	151	Retired	1989	2018	Launched Mars probes MGS to Phoenix; Var.: 6000, 7000, and Heavy.	
Delta III	USA	Boeing	8,290	3,810	--	--	3	2	2		Retired	1998	2000		
Delta IV	USA	ULA	23,040	13,130	9,000	--	45	45	45	44	Retired	2002	2024	Var.: M, M+, and Heavy.	
Diamant	FRA	SEREB	160	--	--	--	12			9	Retired	1965	1975		
Dnepr (R-36M)	UKR; RUS	Yuzhmash	3,600	--	750	14	17				Retired	1999	2015		
Energia	(Soviet Union) USSR	NPO Energia	100,000	20,000	32,000	240 (Energia−Buran)	2	2	1	1	Retired	1987	1988	1 partial failure with Polyus spacecraft, 1 successful flight with Buran shuttle.	
Falcon 1	USA	SpaceX	420	--	--	7.9	5	4	2	2	Retired	2006	2009		
Feng Bao 1 (DF-5)	CHN	SAST	2,500	--	--	--	8			4	Retired	1972	1981	3 successful suborbital flights	
GSLV Mark I	IND	ISRO	5,000	2,500	--	--	6	4	2	2	Retired	2001	2010		
H-I	JPN	Mitsubishi	3,200		--	--	9	9			Retired	1986	1992	License-built version of the Thor-ELT	
H-II, IIA & IIB	JPN	Mitsubishi	19,000	8,000	--	(190), 90, 112	66 (Note: Number of H-II (all versions) launches current as of 28 June 2025.)	65	64	63	Retired	1994	2025	Var.: A202, A2022, A2024, A204, B	
J-I	JPN	IHI Corporation Nissan Motors	880	--	--	--	1				Retired	1996	1996	Partial demonstration flight only	
Kosmos (R-12 & R-14)	(Soviet Union) USSR	Yuzhnoye Polyot	1,500	--	--	12	610			559	Retired	1967	2010	Var.: 1, 2, 3, 3M	
Kaituozhe (DF-31)	CHN	CALT	800	--	--	--	3	1	1	1	Retired (likely)	2002	2017	Var.: KT-1, KT-2, KT2-A	
Lambda 4S	JPN	Nissan ISAS	26	--	--	--	5			1	Retired	1966	1970		
Long March 1	CHN	CALT	300	--	--	--	2	2	2	2	Retired	1970	1971		
Long March 1D	CHN	CALT	740	--	--	--	0				Retired	1995	2002	3 suborbital launches only (2 successful.)	
Mu 1-3-4	JPN	Nissan Motor IHI	770	--	--	--	27				Retired	1966	1995	Var.: 1, 3D, 4S, 3C, 3H, 3S, 3SII	
Mu 5	JPN	Nissan Motor IHI	1,800	--	--	--	7			6	Retired	1997	2006	Var.: M-V, M-V KM	
N1	(Soviet Union) USSR	NPO Energia	90,000	--	23,500	--	4	0	0	0	Retired	1969	1972	Designed for Soviet Manned Lunar Mission	
N-I & II	JPN	Mitsubishi	2,000	730	--	--	15	15	15	14 (Note: One N-I launch partially failed due to recontact between satellite and upper stage.)	Retired	1975	1987	Derived from the American Delta rocket	
Naro	ROK	Khrunichev KARI	100	--	--	--	3	2	1	1	Retired	2009	2013	First stage uses the Russian RD-151 engine	
Safir	IRN	ISA	50	--	--	--	8 (Note: Number of Safir launches current as of 29 August 2019. Number of launches and possible outcomes are in dispute. See main page at Safir.)	5	4	4	Retired	2007	2019	Numbers given here may be in dispute	
Saturn I & IB	USA	Chrysler Douglas	18,600	--	--	19	13	13	13	13	Retired	1961	1975	Saturn 1 family also included 6 suborbital test launches	
Saturn V	USA	Boeing North American Douglas	118,000	--	47,000	185	13	13	13		Retired	1967	1973	Var.: Apollo, Skylab	
Scout	USA	US Air Force NASA	210	--	--	--	125	104			Retired	1960	1994	Var.: X1, X2, A, D, G	
Shtil'/Volna-O (R-29)	RUS	Makeyev	430	--	--	--	8 (Note: 5 of the 8 launches were suborbital (of which 2 failed); 3 of the 8 launches were intended for LEO (2 successes).)	7	2	2	Retired (as commercial launchers)	1995	2006	Var.: Volna, Shtil, 2.1, 2R, 3	
SLV	IND	ISRO	40	--	--	--	4	3	3	2	Retired	1979	1983	Launched Rohini satellite series	
STS (Space Shuttle)	USA	Alliant Martin Marietta Rockwell	24,400	3,810	--	450	135	134	134	133	Retired	1981	2011	Orbiter mass: 68585 kg.	
Terran 1	USA	Relativity Space	1,250	--	--		1	1	0	0	Retired	2023	2023	anticipates 3-D printing most rocket parts	
Thor	USA	Douglas	1,270	--	38	--	357				Retired	1957	1980	Launched Pioneer & Explorer probes	
Titan II-(II GLV)-III-IV (LGM-25C)	USA	Martin Marietta	21,900	5,773	8,600	350	369				Retired	1959	2005	Var.: I, II, IIIA, IIIB, IIIC, IIID, IIIE, 34D, IVA, IVB; Gemini launcher	
Tsyklon (R-36)	(Soviet Union) USSR; UKR	Yuzhmash	4,100	--	--	--	259				Retired	1967	2009	Var.: 1, 2, 3.	
Vanguard	USA	Martin	23	--	--	--	12		3		Retired	1957	1959		
Zhuque-1	CHN	LandSpace	300	--	--		1	1	0	0	Retired	2018	2018		

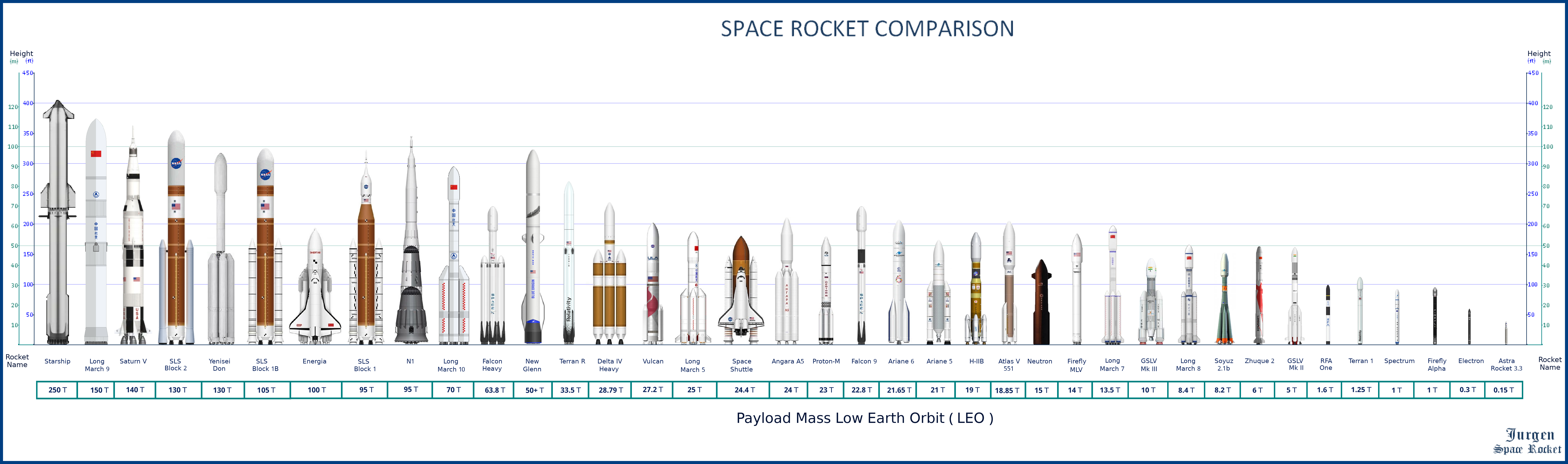
Comparison of some of the launchers listed in the following table.

== See also ==
- Comparison of orbital launch systems
- Comparison of orbital rocket engines
- Comparison of space station cargo vehicles
- List of orbital launch systems
