= List of launch service providers =

Type of company which specialises in launching spacecraft

A launch service provider or launch vehicle provider is a type of company that delivers a payload into space, including the delivery of satellites, spacecraft, cargo, astronauts, and potentially space tourists. Services provided may include furnishing launch vehicles, launch support, equipment and facilities, for the purpose of launching satellites into orbits or deep space. These companies and their launch vehicles are in various stages of development, with some (such as SpaceX, Rocket Lab, and United Launch Alliance) already in regular operation, while others are not.

In 2018, the launch services sector accounted for $5.5 billion out of a total $344.5 billion "global space economy". It is responsible for the ordering, conversion or construction of the carrier rocket, assembly and stacking, payload integration, and ultimately conducting the launch itself. Some of these tasks may be delegated or sub-contracted to other companies. For example, United Launch Alliance formally subcontracted the production of GEM solid rocket motors for their Delta II and Delta IV (medium version) rockets to Alliant Techsystems (both vehicles are now retired). An LSP does not necessarily build all the rockets it launches.

A document central to successful launch service provision is the Interface Control Document (ICD), a contract that specifies the integration and mission requirements responsibilities across the service provider and the service solicitor.

In some cases, an LSP is not required to launch a rocket. Government organizations such as the military and defense forces may conduct the launch themselves.

== Current launch service providers ==
=== Corporate ===
- AgniKul Cosmos (India)
- Arianespace (France)
- Astra (United States)
- Avio (Italy)
- Blue Origin (United States)
- CAS Space (China)
- Deep Blue Aerospace (China)
- Evolution Space (United States)
- Firefly Aerospace (United States)
- Galactic Energy (China)
- GK Launch Services (Russia, Kazakhstan)
- Innospace (South Korea)
- Interstellar Technologies (Japan)
- Isar Aerospace (Germany)
- i-Space (China)
- LandSpace (China)
- LinkSpace (China)
- MaiaSpace (France)
- Mitsubishi Heavy Industries (Japan)
- Northrop Grumman (United States)
- HyImpulse (Germany)
- OneSpace (China)
- Orienspace (China)
- PLD Space (Spain)
- Relativity Space (United States)
- Rocket Factory Augsburg (Germany)
- Rocket Lab (United States/New Zealand)
- Sea Launch (Switzerland)
- Skyroot Aerospace (India)
- Skyrora (United Kingdom)
- Space One (Japan)
- Space Pioneer (China)
- SpaceX (United States)
- Stoke Space (United States)
- United Launch Alliance (United States)
- Up Aerospace (United States)
- Vector Launch (United States)
- Virgin Galactic (United States)
- Zero 2 Infinity (Spain)

=== Former corporate ===
- Eurockot Launch Services (Germany/Russia)
- International Launch Services (United States/Russia)
- ISC Kosmotras (Russia/Ukraine/Kazakhstan)
- Starsem (France/Russia)
- Stratolaunch Systems (United States)
- Virgin Orbit (United States)

=== Governmental and state-owned ===
- Antrix Corporation (India)
- CALT (China)
- DARPA (United States)
- ExPace (China)
- Glavkosmos (Russia)
- ISA (Iran)
- JAXA (Japan)
- NATA (North Korea)
- NASA (United States)
- NSIL (India)
