= VTVL =

Method of takeoff and landing used by rockets; vertical takeoff, vertical landing

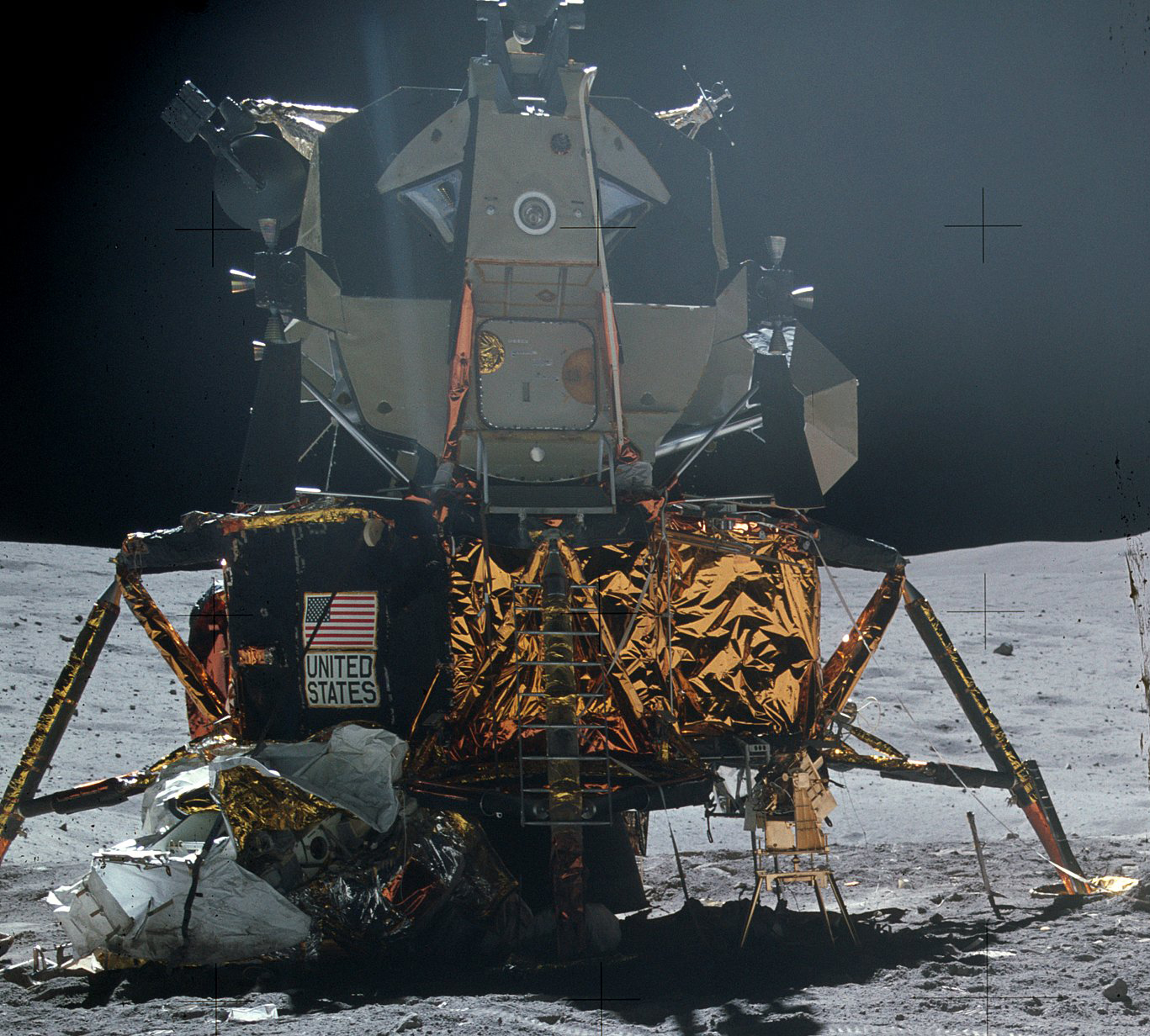
Apollo 16 LM Orion on the lunar surface, 1972

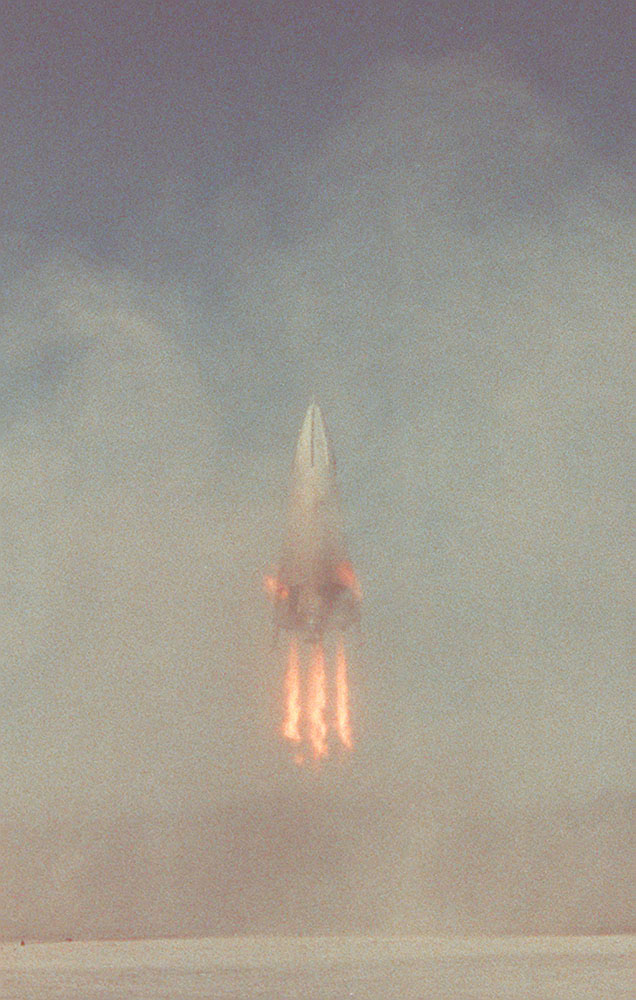
DC-XA landing in 1996

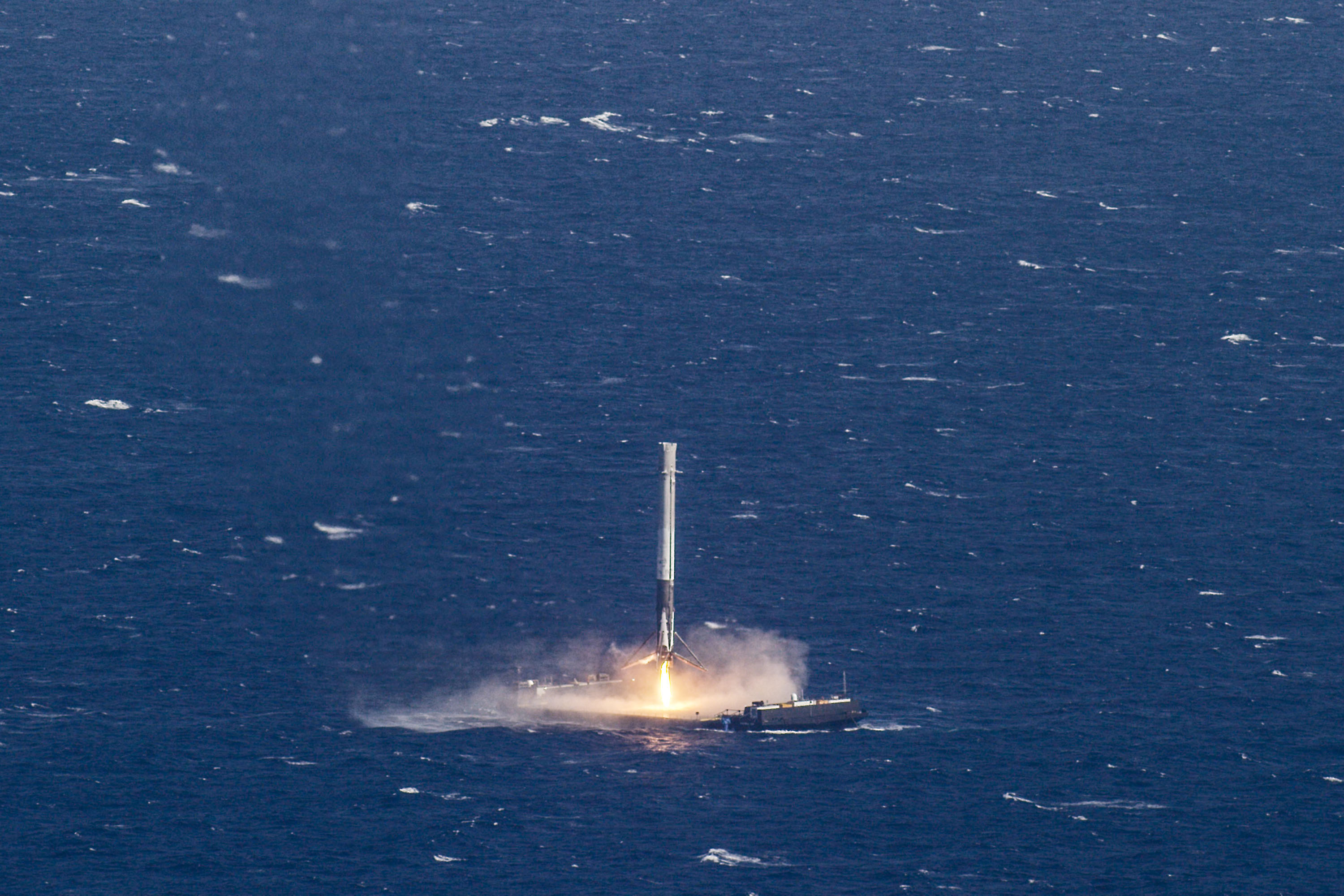
A Falcon 9 first stage performing a vertical landing, 2016

Vertical takeoff, vertical landing (VTVL) is a form of takeoff and landing for rockets. Multiple VTVL craft have flown. A notable VTVL vehicle was the Apollo Lunar Module which delivered the first humans to the Moon. Building on the decades of development, SpaceX utilised the VTVL concept for its flagship Falcon 9 first stage, which has delivered over five hundred successful powered landings so far.

VTVL technologies were first seriously developed for the Apollo program. By the '90s, development on large reliable restartable rocket engines made it possible to use the already matured technology for rocket stages. The first pioneer was the McDonnell Douglas DC-X demonstrator. After the success of the DC-X prototype, the concept was developed substantially with small rockets after 2000, in part due to incentive prize competitions like the Lunar Lander Challenge.

Starting in the mid-2000s, VTVL was under intense development as a technology for reusable rockets large enough to transport people. From 2005 to 2007 Blue Origin did a series of successful tests, first with the jet powered Charon demonstrator, later using the Goddard demonstrator. Small VTVL rockets were also developed by Masten Space Systems, Armadillo Aerospace, and others. In 2013, after the failure of stage recovery with parachutes, SpaceX demonstrated vertical landing on a Falcon 9 prototype after climbing 744 meters in the air. Later, Blue Origin (New Shepard) and SpaceX (Falcon 9), both demonstrated recovery of launch vehicles after return to the launch site (RTLS) operations, with Blue Origin's New Shepard booster rocket making the first successful vertical landing on November 23, 2015, following a flight that reached outer space, and SpaceX's Falcon 9 flight 20 marking the first landing of a commercial orbital booster roughly a month later, on December 22, 2015. Many launches of the SpaceX Falcon Heavy have included successful VTVL operations of the two side boosters on each rocket. SpaceX is also developing a fully reusable rocket named Starship. Starship became the first launch vehicle to demonstrate the technology with both of its stages on its fourth test flight.

VTVL rockets are not to be confused with aircraft that take off and land vertically and use air for support and propulsion, such as helicopters and jump jets which are VTOL aircraft.

== History ==
- 1961 Bell Rocket Belt, personal VTVL rocket belt demonstrated.
- VTVL rocket concepts were studied by Philip Bono of Douglas Aircraft Co. in the 1960s.
- Apollo Lunar Module was a 1960s two-stage VTVL vehicle for landing and taking off from the Moon.
- Australia's Defence Science and Technology Group successfully launched the Hoveroc rocket on 2 May 1981 in a test at Port Wakefield, South Australia. It was capable of "a controlled flight path within a horizontal plane and terminating, if needed, in a controlled descent."
- The Soviet Union did some development work on a vertically landing crewed capsule called Zarya in the late 1980s.
- The McDonnell Douglas DC-X was a 1/3 scale uncrewed prototype SSTO VTVL launch vehicle that flew several test flights in the 1990s. Its first successful flight was in 1993. In June 1996, the vehicle set an altitude record of 3,140 metres (10,300 ft), before making a vertical landing.
- Rotary Rocket successfully tested a vertical landing system for their Roton design, based on a rocket tipped helicopter system in 1999, but were unable to raise funds to build a full vehicle.
- On June 13, 2005, Blue Origin VTVL Suborbital Reusable Launch Vehicle was announced.
- 2005: Blue Origin Charon, a jet engine propelled test vehicle, verified the autonomous guidance and control technologies later used in Blue Origins VTVL rockets.
- 2006, 2007: Blue Origin Goddard, a subscale demonstrator for the later New Shephard suborbital vehicle, made 3 successful flights before retirement.
- During 2006–2009, Armadillo Aerospace's Scorpius / Super Mod, Masten Space Systems' Xombie and Unreasonable Rocket's Blue Ball flying VTVL rockets competed in the Northrop Grumman / NASA Lunar Lander Challenge. Follow-on VTVL designs including Masten's Xaero and Armadillo's Stig were aimed at higher-speed flight to higher suborbital altitudes.
- SpaceX announced plans in 2010 to install deployable landing gear on the Dragon spacecraft and use the vehicle's thrusters to perform a land-based landing. It was cancelled in 2017.
- In 2010, three VTVL craft were proffered to NASA in response to NASA's suborbital reusable launch vehicle (sRLV) solicitation under NASA's Flight Operations Program: the Blue Origin New Shepard, the Masten Xaero, and the Armadillo Super Mod.
- Morpheus is a 2010s NASA project developing a vertical test bed that demonstrates new green propellant propulsion systems and autonomous landing and hazard detection technology.
- Mighty Eagle was an early 2010s Robotic Prototype Lander that was being developed by NASA as of August 2012.

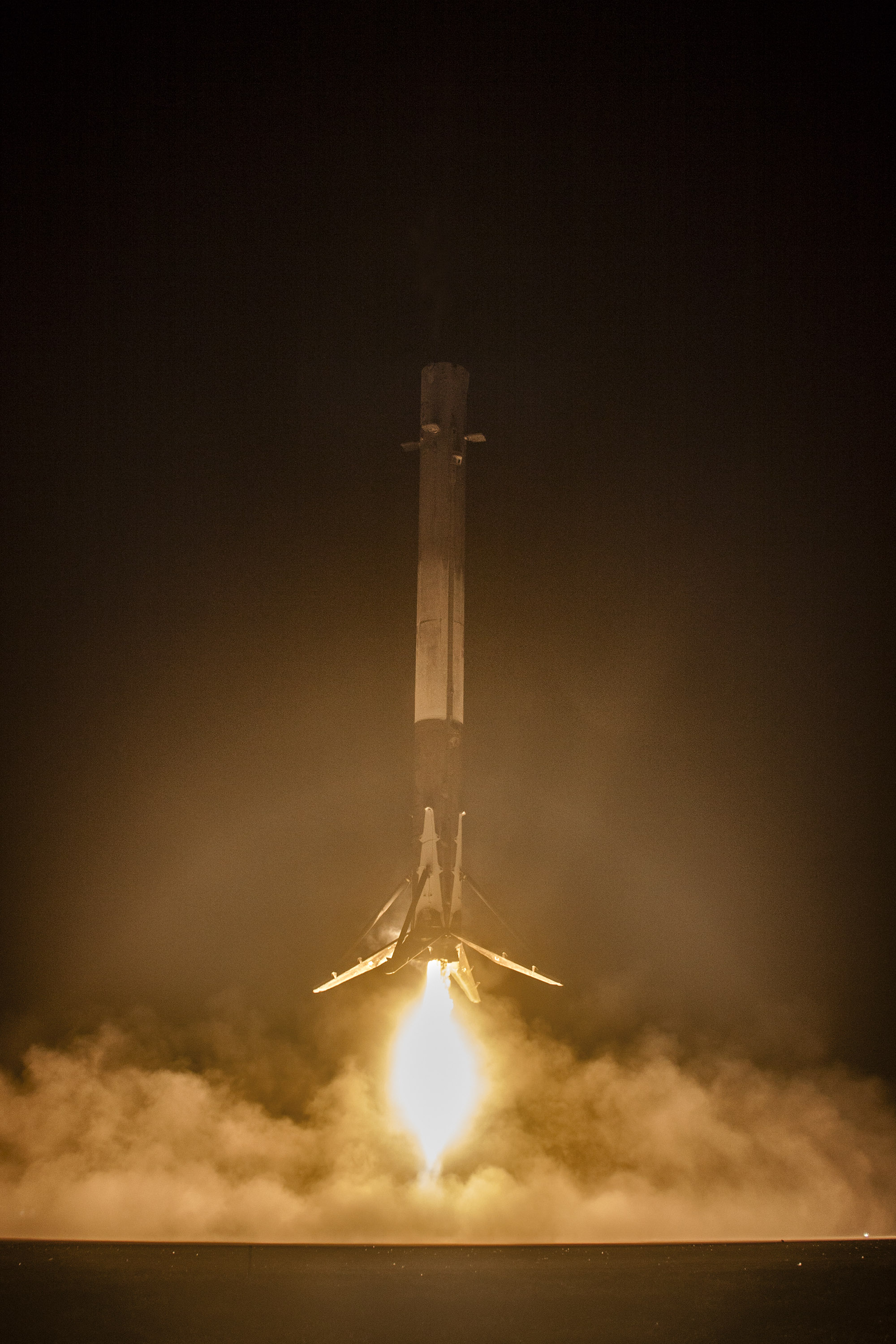
A Falcon 9 first stage landing on 21 December 2015 after boosting commercial satellites to low Earth orbit

- SpaceX announced in September 2011 that they would attempt to develop powered descent and recovery of both Falcon 9 stages, with a VTVL Dragon capsule as well.
- 2012: SpaceX's Grasshopper rocket was a VTVL first-stage booster test vehicle developed to validate low-altitude, low-velocity engineering aspects of its large-vehicle reusable rocket technology. The test vehicle made eight successful test flights in 2012–2013. Grasshopper v1.0 made its eighth, and final, test flight on October 7, 2013, flying to an altitude of 744 metres (2,441 ft) (0.46 miles) before making its eighth successful VTVL landing.
- 2013–2017: DragonFly was a prototype low-altitude rocket-powered test article for a propulsively-landed version of the SpaceX Dragon space capsule. It was intended to use the technology on Dragon 2, their second generation crew-carrying reusable space capsule, for landing after returning from space, as well as a launch abort system. The DragonFly prototype was used for low-altitude propulsive flight testing in 2014 and 2015. Development was abandoned by mid-2017.
- 2014: SpaceX's Falcon 9 Reusable Development Vehicle was approximately 50 feet longer than Grasshopper, and was built on their full-size Falcon 9 v1.1 booster tank, with flight-design landing legs and gaseous nitrogen thrusters to control the booster attitude. F9R Dev1 made its first test flight in April 2014, to an altitude of 250 meters (820 ft) before making a nominal vertical landing.
- On November 23, 2015, Blue Origin's New Shepard booster rocket made the first successful vertical landing following an uncrewed suborbital test flight that reached space.
- On December 21, 2015, SpaceX's 20th Falcon 9 first stage made the first successful vertical landing of an orbital-class booster after boosting 11 commercial satellites to low Earth orbit on Falcon 9 Flight 20.
- On April 8, 2016, SpaceX's Falcon 9 made the first successful landing on their Autonomous spaceport drone ship as part of the SpaceX CRS-8 cargo resupply mission to the International Space Station.
- Since 2017, DLR, CNES and JAXA are developing a reusable VTVL rocket demonstrator called CALLISTO (Cooperative Action Leading to Launcher Innovation in Stage Toss-back Operations).
- January 2018: Chinese private space company LinkSpace successfully tested its reusable experimental orbital rocket with a vertical takeoff and vertical landing (VTVL)
- On February 6, 2018, SpaceX successfully landed two of their first stage boosters during their demonstration flight of the Falcon Heavy.
- 2018: ISRO revealed details about the ADMIRE test vehicle for which a test and landing site was being developed. The vehicle will have supersonic retro propulsion, special retractable landing legs which will act as steerable grid fins & will be guided by integrated navigation system that will have a laser altimeter and a NavIC receiver.
- Low-altitude VTVL testing of the large 9-meter (30 ft)-diameter Starhopper, an early test article for the SpaceX Starship, occurred at the SpaceX South Texas Launch Site near Brownsville, Texas in July and August 2019 with flights up to ~150 m (490 ft) were made.
- In August 2020, SpaceX began testing its Starship prototypes. SN5, SN6, and SN15 made successful VTVL launch and landings while SN8, SN9, SN10, and SN11 were destroyed due to landing failure.
- On July 20, 2021, Blue Origin's New Shepard rocket made its first successful vertical landing following a crewed suborbital flight. Four passengers were on board the NS-16, including Jeff Bezos.
- In July 2021, October 2021, and May 2022, Deep Blue Aerospace's Nebula M1, equipped with the Leiting-20 kerolox engine, successfully conducted VTVL flight tests at ten-meter, hundred-meter, and one-kilometer altitudes respectively.
- On November 2, 2023 and December 10, 2023, i-Space’s Hyperbola-2Y, powered by a restartable methalox engine, completed vertical launch and recovery twice, with flight heights of 178 meters and 343 meters respectively.
- On January 19, 2024, LandSpace’s Zhuque-3 VTVL-1 test made its first successful vertical landing following a suborbital hop test powered by a methalox engine.
- On January 26, 2024, ExPace's Kuaizhou reusable technology test rocket completed its inaugural vertical takeoff and landing (VTVL) test, hovering for nine seconds before touching down at the launch pad. The entire flight lasted 22 seconds.
- On October 7, 2024, ISRO revealed plans to test VTVL technology on a small-scale vehicle (possibly ADMIRE test vehicle) before integrating it into the NGLV first stage and booster stage. Vikram Sarabhai Space Centre is developing advanced navigation system, as well as steerable grid fins, deployable landing legs, and advanced avionics.
- On October 13, 2024, SpaceX landed Super Heavy Booster 12 at the launch site. Unlike Falcon 9, Super Heavy lacks landing legs, and is instead caught by the launch tower. Its upper stage, Ship 30, landed softly in the Indian Ocean before detonating.
- On November 13, 2025, Blue Origin landed the first stage of New Glenn 7×2 on a ship, Jacklyn. The stage uses seven BE-4 methalox engines.
- On July 10, 2026, China's Long March 10B made its maiden liftoff. The first stage returned vertically and was caught at sea by a ship-mounted net-like recovery structure. This was the first time China successfully recovered a booster during an orbital launch.

== Vertical landing technology ==
The technology required to successfully achieve retropropulsive landings—the vertical landing, or "VL," addition to the standard vertical takeoff (VT) technology of the early decades of human spaceflight—has several parts. First, the thrust is normally required to be vectored and requires some degree of throttling. However, a thrust-to-weight ratio of more than 1 is not strictly necessary.

The vehicle must be capable of calculating its position and altitude; small deviations from the vertical can cause large deviations in the vehicle’s horizontal position. RCS systems are usually required to keep the vehicle at the correct angle. SpaceX also uses grid fins for attitude control during the landing of their Falcon 9 boosters.

It can also be necessary to be able to ignite engines in a variety of conditions potentially including vacuum, hypersonic, supersonic, transonic, and subsonic.

The additional weight of fuel, larger tank, landing legs and their deployment mechanisms will usually reduce the performance of a soft landing system compared to expendable vehicles, all other things being equal. The main benefit of the technology is seen in the potential for substantial reductions in space flight costs as a result of being able to reuse rockets after successful VTVL landings.

== Popular culture ==
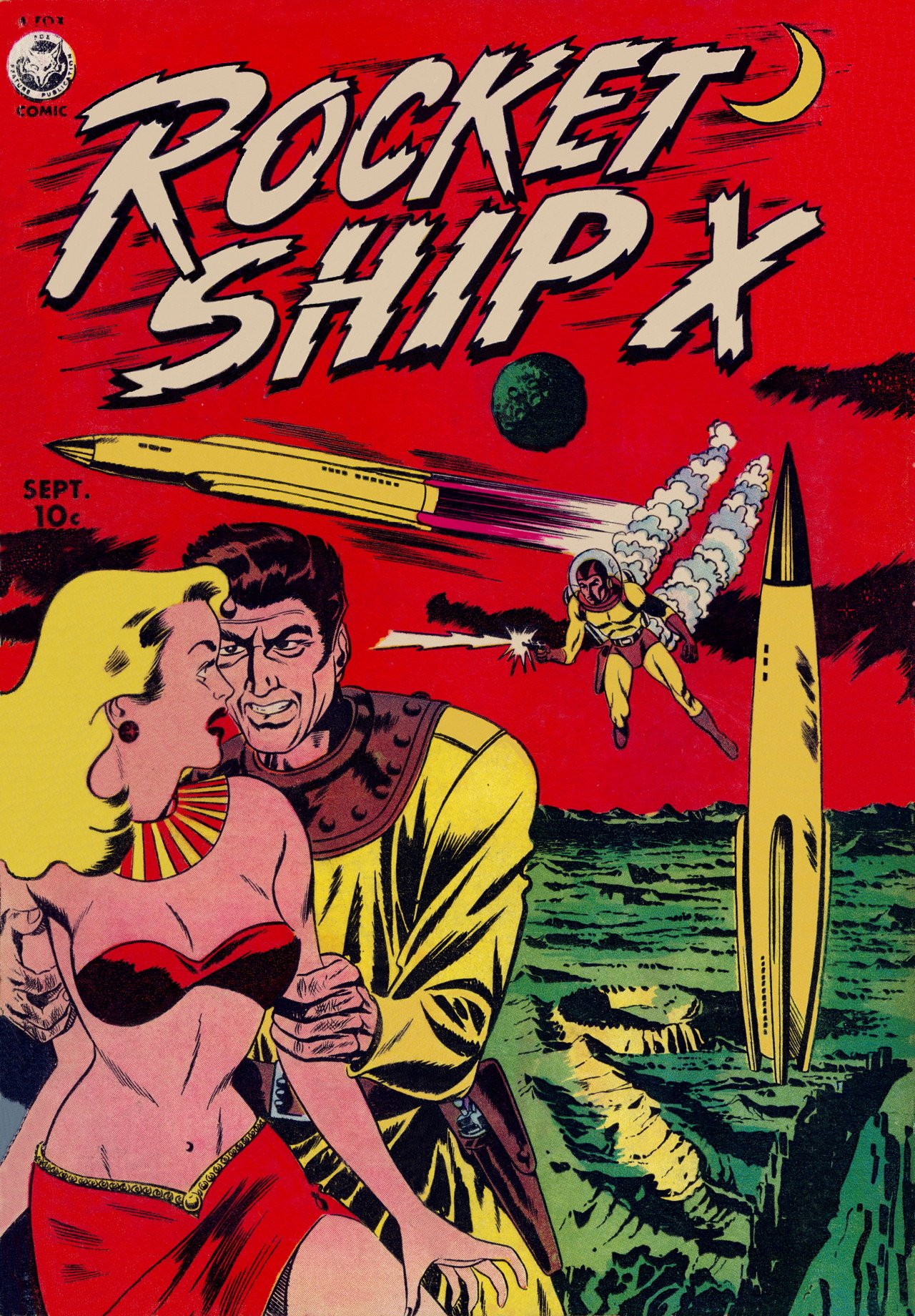
Vertical landing rocket depicted in 1951 comic Rocket Ship X

Vertical landing of spaceships was the predominant mode of rocket landing envisioned in the pre-spaceflight era. Many science fiction authors as well as depictions in popular culture showed rockets landing vertically, typically resting after landing on the space vehicle's fins. This view was sufficiently ingrained in popular culture that in 1993, following a successful low-altitude test flight of a prototype rocket, a writer opined: "The DC-X launched vertically, hovered in mid-air ... The spacecraft stopped mid-air again and, as the engines throttled back, began its successful vertical landing. Just like Buck Rogers." In the 2010s, SpaceX rockets have likewise seen the appellation to this popular culture notion of Buck Rogers in a "Quest to Create a 'Buck Rogers' Reusable Rocket."

The Young Sheldon episode, "A Patch, a Modem, and a Zantac®" features Sheldon Cooper developing the equations for VTVL in the 1980s, only to have them rejected by NASA for lack of the technical capability to implement it at that time. Sheldon concludes that he is ahead of his time. A flashforward to 2016 shows the successful SpaceX CRS-8 mission, followed by SpaceX founder Elon Musk looking over Sheldon's old notebook then hiding it in a desk drawer.

== See also ==
- Chrysler SERV
- CORONA
- Falcon 9 flight 20
- Kankoh-maru – VTVL
- Sea Launch
