= Nebula-1 =

Partly reusable Orbital launch vehicle by Deep Blue Aerospace of China

- Function: Orbital launch vehicle
- Manufacturer: Deep Blue Aerospace
- Country of origin: China

Size
- Height: 30.2 m (99 ft)
- Diameter: 3.35 m (11.0 ft) (1st stage); 2.25 m (7 ft 5 in) (2nd stage)
- Mass: ~150,000 kg (330,000 lb)
- Stages: 2

Capacity

Payload to low Earth orbit (LEO)
- Mass: 2,800 kg (6,200 lb)

Launch history
- Status: Under development
- Launch sites: "Oriental Aerospace Port" (Dong Fang Hang Tian Gang); Haiyang, Yantai, Shandong Province
- Total launches: 0

First stage
- Powered by: 9 × Thunder-R
- Maximum thrust: ~ 1,800 kN (180 t_{f}; 400,000 lbf) Sea-Level
- Propellant: LOX / RP-1

Second stage
- Powered by: 1 × Thunder-RV
- Maximum thrust: 207 kN (21.1 t_{f}; 47,000 lbf) Vacuum
- Propellant: LOX / RP-1

Nebula-1 (Xingyun-1 or XY-1, Chinese: 星云一号) is an under-development, two-stage, small-lift partially recoverable launch vehicle with the capacity to lift up to two tonnes into Low Earth orbit. It is the first orbital launch vehicle by Chinese commercial firm Deep Blue Aerospace (Deep Blue) and it employs kerosene and liquid oxygen for propulsion. The first flight of the rocket is anticipated to occur in 2026.

== History ==
As part of the development process for the partially reusable Nebula-1 launch vehicle, Deep Blue has carried out a series of vertical-takeoff-vertical-landing (VTVL) tests.

On October 13, 2021, Deep Blue completed a 100-meter level launch and landing test with its Nebula M1 VTVL test stage.

On May 6, 2022, the Nebula M1 completed a one kilometer test, which included a vertical takeoff and vertical landing (VTVL), above Tongchuan, Shaanxi Province.

On September 22, 2024, Deep Blue conducted a 10 km VTVL hop test, which featured the first flight of the Thunder-R kerosene-liquid oxygen engines (three of which were used on this flight). The test ended with a hard landing; nevertheless, the company completed 10 of its 11 objectives during the test flight.

Sometime between July 28 and August 2, 2025, Deep Blue likely conducted a fourth VTVL test with a Nebula 1 test-stage. Satellite imagery of Deep Blue's launch site at Jiuquan Satellite Launch Center, when compared to satellite imagery taken on July 28, suggests that the test-stage may have crashed.

On 30 September 2025, Deep Blue announced that it had successfully completed a static-fire test of Nebula-1's second-stage engine. The second-stage engine and its power system functioned stably and continuously for 308 seconds.

On 1 November 2025, Deep Blue successfully carried out a nine-engine full-system static-fire test of Nebula-1's first stage propulsion system under simulated flight conditions, including "...pre-launch preparation, kerosene loading, liquid oxygen loading, engine pre-cooling, pre-launch pressurization, engine ignition, and shutdown processes. It was a comprehensive verification of the entire chain of systems, including rocket structure, ground launch support, propulsion, control, and safety control."

== Launches ==
First flight of the Nebula-1 is anticipated to occur in 2026.

Flight No.	Rocket	Serial No.	Date/Time (UTC)	Launch site	Payload	Orbit	Outcome	Booster Recovery
1	XY-1	Y1	NET Q2 2026	Dong Fang Hang Tian Gang, Shandong	TBD	LEO	Planned	Planned
1	First flight of Nebula-1.							

== See also ==
- Deep Blue Aerospace
- Comparison of orbital launcher families
- Comparison of orbital launch systems
- Reusable launch vehicle
- Expendable launch system
- Lists of rockets

=== Launch systems of comparable class and technology ===
- Long March 6
- Long March 12A
- Jielong 3
- Lijian-1
