= I-Space (Chinese company) =

Chinese space launch company

i-Space
- Type: Private
- Industry: aerospace
- Founded: 2016; 10 years ago
- Headquarters: Beijing, China
- Products: Launch service provider
- Website: www.i-space.com.cn

i-Space (Chinese: 星际荣耀; pinyin: xīngjì róngyào; lit. 'Interstellar Glory'; also known as Space Honor, Beijing Interstellar Glory Space Technology Ltd., Interstellar Glory or StarCraft Glory) is a Chinese private space technology development and space launch company based in Beijing, founded in October 2016.

The company is developing two-stage small satellite orbital launchers based on solid propellant rocket engines procured from major Chinese government supplier China Aerospace Science and Technology Corporation (CAST).

In July 2019, i-Space successfully launched the Hyperbola-1 and reached low Earth orbit on its maiden flight, becoming the first private company from China to achieve orbit. The company's next three orbital launch attempts (two in 2021 and one in 2022) using the same launch vehicle all ended in failure. But a return to success in orbital launches with the Hyperbola-1 followed in 2023 when the company conducted a successful test launch with no payload in April of that year and continued with a December 2023 launch that placed the DEAR-1 satellite in an SSO orbit.

== History ==
The company was founded in 2016.

By 2019, i-Space had successfully launched the Hyperbola-1S and Hyperbola-1Z single-stage solid-propellant test rockets into space on suborbital test flights, and then reached low Earth orbit with Hyperbola-1 on its maiden flight on 25 July 2019, becoming the first private company from China to have achieved orbit.

The company raised US$173 million in private capital in a series B round during 2020.

== Rockets ==
=== Suborbital rockets: Hyperbola-1S and Hyperbola-1Z ===
The Hyperbola-1S (also called SQX-1S), and the Hyperbola-1Z (also called SQX-1Z), are single stage, solid-propellant suborbital test rockets. The Hyperbola-1S rocket was 8.4 m (28 ft) long, with a diameter of 1 m (3 ft 3 in) and weighed 4.6 t (5.1 tons). The Hyperbola-1Z rocket has a diameter of about 1.4 m (4 ft 7 in), maximum design speed of 1.6 km/s (0.99 mi/s) and can reach altitude of 175 km (109 mi) on a suborbital trajectory.

The first sub-orbital test flight of Hyperbola-1S took place from Hainan island on 5 April 2018 to an altitude of 108 km (67 mi).

The second flight of i-Space was a commercial sub-orbital flight launched on 5 September 2018 from the Jiuquan Satellite Launch Center in the Gobi Desert, using the Hyperbola-1Z rocket. The sub-orbital flight reached an altitude of 108 km (67 mi) and a peak velocity of over 1,200 m/s (3,900 ft/s). It carried payloads from private Chinese satellite companies ZeroG Labs and ADA-space. The rocket delivered three CubeSat satellites one of which subsequently parachuted back to Earth.

=== Hyperbola-1 ===
The Hyperbola-1 (aka Shuangquxian-1, SQX-1) (Chinese: 双曲线一号) rocket is 20.8 m (68 ft) tall, 1.4 m (4 ft 7 in) in diameter and weighs 31 t (34 tons). It consists of four all solid fuel stages, guided by liquid fuel attitude control engines. It can launch 300 kg (660 lb) into low Earth orbit (LEO). The rocket might be based on Chinese military missiles (perhaps DF-11 or DF-15). The first stage of the rocket is equipped with four grid fins. The launch price is reported around US$5 million.

Its successful maiden flight was on 25 July 2019, at 05:00 UTC from Jiuquan Satellite Launch Center. It launched from a movable supporting platform. It placed numerous payloads, among them the CAS-7B amateur radio satellite, into orbit 300 km (190 mi) above Earth. CAS-7B decayed from orbit 6 August 2019. It was the first Chinese private company to achieve orbit (orbital launches of other private companies before had failed).

A second launch occurred on 1 February 2021, at 08:15 UTC (16:15 Beijing Time) from Jiuquan Satellite Launch Center with 6 unidentified satellites but failed to reach orbit. A subsequent investigation revealed that a piece of insulation had broken off and got stuck in the turning mechanism of grid fin Number IV. When the piece was blown away, the control system then suddenly overcompensated, resulting in the rocket being ripped apart by excessive aerodynamic forces. The rocket was named "Tianshu" because its outer fuselage was covered with the artistic creations (images of compound made-up Chinese characters) of the contemporary artist Xu Bing.

iSpace launched a third Hyperbola-1 solid-rocket vehicle on 3 August 2021. SpaceNews was reporting the same day that the outcome of the launch was unknown, but that amateur video of the launch had been posted, but then deleted from Chinese social media. After most of the day had passed, the Chinese official media Xinhua reported that the launch was unsuccessful due to off-nominal performance of the rocket which resulted in a failure to achieve orbit. An official statement released by the company itself the following day clarified that the failure was caused by a malfunctioning in the fairing separation process, that precluded the payload from reaching the target orbit. A fourth launch attempt on 13 May 2022, was unsuccessful as well.

In April 2023, i-Space performed a fifth launch of the Hyperbola-1 which successfully reached orbit without a payload (or possibly a dummy payload), and then followed with another launch on 17 December 2023 that placed the DEAR-1 satellite from Chinese company Azspace into a 500 kilometre SSO orbit.

=== Hyperbola-2 ===
The Hyperbola-2 (Chinese: 双曲线二号) is a two-stage, liquid-fueled, reusable rocket designed to lift 1.9 tons into LEO. It features the JD-1 engine which employs methane as fuel and liquid oxygen as the oxidizer. The first stage is expected to land propulsively in order to be reused. The rocket's JD-1 engine had its first hot fire test in May 2020. As of July 2022, the first launch was expected to occur in 2023 following a series of first stage hop tests. In July 2023 i-Space announced that it has decided to suspend further development of the Hyperbola-2 launcher and instead directly proceed with the development of the reusable medium-lift Hyperbola-3 rocket.

=== Hyperbola-3 ===
The Hyperbola-3 is a 69-metre tall, two-stage, liquid-fueled, partially reusable rocket; it is designed to lift at least 8.5 tons into LEO in reusable mode and 13.4 tons in expendable mode. The rocket uses nine Focus-2 (JD-2) engines, which use methane as fuel and liquid oxygen as the oxidizer. i-Space is targeting a first flight of the expendable Hyperbola-3 for 2025, while an attempt at first-stage vertical landing and recovery is slated for 2026; a heavy-lift 3-core variant named the Hyperbola-3B is also planned by the company.

On 2 November 2023, i Space performed a VTVL test of Hyperbola 3 and its JD 2 engine. The test article reached a maximum height of 178.42 m during the 51 second long flight.

A second successful test of the Hyperbola-2Y test vehicle took place on 10 December 2023 with the stage reaching a height of about 343 metres and translating a horizontal distance of about 50 metres after its 63 second flight.

On 5 August 2025, I-Space revealed the completed drone-ship for Hyperbola 3. Similar to SpaceX's drone-ships, this autonomous ship will be the landing barge for I-Space's reusable Hyperbola 3 rocket. The ship launched from Yangzhou (扬州市) from where it was built and will eventually be serviced off the shore of Wenchang Commercial Space Launch Site. The name of the ship is Qinglan (清澜), or calm waves.

On 29 December 2025, I-Space released footage documenting preparations for a sea-based VTVL first-stage recovery of Hyperbola-3 ahead of its first orbital flight planned for 2026. The footage and accompanying description showed ground testing of a full-scale landing leg, conducted at the company's Wencheng facility and subjected to structural load testing intended to simulate landing conditions.

=== List of launches ===
Flight number	Launch vehicle	Serial number	Date (UTC)	Launch site	Payload	Orbit	Result
1	Hyperbola-1	Y1	25 July 2019; 05:00	LS-95A, JSLC	CAS-7B undisclosed payloads	LEO	Success
2	Hyperbola-1	Y2	1 February 2021; 08:15	LS-95A, JSLC	undisclosed payloads	SSO	Failure
3	Hyperbola-1	Y5	3 August 2021; 07:39	LS-95B, JSLC	Jilin-1 Mofang-01A	SSO	Failure
4	Hyperbola-1	Y4	13 May 2022; 07:09	LS-95B, JSLC	Jilin-1 Mofang-01A (R)	SSO	Failure
5	Hyperbola-1	Y6	7 April 2023; 04:00	LS-95A, JSLC	No payload (Flight test)	SSO	Success
6	Hyperbola-1	Y7	17 December 2023; 07:00	LS-95A, JSLC	DEAR-1/Liangxi-1	SSO	Success
7	Hyperbola-1	Y8	10 July 2024; 23:40	LS-95A, JSLC	Yunyao-1 15-17	SSO	Failure
8	Hyperbola-1	Y10	29 July 2025; 04:11	LS-95A, JSLC	Kunpeng-03	SSO	Success
9	Hyperbola-1	Y?	NET December 2025; 04:00	LS-95A, JSLC	Unknown Payload	SSO	Success
10	Hyperbola-3	Y1	2027	JSLC			Planned

== Other developments ==
In May 2018, i-Space indicated they hoped to eventually develop a reusable sub-orbital spaceplane (Chinese: 亚轨道概念飞行器) for space tourism.

== Marketplace ==
i-Space is in competition with several other Chinese space rocket startups, being LandSpace, LinkSpace, Galactic Energy, Deep Blue Aerospace, Space Pioneer, ExPace, CAS Space, Space Epoch, and OneSpace.

== See also ==
=== Launch systems of comparable class and technology ===
(Reusable methane-fueled medium lift-off systems)

- LandSpace Zhuque-3
- Long March 12A
- Rocket Lab Neutron
- Soyuz-7
