= LinkSpace =

Chinese private space launch company. Developing New Line 1

Link Space Aerospace Technology Inc.
- Trade name: LinkSpace
- Type: Private
- Industry: Aerospace
- Founded: 2014
- Founder: Hu Zhenyu, Yan Chengyi, and Wu Xiaofei
- Headquarters: Beijing
- Website: linkspace.com.cn

LinkSpace (Chinese: 翎客航天; pinyin: Líng-kè Hángtiān; lit. 'LINK Aerospace') or Link Space Aerospace Technology Inc. is a Chinese private space launch company based in Beijing. It is led by CEO Hu Zhenyu, and founded as the first private rocket firm in China. The company was founded in 2014, by Hu Zhenyu, a graduate of South China University of Technology; Yan Chengyi, a graduate of Tsinghua University; and Wu Xiaofei, a manufacturing expert. The company is registered in Shenzhen.

== Rockets ==
=== Test rockets ===
In 2013, before the official registration of the company, Hu's team was testing the KC-SA-TOP suborbital rocket with 50 kg (110 lb) payloads in Horqin Left Rear Banner, Inner Mongolia Autonomous Region.

=== Reusable Rocket Landing ===
LinkSpace launched a new prototype for a reusable rocket in Eastern China. The launch took place on April 2, 2019.

=== VTVL prototypes ===
LinkSpace has built flying vertical-takeoff/vertical-landing (VTVL) prototype test rockets, to develop its reusable rocket technology. By July 2016, it achieved hover flight with a single-engine thrust-vectored rocket. By September 2017, it had built three hovering rockets, tested in Shandong Province.

On 19 April 2019, the VTVL prototype test rocket RLV-T5 flew to a height of 40 m (131 ft) and landed safely after thirty seconds of flight. RLV-T5, also known as NewLine Baby, is 8.1 m (27 ft) in length, weighs 1.5 t (1,100 lbs) and has five liquid engines.

On 10 August 2019 the company reported a test flight reaching a height of 300 meters.

On 5 May 2022, the company announced that it had conducted a static fire test of its RLV-T6 test vehicle in preparation for a 100 km (62 mi) altitude test flight in late 2022, but in September it was expected to be launched no earlier than mid-2023. The rocket will launch from Lenghu, in Qinghai Province.

=== New Line 1 ===
The New Line 1 (Xin Gan Xian 1; Chinese: 新干线一号; pinyin: xīn gàn xiàn 1) is a two-stage rocket under development to launch microsats and nanosats, with a reusable first stage. It is to be a liquid-fuelled rocket, with a diameter of 1.8 m (5.9 ft), height of 20 m (66 ft). It would have a lift-off mass of 33 t (32 long tons; 36 short tons) and take-off thrust of 400 kN (90,000 lbf), allowing a payload of 200 kg (440 lb) to be lifted into a Sun synchronous orbit (SSO) of 249–550 km (155–342 mi) high.

The first stage would have four liquid engines, fueled by kerolox (liquid oxygen and kerosene), each producing 100 kN (22,000 lbf) of thrust. It is projected to have an initial launch cost of $4.5 million, dropping to $2.25 million using a reused first stage. As of the end of 2017, the main rocket engine has been tested over 200 times, and first launch was planned for 2020.

=== Future New Line rockets ===
Future development of a reusable second stage, in addition to the reusable first stage, is anticipated for in a future vehicle, such as New Line 3.

== Services ==
LinkSpace is planning to also be a transport and rocket services company, providing rocket parts, and transportation. As part of the transportation, it will not just send payloads into orbit, or on suborbital jaunts; it also plans to send packages from one point on Earth to another point. This is similar to SpaceX's plan for suborbital rocket passenger transport anywhere around the world with Starship.

== Marketplace ==
LinkSpace is in competition with several other Chinese space rocket startups, being LandSpace, Galactic Energy, ExPace, i-Space, OneSpace and Deep Blue Aerospace. With rocket reusability and point-to-point transport, it is similar to SpaceX.

== See also ==
- ExPace – Chinese state-owned company. Launching Kuaizhou solid fuel rockets
- LandSpace – Chinese commercial space launch company
- OneSpace – Chinese rocket company. Sub orbital, and developing orbital
- Galactic Energy – Chinese aerospace company
- Deep Blue Aerospace, another Chinese company which is testing VTVL technology
