= OneSpace =

Chinese rocket company. Sub orbital, and developing orbital

- Industry: Private space launch services
- Founded: 2015 in Beijing, China
- Founder: Shu Chang.
- Headquarters: Beijing, China
- Website: www.onespacechina.com

OneSpace (Chinese: 零壹空间; pinyin: Líng Yī Kōngjiān; lit. 'Zero One Space') or One Space Technology Group (Chinese: 零壹空间科技; pinyin: Líng Yī Kōngjiān Kējì; lit. 'Zero One Space Technology') is a Chinese private space launch group based in Beijing, with subsidiaries in Chongqing, Shenzhen and Xi'an. OneSpace was founded in 2015. It is led by CEO Shu Chang, and is targeting the small launcher market for microsatellites and nanosatellites. OneSpace launched China's first private rocket in 2018.

The company unveiled its family of rockets early in 2019. At least 10 such firms have emerged since the Chinese government policy shift in late 2014 to allow private companies into the launch and small satellite sectors.

== Facilities ==
OneSpace's headquarters and R&D center are located in Beijing. Its research and development center, and manufacturing and assembly base, are located in Chongqing. Its rocket engine testing facility is located in Jiangxi Province and Shanxi Province.

== Rockets ==
=== OS-X series – suborbital ===
The OS-X series of rockets are suborbital sounding rockets, reaching high altitude or reaching space but not orbit; they are meant for research and development of their launch systems.

==== OS-X0 ====
The OS-X0 (aka "Chongqing Liangjiang Star") is a 9 m (30 ft) long suborbital high-altitude rocket. It uses solid propellant and is designed to carry payloads up to 100 km (62 mi), reaching space. Its first flight (suborbital) was on 17 May 2018, reaching an altitude of 40 km (25 mi). The rocket is built completely from homegrown Chinese technology. Its launch represents one of the first rockets (see i-Space Hyperbola-1S) designed by a private company launched in China. The development, building and launching of the rocket was achieved with budget less than $78 million. This flight was paid for by the Chinese state owned Aviation Industry Corporation of China.

==== OS-X1 ====
The OS-X1 (aka "Chongqing Liangjiang Star") is a suborbital high-altitude rocket, a sounding rocket, designed for research and testing. The solid rocket motor was successfully tested in December 2017. This 9-meter long rocket was launched at Jiuquan Satellite Launch Center on 7 September 2018 (04:10 UTC), reaching an altitude of 35 km and traveling 169 km.

==== OS-X6B ====
The OS-X6B (aka "Chongqing Liangjiang Star") is a 9.4 m (31 ft) long suborbital high-altitude rocket. It is designed to send payloads up to 300 km (190 mi) with an estimated flight time of 10 minutes. The maiden flight of this rocket took place on 5 February 2021 (09:05 UTC). The flight was successful.

=== OS-M series - orbital ===
The OS-M series of rockets are larger than the OS-X series and aim to provide low cost flights to LEO and SSO.

==== OS-M ====
The OS-M is a light-launch satellite launch vehicle rocketing payloads to low Earth orbit (LEO) and Sun synchronous orbit (SSO). It is projected to be capable of lifting 205 kg (452 lb) to 300 km (190 mi) high LEO; and 73 kg (161 lb) to 800 km (500 mi) high SSO.

As of December 2018, the tests completed for OS-M are:

- 2018/July/4: First-stage main rocket motor test.
- 2018/August/24: Three-stage solid-state propellant and the second and third stage separation system test.
- 2018/October/23: Fourth-stage engine and the third and fourth stage separation system test
- 2018/November/26 through Nov/30: Attitude control system mechanical environment test.
- 2018 December: Completed the OS-M attitude control system hot fire test.

==== OS-M1 ====
OS-M1 or just OS-M, (also known as Chongqing Liangjiang Star or Chongqing SQX or Chongqing or SQX-1Y1), is a 4-stage solid fuel orbital rocket that is 19-meters long, 1.2 meters in diameter and weighs 21-tons. It is designed to lift about 112 kilograms into a 500 km sun-synchronous orbit.

It was launched for its first orbital mission carrying the Lingque-1B technology verification satellite from Jiuquan Satellite Launch Center on 27 March 2019. Liftoff from the TLE-2 flat pad (atop a movable platform) took place at 09:39 UTC. After the first-stage separation, OS-M's attitude was unstable and the launch failed. A preliminary investigation found a malfunction of the rate gyroscope as cause. In the follow-up, OneSpace team said they will learn from the mistake and optimize the performance of the rocket.

Reportedly OS-M1 uses demilitarized solid rocket motors from retired military missiles.

==== OS-M2 ====
The OS-M2 is similar to the OS-M1, but has two boosters. Block A will be capable of lifting 390 kg (860 lb) to LEO and 204 kg (450 lb) to 800 km (500 mi) SSO, while block B will be capable of lifting 505 kg (1,113 lb) to LEO and 274 kg (604 lb) to 800 km (500 mi) SEO.

==== OS-M4 ====
The OS-M4 has four boosters. Block A will be capable of lifting 552 kg to LEO and 307 kg to 800 km SSO, while block B will be capable of lifting 748 kg to LEO and 446 kg to 800 km SEO.

==== Future OS-M rockets ====
These earlier plans, including a reusable OS-M variant and a 59-ton rocket capable of lifting 500 kg to LEO, were not realized. Following the failure of the OS-M1 orbital launch attempt in March 2019, development of the OS-M series was discontinued, and the company subsequently maintained a lower public profile.

== Launches ==
Some sub-orbital launches noted in Rockets section above.

Also one orbital attempt with OS-M1 on 27 March 2019. The attempt ended with a 2nd stage failure.

== Marketplace ==
OneSpace is in competition with several other Chinese space rocket startups, being LandSpace, LinkSpace, ExPace, i-Space, Galactic Energy, and Deep Blue Aerospace. Space Pioneer is a Chinese liquid-propellant rocket startup competing in the sector.

== Financing ==
OneSpace secured $43.6 million in series B funding in August 2018. The financing was led by CICC Jiatai Equity Fund, followed by FinTrek Capital, with China Merchants Venture Capital, Qianhai Wande Fund and Qianhai Wutong M&A Fund also increasing their investment in the company. This fourth round of financing takes the total raised since the founding of OneSpace in August 2015 to $116 million.

== See also ==
- Commercialization of space
- ExPace
- iSpace
- LandSpace
- LinkSpace
- NewSpace
- Space industry
- Space Pioneer, a competitive liquid-propellant launch vehicle provider
