= LandSpace =

Chinese commercial space launch company

LandSpace Technology Corporation
- Trade name: LandSpace
- Native name: 蓝箭航天空间科技股份有限公司
- Type: Private
- Industry: Aerospace
- Founded: June 2015; 11 years ago
- Founder: Zhang Changwu (张昌武)
- Headquarters: Beijing, China
- Website: landspace.com

LandSpace Technology Corporation
- Simplified Chinese: 蓝箭航天空间科技股份有限公司
- Traditional Chinese: 藍箭航天空間科技股份有限公司
Transcriptions
Standard Mandarin
- Hanyu Pinyin: Lánjiàn Hángtiān Kōngjiān Kējì Gǔfèn Yǒuxiàngōngsī

LandSpace
- Simplified Chinese: 蓝箭航天
- Traditional Chinese: 藍箭航天
Transcriptions
Standard Mandarin
- Hanyu Pinyin: Lánjiàn Hángtiān

LandSpace Technology Corporation (doing business as LandSpace) is a Chinese private commercial space launch provider based in Beijing. It was founded in 2015 by Zhang Changwu.

In July 2023, the company's Zhuque-2 rocket became the world's first methane-fueled launch vehicle to reach orbit after its successful second flight.

== History ==
Landspace Technology Corporation was established in 2015, after a Chinese government policy change in 2014 that allowed private capital into the space industry. Since its founding, the company has established several aerospace infrastructure sites in Zhejiang, including a $1.5 billion medium and large-scale liquid rocket assembly and test plant in Jiaxing and an intelligent manufacturing base in Huzhou.

LandSpace developed its first launch vehicle Zhuque-1, powered by solid-propellant motors. Zhuque-1 was launched on 27 October 2018, however the payload failed to reach orbit due to an issue with the third stage. The company also developed the liquid-fueled Zhuque-2, which became the first methalox rocket in the world to reach orbit after a successful second flight on 12 July 2023.

== Launch vehicles ==
=== Zhuque-1 ===
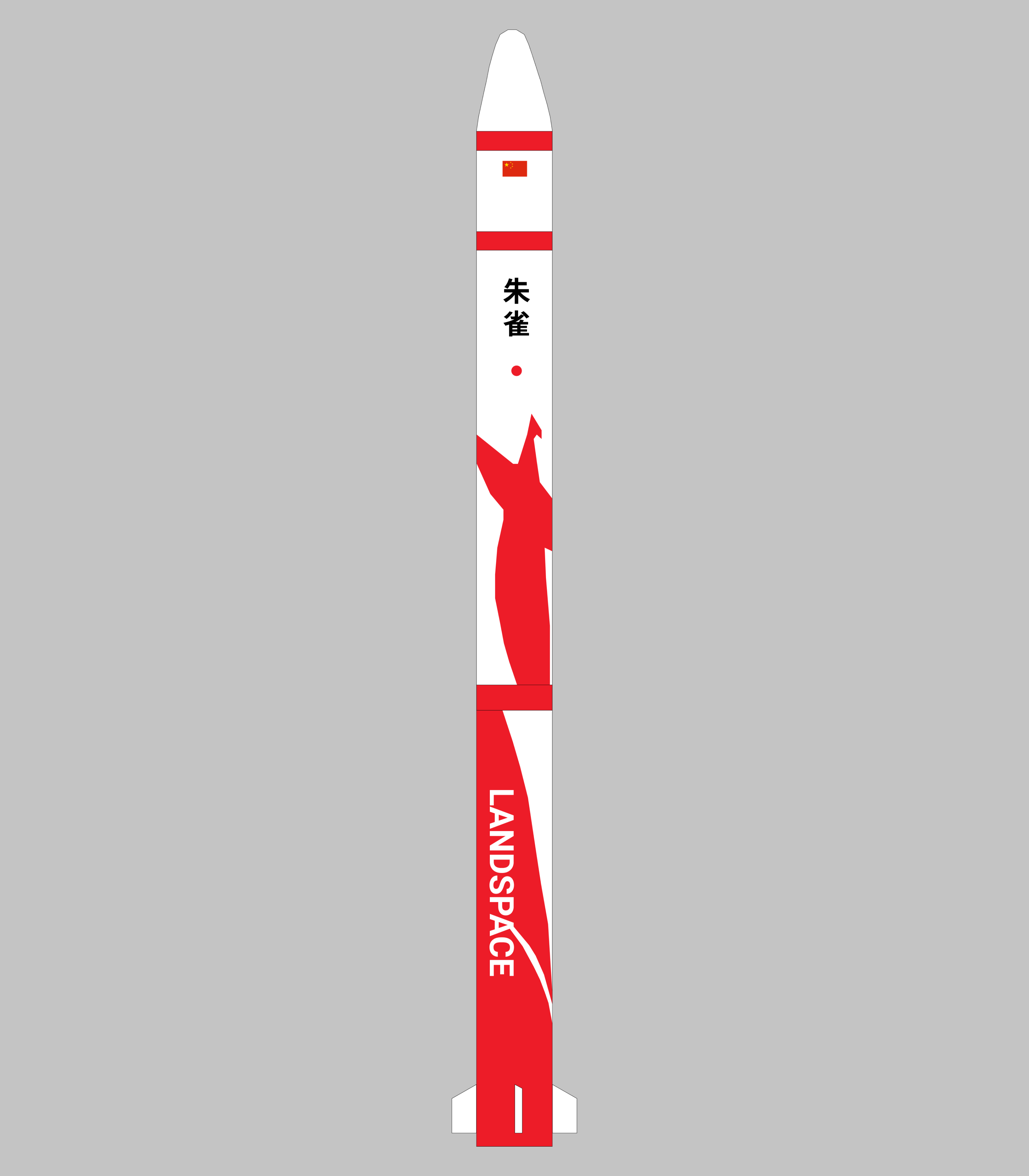
Zhuque-1

Zhuque-1 (ZQ-1, Chinese: 朱雀一号 or 朱雀·南太湖号), also known as LandSpace-1 or LS-1, is a 19-metre (62 ft) tall, three-stage solid-propellant rocket with a diameter of 1.35 m. It is likely based on the DF-26 missile's rocket motor. Zhuque-1 has a takeoff mass of 27 t (27 long tons; 30 short tons), a thrust of 45 tf (99,000 lbf), and can carry 300 kg (660 lb) of payload into a 300 km (190 mi) low Earth orbit (LEO).

The maiden flight of Zhuque-1 took place on 27 October 2018, from a mobile platform at the Jiuquan Satellite Launch Center, carrying the Weilai-1 satellite for China Central Television. Despite successful first and second stage firings and fairing separation, the payload failed to reach orbit due to a third-stage issue. Zhuque-1 was the first Chinese private orbital rocket to attempt an orbital launch.

Following the launch, reports emerged that the solid rocket motor manufacturer had ended its contract with LandSpace, casting doubt on the future of Zhuque-1. Subsequently, LandSpace announced it would shift its focus to developing the methane-fueled Zhuque-2.

=== Zhuque-2 ===
Zhuque-2 (ZQ-2) is a medium-sized liquid-fuelled rocket powered by liquid oxygen and methane capable of lifting 6,000 kg (13,000 lb) of payload into a 200 km (120 mi) LEO, or 4,000 kg (8,800 lb) of payload into a 500 km (310 mi) sun-synchronous orbit (SSO). The first flight of Zhuque-2 occurred on 14 December 2022, but the launch vehicle failed to place its payload into orbit due to the failure of its second-stage vernier engines after the second-stage main engine shutdown. Nevertheless, with this maiden launch, Zhuque-2 became the first methane-fueled rocket to reach space. On 12 July 2023, the second flight was successful, making it the first methane-fueled launch vehicle in the world to reach orbit; this flight did not carry an active payload. On 8 December 2023, the third Zhuque-2 mission successfully placed three satellites into a 433 by 461 kilometers sun-synchronous orbit.

=== Zhuque-3 ===
Zhuque-3 (ZQ-3) is a two-stage, medium-to-heavy launch vehicle made of stainless steel and powered by liquid methane fuel. Equipped with nine Tianque-12 engines (TQ-12A for the original variant, and TQ-12B for the ZQ-3E variant), five of which can gimbal and four which cannot, the first stage is designed to be recoverable and reusable for up to twenty launches. Zhuque-3 rocket is 66 meters long, 4.5 meters in diameter, and have a liftoff weight of approximately 550 tonnes. Its payload capacity to low Earth orbit is about 11.8 tonnes in expendable mode, and 8 tonnes when the first stage is recovered. Zhuque-3E (ZQ-3E) variant will be 76.6 meters long, 4.5 meters in diameter, and have a liftoff weight of approximately 660 tonnes; its planned payload capacity to low Earth orbit is about 21.3 tonnes in expendable mode, 18.3 tonnes when the first stage is recovered downrange, and 12.5 tonnes when the first stage returns to the launch site.

The maiden flight of Zhuque-3 occurred on 3 December 2025, with the rocket reaching orbit, although the attempted first stage landing failed after "an abnormal combustion" occurred during the landing burn. A number of adjustments were made to the design following this attempt, including a reduction in the number of engines used for the landing burn, additions to the autonomous safety control system, and increased thermal protection.

A second launch and recovery attempt took place on 18 August 2026, which resulted in the first-stage successfully landing 390 kilometres downrange of the launch pad after deploying the payload to orbit. The landing marked the first successful stage-recovery on land in China, and a company representative stated that they intend to refly the recovered stage within six months.

== Launches ==
=== Zhuque-1 launches ===
Rocket & serial	Flight number	Date	Payload	Orbit	Launch site	Outcome	Notes
Zhuque-1	Y1	27 October 2018, 08:00 UTC	Weilai-1 ('Future-1') satellite	LEO	Jiuquan	Failure	3 solid-fuel stages; 3rd stage anomaly.

=== Zhuque-2 launches ===
Zhuque-2 Y2 launch

Flight No.	Rocket, serial	Date and time (UTC)	Payload	Orbit	Launch site	Outcome
1	Zhuque-2 Y1	14 December 2022; 08:30	Zhixing 1B; Various	SSO	Jiuquan, Site 96	Failure
1	Maiden flight of Zhuque-2. Vernier engines failed during second-stage main-engine shutdown due to excessive forces damaging liquid-oxygen feed line. First launch vehicle using liquid methane propellant to reach space (100 km altitude).					
2	Zhuque-2 Y2	12 July 2023; 01:00	No payload (Flight test)	SSO	Jiuquan, Site 96	Success
2	First launch vehicle using liquid methane propellant to reach orbit.					
3	Zhuque-2 Y3	8 December 2023; 23:39	Honghu-1; Honghu-2; Tianyi 33	SSO	Jiuquan, Site 96	Success
3	First methane launch vehicle to launch payloads into orbit. Last launch of Zhuque-2, Future launches will happen on upgraded Zhuque-2E.					
4	Zhuque-2E Y1	27 November 2024; 02:00	Guangchuan 01; Guangchuan 02	LEO	Jiuquan, Site 96	Success
4	Maiden flight of Zhuque-2E, featuring a second stage without vernier thrusters.					
5	Zhuque-2E Y2	17 May 2025; 04:12	Tianyi-29; Tianyi-34; Tianyi-35; Tianyi-42; Tianyi-45; Tianyi-46	SSO	Jiuquan, Site 96	Success
5	Second flight of Zhuque-2E.					
6	Zhuque-2E Y3	15 August 2025; 01:17	GuangChuan × 4	SSO	Jiuquan, Site 96	Failure
6	Third flight of Zhuque-2E. According to Landspace, a voltage issue in the second stage triggered the activation of the launch vehicle's self-destruct system resulting in the loss of the vehicle and the satellites.					
7	Zhuque-2E Y5	14 May 2026; 03:00	Experimental test mass	SSO	Jiuquan, Site 96	Success
7	Return to flight mission. Fourth flight of Zhuque-2E; first flight of ZQ-2E (Block 2) with lengthened first stage and improved takeoff thrust.					
8	Zhuque-2E Y6	9 June 2026; 08:23	Qianfan DTC 01; China Mobile 02	SSO	Jiuquan, Site 96	Success
8	Second flight of ZQ-2E (Block 2). Upper stage broke apart shortly after separation.					
9	Zhuque-2E Y7	15 September 2026; 06:26	Qianfan Jigui Group 19	SSO	Jiuquan, Site 96	Success
9	10 satellites for the Thousand Sails megaconstallation.					
10	Zhuque-2E Y4	14 October 2026; 11:40	Xingshidai-39,44-50; Guangchuan-03,04	SSO	Jiuquan, Site 96	Success
10	Ten satellites launched on this flight.					

=== Zhuque-3 launches ===
Flight No.	Rocket	Serial No.	Date/Time (UTC)	Launch site	Payload	Orbit	Outcome	Booster Recovery
1	ZQ-3	Y1	3 December 2025, 04:00	Jiuquan, Site-96	Mass Simulator	LEO	Success	Failure
1	First flight of Zhuque-3. Orbital mission successful; first stage landing anomaly during final landing burn.							
2	ZQ-3	Y2	18 August 2026, 23:35	Jiuquan, Site-96	Honghu-03 (鸿鹄03星)	LEO	Success	Partial failure
2	Second successful 1st-stage recovery by a Chinese launch provider during an orbital launch attempt, first successful Chinese 1st-stage landing using landing legs. A fire broke out after landing causing one of the legs to fail and the booster tipped over.							

== Marketplace ==
LandSpace is in competition with several other Chinese space rocket startups, among them LinkSpace, Galactic Energy, ExPace, i-Space, OneSpace, Deep Blue Aerospace, Space Pioneer, CAS Space, and Space Epoch.
