= Galactic Energy =

Chinese aerospace company

Galactic Energy (Beijing) Space Technology Co., LTD.
- Trade name: Galactic Energy
- Type: Private
- Industry: Aerospace
- Founded: 6 February 2018; 8 years ago
- Founders: Liu Baiqi; Xia Dongkun
- Headquarters: Beijing, China
- Website: www.galactic-energy.cn/En

Galactic Energy
- Simplified Chinese: 星河动力
- Literal meaning: Galaxy Power
Transcriptions
Standard Mandarin
- Hanyu Pinyin: Xīnghé Dònglì

Galactic Energy (Chinese: 星河动力) is a Chinese private space launch enterprise flying the Ceres-1 and developing the Pallas-1 and Ceres-2 orbital rockets. The company's long-term objective is to mine asteroids for rare metals and minerals.

== History ==
Galactic Energy successfully conducted its first launch in November 2020 with a Ceres-1 rocket. Galactic Energy became the second private company in China to put a satellite in orbit successfully (after i-Space) and the fourth to attempt an orbital launch (after Landspace, OneSpace, and i-Space).

On 6 December 2021, Galactic Energy launched its second Ceres-1 rocket, becoming the first Chinese private firm to reach orbit twice. In January 2022, the company raised $200 million for reusable launch vehicle development.

== Launch vehicles ==
=== Ceres-1 ===
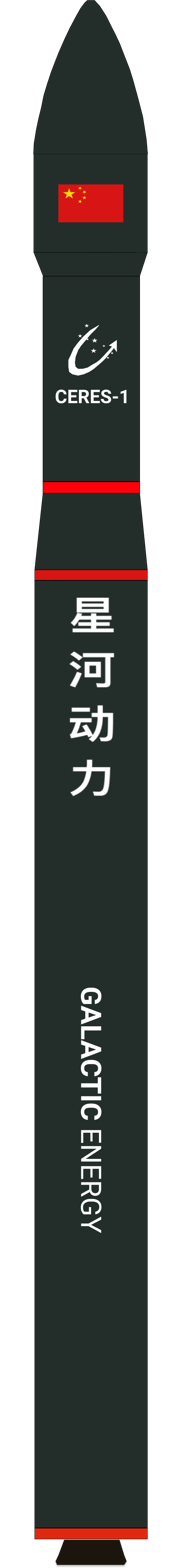
Ceres-1

Ceres-1 (Chinese: 谷神星一号) is a four-stage rocket small-lift launch vehicle, the first three stages use solid-propellant rocket motors and the final stage uses a hydrazine propulsion system. It can deliver 400 kg (880 lb) to low Earth orbit or 300 kg (660 lb) to 500 km Sun-synchronous orbit (SSO). It is about 19 m (62 ft) tall and 1.4 m (4 ft 7 in) in diameter.

The first launch of Ceres-1 took place at 7 November 2020, successfully placing the Tianqi 11 (also transcribed Tiange, also known as TQ 11, and Scorpio 1, COSPAR 2020-080A) satellite in orbit. The satellite's mass was about 50 kg (110 lb) and its purpose was to function as an experimental satellite offering Internet of things (IoT) communications.

On 5 September 2023 the sea-launched version of the launch vehicle, designated Ceres-1S, made its debut successfully sending to orbit four Tianqi satellites. The launch took place from the DeFu 15002 converted barge (previously used also for launching the Long March 11 launch vehicle) off the coast of Haiyang.

=== Ceres-2 ===
Ceres-2 (Gushenxing-2, GX-2) is an enlarged (3.35 metre diameter) and improved development of Ceres-1. It is expected to deliver up to 1600 kg to 500 km low Earth orbit and up to 1300 kg to 500 km SSO.

The debut launch of Ceres-2 on 17 January 2026 failed to reach orbit; however, Galactic Energy succeeded on the rocket's second launch attempt which occurred on 6 November 2026.

=== Pallas-1 ===
The Pallas-1 (Chinese: 智神星一号) is a partly reusable two-stage medium-lift orbital launch vehicle currently in development, with its inaugural flight anticipated in 2025. The first stage will have legs and grid fins to allow recovery by vertical landing (much like the SpaceX Falcon 9). The first stage of Pallas-1 uses seven “CQ-50” liquid oxygen/kerosene engines, with a lift-off mass of 283 tons and a maximum payload capacity to low Earth orbit (LEO) of 8 tons. Using three Pallas-1 booster cores as its first stage, the rocket will be capable of putting a 17.5-tonne payload into low Earth orbit (LEO).

=== Pallas-2 ===
The Pallas-2 is a next-generation Heavy-lift launch vehicle under development by Galactic Energy, Designed to retain features of the Pallas-1 with a significantly larger payload capacity while keeping reusable VTVL a feature. Based on the company statements Pallas-2 is projected to be more capable of placing 20 tonnes into low earth orbit. (LEO) additional configuration are in development to support larger mission profiles up to 58 tonnes on the heavy tri core variant. Galactic Energy originally presumed for first flight in 2026. Most recently 2026 is promoted as a development time period for Pallas-2. The companies main focus this year is the CQ-90 a higher thrust Kerosene/liquid-oxygen engine that plans to have a throttle range from 120 to 30 tonnes of force.

==== Development ====
The first CQ-90 engine was completed by December 2025 in preparation for testing. On 20 January 2026, the engine was installed on a test stand at Galactic Energy's facility and underwent full-system hot fire test. According to Galactic Energy the engine achieved stable operation with a reported combustion efficiency of approximately 96 percent. The engine is designed to support thrust vector control with a gimbal range of up to six degrees.

== Marketplace ==
Galactic Energy is in competition with several other Chinese space rocket startups, being LandSpace, Deep Blue Aerospace, Space Pioneer, I-Space, ExPace, LinkSpace, and OneSpace.

== Launches ==
=== Ceres-1 and 1S launches ===
| Rocket & Serial | Date | Payload | Orbit | Launch site | Outcome | Remarks |
|---|---|---|---|---|---|---|
| Ceres-1 Y1 | 7 November 2020, 07:12 | Tianqi-1 (Scorpio-1) | SSO | Jiuquan | Success | First flight of Ceres-1. |
| Ceres-1 Y2 | 7 December 2021, 04:12 | Tianjin University-1 Lize-1 Baoyun Golden Bauhinia-5 Golden Bauhinia-1 03 | SSO | Jiuquan | Success | |
| Ceres-1 Y3 | 9 August 2022, 04:11 | Taijing-1 01 Taijing-1 02 Donghai-1 | SSO | Jiuquan | Success | |
| Ceres-1 Y4 | 16 November 2022, 06:19 | Jilin-1 Gaofen-03D 08 Jilin-1 Gaofen-03D 51 Jilin-1 Gaofen-03D 52 Jilin-1 Gaofen-03D 53 Jilin-1 Gaofen-03D 54 | SSO | Jiuquan | Success | |
| Ceres-1 Y5 | 9 January 2023, 05:04 | Nantong Zhongxue Tianmu-1 01 Tianmu-1 02 Xiamen Keji-1 Tianqi-13 | SSO | Jiuquan | Success | |
| Ceres-1 Y6 | 22 July 2023, 05:07 | Qiankun-1 Xingshidai-16 (Tai'an) | SSO | Jiuquan | Success | |
| Ceres-1 Y7 | 10 August 2023, 04:03 | Diwei Zhineng Yingji-1 (Henan Ligong-1) Xi'an Hangtou × 4 Xiguang-1 01 Xingchi-1B | SSO | Jiuquan | Success | |
| Ceres-1 Y8 | 25 August 2023, 04:59 | Jilin-1 Kuanfu-02A (HKUST-Xiongbin-1) | SSO | Jiuquan | Success | |
| Ceres-1S Y1 | 5 September 2023, 09:34 | Tianqi-21 Tianqi-22 Tianqi-23 Tianqi-24 | SSO | DeFu 15002 platform, Yellow Sea | Success | First sea-launch flight. |
| Ceres-1 Y11 | 21 September 2023, 04:59 | Jilin-1 Gaofen-04B | SSO | Jiuquan | Failure | First Ceres-1 failure after 9 consecutive successful launches since 2020. |
| Ceres-1 Y9 | 5 December 2023, 23:33 | Tianyan-16; Xingchi-1A | SSO | Jiuquan | Success | |
| Ceres-1S Y2 | 29 May 2024, 08:12 | Tianqi-25; Tianqi-26; Tianqi-27; Tianqi-28 | LEO | Special converted barge (Dong Fang Hang Tian Gang); Offshore waters of Rizhao, Yellow Sea | Success | |
| Ceres-1 Y12 | 30 May 2024, 23:39 | Jiguang Xingzuo 01 & 02, Yunyao-1 14 (Hebei Linxi-1), Yunyao-1 25 (Zhangjiang Gaoke), Yunyao-1 26 (Nishuihan-2) | SSO | Jiuquan | Success | |
| Ceres-1 Y13 | 6 June 2024, 05:00 | Eros; TEE-01B; Naxing-3 A & B | SSO | Jiuquan | Success | |
| Ceres-1S Y3 | 29 August 2024; 05:22 | Yunyao-1 (15,16,17); Jitianxing A-03; Suxing 1-01; Tianfu Gaofen 2 | SSO | Special converted barge (Dong Fang Hang Tian Gang); Offshore waters of Rizhao, Yellow Sea | Success | |
| Ceres-1S Y4 | 19 December 2024; 10:18 | Tianqi 30-33 | LEO | Special converted barge (Dong Fang Hang Tian Gang); Offshore waters of Rizhao, Yellow Sea | Success | |
| Ceres-1 Y16 | 20 January 2025; 10:11 | Yunyao-1 37-40; Jitianxing A-05 | SSO | Jiuquan | Success | |
| Ceres-1 Y10 | 17 March 2025; 08:07 | Yunyao-1 55-60; AIRSAT-06 (Zhongke 06); AIRSAT-07 (Zhongke 07) | SSO | Jiuquan | Success | |
| Ceres-1 Y17 | 21 March 2025; 11:07 | Yunyao-1 43-48 | SSO | Jiuquan | Success | |
| Ceres-1S Y5 | 19 May 2025; 07:38 | Tianqi 34-37 | LEO | Special converted barge (Dong Fang Hang Tian Gang); Offshore waters of Rizhao, Yellow Sea | Success | |
| Ceres-1 Y15 | 5 September 2025; 11:39 | Kaiyun-1; Yuxing-3 08; Yunyao-1 27 | SSO | Jiuquan | Success | |
| Ceres-1 Y19 | 10 November 2025; 04:02 | Jilin-1 Gaofen-04C; Jilin-1 Pingtai 02A-04; Zhongbei University-1 | SSO | Jiuquan | Failure | 4th stage shut down prematurely 510 seconds into the burn. |
| Ceres-1S Y7 | 15 January 2026; 20:10 | Tianqi-1 38-41 | LEO | Special converted barge (DeFu 15001); Offshore waters of Rizhao, Yellow Sea | Success | |
| Ceres-1S Y8 | 21 October 2026; 03:39 | Xiguang IV-01 | LEO | Special converted barge (Dong Fang Hang Tian Gang); Offshore waters of Rizhao, Yellow Sea | Success | |

=== Ceres-2 launches ===
| Rocket & Serial | Date | Payload | Orbit | Launch site | Outcome | Remarks |
|---|---|---|---|---|---|---|
| Ceres-2 Y1 | 17 January 2026 | unknown | SSO | Jiuquan | Failure | First flight of Ceres-2. |
| Ceres-2 Y3 | 6 November 2026; 23:37 | Guanlan, Yunyao-1 28, North University of China No. 1, Juntian-1 06A | SSO | Jiuquan | Success | First successful flight of Ceres-2. |

=== Pallas-1 launches ===
| Serial No. | Rocket & serial | Date (UTC) | Launch site | Payload | Orbit | Outcome | Booster Recovery |
|---|---|---|---|---|---|---|---|
| 1 | Pallas-1 | 1 September 2026; 02:00 | Jiuquan | Boilerplate (Demo flight) | LEO | Success | No attempt |
| 1 | First test flight of Pallas-1 | | | | | | |
