= ExPace =

Chinese state-owned company. Launching Kuaizhou solid fuel rockets

- Type: State-owned company
- Industry: Aerospace
- Founded: February 2016; 10 years ago
- Headquarters: Wuhan, Hubei, China
- Parent: China Aerospace Science and Industry Corporation (CASIC)
- Website: expace.com.cn (archived)

ExPace (ExPace Technology Corporation; also called CASIC Rocket Technology Company) is a Chinese state-owned space rocket company, based in Wuhan, Hubei, China. Its corporate compound is located at the Wuhan National Space Industry Base space industrial park. ExPace is a wholly owned subsidiary of spacecraft and missile maker China Aerospace Science and Industry Corporation (CASIC), a Chinese state-owned company, and serves as its commercial rocket division. ExPace is focused on small satellite launchers to low Earth orbit. ExPace was established in February 2016. ExPace was founded as a Chinese commercial launch vehicle company.

== Kuaizhou launch vehicles ==
ExPace's line of Kuaizhou (KZ; Chinese: 快舟; pinyin: Kuài-Zhōu; lit. 'fast vessel') launch vehicles use solid rocket motors, thus being available all the time once built, without need to fuel the rockets. The Kuaizhou (Fast Vessel) launch vehicles are based on Chinese ASAT and BMD mid-course interceptor launch vehicles. Development on the KZ launch vehicles started in 2009. ExPace charges about US$10,000/kg for launches.

- Kuaizhou 1 (KZ-1):
  200 kg (440 lb) to SSO;
  First launch: 25 September 2013;
- Kuaizhou 1A:
  300 kg (660 lb) to LEO;
  First launch: 9 January 2017;
- Kuaizhou 11 (KZ-11):
  2.2 m (7 ft 3 in) diameter; 2.2–2.6 m (7 ft 3 in – 8 ft 6 in) payload fairing; 78,000 kg (172,000 lb) lift-off mass; 1,500 kg (3,300 lb) to LEO; 1,000 kg (2,200 lb) to SSO; US$10,000/kg;
  First launch: 10 July 2020.

== Marketplace ==
The first commercial space launch company in China, China Sanjiang Space Group Co., another subsidiary of CASIC, is planning it first launch for 2017, using ExPace's KZ-11 launch vehicle. The KZ-11 launch vehicle has launched but failed to reach orbit on 10 July 2020.

ExPace is in competition with several other Chinese space rocket startups, including LandSpace, Galactic Energy, LinkSpace, i-Space, OneSpace and Deep Blue Aerospace.

== See also ==
- LandSpace
- LinkSpace
- OneSpace
