= Deep Blue Aerospace =

Chinese aerospace company

Jiangsu Deep Blue Aerospace Technology Co., Ltd.
- Founded: 2016
- Founder: Huo Liang
- Website: www.dbaspace.com/about.html

Jiangsu Deep Blue Aerospace Technology Co., Ltd. (Chinese: 深蓝航天; lit. 'Deep Blue Aerospace') is a private space launch enterprise founded in November 2016 by Huo Liang. The company is located in Jiangsu province on the East coast of China. It is engaged in the development of reusable rockets.

== Nebula-1 ==
The company is developing the medium-class orbital launch vehicle Nebula-1 (Xingyun-1, 星云-1). The rocket will use the 20-ton-thrust kerolox engine named Leiting-20.

In January 2022, the company secured nearly $31.5 million in funding. On April 19, the company announced a new round of funding led by CMBC International Holdings, which will be put towards developing the Nebula-1, the "Thunder" engine series, and other manufacturing processes. The amount raised was not disclosed.

In 2022, the first orbital launch and recovery of the Nebula-1 was planned for late 2024. In March 2025, it was planned for mid-2025. In December 2025, it was planned for early 2026. It is now planned for Q2 2026.

== Nebula-2 ==
Nebula-2 is a medium to heavy-lift liquid-fueled rocket powered by liquid oxygen and kerosene capable of lifting 20,000 kg of payload into LEO. The rocket was planned to be launched in late 2025. It's now expected to deliver 25,000 kg of payload to the same orbit and planned for 2026.

== Competition ==
Deep Blue Aerospace is in competition with several other Chinese rocket launcher startups including Galactic Energy, LandSpace, i-Space, Space Pioneer, LinkSpace, ExPace, OneSpace, and Orienspace.
