= Orienspace =

Chinese private space launch enterprise

Orienspace Technology (Shandong) Co., Ltd
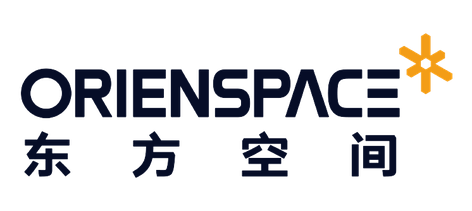

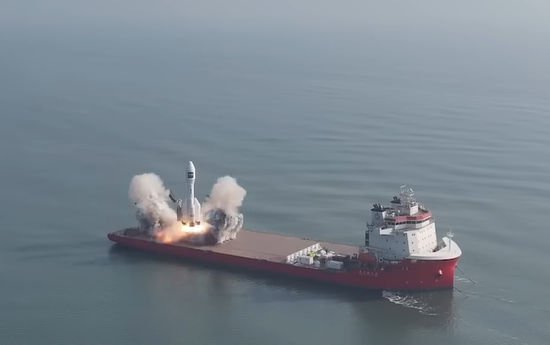
- Trade name: Orienspace
- Native name: 东方空间（山东）科技有限公司
- Type: Private
- Industry: Aerospace
- Founded: 9 June 2020; 6 years ago
- Headquarters: Yantai, Shandong, China
- Website: www.orienspace.com

Orienspace Technology (Shandong) Co., Ltd (Orienspace for short) is a commercial aerospace enterprise in China founded in 2020. The company designs and manufactures Gravity Series launch vehicles and Force Series rocket engines.

== Background ==
Orienspace is headquartered in Shandong Province, where an assembly, integration and test center is being built for future activities.

The company also established an R&D center in Beijing Office and a headquarters of aerospace propulsion technology in Wuxi, Jiangsu Province.

As of October 2023, Orienspace has raised four rounds of financing, totaling over 150 million USD.

In January 2024, Orienspace secures 600 million yuan of funding for rocket development amid soaring demand in China.

== Product lineup ==
Gravity-1 is a solid-propellant medium-lift launch vehicle that can carry a payload of up to 6.5 tons to LEO or 4.2 tons to SSO, enabling the deployment of large-scale satellite constellations. Its maiden flight was conducted on 11 January 2024, breaking records as both the world's largest solid-fuel carrier rocket and China's most powerful commercial launch vehicle to date.

Gravity-2 is a planned partially recoverable heavy-lift launch vehicle. It will be a 60-meter-tall heavy-lift rocket with a liquid-fuel core stage and solid boosters. The core stage will be powered by nine Yuanli-85 engines, which are gas-generator cycle kerosene engines with a thrust of 100 tons each. Gravity-2 will be able to deliver 25.6 tons of payload to LEO, 19.1 tons to a 500-kilometer sun-synchronous orbit (SSO), or 7.7 tons to geostationary transfer orbit (GTO). It will also be partially recoverable and support missions to higher orbits such as MEO and LTO.

Gravity-3 was initially a variant of Gravity-2 that would use three core stages. It would have a payload capacity of 30.6 tons to LEO, 20.5 tons to SSO, 9.6 tons to GTO, and 8 tons to LTO. Intended to enable large-scale satellite constellation deployment and lunar exploration. Lately Orienspace has updated their official information space with an all-new version of the vehicle designed to meet even larger space construction and deep space exploration needs, capable of fulfilling most demanding launch missions for a greater period of time. It is now a super heavy-lift launch vehicle aiming for at least 100 tons of cargo capacity to LEO, 74 tons to SSO, 23 tons to GTO and full reusability.

== List of launches ==
=== Gravity-1 launches ===
Serial number	Flight number	Date (UTC)	Launch site	Payload	Orbit	Outcome
1	Gravity-1 Y1	11 January 2024; 05:30 UTC	Special converted barge (Dong Fang Hang Tian Gang); Offshore waters of Haiyang Port	Yunyao-1 18–20 weather satellites	LEO (50° inclination, 500 km (310 mi; 270 nmi) circular)	Success
2	Gravity-1 Y2	11 October 2025; 02:20 UTC	Special converted barge (Dong Fang Hang Tian Gang); Offshore waters of Haiyang Port	Jilin-1 Kuanfu-02B-07; Shutianyuxing 01; Shutianyuxing 02	SSO	Success
3	Gravity-1 Y4	22 July 2026; 02:54 UTC	Special converted barge (Dong Fang Hang Tian Gang); Offshore waters of Shanghai	9 Satellites	SSO	Success

== See also ==
- Sea Launch
