= Space Epoch =

Chinese space launch company

Beijing Jianyuan Technology Co., Ltd.
- Trade name: Space Epoch
- Native name: 北京箭元科技有限责任公司
- Type: Private
- Industry: Aerospace
- Founded: November 26, 2019; 6 years ago
- Headquarters: Beijing, China

Space Epoch is a Chinese space launch company based on Beijing, which is developing a stainless-steel, methane-liquid oxygen type rocket, named XZY-1 or Yuanxingzhe-1 (元行者一号). The company secured a 200 million yuan (US$27.6m) in financing in 2023. A collaboration with Taobao (Alibaba‘s e-commerce shopping platform) to make reusable rockets for parcel delivery was announced in March 2024.

== History ==
In January 2023, the company performed hot fire tests of its rocket.

The XZY-1 rocket is 64 meters tall, with a payload capacity of 6.500 kg to 1.100 km sun-synchronous orbit (SSO). The tanks are three and fours meter diameter. The cargo cabin has a volume of over 120 m^{3}. The Yuanxingzhe 1 is designed to be reusable and capable to sea landing.

First flight was planned in 2025. It's now planned for the end of 2026.

== Launches ==
Rocket & Serial	Date	Payload	Orbit	Launch Site	Outcome	Notes
Yuanxingzhe-1 (YXZ-1)	28 May 2025, 04:40 ET	None	Suborbital	Sea-based space launch centre, off the waters of the eastern province of Shandong	Success	First sea-based vertical landing of a reusable rocket in China.
