= Liquid rocket propellant =

Liquid form of rocket propellants

The highest specific impulse chemical rockets use liquid propellants (liquid-propellant rockets). They can consist of a single chemical (a monopropellant) or a mix of two chemicals, called bipropellants. Bipropellants can further be divided into two categories; hypergolic propellants, which ignite when the fuel and oxidizer make contact, and non-hypergolic propellants which require an ignition source.

About 170 different propellants made of liquid fuel have been tested, excluding minor changes to a specific propellant such as propellant additives, corrosion inhibitors, or stabilizers. In the U.S. alone at least 25 different propellant combinations have been flown.

Many factors go into choosing a propellant for a liquid-propellant rocket engine. The primary factors include ease of operation, cost, hazards/environment and performance.

== History ==
=== Development in early 20th century ===
Robert H. Goddard on March 16, 1926, holding the launching frame of the first liquid-fueled rocket

Konstantin Tsiolkovsky proposed the use of liquid propellants in 1903, in his article Exploration of Outer Space by Means of Rocket Devices.

On March 16, 1926, Robert H. Goddard used liquid oxygen (LOX) and gasoline as propellants for his first partially successful liquid-propellant rocket launch. Both propellants are readily available, cheap and highly energetic. Oxygen is a moderate cryogen as air will not liquefy against a liquid oxygen tank, so it is possible to store LOX briefly in a rocket without excessive insulation.

In Germany, engineers and scientists began building and testing liquid propulsion rockets in the late 1920s. According to Max Valier, two liquid-propellant Opel RAK rockets were launched in Rüsselsheim on April 10 and April 12, 1929.

=== World War II era ===
Germany had very active rocket development before and during World War II, both for the strategic V-2 rocket and other missiles. The V-2 used an alcohol/LOX liquid-propellant engine, with hydrogen peroxide to drive the fuel pumps. The alcohol was mixed with water for engine cooling. Both Germany and the United States developed reusable liquid-propellant rocket engines that used a storeable liquid oxidizer with much greater density than LOX and a liquid fuel that ignited spontaneously on contact with the high density oxidizer.

The major manufacturer of German rocket engines for military use, the HWK firm, manufactured the RLM-numbered 109-500-designation series of rocket engine systems, and either used hydrogen peroxide as a monopropellant for Starthilfe rocket-propulsive assisted takeoff needs; or as a form of thrust for MCLOS-guided air-sea glide bombs; and used in a bipropellant combination of the same oxidizer with a fuel mixture of hydrazine hydrate and methyl alcohol for rocket engine systems intended for manned combat aircraft propulsion purposes.

The U.S. engine designs were fueled with the bipropellant combination of nitric acid as the oxidizer; and aniline as the fuel. Both engines were used to power aircraft, the Me 163 Komet interceptor in the case of the Walter 509-series German engine designs, and RATO units from both nations (as with the Starthilfe system for the Luftwaffe) to assist take-off of aircraft, which comprised the primary purpose for the case of the U.S. liquid-fueled rocket engine technology - much of it coming from the mind of U.S. Navy officer Robert Truax.

=== 1950s and 1960s ===
During the 1950s and 1960s there was a great burst of activity by propellant chemists to find high-energy liquid and solid propellants better suited to the military. Large strategic missiles need to sit in land-based or submarine-based silos for many years, able to launch at a moment's notice. Propellants requiring continuous refrigeration, which cause their rockets to grow ever-thicker blankets of ice, were not practical. As the military was willing to handle and use hazardous materials, a great number of dangerous chemicals were brewed up in large batches, most of which wound up being deemed unsuitable for operational systems. In the case of nitric acid, the acid itself (HNO_{3}) was unstable, and corroded most metals, making it difficult to store. The addition of a modest amount of nitrogen tetroxide, N_{2}O_{4}, turned the mixture red and kept it from changing composition, but left the problem that nitric acid corrodes containers it is placed in, releasing gases that can build up pressure in the process. The breakthrough was the addition of a little hydrogen fluoride (HF), which forms a self-sealing metal fluoride on the interior of tank walls that Inhibited Red Fuming Nitric Acid. This made "IRFNA" storeable.

Propellant combinations based on IRFNA or pure N_{2}O_{4} as oxidizer and kerosene or hypergolic (self igniting) aniline, hydrazine or unsymmetrical dimethylhydrazine (UDMH) as fuel were then adopted in the United States and the Soviet Union for use in strategic and tactical missiles. The self-igniting storeable liquid bi-propellants have somewhat lower specific impulse than LOX/kerosene but have higher density so a greater mass of propellant can be placed in the same sized tanks. Gasoline was replaced by different hydrocarbon fuels, for example RP-1 – a highly refined grade of kerosene. This combination is quite practical for rockets that need not be stored.

== Kerosene ==
The V-2 rockets developed by Nazi Germany used LOX and ethyl alcohol. One of the main advantages of alcohol was its water content, which provided cooling in larger rocket engines. Petroleum-based fuels offered more power than alcohol, but standard gasoline and kerosene left too much soot and combustion by-products that could clog engine plumbing. In addition, they lacked the cooling properties of ethyl alcohol.

During the early 1950s, the chemical industry in the U.S. was assigned the task of formulating an improved petroleum-based rocket propellant which would not leave residue behind and also ensure that the engines would remain cool. The result was RP-1, the specifications of which were finalized by 1954. A highly refined form of jet fuel, RP-1 burned much more cleanly than conventional petroleum fuels and also posed less of a danger to ground personnel from explosive vapours. It became the propellant for most of the early American rockets and ballistic missiles such as the Atlas, Titan I, and Thor. The Soviets quickly adopted RP-1 for their R-7 missile, but the majority of Soviet launch vehicles ultimately used storable hypergolic propellants. As of 2017, it is used in the first stages of many orbital launchers.

== Hydrogen ==
Many early rocket theorists believed that hydrogen would be a marvelous propellant, since it gives the highest specific impulse. It is also considered the cleanest when oxidized with oxygen because the only by-product is water. Steam reforming of natural gas is the most common method of producing commercial bulk hydrogen at about 95% of the world production of 500 billion m^{3} in 1998. At high temperatures (700–1100 °C) and in the presence of a metal-based catalyst (nickel), steam reacts with methane to yield carbon monoxide and hydrogen.

Hydrogen is very bulky compared to other fuels; it is typically stored as a cryogenic liquid, a technique mastered in the early 1950s as part of the hydrogen bomb development program at Los Alamos. Liquid hydrogen can be stored and transported without boil-off, by using helium as a cooling refrigerant, since helium has an even lower boiling point than hydrogen. Hydrogen is lost via venting to the atmosphere only after it is loaded onto a launch vehicle, where there is no refrigeration.

In the late 1950s and early 1960s it was adopted for hydrogen-fuelled stages such as Centaur and Saturn upper stages. Hydrogen has low density even as a liquid, requiring large tanks and pumps; maintaining the necessary extreme cold requires tank insulation. This extra weight reduces the mass fraction of the stage or requires extraordinary measures such as pressure stabilization of the tanks to reduce weight. (Pressure stabilized tanks support most of the loads with internal pressure rather than with solid structures, employing primarily the tensile strength of the tank material.)

The Soviet rocket programme, in part due to a lack of technical capability, did not use liquid hydrogen as a propellant until the Energia core stage in the 1980s.

=== Upper stage use ===
The liquid-rocket engine bipropellant liquid oxygen and hydrogen offers the highest specific impulse for conventional rockets. This extra performance largely offsets the disadvantage of low density, which requires larger fuel tanks. However, a small increase in specific impulse in an upper stage application can give a significant increase in payload-to-orbit mass.

=== Comparison to kerosene ===
Launch pad fires due to spilled kerosene are more damaging than hydrogen fires, for two main reasons:

- Kerosene burns about 20% hotter in absolute temperature than hydrogen.
- Hydrogen's buoyancy. Since hydrogen is a deep cryogen it boils quickly and rises, due to its very low density as a gas. Even when hydrogen burns, the gaseous H_{2}O that is formed has a molecular weight of only 18 Da compared to 29.9 Da for air, so it also rises quickly. Spilled kerosene fuel, on the other hand, falls to the ground and if ignited can burn for hours when spilled in large quantities.

Kerosene fires unavoidably cause extensive heat damage that requires time-consuming repairs and rebuilding. This is most frequently experienced by test stand crews involved with firings of large, unproven rocket engines.

Hydrogen-fuelled engines require special design, such as running propellant lines horizontally, so that no "traps" form in the lines, which would cause pipe ruptures due to boiling in confined spaces. (The same caution applies to other cryogens such as liquid oxygen and liquid natural gas (LNG).) Liquid hydrogen fuel has an excellent safety record and performance that is well above all other practical chemical rocket propellants.

== Lithium and fluorine ==
The highest-specific-impulse chemistry ever test-fired in a rocket engine was lithium and fluorine, with hydrogen added to improve the exhaust thermodynamics (all propellants had to be kept in their own tanks, making this a tripropellant). The combination delivered 542 s specific impulse in vacuum, equivalent to an exhaust velocity of 5320 m/s. The impracticality of this chemistry highlights why exotic propellants are not actually used: to make all three components liquids, the hydrogen must be kept below −252 °C (just 21 K), and the lithium must be kept above 180 °C (453 K). Lithium and fluorine are both extremely corrosive. Lithium ignites on contact with air, and fluorine ignites most fuels on contact, including hydrogen. Fluorine and the hydrogen fluoride (HF) in the exhaust are very toxic, which makes working around the launch pad difficult, damages the environment, and makes getting a launch license more difficult. Both lithium and fluorine are expensive compared to most rocket propellants. This combination has therefore never flown.

== Methane ==
Liquid methane and liquid oxygen used together as rocket propellants are known as methalox propulsion. Methane is the primary component of natural gas, and in its liquid form it offers several operational properties useful for rocket propulsion. Compared with liquid hydrogen, liquid methane provides lower specific impulse but is easier to store, transport and handle due to its higher boiling point, higher density, and resistance to hydrogen embrittlement. Methane also produces less carbon-based residue than kerosene, which can reduce cleaning and inspection requirements for reusable engines.

The potential to synthesize methane and oxygen on Mars via the Sabatier reaction has also made the combination attractive for long-duration mission planning. In NASA’s Mars Design Reference Mission 5.0 studies (2009–2012), methalox was baselined for the crewed lander stage.

During the 2010s and 2020s, multiple launch providers began developing methane-fueled engines and vehicles. Several news outlets described the period as a "methalox race" to achieve the first orbital launch using methane propulsion.

As of September 2026, seven methalox launch vehicles have reached orbit:

- Zhuque-2 — Reached orbit on its second flight on 12 July 2023, becoming the first methane-fueled rocket to do so. Developed by LandSpace, the vehicle uses the TQ-12 and associated methalox engines.
- Vulcan Centaur — Reached orbit on its first launch (Cert-1) on 8 January 2024. Its first stage uses Blue Origin’s methalox BE-4 engine; the second stage uses the hydrolox RL10.
- New Glenn — Reached orbit on its first flight on 16 January 2025. The rocket is powered by methalox BE-4 engines on the first stage and hydrolox BE-3U engines on the second stage.
- Zhuque-3 — Reached orbit on its first flight on 3 December 2025. Developed by LandSpace, the vehicle uses nine TQ-12A engines on the first stage and one TQ-15A engine on the second stage.
- Long March 12A — Reached orbit on its first flight on 23 December 2025. Developed by Shanghai Academy of Spaceflight Technology, the vehicle uses seven Longyun-70 engines on the first stage and one YF-209V engine on the second stage.
- Long March 10B — Reached orbit on its first flight on 10 July 2026. The rocket uses one methalox YF-219 engine on the second stage. The first stage uses kerolox engines.
- Starship — Reached orbit with 26 Starlink V3 satellites payload on flight 14 on September 28, 2026. Achieved a transatmospheric orbit on its third test flight on 14 March 2024. It uses the methalox Raptor engine.

Other methalox vehicles and engines in testing or development include:

- Neutron — In development, uses nine methalox Archimedes engines on the first stage and Archimedes Vacuum on the second stage.
- Nova — In development, using a methalox Zenith engine on the first stage and a hydrolox engine on the second stage.
- Terran R — In development, uses 13 methalox Aeon R engines on the first stage and one Aeon Vac on the second stage.
- Hyperbola-3 — In development, uses nine methalox JD-2 engines.
- Long March 9 — In development, uses 30 YF-215 engines on the first stage and two on the second.
- Long March 10C — In development, uses YF-219 engines on both stages.
- Yuanxingzhe-1 — In development.
- Blue Whale 1 — In development, uses 9 methalox engines on the first stage, and a different methalox engine on the second stage.
- Prometheus engine — In development, 980 kN (220,000 lb_{f}) methalox engine being developed by the European Space Agency. Completed hot-fire tests in 2023.
- MR10 engine — In development; to be used on the FD1 demonstrator and the Vega E rocket

An abandoned attempt:

- Terran 1 — Attempted orbit on 22 March 2023 using Relativity Space’s methalox Aeon 1 engine; the program was discontinued after the flight.

== Monopropellants ==
High-test peroxide
High test peroxide is concentrated hydrogen peroxide, with around 2% to 30% water. It decomposes to steam and oxygen when passed over a catalyst. This was historically used for reaction control systems, due to being easily storable. It is often used to drive turbopumps, being used on the V2 rocket, and modern Soyuz.
Hydrazine
decomposes energetically to nitrogen, hydrogen, and ammonia (2N_{2}H_{4} → N_{2} + H_{2} + 2NH_{3}) and is the most widely used in space vehicles. (Non-oxidized ammonia decomposition is endothermic and would decrease performance.)
Nitrous oxide
decomposes to nitrogen and oxygen.
Steam
when externally heated gives a reasonably modest I_{sp} of up to 190 seconds, depending on material corrosion and thermal limits.

== Present use ==
Kerosene (RP-1) / liquid oxygen (LOX)
Used for the lower stages of the Soyuz-2, Angara A5, Long March 6, Long March 7, Long March 8, Tianlong-2, and Pallas-1; boosters of Long March 5; the first stage of Atlas V and Long March 10B; both stages of Electron, Falcon 9, Falcon Heavy, Firefly Alpha, Kinetica 2, Long March 12, Long March 12B, Tianlong-3, Angara-1.2, and Soyuz-5; and all three stages of Nuri.
Liquid hydrogen (LH) / LOX
Used in the stages of the Space Launch System, H3, GSLV, LVM3, Long March 5, Long March 7A, Long March 8, Ariane 6, New Glenn and Centaur.
Liquid methane (LNG) / LOX
Used in both stages of Zhuque-2E, Zhuque-3, Starship, Long March 12A; the first stage of the Vulcan Centaur and New Glenn; and the second stage of Long March 10B.
Liquid propane / LOX
Used in both stages of Spectrum.
Unsymmetrical dimethylhydrazine (UDMH) or monomethylhydrazine (MMH) / dinitrogen tetroxide (NTO or N_{2}O_{4})
Used in three first stages of the Russian Proton booster, Indian Vikas engine for PSLV, GSLV, and LVM3 rockets, many Chinese boosters, a number of military, orbital and deep space rockets, as this fuel combination is hypergolic and storable for long periods at reasonable temperatures and pressures.
Hydrazine (N_{2}H_{4})
Used in deep space missions because it is storable and hypergolic, and can be used as a monopropellant with a catalyst.
Aerozine-50 (50/50 hydrazine and UDMH)
Used in deep space missions because it is storable and hypergolic, and can be used as a monopropellant with a catalyst.

== Table ==
To approximate I_{sp} at other chamber pressures
Absolute pressure kPa; atm (psi)	Multiply by
6,895 kPa; 68.05 atm (1,000 psi)	1.00
6,205 kPa; 61.24 atm (900 psi)	0.99
5,516 kPa; 54.44 atm (800 psi)	0.98
4,826 kPa; 47.63 atm (700 psi)	0.97
4,137 kPa; 40.83 atm (600 psi)	0.95
3,447 kPa; 34.02 atm (500 psi)	0.93
2,758 kPa; 27.22 atm (400 psi)	0.91
2,068 kPa; 20.41 atm (300 psi)	0.88

The table uses data from the JANNAF thermochemical tables (Joint Army-Navy-NASA-Air Force (JANNAF) Interagency Propulsion Committee) throughout, with best-possible specific impulse calculated by Rocketdyne under the assumptions of adiabatic combustion, isentropic expansion, one-dimensional expansion and shifting equilibrium. Some units have been converted to metric, but pressures have not.

=== Definitions ===
V_{e}
Average exhaust velocity, m/s. The same measure as specific impulse in different units, numerically equal to specific impulse in N·s/kg.
r
Mixture ratio: mass oxidizer / mass fuel
T_{c}
Chamber temperature, °C
d
Bulk density of fuel and oxidizer, g/cm^{3}
C*
Characteristic velocity, m/s. Equal to chamber pressure multiplied by throat area, divided by mass flow rate. Used to check experimental rocket's combustion efficiency.

=== Bipropellants ===
Oxidizer	Fuel	Comment	Optimal expansion from 68.05 atm to									
Oxidizer	Fuel	Comment	1 atm					0 atm, vacuum (nozzle area ratio 40:1)				
Oxidizer	Fuel	Comment	V_{e}	r	T_{c}	d	C*	V_{e}	r	T_{c}	d	C*
LOX	H_{2}	Hydrolox, common	3816	4.13	2740	0.29	2416	4462	4.83	2978	0.32	2386
LOX	H_{2}:Be 49:51		4498	0.87	2558	0.23	2833	5295	0.91	2589	0.24	2850
LOX	CH_{4}	Methalox, common	3034	3.21	3260	0.82	1857	3615	3.45	3290	0.83	1838
LOX	C_{2}H_{6}		3006	2.89	3320	0.90	1840	3584	3.10	3351	0.91	1825
LOX	C_{2}H_{4}		3053	2.38	3486	0.88	1875	3635	2.59	3521	0.89	1855
LOX	RP-1	Kerolox, common	2941	2.58	3403	1.03	1799	3510	2.77	3428	1.03	1783
LOX	N_{2}H_{4}		3065	0.92	3132	1.07	1892	3460	0.98	3146	1.07	1878
LOX	B_{5}H_{9}		3124	2.12	3834	0.92	1895	3758	2.16	3863	0.92	1894
LOX	B_{2}H_{6}		3351	1.96	3489	0.74	2041	4016	2.06	3563	0.75	2039
LOX	CH_{4}:H_{2} 92.6:7.4		3126	3.36	3245	0.71	1920	3719	3.63	3287	0.72	1897
GOX	GH_{2}	Gaseous form	3997	3.29	2576	—	2550	4485	3.92	2862	—	2519
F_{2}	H_{2}		4036	7.94	3689	0.46	2556	4697	9.74	3985	0.52	2530
F_{2}	H_{2}:Li 65.2:34.0		4256	0.96	1830	0.19	2680					
F_{2}	H_{2}:Li 60.7:39.3							5050	1.08	1974	0.21	2656
F_{2}	CH_{4}		3414	4.53	3918	1.03	2068	4075	4.74	3933	1.04	2064
F_{2}	C_{2}H_{6}		3335	3.68	3914	1.09	2019	3987	3.78	3923	1.10	2014
F_{2}	MMH		3413	2.39	4074	1.24	2063	4071	2.47	4091	1.24	1987
F_{2}	N_{2}H_{4}		3580	2.32	4461	1.31	2219	4215	2.37	4468	1.31	2122
F_{2}	NH_{3}		3531	3.32	4337	1.12	2194	4143	3.35	4341	1.12	2193
F_{2}	B_{5}H_{9}		3502	5.14	5050	1.23	2147	4191	5.58	5083	1.25	2140
OF_{2}	H_{2}		4014	5.92	3311	0.39	2542	4679	7.37	3587	0.44	2499
OF_{2}	CH_{4}		3485	4.94	4157	1.06	2160	4131	5.58	4207	1.09	2139
OF_{2}	C_{2}H_{6}		3511	3.87	4539	1.13	2176	4137	3.86	4538	1.13	2176
OF_{2}	RP-1		3424	3.87	4436	1.28	2132	4021	3.85	4432	1.28	2130
OF_{2}	MMH		3427	2.28	4075	1.24	2119	4067	2.58	4133	1.26	2106
OF_{2}	N_{2}H_{4}		3381	1.51	3769	1.26	2087	4008	1.65	3814	1.27	2081
OF_{2}	MMH:N_{2}H_{4}:H_{2}O 50.5:29.8:19.7		3286	1.75	3726	1.24	2025	3908	1.92	3769	1.25	2018
OF_{2}	B_{2}H_{6}		3653	3.95	4479	1.01	2244	4367	3.98	4486	1.02	2167
OF_{2}	B_{5}H_{9}		3539	4.16	4825	1.20	2163	4239	4.30	4844	1.21	2161
F_{2}:O_{2} 30:70	H_{2}		3871	4.80	2954	0.32	2453	4520	5.70	3195	0.36	2417
F_{2}:O_{2} 30:70	RP-1		3103	3.01	3665	1.09	1908	3697	3.30	3692	1.10	1889
F_{2}:O_{2} 70:30	RP-1		3377	3.84	4361	1.20	2106	3955	3.84	4361	1.20	2104
F_{2}:O_{2} 87.8:12.2	MMH		3525	2.82	4454	1.24	2191	4148	2.83	4453	1.23	2186
N_{2}F_{4}	CH_{4}		3127	6.44	3705	1.15	1917	3692	6.51	3707	1.15	1915
N_{2}F_{4}	C_{2}H_{4}		3035	3.67	3741	1.13	1844	3612	3.71	3743	1.14	1843
N_{2}F_{4}	MMH		3163	3.35	3819	1.32	1928	3730	3.39	3823	1.32	1926
N_{2}F_{4}	N_{2}H_{4}		3283	3.22	4214	1.38	2059	3827	3.25	4216	1.38	2058
N_{2}F_{4}	NH_{3}		3204	4.58	4062	1.22	2020	3723	4.58	4062	1.22	2021
N_{2}F_{4}	B_{5}H_{9}		3259	7.76	4791	1.34	1997	3898	8.31	4803	1.35	1992
ClF_{5}	MMH		2962	2.82	3577	1.40	1837	3488	2.83	3579	1.40	1837
ClF_{5}	N_{2}H_{4}		3069	2.66	3894	1.47	1935	3580	2.71	3905	1.47	1934
ClF_{5}	MMH:N_{2}H_{4} 86:14		2971	2.78	3575	1.41	1844	3498	2.81	3579	1.41	1844
ClF_{5}	MMH:N_{2}H_{4}:N_{2}H_{5}NO_{3} 55:26:19		2989	2.46	3717	1.46	1864	3500	2.49	3722	1.46	1863
ClF_{3}	MMH:N_{2}H_{4}:N_{2}H_{5}NO_{3} 55:26:19	Hypergolic	2789	2.97	3407	1.42	1739	3274	3.01	3413	1.42	1739
ClF_{3}	N_{2}H_{4}	Hypergolic	2885	2.81	3650	1.49	1824	3356	2.89	3666	1.50	1822
N_{2}O_{4}	MMH	Hypergolic, common	2827	2.17	3122	1.19	1745	3347	2.37	3125	1.20	1724
N_{2}O_{4}	MMH:Be 76.6:29.4		3106	0.99	3193	1.17	1858	3720	1.10	3451	1.24	1849
N_{2}O_{4}	MMH:Al 63:27		2891	0.85	3294	1.27	1785					
N_{2}O_{4}	MMH:Al 58:42							3460	0.87	3450	1.31	1771
N_{2}O_{4}	N_{2}H_{4}	Hypergolic, common	2862	1.36	2992	1.21	1781	3369	1.42	2993	1.22	1770
N_{2}O_{4}	Aerozine 50 (N_{2}H_{4}:UDMH 50:50)	Hypergolic, common	2831	1.98	3095	1.12	1747	3349	2.15	3096	1.20	1731
N_{2}O_{4}	N_{2}H_{4}:Be 80:20		3209	0.51	3038	1.20	1918					
N_{2}O_{4}	N_{2}H_{4}:Be 76.6:23.4							3849	0.60	3230	1.22	1913
N_{2}O_{4}	B_{5}H_{9}		2927	3.18	3678	1.11	1782	3513	3.26	3706	1.11	1781
NO:N_{2}O_{4} 25:75	MMH		2839	2.28	3153	1.17	1753	3360	2.50	3158	1.18	1732
NO:N_{2}O_{4} 25:75	N_{2}H_{4}:Be 76.6:23.4		2872	1.43	3023	1.19	1787	3381	1.51	3026	1.20	1775
IRFNA IIIa	UDMH:DETA 60:40	Hypergolic	2638	3.26	2848	1.30	1627	3123	3.41	2839	1.31	1617
IRFNA IIIa	MMH	Hypergolic	2690	2.59	2849	1.27	1665	3178	2.71	2841	1.28	1655
IRFNA IIIa	UDMH	Hypergolic	2668	3.13	2874	1.26	1648	3157	3.31	2864	1.27	1634
IRFNA IV HDA	UDMH:DETA 60:40	Hypergolic	2689	3.06	2903	1.32	1656	3187	3.25	2951	1.33	1641
IRFNA IV HDA	MMH	Hypergolic	2742	2.43	2953	1.29	1696	3242	2.58	2947	1.31	1680
IRFNA IV HDA	UDMH	Hypergolic	2719	2.95	2983	1.28	1676	3220	3.12	2977	1.29	1662
H_{2}O_{2}	MMH		2790	3.46	2720	1.24	1726	3301	3.69	2707	1.24	1714
H_{2}O_{2}	N_{2}H_{4}		2810	2.05	2651	1.24	1751	3308	2.12	2645	1.25	1744
H_{2}O_{2}	N_{2}H_{4}:Be 74.5:25.5		3289	0.48	2915	1.21	1943	3954	0.57	3098	1.24	1940
H_{2}O_{2}	B_{5}H_{9}		3016	2.20	2667	1.02	1828	3642	2.09	2597	1.01	1817

Definitions of some of the mixtures:

IRFNA IIIa
83.4% HNO_{3}, 14% NO_{2}, 2% H_{2}O, 0.6% HF
IRFNA IV HDA
54.3% HNO_{3}, 44% NO_{2}, 1% H_{2}O, 0.7% HF
RP-1
See MIL-P-25576C, basically kerosene (approximately C_{10}H_{18})
MMH monomethylhydrazine
CH_{3}NHNH_{2}

Has not all data for CO/O_{2}, purposed for NASA for Martian-based rockets, only a specific impulse about 250 s.

r
Mixture ratio: mass oxidizer / mass fuel
V_{e}
Average exhaust velocity, m/s. The same measure as specific impulse in different units, numerically equal to specific impulse in N·s/kg.
C*
Characteristic velocity, m/s. Equal to chamber pressure multiplied by throat area, divided by mass flow rate. Used to check experimental rocket's combustion efficiency.
T_{c}
Chamber temperature, °C
d
Bulk density of fuel and oxidizer, g/cm^{3}

=== Monopropellants ===
Propellant	Comment	Optimal expansion from 68.05 atm to 1 atm				Expansion from 68.05 atm to vacuum (0 atm) (Area_{nozzle} = 40:1)			
Propellant	Comment	V_{e}	T_{c}	d	C*	V_{e}	T_{c}	d	C*
ammonium dinitramide (LMP-103S)	PRISMA mission (2010–2015); 5 S/Cs launched 2016		1608	1.24			1608	1.24	
hydrazine	common		883	1.01			883	1.01	
hydrogen peroxide	common	1610	1270	1.45	1040	1860	1270	1.45	1040
hydroxylammonium nitrate (AF-M315E)			1893	1.46			1893	1.46	
nitromethane									
Propellant	Comment	V_{e}	T_{c}	d	C*	V_{e}	T_{c}	d	C*
