= Rocket propellant =

Chemical or mixture used in a rocket engine

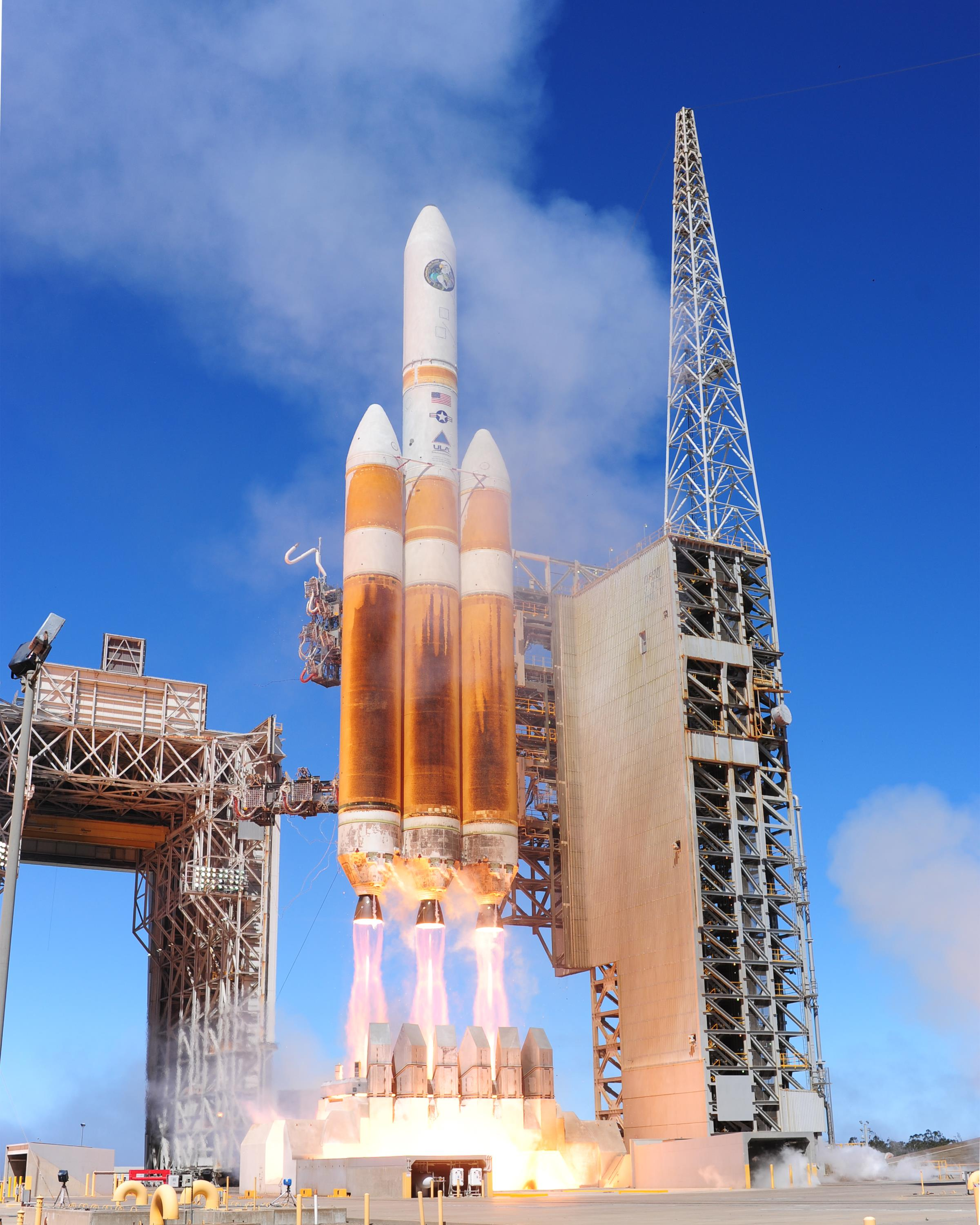
A Delta IV Heavy during liftoff. The rocket is launched using liquid hydrogen and liquid oxygen cryogenic propellants.

Rocket propellant is used as a reaction mass ejected from a rocket engine to produce thrust. The energy required can either come from the propellants themselves, as with a chemical rocket, or from an external source, as with ion engines or nuclear engines.

== Overview ==
Rockets create thrust by expelling mass rearward, at high velocity. The thrust produced can be calculated by multiplying the mass flow rate of the propellants by their exhaust velocity relative to the rocket (specific impulse). A rocket can be thought of as being accelerated by the pressure of the combusting gases against the combustion chamber and nozzle, not by "pushing" against the air behind or below it. Rocket engines perform best in outer space because of the lack of air pressure on the outside of the engine. In space it is also possible to fit a longer nozzle without suffering from flow separation.

Most chemical propellants release energy through redox chemistry, more specifically combustion. As such, both an oxidizing agent and a reducing agent (fuel) must be present in the mixture. Decomposition, such as that of highly unstable peroxide bonds in monopropellant rockets, can also be the source of energy.

In the case of bipropellant liquid rockets, a mixture of reducing fuel and oxidizing oxidizer is introduced into a combustion chamber, typically using a turbopump to overcome the pressure. As combustion takes place, the liquid propellant mass is converted into a huge volume of gas at high temperature and pressure. This exhaust stream is ejected from the engine nozzle at high velocity, creating an opposing force that propels the rocket forward in accordance with Newton's laws of motion.

Chemical rockets can be grouped by phase. Solid rockets use propellant in the solid phase, liquid fuel rockets use propellant in the liquid phase, gas fuel rockets use propellant in the gas phase, and hybrid rockets use a combination of solid and liquid or gaseous propellants.

In the case of solid rocket motors, the fuel and oxidizer are combined when the motor is cast. Propellant combustion occurs inside the motor casing, which must contain the pressures developed. Solid rockets typically have higher thrust, less specific impulse, shorter burn times, and a higher mass than liquid rockets, and additionally cannot be stopped once lit.

=== Rocket stages ===
In space, the maximum change in velocity that a rocket stage can impart on its payload is primarily a function of its mass ratio and its exhaust velocity. This relationship is described by the rocket equation. Exhaust velocity is dependent on the propellant and engine used and closely related to specific impulse, the total energy delivered to the rocket vehicle per unit of propellant mass consumed. The mass ratio can also be affected by the choice of a given propellant.

Rocket stages that fly through the atmosphere usually use lower-performing, high-molecular-mass, high-density propellants due to the smaller and lighter tankage required. Upper stages, which mostly or only operate in the vacuum of space, tend to use the high-energy, high-performance, low-density liquid hydrogen fuel. For future planetary missions the use of local resources and solar energy for in situ propellant production is considered.

== Solid chemical propellants ==
Solid propellants come in two main types. "Composites" are mostly a mixture of granules of solid oxidizer, such as ammonium nitrate, ammonium dinitramide, ammonium perchlorate, or potassium nitrate in a polymer binding agent, with flakes or powders of energetic fuel compounds such as RDX, HMX, aluminium or beryllium. Plasticizers, stabilizers, and burn rate modifiers (e.g. iron oxide or copper oxide) can be added.

Single-, double-, or triple-bases are homogeneous mixtures of one to three primary ingredients, which must include fuel and oxidizer, and often include binders and plasticizers. All components are macroscopically indistinguishable and often blended as liquids and cured in a single batch. Ingredients can have multiple roles: RDX is both fuel and oxidizer, while nitrocellulose is fuel, oxidizer, and structural polymer.

Many propellants contain elements of double-base and composite propellants, and often contain energetic additives homogeneously mixed into the binder. In the case of gunpowder (a pressed composite without a polymeric binder), the fuel is charcoal, the oxidizer is potassium nitrate, and sulfur serves as a reaction catalyst while also being consumed to form reaction products such as potassium sulfide.

The newest nitramine solid propellants based on CL-20 (HNIW) can match the performance of NTO/UDMH storable liquid propellants, but cannot be throttled or restarted.

Extraterrestrial on-site production is being explored by combining aluminium and ice (ALICE).

=== Advantages ===
Solid-propellant rockets are much easier to store and handle than liquid-propellant rockets. High propellant density makes for compact size as well. These features plus simplicity and low cost make solid-propellant rockets ideal for military applications.

Their simplicity also makes solid rockets a good choice whenever large amounts of thrust are needed and cost is an issue. The Space Shuttle and many other orbital launch vehicles use solid-fueled rockets in their boost stages (solid rocket boosters) for this reason.

=== Disadvantages ===
Solid-fuel rockets have lower specific impulse, a measure of propellant efficiency, than liquid-fuel rockets. As a result, the overall performance of solid upper stages is less than liquid stages even though the solid mass ratios are usually in the .91 to .93 range, as good as or better than most liquid-propellant upper stages. The high mass ratios possible with these unsegmented solid upper stages is a result of high propellant density and very high strength-to-weight ratio casings.

A drawback to solid rockets is that they cannot be throttled in real time, although a programmed thrust schedule can be created by adjusting the interior propellant geometry. Solid rockets can be vented to extinguish combustion or reverse thrust as a means of controlling range or accommodating stage separation. Casting large amounts of propellant requires consistency and repeatability to avoid cracks and voids in the completed motor. The blending and casting take place under computer control in a vacuum, and the propellant blend is spread thin and scanned to ensure that no large gas bubbles are introduced into the motor.

Solid-fuel rockets are intolerant to cracks and voids and require post-processing such as X-ray scans to identify faults. The combustion process is dependent on the surface area of the fuel. Voids and cracks represent local increases in burning surface area, increasing the local temperature, which increases the local rate of combustion. This positive feedback loop can easily lead to catastrophic failure of the case or nozzle.

=== History ===
During the 1950s and 60s, researchers in the United States developed ammonium perchlorate composite propellant (APCP). This mixture is typically 69-70% finely ground ammonium perchlorate (an oxidizer), combined with 16-20% fine aluminium powder (a fuel), held together in a base of 11-14% polybutadiene acrylonitrile (PBAN) or hydroxyl-terminated polybutadiene (polybutadiene rubber fuel). The mixture is formed as a thickened liquid and then cast into the correct shape and cured into a firm but flexible load-bearing solid. Historically, the tally of APCP solid propellants is relatively small. The military, however, uses a wide variety of different types of solid propellants, some of which exceed the performance of APCP. A comparison of the highest specific impulses achieved with the various solid and liquid propellant combinations used in current launch vehicles is given in the article on solid-fuel rockets.

In the 1970s and 1980s, the U.S. switched entirely to solid-fueled ICBMs: the LGM-30 Minuteman and LG-118A Peacekeeper (MX). In the 1980s and 1990s, the USSR/Russia also deployed solid-fueled ICBMs (RT-23, RT-2PM, and RT-2UTTH), but retains two liquid-fueled ICBMs (R-36 and UR-100N). All solid-fueled ICBMs on both sides had three initial solid stages, and those with multiple independently targeted warheads had a precision maneuverable bus used to fine-tune the trajectories of the re-entry vehicles.

== Liquid chemical propellants ==
=== Advantages ===
Liquid-fueled rockets have higher specific impulse than solid rockets and are capable of being throttled, shut down, and restarted. Only the combustion chamber of a liquid-fueled rocket needs to withstand high combustion pressures and temperatures. Cooling can be done regeneratively with the liquid propellant. On vehicles employing turbopumps or electric pumps, the propellant tanks are at a lower pressure than the combustion chamber, decreasing tank mass. For these reasons, most orbital launch vehicles use liquid propellants.

The primary specific impulse advantage of liquid propellants is due to the availability of high-performance oxidizers. Several practical liquid oxidizers (liquid oxygen, dinitrogen tetroxide, and hydrogen peroxide) have better specific impulse than the ammonium perchlorate used in most solid rockets when paired with suitable fuels.

Some gases, particularly oxygen and nitrogen, may be able to be collected from the upper atmosphere, and transferred up to low Earth orbit for use in propellant depots at substantially reduced cost.

=== Disadvantages ===
The main difficulties with liquid propellants are also with the oxidizers. Storable oxidizers, such as nitric acid and nitrogen tetroxide, tend to be extremely toxic and highly reactive, while cryogenic propellants by definition must be stored at low temperature and can also have reactivity/toxicity issues. Liquid oxygen (LOX) is the only flown cryogenic oxidizer. Others such as FLOX, a fluorine/LOX mix, have never been flown due to instability, toxicity, and explosivity. Several other unstable, energetic, and toxic oxidizers have been proposed: liquid ozone (O_{3}), ClF_{3}, and ClF_{5}.

Liquid-fueled rockets require potentially troublesome valves, seals, and turbopumps, which increase the cost of the launch vehicle. Turbopumps are particularly troublesome due to high performance requirements.

=== Current cryogenic types ===
- Liquid oxygen (LOX) and liquid hydrogen. Used on the Centaur upper stage, most stages of the European Ariane 6, the Space Launch System core and upper stages, H3, GSLV, LVM3, Long March 5, Long March 7A, and Long March 8.
- LOX and liquid methane (from liquefied natural gas). Used on Zhuque-2E, Zhuque-3, Vulcan, New Glenn, SpaceX Starship, Long March 12A, Long March 10B, and also planned for use on several rockets in development, including Soyuz-7, Rocket Lab Neutron, Nova, Terran R, Long March 9 and Long March 10C.
- LOX and liquid propane. Used on the Aquila engines of Spectrum.

=== Current semi-cryogenic types ===
- LOX and highly refined kerosene (RP-1). Used for the first stages of the Atlas V, Falcon 9, Falcon Heavy, Soyuz, Zenit, Angara, and Long March 6, among others. This combination is widely regarded as the most practical for boosters that lift off at ground level and therefore must operate at full atmospheric pressure.

=== Current storable types ===
- Dinitrogen tetroxide (N_{2}O_{4}) and hydrazine (N_{2}H_{4}), MMH, or UDMH. Used in military, orbital, and deep-space rockets because both liquids are storable for long periods at reasonable temperatures and pressures. N_{2}O_{4}/UDMH is the main fuel for the Proton rocket, older Long March rockets (LM 1-4), PSLV, Fregat, and Briz-M upper stages. This combination is hypergolic, making for attractively simple ignition sequences. The major inconvenience is that these propellants are highly toxic and require careful handling.
- Monopropellants such as hydrogen peroxide, hydrazine, and nitrous oxide are primarily used for attitude control and spacecraft station-keeping where their long-term storability, simplicity of use, and ability to provide the tiny impulses needed outweighs their lower specific impulse as compared to bipropellants. Hydrogen peroxide is also used to drive the turbopumps on the first stage of the Soyuz launch vehicle.

=== Mixture ratio ===
The theoretical exhaust velocity of a given propellant chemistry is proportional to the energy released per unit of propellant mass (specific energy). In chemical rockets, unburned fuel or oxidizer represents the loss of chemical potential energy, which reduces the specific energy. However, most rockets run fuel-rich mixtures, which result in lower theoretical exhaust velocities.

However, fuel-rich mixtures also have lower molecular weight exhaust species. The nozzle of the rocket converts the thermal energy of the propellants into directed kinetic energy. This conversion happens in the time it takes for the propellants to flow from the combustion chamber through the engine throat and out the nozzle, usually on the order of one millisecond. Molecules store thermal energy in rotation, vibration, and translation, of which only the latter can easily be used to add energy to the rocket stage. Molecules with fewer atoms (like CO and H_{2}) have fewer available vibrational and rotational modes than molecules with more atoms (like CO_{2} and H_{2}O). Consequently, smaller molecules store less vibrational and rotational energy for a given amount of heat input, resulting in more translation energy being available to be converted to kinetic energy. The resulting improvement in nozzle efficiency is large enough that real rocket engines improve their actual exhaust velocity by running rich mixtures with somewhat lower theoretical exhaust velocities.

The effect of exhaust molecular weight on nozzle efficiency is most important for nozzles operating near sea level. High-expansion rockets operating in a vacuum see a much smaller effect, and so are run less rich.

LOX/hydrocarbon rockets are run slightly rich (O/F mass ratio of 3 rather than stoichiometric of 3.4 to 4) because the energy release per unit mass drops off quickly as the mixture ratio deviates from stoichiometric. LOX/LH_{2} rockets are run very rich (O/F mass ratio of 4 rather than stoichiometric 8) because hydrogen is so light that the energy release per unit mass of propellant drops very slowly with extra hydrogen. In fact, LOX/LH_{2} rockets are generally limited in how rich they run by the performance penalty of the mass of the extra hydrogen tankage instead of the underlying chemistry.

Another reason for running rich is that off-stoichiometric mixtures burn cooler than stoichiometric mixtures, which makes engine cooling easier. Because fuel-rich combustion products are less chemically reactive (corrosive) than oxidizer-rich combustion products, a vast majority of rocket engines are designed to run fuel-rich. At least one exception exists: the Russian RD-180 preburner, which burns LOX and RP-1 at a ratio of 2.72.

Additionally, mixture ratios can be dynamic during launch. This can be exploited with designs that adjust the oxidizer-to-fuel ratio (along with overall thrust) throughout a flight to maximize overall system performance. For instance, during lift-off, thrust is more valuable than specific impulse, and careful adjustment of the O/F ratio may allow higher thrust levels. Once the rocket is away from the launchpad, the engine O/F ratio can be tuned for higher efficiency.

=== Propellant density ===
Although liquid hydrogen gives a high I_{sp}, its low density is a disadvantage: hydrogen occupies about 7 times more volume per kilogram than dense fuels such as kerosene. The fuel tankage, plumbing, and pump must be correspondingly larger. This increases the vehicle's dry mass, reducing performance. Liquid hydrogen is also relatively expensive to produce and store, and causes difficulties with design, manufacture, and operation of the vehicle. However, liquid hydrogen is extremely well-suited to upper stage use where I_{sp} is at a premium and thrust-to-weight ratios are less relevant.

Dense-propellant launch vehicles have a higher takeoff mass due to lower I_{sp}, but can more easily develop high takeoff thrusts due to the reduced volume of engine components. This means that vehicles with dense-fueled booster stages reach orbit earlier, minimizing losses due to gravity drag and reducing the effective delta-v requirement.

The proposed tripropellant rocket uses mainly dense fuel while at low altitude and switches across to hydrogen at higher altitude. Studies in the 1960s proposed single-stage-to-orbit vehicles using this technique. The Space Shuttle approximated this by using dense solid rocket boosters for the majority of the thrust during the first 120 seconds. The main engines burned a fuel-rich hydrogen and oxygen mixture, operating continuously throughout the launch but providing the majority of thrust at higher altitudes after SRB burnout.

== Other chemical propellants ==
=== Hybrid propellants ===
Hybrid propellants consist of a storable liquid oxidizer used with a solid fuel, which retains most virtues of both liquids (high I_{SP}) and solids (simplicity).

A hybrid-propellant rocket usually has a solid fuel and a liquid or NEMA oxidizer. The fluid oxidizer can make it possible to throttle and restart the motor just like a liquid-fueled rocket. Hybrid rockets can also be environmentally safer than solid rockets since some high-performance solid-phase oxidizers contain chlorine (specifically composites with ammonium perchlorate), versus the more benign liquid oxygen or nitrous oxide often used in hybrids. This is only true for specific hybrid systems. There have been hybrids which have used chlorine or fluorine compounds as oxidizers and hazardous materials such as beryllium compounds mixed into the solid fuel grain. Because just one constituent is a fluid, hybrids can be simpler than liquid rockets that depend on the rocket's acceleration to transport the fluid into the combustion chamber. Fewer fluids typically mean fewer and smaller piping systems, valves, and pumps.

Hybrid motors suffer two major drawbacks. The first, shared with solid rocket motors, is that the casing around the fuel grain must be built to withstand the full combustion pressure and often extreme temperatures as well. However, modern composite structures handle this problem well, and when used with nitrous oxide and a solid rubber propellant (HTPB), a relatively small percentage of fuel is needed anyway, so the combustion chamber is not especially large.

The primary remaining difficulty with hybrids is with mixing the propellants during the combustion process. In solid propellants, the oxidizer and fuel are mixed in a factory in carefully controlled conditions. Liquid propellants are generally mixed by the injector at the top of the combustion chamber, which directs many small swift-moving streams of fuel and oxidizer into one another. Liquid-fueled rocket injector design has been studied at great length and still resists reliable performance prediction. In a hybrid motor, the mixing happens at the melting or evaporating surface of the fuel. The mixing is not a well-controlled process and generally, quite a lot of propellant is left unburned, which limits the efficiency of the motor. The combustion rate of the fuel is largely determined by the oxidizer flux and exposed fuel surface area. This combustion rate is not usually sufficient for high-power operations such as boost stages unless the surface area or oxidizer flux is high. Too-high oxidizer flux can lead to flooding and loss of flame-holding, which locally extinguishes the combustion. Surface area can be increased, typically by longer grains or multiple ports, but this can increase combustion chamber size, reduce grain strength, and reduce volumetric loading. Additionally, as the burn continues, the hole down the center of the grain (the "port") widens, and the mixture ratio tends to become more oxidizer-rich.

There has been much less development of hybrid motors than of solid and liquid motors. For military use, ease of handling and maintenance have driven the use of solid rockets. For orbital work, liquid fuels are more efficient than hybrids, and most development has concentrated there. There has recently been an increase in hybrid motor development for nonmilitary suborbital work:

- Several universities have recently experimented with hybrid rockets. Brigham Young University, the University of Utah, and Utah State University launched a student-designed rocket called Unity IV in 1995 which burned the solid fuel hydroxy-terminated polybutadiene (HTPB) with an oxidizer of gaseous oxygen, and in 2003 launched a larger version which burned HTPB with nitrous oxide. Stanford University researches nitrous-oxide/paraffin wax hybrid motors. UCLA has launched hybrid rockets through an undergraduate student group since 2009 using HTPB.
- The Rochester Institute of Technology was building an HTPB hybrid rocket to launch small payloads into space and to several near-Earth objects. Its first launch was in the Summer of 2007.
- Scaled Composites SpaceShipOne, the first private crewed spacecraft, was powered by a hybrid rocket burning HTPB with nitrous oxide: RocketMotorOne. The hybrid rocket engine was manufactured by SpaceDev. SpaceDev partially based its motors on experimental data collected from the testing of AMROC's (American Rocket Company) motors at NASA's Stennis Space Center's E1 test stand.

=== Gaseous propellants ===
GOX (gaseous oxygen) was used as the oxidizer for the Buran program's orbital maneuvering system.

== Inert propellants ==
Some rocket designs impart energy to their propellants with external energy sources.

=== Ion thruster ===
Ion thrusters ionize a neutral gas and create thrust by accelerating the ions by electric or magnetic fields. Ion thrusters have been used in multiple projects including NASA's Dawn and Dart missions and SpaceX's Starlink satellites.

=== Thermal rockets ===
Thermal rockets use inert propellants of low molecular weight that are chemically compatible with the heating mechanism at high temperatures. Solar thermal rockets and nuclear thermal rockets typically propose to use liquid hydrogen for a specific impulse of around 600–900 seconds, or in some cases water that is exhausted as steam for a specific impulse of about 190 seconds. Nuclear thermal rockets use the heat of nuclear fission to add energy to the propellant. Some designs separate the nuclear fuel and working fluid, minimizing the potential for radioactive contamination, but nuclear fuel loss was a persistent problem during real-world testing programs. Solar thermal rockets use concentrated sunlight to heat a propellant, rather than using a nuclear reactor.

=== Compressed gas ===
For low-performance applications, such as attitude control jets, compressed gases such as nitrogen have been employed. Energy is stored in the pressure of the inert gas. However, due to the low density of all practical gases and high mass of the pressure vessel required to contain it, compressed gases see little current use. One application of compressed gas as rocket fuel is in water rockets; compressed air is used to push the reaction mass, water, out of the plastic bottle that serves as the body of the rocket.

== Nuclear pulse propulsion ==
In Project Orion and other nuclear pulse propulsion proposals, the propellant would be superheated debris from a series of nuclear explosions.

== See also ==
- ALICE (propellant)
- Trinitramide
- Timeline of hydrogen technologies
- Category:Rocket fuels
- Comparison: Aviation fuel
- Nuclear propulsion
- Ion thruster
- Crawford burner
