= Long March 10C =

Chinese commercial heavy-lift rocket

- Function: Heavy-lift launch vehicle
- Manufacturer: China Academy of Launch Vehicle Technology (CALT)
- Country of origin: People's Republic of China

Size
- Height: ~91 m (299 ft)
- Diameter: 5 m (16 ft 5 in)
- Mass: ~940,000 kg (2,070,000 lb)
- Stages: 2

Capacity

Payload to LEO
- Altitude: 200 km (120 mi)
- Mass: 27,000 kg (60,000 lb) (expendable); 22,000 kg (49,000 lb) (booster recovered)

Associated rockets
- Family: Long March
- Based on: Long March 10B
- Comparable: Long March 5; Neutron; Zhuque-3; Falcon 9

Launch history
- Status: In development
- Launch sites: Wenchang Commercial
- Total launches: 0

First stage
- Powered by: 9 × YF-219
- Maximum thrust: SL: ~12,350 kN (2,780,000 lb_{f})
- Propellant: CH_{4} / LOX

Second stage
- Powered by: 1 × YF-219
- Maximum thrust: vac: ~1,530 kN (340,000 lb_{f})
- Propellant: CH_{4} / LOX

Long March 10C (LM-10C, Chinese: 长征十号丙; pinyin: Chángzhēng shí hào bǐng, CZ-10C) is a partially reusable two-stage heavy-lift launch vehicle developed by China Rocket, the commercial launch subsidiary of China Academy of Launch Vehicle Technology (CALT). It is the fourth in the Long March 10 series of rockets and is derived using technologies developed for the Long March 10A and the Long March 10B.

Similar to the heavy-lift Long March 5, the CZ-10B stages have five-meter diameters. Unlike other CZ-10 variants however, the CZ-10C first stage is powered by nine YF-219 engines using methane and liquid oxygen. The second stage of the CZ-10C, similar to its CZ-10B sibling, uses one vacuum-optimized YF-219 methalox engine. The CZ-10C will launch from China's HICAL commercial launch pads next to China's Wenchang Space Launch Site.

== History and design ==
In July 2026 Chinese officials confirmed that a "workhorse" commercial variant of the CZ-10 series is in the process of development; this new variant was designated the Long March 10C. The new launcher will have a more powerful methalox first-stage than the kerolox first-stage of the CZ-10A/B variants while inheriting the second-stage of the CZ-10B. CZ-10C will be an all-methalox launcher using nine YF-219 engines on its first stage (for a total sea-level thrust of about 12,350 kN (2,780,000 lb_{f})) and a single vacuum-optimized YF-219 engine on its second stage; it will be approximately 91 metres in height. It likely will have a payload capacity in excess of 25 tonnes (55,000 lb) to LEO, exceeding that of the CZ-5B.

CZ-10C's first stage will be capable of recovery and reuse; the stage recovery method will likely involve the use of landing legs either at land-based or barge-based landing pads.

== See also ==
- China National Space Administration – National space agency of the People's Republic of China
- List of Long March launches (2025-2029)
- Comparison of orbital launchers families
- Comparison of orbital launch systems
- Space program of China
