= Pallas-1 =

Partially reusable orbital launch vehicle by Galactic Energy

- Function: Launch Vehicle
- Manufacturer: Galactic Energy
- Country of origin: China

Size
- Height: 52 m (171 ft)
- Diameter: 3.35 m (11.0 ft)
- Mass: 283,000 kg (624,000 lb)
- Stages: 3

Capacity

Payload to 400 km (250 mi) LEO
- Mass: 7,000 kg (15,000 lb)

Payload to 700 km (430 mi) SSO
- Mass: 3,000 kg (6,600 lb)

Associated rockets
- Comparable: GSLV, Long March 4A, Nuri, ZQ-2

Launch history
- Status: Active
- Total launches: 1
- Success(es): 1
- First flight: 1 September 2026

First stage
- Diameter: 3.35 m (11.0 ft)
- Powered by: 7 Welkin
- Maximum thrust: 3,500 kN (790,000 lb_{f})
- Burn time: 151 seconds
- Propellant: RP-1/LOX

Second stage
- Diameter: 3.35 m (11.0 ft)
- Powered by: 1 Welkin Vac
- Maximum thrust: 600 kN (130,000 lb_{f})
- Burn time: 186 seconds
- Propellant: RP-1/LOX

Third stage
- Diameter: 3.35 m (11.0 ft)

The Pallas-1 (Chinese: 智神星一号; pinyin: Zhìshénxīng Yī-hào; lit. 'Zhishenxing-1') is a medium-lift orbital launch vehicle under development by Galactic Energy. It features seven Welkin engines burning RP-1 and liquid oxygen (kerolox) in its first stage. The first stage will have legs and grid fins to allow for stage recovery by vertical landing (much like the SpaceX Falcon 9).

Pallas-1 is a two-stage rocket standing 52 metres (171 ft) and weighing 283-tonne, planned to be capable of placing a 7-tonne payload into low Earth orbit (LEO), or a 3-tonne payload into a 700-kilometer Sun-synchronous orbit (SSO). The first launch of the rocket successfully took place on 1 September 2026. Using three Pallas-1 booster cores as its first stage, Pallas-1B (Chinese: 智神星一号乙) will be capable of putting a 17.5-tonne payload into low Earth orbit.

== First flight ==
The Pallas-1 launch vehicle made a successful debut flight at 02:00 on 1 September 2026 from the Jiuquan Satellite Launch Center. Galactic Energy said the flight went to plan and entered its designated orbit. The launch was the first use of the company's own launch facility dedicated to its Pallas-series liquid rockets. It marked an important step in Galactic Energy's strategy of developing solid- and liquid-propellant launch vehicles in parallel.

== Propulsion ==
The first stage is powered by seven CQ-50 reusable liquid oxygen-kerosene engines developed by Galactic Energy, a configuration that provides propulsion redundancy and meets the requirements for future first-stage recovery. The first stage did not attempt a landing on the debut flight. Galactic Energy is taking a phased approach, rather than attempting orbital insertion and booster recovery at the same time. The company calls Pallas-1 one of its core vehicles for large-scale low Earth orbit satellite constellations and for launching relatively large spacecraft. It wants to make the Pallas series a high-efficiency, lower-cost launch service for commercial satellite operators as constellation deployment accelerates.

== Launches ==
Serial No.	Rocket & serial	Date (UTC)	Launch site	Payload	Orbit	Outcome	Booster Recovery
1	Pallas-1	1 September 2026; 02:00	Jiuquan	Boilerplate (Demo flight)	LEO	Success	No attempt
1	First test flight of Pallas-1						
