= Lingyun =

Lingyun may refer to:

- Lingyun County in China
- Lingyun (rocket engine)
