= Welkin =

Welkin may refer to:

- Welkin, a term for the communion of saints in Christianity
- Galactic Energy Welkin, a rocket engine
- Westland Welkin, a British World War 2 high-altitude fighter aircraft
- Ricardo Welkin, a Re:Zero character
- Welkin Gunther, a character in Valkyria Chronicles
