= TQ-12 =

Rocket engine

- Country of origin: China
- Manufacturer: LandSpace
- Status: Active

Liquid-fuel engine
- Propellant: LOX / CH_{4}
- Mixture ratio: 2.92
- Cycle: Gas-generator cycle

Configuration
- Nozzle ratio: 45

Performance
- Thrust, vacuum: 745 kilonewtons (167,000 lbf) for sea level nozzle 785 kilonewtons (176,000 lbf) for vacuum nozzle
- Thrust, sea-level: 658 kilonewtons (148,000 lbf)
- Chamber pressure: 10.1 MPa (1,460 psi)
- Specific impulse, vacuum: 337 s
- Specific impulse, sea-level: 284.5 s

Dimensions
- Measurement: 3.9 m
- Diameter: 1.5 m

Used in
- ZQ-2 (TQ-12); Zhuque-2E (TQ-12/TQ-12A); ZQ-3 (TQ-12B)

The TQ-12 (Chinese: 天鹊-12; pinyin: Tiānquè-12, lit. Sky Lark 12) is a gas-generator cycle rocket engine burning liquid methane and liquid oxygen (methalox) developed by LandSpace. TQ-12 is the first Chinese liquid rocket engine developed with private funding. The engine has been designed to produce 670 kilonewtons (150,000 lbf) of thrust at sea level.

A TQ-12 engine during a hot firing test on 14 May 2020

Five of the TQ-12 engines were used on each of the three Zhuque-2 launches.

== History ==
The engine passed its first powerpack test including the turbopump, valves, ignition components, and the gas generator at a LandSpace facility in Huzhou on March 25, 2019.

The engine's first full assembly was delivered in May 2019, and a hot fire test was successfully conducted the same month. The engine passed its first 200 second duration variable thrust test on October 26, 2019. A series of 400s hot fire tests were conducted in January 2021 and the first-stage engine assembly for LandSpace's Zhuque-2 rocket was completed in February 2021. The Zhuque-2 launch vehicle first stage has four TQ-12 engines providing a takeoff thrust of 268 tons. The 2nd stage has a single TQ-12 engine.

37 TQ-12 family engines had been built by LandSpace as of July 2022, with cumulative hot fire test duration of more than 20,000 seconds. A record-breaking 3357 seconds of hot fire time were accumulated by one engine over 11 firings.

In August 2022, LandSpace successfully tested an improved TQ-12A. Compared with the original TQ-12, the engine thrust is increased by 9%, the specific impulse is increased by 40 m/s, and the weight is reduced by 100kg.

=== Flight history ===
On December 14, 2022, Zhuque-2 completed its maiden flight. Four TQ-12 engines powered the first stage, which performed normally during the flight. However, the TQ-11 vernier engines used in the second stage failed, and the rocket was lost.

In July 2023, the 2nd launch of Zhuque-2 was successful and the payload reached orbit.

In December 2023, the 3rd and final launch of Zhuque-2 was successful.

The upgraded Zhuque-2E first flew on 27 November 2024, retaining four TQ-12 engines on the first stage and using a single TQ-15A on the second stage.

== Variants ==
The baseline TQ-12 powered the original Zhuque-2. For the Zhuque-2E Y5 flight on 14 May 2026, LandSpace specified four TQ-12A first-stage engines, each producing 828 kN (186,000 lbf) of sea-level thrust.

The TQ-12B is the first-stage variant listed for Zhuque-3, which uses nine engines; the second stage uses a TQ-15B vacuum engine.
