= M10 (rocket engine) =

Liquid fueled rocket engine

MR10
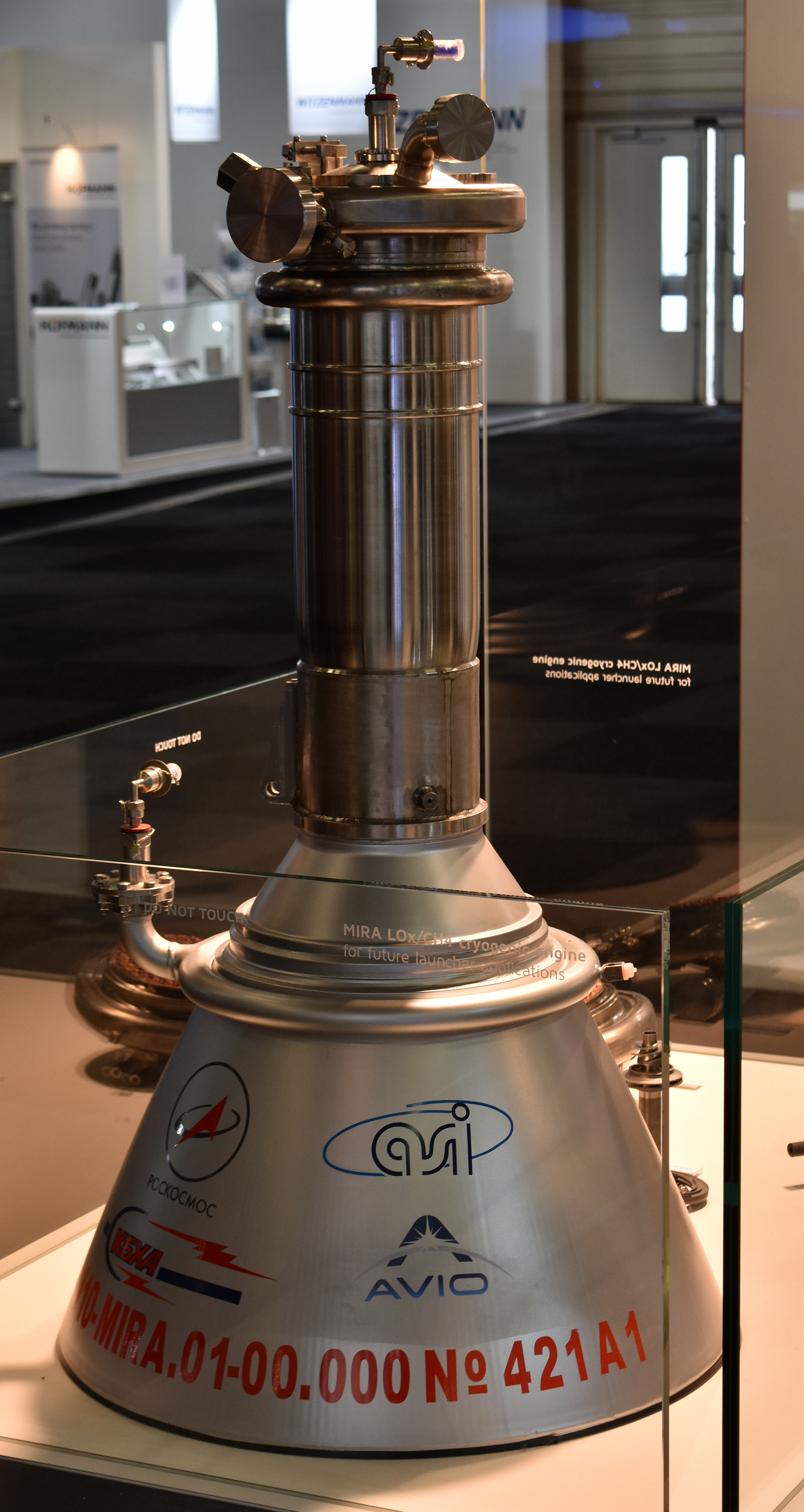
- LM-10 MIRA model at Le Bourget
- Country of origin: Italy
- Designer: Avio, KBKhA
- Manufacturer: Avio
- Application: Upper stage
- Associated LV: Vega E
- Predecessor: RD-0146
- Status: Under development

Liquid-fuel engine
- Propellant: LOX / CH_{4}
- Mixture ratio: 3.4
- Cycle: Expander, closed
- Pumps: 2

Configuration
- Chamber: 1
- Nozzle ratio: 40

Performance
- Thrust: 98 kN (22,000 lb_{f})
- Specific impulse: 362 s (3.55 km/s)
- Restarts: 7
- Gimbal range: ±10°

Dimensions
- Length: 2.4 m (7 ft 10 in)
- Diameter: 1.2 m (3 ft 11 in)
- Dry mass: 250 kg (550 lb)

Used in
- FD1, Vega-E

MR10 (previously known as M10 and LM10-MIRA) is a liquid-fuel, upper-stage rocket engine in development by Avio on behalf of European Space Agency for use on Vega E. The engine is a derivative of the Russian RD-0146 engine and result of a past collaboration between Avio and Chemical Automatics Design Bureau (KBKhA) ended in 2014 after the start of the Russo-Ukrainian War and consequent economic sanctions. On May 6, 2022 engine testing campaign started at Salto di Quirra, Sardinia, with consequent maiden flight on a Vega E launcher expected by 2026 from Guiana Space Centre. The designation "M10" reflects key characteristics of the motor: "M" stands for "methane", referencing its liquid methane fuel; and "10" denoting the original target of 10 tonnes of thrust. The engine was renamed the MR10 in September 2024 in honour of the late Mikhail Rudnykh, who had served as Avio's head of cryogenic propulsion systems and led the engine's development.

== Overview ==
The MR10 engine is the first operational European methane rocket engine, conceived for use on upper stages of future Vega-E and Vega-E Light launchers, in which will replace both the solid-fueled Zefiro 3rd stage and hydrazine-fueled AVUM 4th upper stage. An industrial team directed by Avio with companies of Austria, Belgium, France, Czech Republic, Romania and Switzerland will manufacture the engine. The MR10 minimum thrust requirements are a thrust of 98 kN (22,000 lbf) with a propellant mixture ratio of 3.4 and a minimum specific impulse of 362s.

== Development ==
A feasibility study on improving Vega began in 2004, when the rocket was still in development, with the aim of increase performance, reduce costs and move away from toxic hydrazine fuels. The study proposed a new three-stage version of the rocket named Lyra with a liquid oxygen-methane upper stage. In 2007 Avio and KBKhA started the collaboration for the development of such an engine under an agreement signed between Italian and Russian governments in Moscow on November 28, 2000. The first phase of the collaboration, ended in 2008, aimed at designing a concept for a 10t thrust LOx-LNG engine. The second phase of the collaboration focused instead on designing, manufacturing and testing a 7.5t thrust LM10-MIRA demonstrator engine. The engine was successfully tested in June 2014 in Voronezh, Russia.

After the end of the collaboration with KBKhA, Avio continued the development of MR10 under the Vega-Evolution program returning to the original target thrust of 10t. Objectives were finalizing development of main subsystems such as turbopumps, valves, igniter, thrust vectoring and a new ALM 3D printed Thrust Chamber Assembly (TCA). A subscale model of the TCA was tested successfully on 13 November 2018 in Colleferro, Italy.

In February 2020 a full scale engine prototype with a 3D printed TCA was successfully tested at NASA Marshall Space Flight Center, firing 19 times for a total of 450 seconds.

On May 6 2022, the engine test and qualification campaign started in Avio's new Space Propulsion Test Facility (SPTF) at the Salto di Quirra with a single firing of 20 seconds. The first series of testing concluded successfully in July 2022 with a total ignition time of more than 800 seconds.

Avio plans to test the engine on a suborbital flight of the FD1 demonstrator rocket no earlier than 2027.

== See also ==
- Attitude Vernier Upper Module (AVUM)
- Prometheus (rocket engine)
- Liquid rocket
- Vega (rocket)
- RD-0146

=== Comparable engines ===
- Aeon 1
- TQ-11
