= Jiuzhou Yunjian =

Chinese rocket engine design and production company

JiuZhou Yunjian (Beijing) Space Technology Co., Ltd.
- Native name: 九州云箭（北京）空间科技有限公司
- Type: Private
- Industry: Aerospace
- Founded: 2017; 9 years ago
- Headquarters: Beijing, China
- Website: jzyjspace.com

Jiuzhou Yunjian (Chinese: 九州云箭; lit. 'China Cloud Arrow'), also known as JZYJ, is a Chinese rocket engine design and production startup based in Beijing.

Founded in 2017, the company specializes in methalox liquid rocket engines. Jiuzhou Yunjian aims to support the commercial space sector in China by providing engine technologies for a variety of commercial space launch vehicles.

== History ==
Jiuzhou Yunjian was established in 2017. In 2018, the company successfully tested the gas-generator, ignitor, and valves for its Lingyun engine. According to Chinese media and venture capital firms backing the company, Jiuzhou Yunjian aims to become China's equivalent of Aerojet Rocketdyne, a prominent American aerospace and defense company known for its rocket propulsion systems.

In 2019, launch startup Linkspace signed a contract with Jiuzhou Yunjian to supply engines for their hopper test vehicles.

Throughout 2021, the company conducted numerous hot fire tests of its Lingyun and Longyun engines. The same year, Jiuzhou Yunjian also signed a contract to provide engines for Rocket Pi's Darwin-1 reusable launch vehicle. Additionally, Jiuzhou Yunjian raised more than 100 million RMB in a Series A funding round in 2021.

In March 2024, Jiuzhou Yunjian delivered Longyun engines to a customer in flight-ready configuration for 10 km and 100 km hop tests.

== Products ==
The company's notable products include the 10 tf (22,000 lbf) Lingyun and 70 tf (150,000 lbf) Longyun engines, which have been developed to enable deep throttling capabilities, multiple restarts, and long-duration firings essential for reusable launch vehicles. In particular, the Lingyun engine is designed to power the first stage of launch vehicles, while the Longyun is used on the second stage.

=== Partnerships ===
Jiuzhou Yunjian has partnered with multiple Chinese commercial launch providers to supply engines for their launch vehicles. In 2019, the company signed a contract with Linkspace to supply its Lingyun engine.

In 2021, the company announced a collaboration with Rocket Pi to provide propulsion systems for the Darwin-1 reusable launch vehicle.

In 2022, the state-owned space contractor Shanghai Academy of Spaceflight Technology (SAST) reportedly considered developing reusable launch vehicles with Jiuzhou Yunjian's engines, as evidenced by a paper published by SAST.

Jiuzhou Yunjian partnered with Space Epoch to supply engines for a stainless-steel rocket in 2023. Space Epoch has conducted tests on a stainless-steel propellant tank, which will be integrated with Jiuzhou Yunjian's Longyun-70 engine.
