= ALICE (propellant) =

Nano-aluminum powder rocket propellant

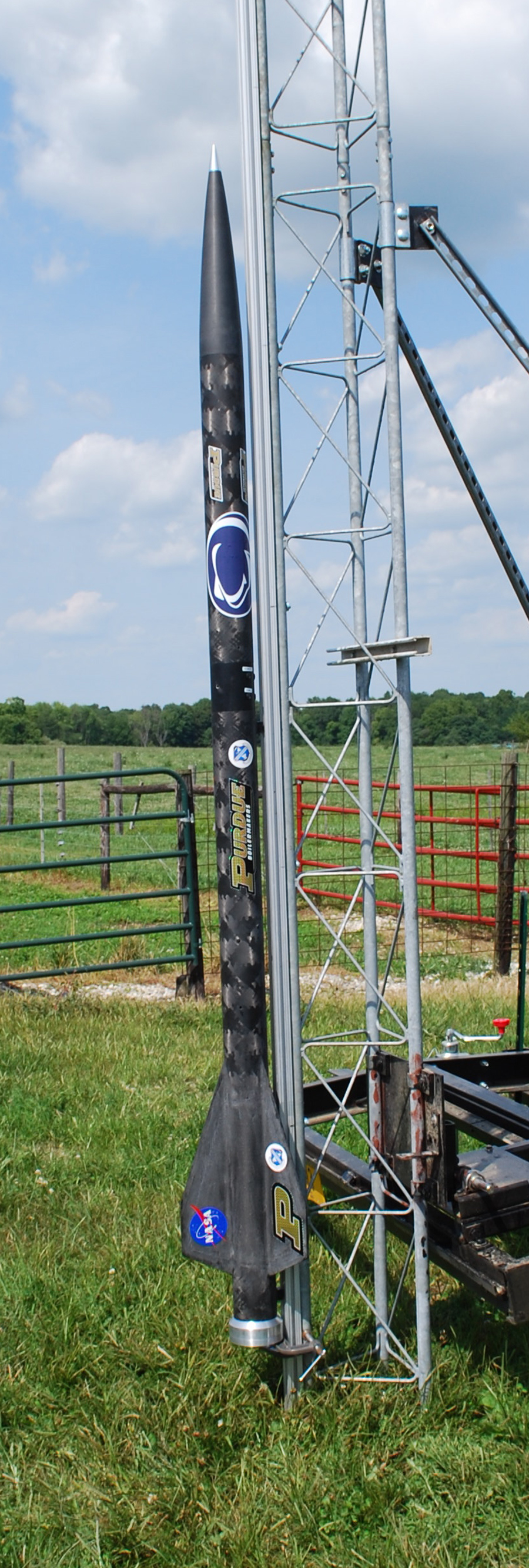
The first-ever rocket powered with ALICE (NASA, August 2009)

Aluminum-Ice Rocket Propellant, or ALICE, is a rocket propellant that consists of a frozen mixture of nano-aluminum powder and water (i.e. aluminum and ice).

Aluminum has a stronger affinity for oxygen than most elements, which is most visible in aluminothermic reactions such as thermite. This allows aluminum to burn with a large release of heat in substances that one normally considers to be inert, such as carbon dioxide and water. However, aluminum combustion is normally hindered by the presence of a durable oxide layer that forms on the surface of aluminum particles, requiring significant heat to overcome. Additionally, aluminum oxide condenses out of the exhaust stream at high temperature, leaving it (and its heat of condensation) unable to contribute to expansion without another gas present to function as a working fluid. This generally has relegated aluminum's role in rocketry to that of being an additive to solid rocket propellants, increasing their density and combustion temperature, and stabilizing the burn.

The oxide layer in nano-aluminum powder, however, is thinner and easier to overcome than in that of larger particles, making the combustion of aluminum with water ice easier to ignite and sustain. Furthermore, as the aluminum consumes the oxygen, it liberates hydrogen which functions as a low-molecular-mass working fluid to translate the heat of combustion (and subsequently condensation) into expansion and thrust. The high density of the mixture allows for reduced tankage mass and high thrust.

The base combustion reaction is:

2 Al + 3 H_{2}O → Al_{2}O_{3} + 3 H_{2}.

ALICE has been proposed as a propellant well-suited for on-site production on outer space bodies such as the Moon, as both aluminum oxide (a source of aluminum) and water are abundant resources in the universe, while the high propellant density decreases the dry mass of the rocket. Maintaining the propellant in a frozen state is relatively simple on most bodies in the Solar System, while other high-performance propellants often involve cryogenic fluids that can pose long-term storage problems. One production method is to combine the powder with ice using resonant acoustic mixing, providing a consistent and homogenous result.

== See also ==
- Nano-thermite
