= YF-209 =

Chinese liquid-fuel rocket engine

- Country of origin: China
- Designer: Academy of Aerospace Liquid Propulsion Technology
- Status: Active

Liquid-fuel engine
- Propellant: LOX / CH_{4}
- Cycle: Gas-generator cycle

Configuration
- Chamber: 1

Performance
- Thrust, vacuum: 825.3 kilonewtons (185,500 lb_{f})
- Thrust, sea-level: 735 kilonewtons (165,000 lb_{f})
- Specific impulse, vacuum: 329 seconds (3.23 km/s)
- Specific impulse, sea-level: 293 seconds (2.87 km/s)

Used in
- Long March 12A (YF-209V)

The YF-209 is a liquid cryogenic rocket engine burning liquid methane and liquid oxygen in a gas-generator cycle. The engine is designed for reusability and commercial use.

== History ==
The YF-209 is designed for the commercial launch market in China with reusability in mind. Its published design targets include at least 30 uses, at least three starts per mission, and deep throttling. The engine hot fire test was successfully completed in February 2023. Development has been prioritised in 2024 to meet the growing needs of the commercial launch market.

In November 2024, reporting from the Zhuhai Airshow stated that the YF-209 had completed development and reliability verification and was ready for delivery for flight.

=== YF-209V ===
The vacuum variant, YF-209V, powered the second stage of Long March 12A on its maiden flight on 23 December 2025. The second stage reached orbit, while the first stage, powered by seven Longyun engines, was not successfully recovered.
