= Long March 10B =

Chinese commercial medium-lift rocket

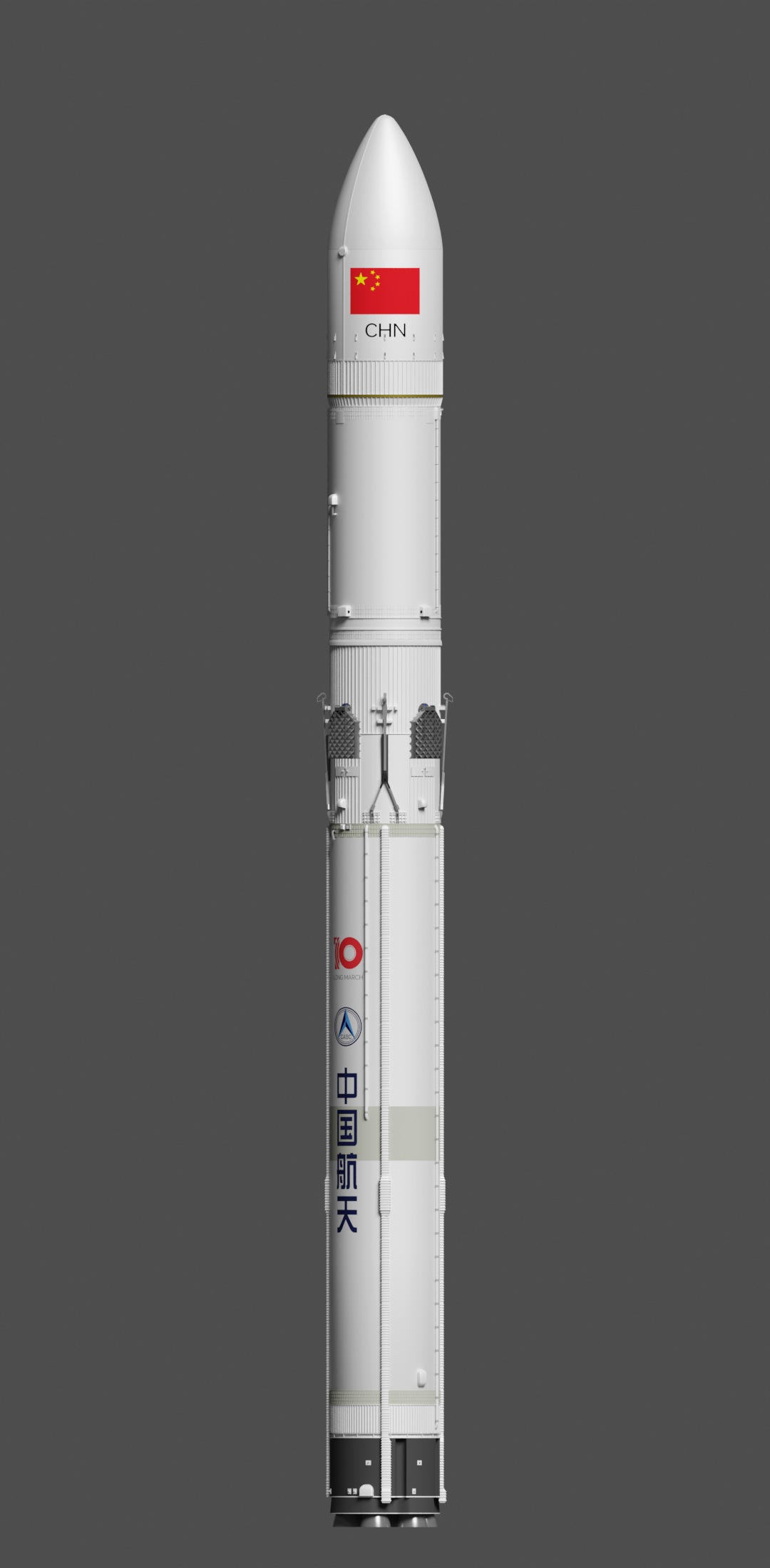
- Function: Medium-lift launch vehicle
- Manufacturer: China Academy of Launch Vehicle Technology (CALT) of the China Aerospace Science and Technology Corporation (CASC)
- Country of origin: People's Republic of China

Size
- Height: 70.2 m (230 ft)
- Diameter: 5 m (16 ft 5 in)
- Stages: 2

Capacity

Payload to LEO
- Altitude: 200 km (120 mi)
- Mass: 16,000 kg (35,000 lb) with booster recovery

Payload to LEO
- Altitude: 900 km (560 mi)
- Mass: 11,000 kg (24,000 lb) with booster recovery

Associated rockets
- Family: Long March
- Based on: Long March 10
- Comparable: Long March 7; Neutron; Zhuque-3; Falcon 9

Launch history
- Status: Active
- Launch sites: Wenchang Commercial
- Total launches: 1
- Success(es): 1
- First flight: 10 July 2026

First stage
- Powered by: 7 × YF-100K
- Maximum thrust: SL: 8,750 kN (1,970,000 lb_{f}) vac: 9,772 kN (2,197,000 lb_{f})
- Specific impulse: SL: 301.6 s (2.958 km/s) vac: 337 s (3.30 km/s)
- Burn time: 155 seconds
- Propellant: RP-1 / LOX

Second stage
- Powered by: 1 × YF-219
- Propellant: CH_{4} / LOX

Long March 10B (LM-10B, Chinese: 长征十号乙; pinyin: Chángzhēng shí hào yǐ, CZ-10B) is a partially reusable two-stage medium-lift launch vehicle developed by China Rocket, the commercial launch subsidiary of China Academy of Launch Vehicle Technology (CALT). It is the third in the Long March 10 series of rockets and is derived using technologies developed for the Long March 10A.

Similar to the heavy-lift Long March 5, the CZ-10B stages have a five-meter diameter. Like other CZ-10 variants, the kerolox first stage is powered by seven YF-100K engines. The second stage uses one YF-219 methalox engine. Like other 21st century Long March designs, the CZ-10B launches from China's southernmost Wenchang Space Launch Site.

The CZ-10B's maiden flight in July 2026 successfully achieved orbit and booster recovery, using a net-based catching system on a floating landing platform in the South China Sea. This marked the first orbital booster recovery by the Chinese space program, the second country to achieve this after the United States, and the first recovery of any rocket using a net-based system.

== Overview ==
The Long March 10B is closely related to the Long March 10 family (from which the Long March 10B is derived), which is designed to fly the Mengzhou spacecraft to the moon.

In December 2025, a representative from China Rocket, the commercial arm of CALT, presented plans for a commercial variant of the Long March 10A during the Wenchang International Aviation and Aerospace Forum 2025. This new variant, the Long March 10B, will have a payload capacity of at least 16 tonnes, likely in a reusable mode, to a 200 km low Earth orbit, and at least 11 tonnes to a 900 km orbit at 50 degrees orbital inclination.

In a July 2026 interview, Qian Hang, from the First Academy of the China Aerospace Science and Technology Corporation (CASC), referred to the Long March 10B as the "younger sibling' of the Long March 10A. Long March 10A is designed to carry crewed spacecraft to low Earth orbit (LEO) and is a comprehensively upgraded evolution of the older Long March 2F and Long March 7 launchers. Thus, the Long March 10B is configured to gather flight data for the Long March 10A, thereby reducing development risks and enhancing the reliability of future crewed missions. In addition, the 10B variant will verify new technologies for the recovery. The Long March 10B will also reuse recovered first-stage boosters from Long March 10A missions and, by using a more powerful liquid methane-based second stage, generate greater lifting capacity than the latter. Unlike the Long March 10A, the 10B variant will be aimed at providing launch services for China's commercial space sector.

== Design ==
The Long March 10B is a medium-lift launch vehicle at 10 m (33 ft) tall and 5 m (16 ft) in diameter. It features two stages, with the first stage powered by seven YF-100K engines. The booster can deliver up to 16 t (35,000 lb) in recoverable configuration to low Earth orbit. It's primarily designed for cargo missions.

The new Long March 10B inherits the first stage of the Long March 10A but reportedly will use a more powerful second stage that employs methane and liquid oxygen as fuel and oxidizer, respectively. There may also be an additional commercial variant tentatively named the Long March 10C. The first stage of the Long March 10B, just as the Long March-10A variant, will be recoverable via a "wire recovery apparatus" located on a recovery vessel after launch from the Wenchang Commercial Space Launch Site on Hainan Island. The first stage of the rocket is equipped with hooks that will catch the wire network on the recovery ship; the tensioned wires are carried by rail-mounted dollies, which automatically position themselves to optimize the likelihood that the rocket will successfully "catch" the wires, akin to a fighter aircraft landing on an aircraft carrier.

Net-based booster recovery differs from landing-leg systems primarily in the location of the recovery hardware. Reusable rockets like Falcon 9 carry the landing legs and reinforced support structures throughout the flight, whereas the Long March 10B places the recovery system and shock-absorbing equipment on the landing barge, leaving the booster with only lightweight hooks to catch arresting wires. This reduces booster mass, simplifies its structure, and increases payload capacity, while the larger capture area of a net could tolerate greater landing error in difficult maritime conditions.

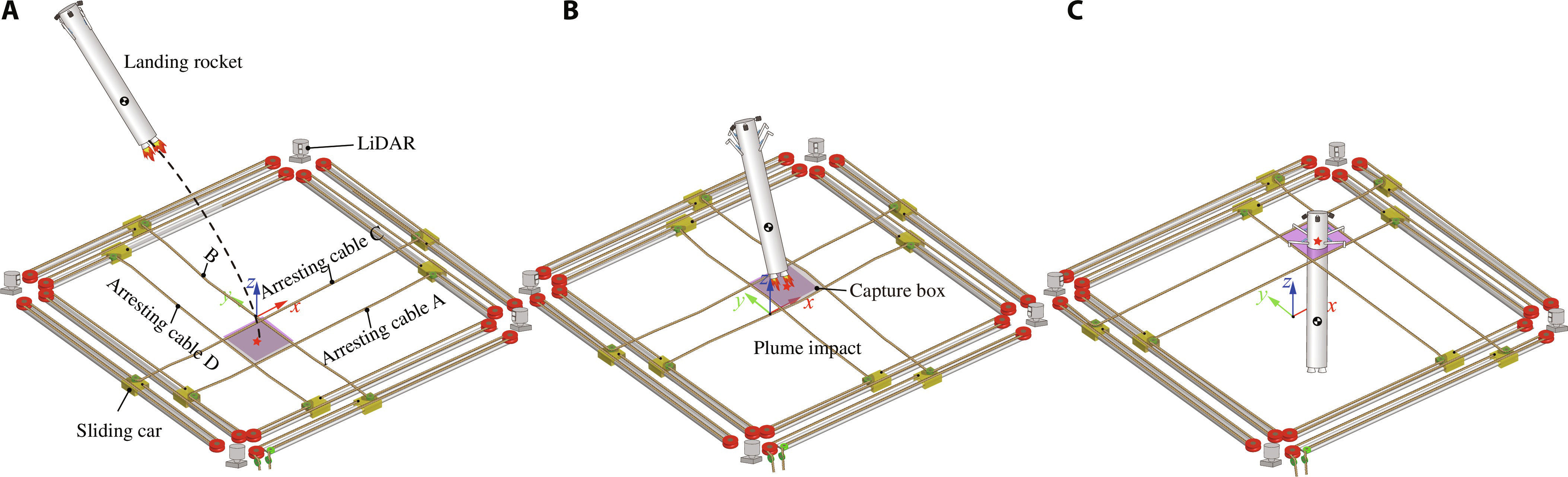
The Long March 10B net recovery system. Illustration of flexible cable-net recovery of a landing rocket.

== Launches ==
=== Debut launch ===
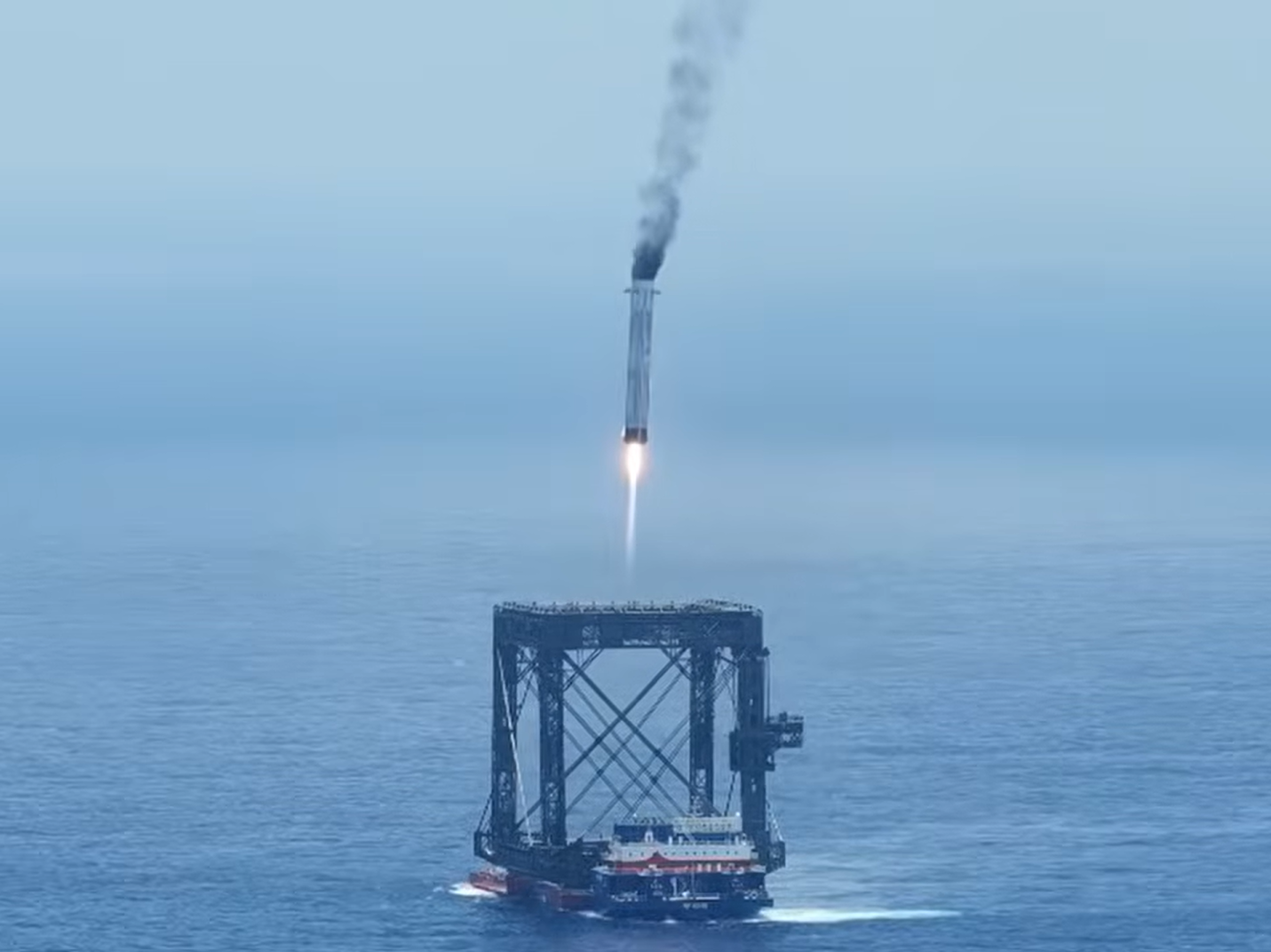
The Long March 10B first stage decelerates into the floating net recovery system on its maiden flight, South China Sea, 10 July 2026.

The first launch of the Long March 10B took place at 4:15 (UTC) on 10 July 2026. The upper stage successfully placed a satellite into its designated orbit. The first-stage booster was successfully recovered using the wire-based recovery system fitted on the Linghangzhe (Navigator) recovery ship. Long March 10B is the first system in China and the fourth launcher system in the world to achieve first-stage recovery during an orbital or sub-orbital launch attempt, after Falcon 9 (2015), Starship (2024), and New Glenn (2025). It is the first system to successfully recover a booster using a net-based system. This was China's third attempt at rocket booster recovery in orbital flights, following LandSpace's Zhuque-3 and SAST's Long March 12A.

=== List of launches ===
Flight No.	Rocket	Stage 1 Serial No.	Date/Time (UTC)	Payload	Orbit	Launch site	Outcome	Booster Recovery
1	CZ-10B	X1B-1	10 July 2026; 04:15	TBA	LEO	WCSLS LC-2	Success	Success
1	Debut orbital flight of CZ-10B, a partially reusable, cargo-optimized variant of the CZ-10 series for launching China's Satellite Internet megaconstellation. First successful recovery of a first-stage booster during an orbital launch attempt by China.							
2	CZ-10B	X1B-2	NET 2026	TBA	LEO	WCSLS LC-2	Planned	Planned
2	The recovered first stage from the first flight is scheduled to be reflown on this mission.							

== See also ==
- China National Space Administration – National space agency of the People's Republic of China
- List of Long March launches (2025-2029)
- Comparison of orbital launchers families
- Comparison of orbital launch systems
- Falcon 9 – Partially-reusable medium-lift launch vehicle by SpaceX
- Long March 10 – Chinese super-heavy carrier rocket
- Space program of China
- Arresting gear – Cable used to rapidly decelerate an aircraft as it lands
