= Lingyun (rocket engine) =

Rocket engine

- Country of origin: China
- Manufacturer: Jiuzhou Yunjian
- Status: Under development

Liquid-fuel engine
- Propellant: LOX / CH_{4}

Performance
- Thrust, vacuum: 116.5 kilonewtons (26,200 lbf)
- Thrust, sea-level: 100 kilonewtons (22,000 lbf)
- Throttle range: 20%–105%
- Specific impulse, vacuum: 355 s (vacuum variant)
- Specific impulse, sea-level: 288s

Dimensions
- Dry mass: 248 kg (547 lb)

The Lingyun (Chinese: 凌云; pinyin: Língyún, lit. Soaring above the clouds) is a gas-generator cycle rocket engine burning liquid methane and liquid oxygen under development by Jiuzhou Yunjian.

== History ==
In 2018, Jiuzhou Yunjian's Lingyun engine successfully passed tests for its gas-generator, ignitor, and valves. In 2021, the Lingyun engine completed multiple starts and deep variable thrust tests.

According to Jiuzhou Yunjian, the LY-10 underwent complete-engine hot-fire testing in 2019. Cumulative hot-fire testing of the Lingyun engine exceeded 10,000 seconds in 2022, and the engine supported a customer hover test in 2023.
