= Long March 12A =

Chinese medium-lift reusable carrier rocket

- Function: Medium-lift launch vehicle
- Manufacturer: Shanghai Academy of Spaceflight Technology
- Country of origin: China

Size
- Height: ~69 m (226 ft 5 in) (w/ 4.2 m fairing)
- Diameter: 3.8 m (12 ft 6 in)
- Mass: 437,000 kg (963,000 lb)
- Stages: 2

Capacity

Payload to LEO
- Altitude: 200 km (120 mi)
- Mass: 9,000 kg (20,000 lb) expended, 6,000 kg (13,000 lb) reusable

Payload to SSO
- Altitude: 500 km (310 mi)
- Mass: ~3,000 kg (6,600 lb)

Associated rockets
- Family: Long March
- Comparable: Long March 8; Long March 12; Falcon 9; Zhuque-3; Neutron; Hyperbola-3; Soyuz-7

Launch history
- Status: Active
- Launch sites: JSLC LM-12 Pad
- Total launches: 1
- Success(es): 1
- First flight: 23 December 2025; 02:00 UTC

First stage
- Powered by: 7 × Longyun-70+
- Maximum thrust: 5,215 kN (1,172,000 lb_{f}) (745 kN each engine)
- Specific impulse: 290+ sec.
- Propellant: LOX / CH_{4}

Second stage
- Powered by: 1 × YF-209V
- Maximum thrust: 940 kN (210,000 lb_{f})
- Propellant: LOX / CH_{4}

The Long March 12A (Chinese: 长征十二号甲运载火箭; pinyin: Chang Zheng 12A, abbreviated LM-12A or CZ-12A) is a Chinese reusable medium-lift launch vehicle carrier rocket. The rocket has two stages and its first stage is designed to be reused after stage-recovery via propulsive landing. Both stages of the rocket will use methane (CH_{4}) and liquid oxygen (LOX) for propulsion. The rocket is manufactured by the Shanghai Academy of Spaceflight Technology (SAST).

The first flight occurred on 23 December 2025 from the Jiuquan Satellite Launch Center with a successful orbital launch, but the first-stage recovery was unsuccessful.

== Rocket characteristics ==
The project that eventually led to the current CZ-12A was initiated in 2021 under the codename "XLV21"; reusability was part of the original goals of the project although the initial design of the future rocket was more ambitious than the current Long March 12A (the future CZ-12B may meet the original project goals).

=== First stage ===
The Long March 12A's first-stage hull is composed of 2219 aluminum alloy, a legacy from the standard Long March 12's first-stage hull. However, unlike the CZ-12, the "A" variant employs CH_{4} and LOX for propulsion, and in a first for the Long March series of rockets, the CZ-12A's first-stage features seven units of the Longyun-70 reusable rocket engine, developed by the private company Jiuzhou Yunjian; the engines provide the rocket with a total of about 5,215 kilonewtons (1,172,000 lb_{f}) of thrust at liftoff. The first stage mounts four "T-tail" fins near the bottom to provide for flight stability and also includes four aluminum alloy landing legs each with a length of approximately 5.7 metres (19 ft).

=== Inter-stage ===
The rocket inter-stage includes four segmented 3D-printed fins and four single-drag element automatic control systems.

=== Second stage ===
The second stage of the rocket features a single unit of the YF-209V reusable methane/LOX engine. The stage's hull is built using 2195 aluminum alloy. The stage also features two automatic flight control units.

=== Rocket fairing ===
There are two possible fairing types for payload enclosure: one type with a diameter of 4.2 metres (14 ft) and a second type with a diameter of 5.2 metres (17 ft).

=== Overall characteristics ===
At liftoff, the rocket has a mass of about 437 tonnes and a liftoff thrust of approximately 5,215 kN; its height is about 69–70 metres (226–230 ft). When the first stage is set on a return-landing trajectory, the CZ-12A's low Earth orbit payload capacity is no less than 6 tonnes; its 500-kilometre (310 mi) sun-synchronous orbit payload capacity is no less than 3 tonnes. The rocket's LEO payload capacity is no less than 9 tonnes when the first-stage is used in an expendable mode.

=== Possible future developments ===
The current configuration of the rocket may be improved in the future. Improvements may include increasing the thrust of each Longyun engine to about 85 tonnes, and adding two additional units of these improved engines to the first stage (for a total of nine), thereby increasing the total liftoff thrust of the rocket by about 45 percent. In addition, there is also the more capable Long March 12B variant.

== Development history ==
On 23 June 2024, SAST conducted its first vertical takeoff, vertical landing (VTVL) test article for CZ-12A at the Jiuquan Satellite Launch Center, likely the same test pad used for i-Space's VTVL experiments. The test article featured three engines, the center of which would remain on during the entire flight. It also featured landing legs, which successfully deployed for the landing. The test lasted around 5 minutes, reaching a maximum altitude of around 10 km (6.2 mi).

On 19 January 2025, SAST launched a VTVL test-stage to a height of 75 km (47 mi) to simulate the launch and recovery of the first stage of the future CZ-12A. The outcome of the test is unknown.

In August 2025, SAST conducted a static fire test of the upper stage of the CZ-12A at the Haiyang Oriental Spaceport.

=== Maiden flight ===
The first flight of the CZ-12A occurred at 2:00 UTC on 23 December 2025, from a dedicated launch site located at the Jiuquan Satellite Launch Center. The launch successfully reached orbit with what appears to be a mass simulator. However, the rocket's first-stage landing attempt was a failure.

== Launch statistics ==
- Failure
- Partial failure
- Success
- Planned

== List of launches ==
Flight no.	Serial no.	Date/time (UTC)	Launch site	Payload	Orbit	Outcome	Booster recovery
1	Y1	23 December 2025; 02:00	JSLC LM-12A Pad	Apparent mass simulator	LEO	Success	Failure
1	First flight of the reusable CZ-12A variant.						
2	Y2	NET November 2026	JSLC LM-12A Pad	TBD	LEO	Planned	Planned
2	Second attempt at first-stage recovery.						

== See also ==
- Long March 10A/Long March 10B
- Comparison of orbital launcher families
- Comparison of orbital launch systems
- Expendable launch system
- Lists of rockets
