= Galactic Energy Welkin =

Welkin
- Country of origin: China
- Manufacturer: Galactic Energy
- Application: Booster stage engines; Upper stage engine
- Status: Under development

Liquid-fuel engine
- Propellant: LOX / RP-1
- Cycle: Gas-generator cycle

Performance
- Thrust, vacuum: 500 kilonewtons (110,000 lbf)
- Thrust, sea-level: 400 kilonewtons (90,000 lbf)
- Thrust-to-weight ratio: >120
- Chamber pressure: 8.0 MPa (1,160 psi)

Used in
- Pallas-1

Welkin (Chinese: 苍穹; pinyin: Cāngqióng) is a gas-generator cycle rocket engine burning RP-1 and liquid oxygen under development by Galactic Energy. The engine features a pintle type injector, a double suction coaxial split turbine pump, and a gas generator using vortex principle. The engine was built with reusability in mind and can be deep throttled to 20% and re-used up to 50 times.

Galactic Energy's Pallas-1 reusable launcher will be powered by Welkin engines. Seven Welkin engines producing 280 tonnes of thrust will be powering the first stage, while the second stage will be powered by a single vacuum-optimized engine. The engine successfully completed its first full-power test in March 2022.
