= Zhuque-2 =

Orbital launch vehicle by LandSpace

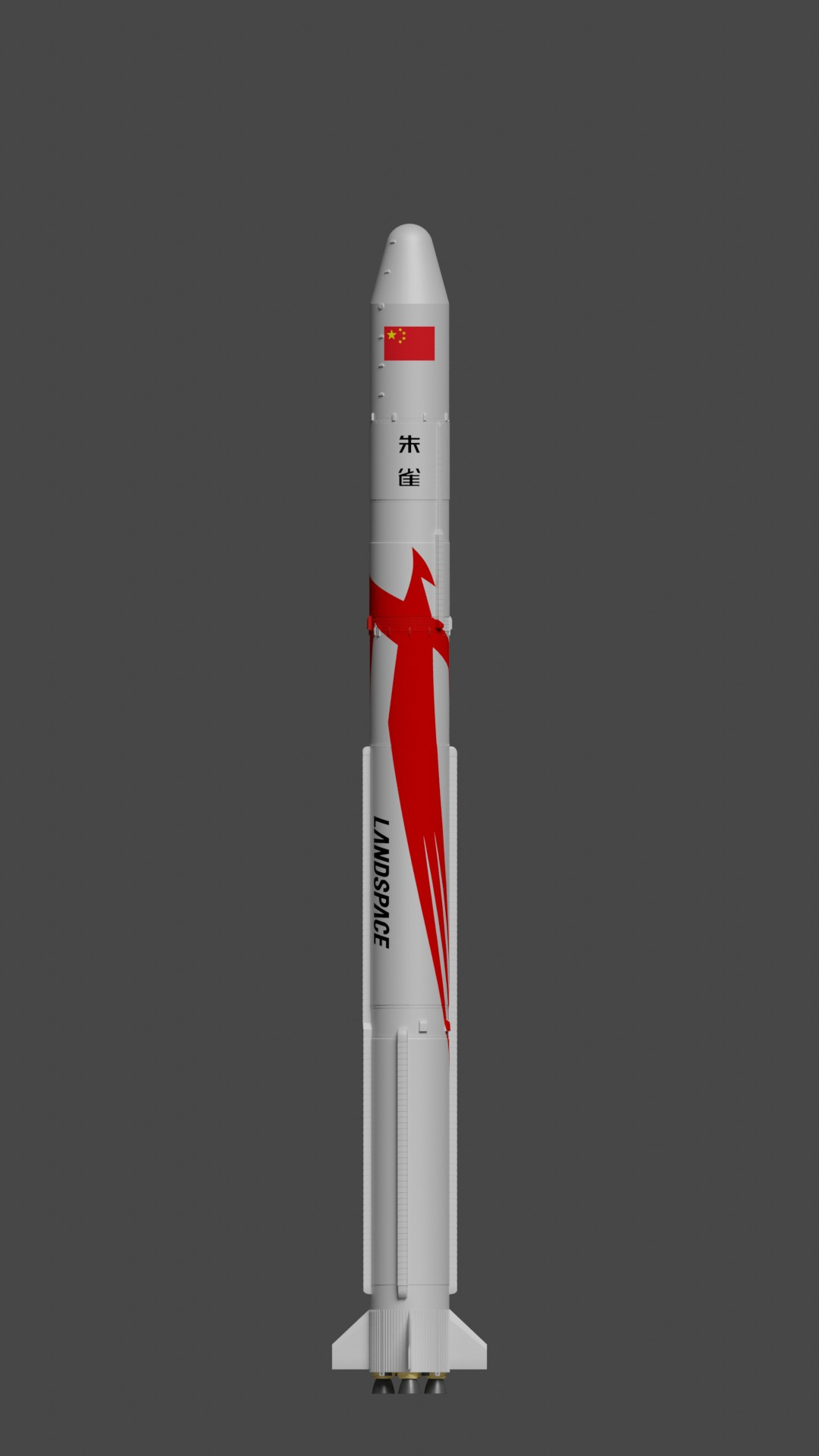
- Rendering of Zhuque-2
- Function: Orbital launch vehicle
- Manufacturer: LandSpace
- Country of origin: China

Size
- Height: Zhuque-2: 49.5 m (162 ft); Zhuque-2E (block 1): 47.8 m (157 ft); Zhuque-2E (block 2): 55.9 m (183 ft)
- Diameter: 3.35 m (11.0 ft)
- Mass: Zhuque-2: 219,000 kg (483,000 lb); Zhuque-2E (block 1): 220,000 kg (490,000 lb); Zhuque-2E (block 2): 267,000 kg (589,000 lb)
- Stages: 2

Capacity

Payload to LEO
- Altitude: 200 km (120 mi)
- Mass: Zhuque-2: 4,000 kg (8,800 lb); Zhuque-2E: 6,000 kg (13,000 lb)

Payload to SSO
- Mass: Zhuque-2: 1,500 kg (3,300 lb); Zhuque-2E: 4,000 kg (8,800 lb)

Launch history
- Status: Zhuque-2: Retired; Zhuque-2E: Active
- Launch sites: Jiuquan Site 96
- Total launches: 10
- Success(es): 8
- Failure: 2
- First flight: 14 December 2022
- Last flight: 14 October 2026, most recent

First stage
- Powered by: Zhuque-2: 4 × TQ-12; Zhuque-2E: 4 × TQ-12A
- Maximum thrust: Zhuque-2: 2,680 kN (273 t_{f}; 600,000 lbf); Zhuque-2E (block 1): 2,880 kN (294 t_{f}; 650,000 lbf); Zhuque-2E (block 2): 3,312 kN (337.7 t_{f}; 745,000 lbf)
- Propellant: LOX / CH_{4}

Second stage
- Powered by: Zhuque-2: 1 × TQ-12 Vac + 1 × TQ-11 (Vernier); Zhuque-2E: 1 × TQ-15A
- Maximum thrust: Zhuque-2: 777.67 kN (79.300 t_{f}; 174,830 lbf); Zhuque-2E: 836 kN (85.2 t_{f}; 188,000 lbf)
- Propellant: LOX / CH_{4}

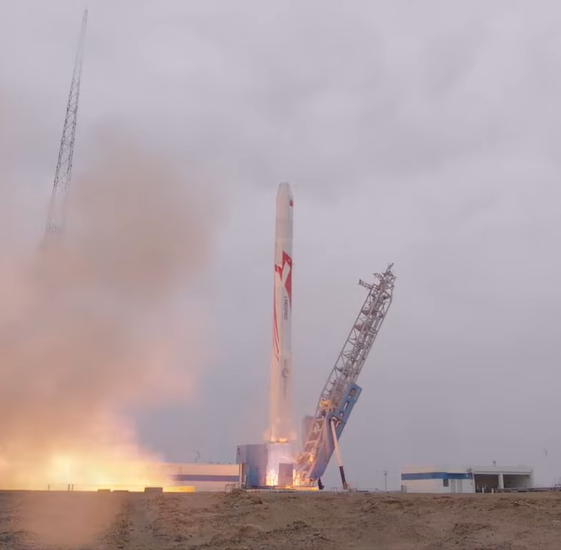
Zhuque-2 Launch

Zhuque-2 (Chinese: 朱雀二号; pinyin: Zhūquè èr hào; lit. 'Zhuque-2', ZQ-2) is a Chinese medium-class orbital launch vehicle developed by LandSpace. It is a liquid-fuelled rocket powered by liquid oxygen and liquid methane (methalox) and was the first methane-fueled rocket to reach orbit.

== Design ==
Zhuque-2 has a liftoff weight of 216 tonnes and uses 4 TQ-12 methalox engines in the first stage, each with a thrust of 67 tonnes-force (660 kN). The second stage uses one vacuum-optimized TQ-12 with a thrust of 80 tonnes-force (780 kN) in combination with a TQ-11 engine (8 tonnes-force (78 kN) thrust), which acts as a vernier thruster.

Zhuque-2 is capable of lifting 6,000 kg of payload into a 200 km low Earth orbit and 4,000 kg of payload into a 500 km Sun-synchronous orbit.

== History ==
In May 2019, LandSpace performed test firings of its liquid-methane and liquid-oxygen fuelled TQ-12 rocket engine at its test facility at Huzhou, Zhejiang province. LandSpace's head of research and development, Ge Minghe, says that the engine has a thrust of 80 tonnes-force. The Huzhou facility will be able to produce about 15 ZQ-2 rockets and 200 TQ-12 engines starting in 2022, according to CEO, Zhang Changwu.

On 14 December 2022, LandSpace conducted the debut flight of Zhuque-2, but failed to reach orbit due to an early shutdown of its second-stage vernier engines after the second-stage main engines apparently completed a successful burn. It was the world's first orbital launch attempt by a methane-fueled launch vehicle.

In March 2023, LandSpace confirmed that the second Zhuque-2 launch vehicle had completed assembly and was undergoing preparations for a launch attempt in the coming months.

On 12 July 2023, Zhuque-2 became the first methane-fueled launch vehicle to reach orbit after a successful second flight.

== Variant ==
=== Zhuque-2E ===
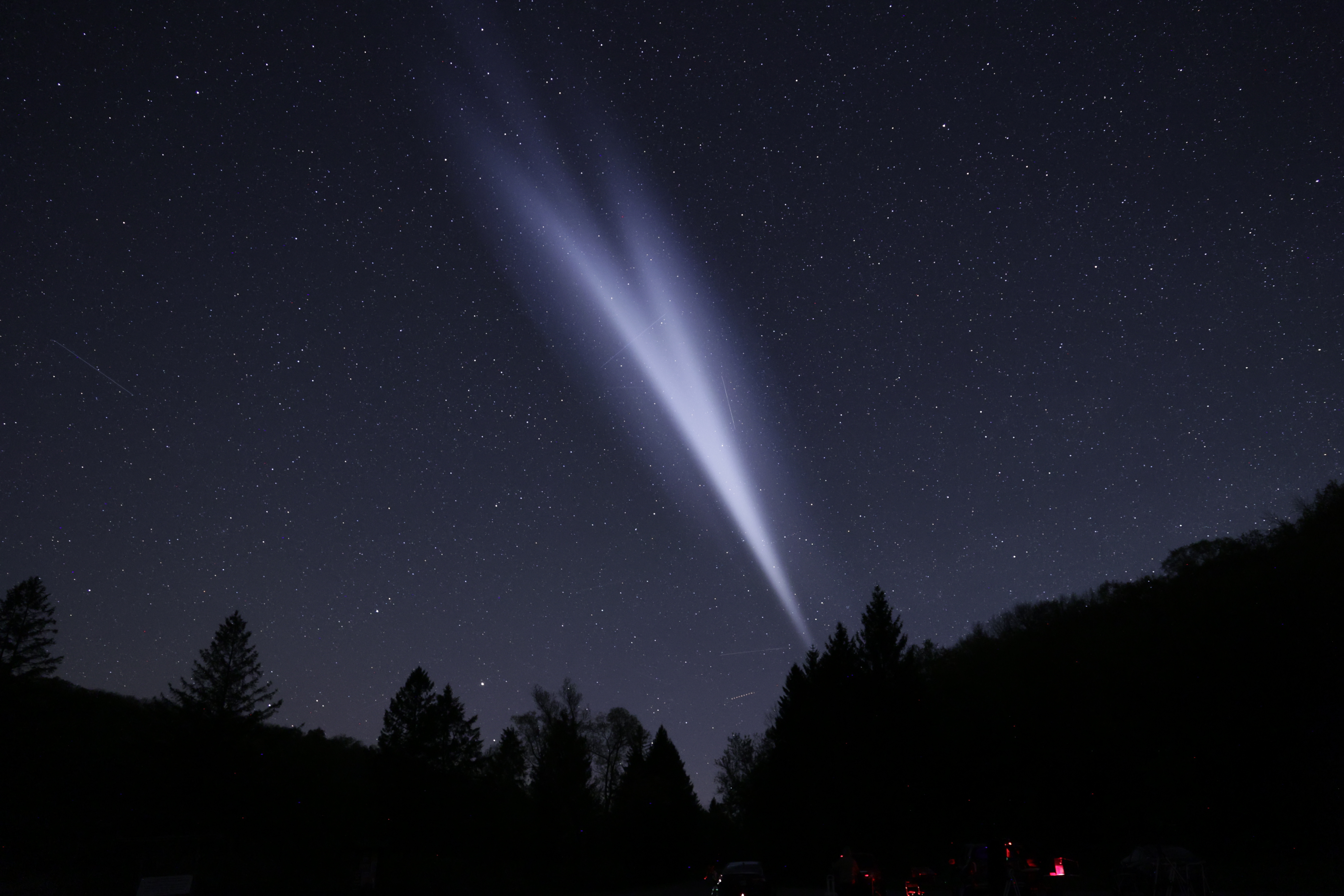
Dumped methalox propellant from the upper stage of Zhuque-2E flight Y5, rendered visible by sunlight

An enhanced version of the rocket, the Zhuque-2E, successfully placed two satellites into orbit on 27 November 2024. The new version of the rocket differs from the initial variant by featuring a common bulkhead tank structure, a new TQ-15 liquid oxygen and methane engine with thrust vectoring capabilities on the second stage, and a new niobium alloy nozzle extension on the enhanced TQ-15A engine.

==== ZQ-2E (Block 2) ====
The Zhuque-2E (Y5), launched on 14 May 2026, is the first of the Block 2 subvariant of the launch vehicle. Various improvements were included on the Block 2 variant which allow the launch vehicle to reach its full designed capabilities such as lifting 6,000 kg (13,000 lb) to Low Earth orbit and 4,000 kg (8,800 lb) to a 500 kilometre SSO orbit. Improvements over the base ZQ-2E include: lengthened first-stage tanks, full subcooled propellant loading, a three-ignition second stage allowing orbital disposal, and an accelerated launch campaign and launch cycle. According to Spacenews.com, the 14 May 2026 article wrote, "...launch successfully inserted a 2,800-kilogram customized payload described as a 'large-scale constellation deployment experiment' into a 900-kilometer polar orbit, ... The mission demonstrated high-mass payload launch capability and readiness for multi-satellite launch services, the company said in a post-launch statement, as it looks to secure launch contracts from China’s megaconstellation projects."

== Launch statistics ==
=== Launch outcomes ===
- Failure
- Partial failure
- Success
- Planned

== Launches ==
Zhuque-2 Y2 launch

Flight No.	Rocket, serial	Date and time (UTC)	Payload	Orbit	Launch site	Outcome
1	Zhuque-2 Y1	14 December 2022; 08:30	Zhixing 1B; Various	SSO	Jiuquan, Site 96	Failure
1	Maiden flight of Zhuque-2. Vernier engines failed during second-stage main-engine shutdown due to excessive forces damaging liquid-oxygen feed line. First launch vehicle using liquid methane propellant to reach space (100 km altitude).					
2	Zhuque-2 Y2	12 July 2023; 01:00	No payload (Flight test)	SSO	Jiuquan, Site 96	Success
2	First launch vehicle using liquid methane propellant to reach orbit.					
3	Zhuque-2 Y3	8 December 2023; 23:39	Honghu-1; Honghu-2; Tianyi 33	SSO	Jiuquan, Site 96	Success
3	First methane launch vehicle to launch payloads into orbit. Last launch of Zhuque-2, Future launches will happen on upgraded Zhuque-2E.					
4	Zhuque-2E Y1	27 November 2024; 02:00	Guangchuan 01; Guangchuan 02	LEO	Jiuquan, Site 96	Success
4	Maiden flight of Zhuque-2E, featuring a second stage without vernier thrusters.					
5	Zhuque-2E Y2	17 May 2025; 04:12	Tianyi-29; Tianyi-34; Tianyi-35; Tianyi-42; Tianyi-45; Tianyi-46	SSO	Jiuquan, Site 96	Success
5	Second flight of Zhuque-2E.					
6	Zhuque-2E Y3	15 August 2025; 01:17	GuangChuan × 4	SSO	Jiuquan, Site 96	Failure
6	Third flight of Zhuque-2E. According to Landspace, a voltage issue in the second stage triggered the activation of the launch vehicle's self-destruct system resulting in the loss of the vehicle and the satellites.					
7	Zhuque-2E Y5	14 May 2026; 03:00	Experimental test mass	SSO	Jiuquan, Site 96	Success
7	Return to flight mission. Fourth flight of Zhuque-2E; first flight of ZQ-2E (Block 2) with lengthened first stage and improved takeoff thrust.					
8	Zhuque-2E Y6	9 June 2026; 08:23	Qianfan DTC 01; China Mobile 02	SSO	Jiuquan, Site 96	Success
8	Second flight of ZQ-2E (Block 2). Upper stage broke apart shortly after separation.					
9	Zhuque-2E Y7	15 September 2026; 06:26	Qianfan Jigui Group 19	SSO	Jiuquan, Site 96	Success
9	10 satellites for the Thousand Sails megaconstallation.					
10	Zhuque-2E Y4	14 October 2026; 11:40	Xingshidai-39,44-50; Guangchuan-03,04	SSO	Jiuquan, Site 96	Success
10	Ten satellites launched on this flight.					

== See also ==
- Comparison of orbital launcher families
- Comparison of orbital launch systems
- Expendable launch system
- Lists of rockets
