= TQ-11 =

Engine for space rocket

- Country of origin: China
- Manufacturer: LandSpace
- Status: Active

Liquid-fuel engine
- Propellant: LOX / CH_{4}
- Mixture ratio: 2.92
- Cycle: Gas-generator cycle

Configuration
- Nozzle ratio: 25.5

Performance
- Thrust, vacuum: 80 kilonewtons (18,000 lbf)
- Chamber pressure: 10.1 MPa (1,460 psi)
- Specific impulse, vacuum: 337s

Dimensions
- Measurement: 1.1m
- Diameter: 0.28m

Used in
- ZQ-2

The TQ-11 (Chinese: 天鹊-11; pinyin: Tiānquè-11, lit. Sky Lark 11) is a gas-generator cycle rocket engine burning liquid methane and liquid oxygen developed by LandSpace. It was used as the second stage vernier engine for LandSpace's ZQ-2 rocket. The engine produces 80 kilonewtons (18,000 lbf) of thrust in a vacuum.

== History ==
LandSpace completed the first engine hot firing test for TQ-11 on November 3, 2019, and the engine passed a 1500 second test in 2020. On December 14, 2022, Zhuque-2 completed its maiden flight. The TQ-11 engines used in the rocket's second stage failed, resulting in mission failure. LandSpace planned to upgrade the second stage with one TQ-15A engine, eliminating the need for a vernier engine. In July 2023, LandSpace successfully launched its second ZQ-2 rocket, continuing to utilize TQ-11 engines for the second stage.

The upgraded Zhuque-2E first flew on 27 November 2024 with a single TQ-15A second-stage engine, replacing the earlier main-engine and vernier arrangement with thrust-vector control.
