= TQ-15 =

Rocket engine

- Country of origin: China
- Manufacturer: Landspace
- Status: Active

Liquid-fuel engine
- Propellant: LOX / CH_{4}

Performance
- Thrust, vacuum: TQ-15A (May 2026): 858 kilonewtons (193,000 lbf)

Used in
- Zhuque-2E (TQ-15A); Zhuque-3 (TQ-15B)

The TQ-15 (Chinese: 天鹊-15; pinyin: Tiānquè-15, lit. Sky Lark 15) is a gas-generator cycle rocket engine burning liquid methane and liquid oxygen developed by Landspace. The TQ-15A variant powers the second stage of LandSpace's upgraded Zhuque-2E rocket.

== History ==
In October 2022, the construction of a fresh batch of ZQ-2 rockets was announced by LandSpace. The planned second-stage upgrade used the TQ-15A in place of the previous main-engine and TQ-11 vernier thruster arrangement, with a thrust vector control system and restart capability. The TQ-15A was then reported to have a thrust of 836 kN (188,000 lbf) and a throttle range of 55–110%.

In March 2024, the first flight-ready TQ-15A was delivered for the assembly of Zhuque-2 Block 2.

On November 27, 2024, an upgraded Zhuque-2E with a TQ-15A engine powering the second stage successfully placed 2 satellites into orbit.

Replacing the vernier thrusters with thrust-vector control reduced the mass of the second-stage propulsion system by 400 kg.

== Variants ==
For the Zhuque-2E Y5 flight on 14 May 2026, LandSpace specified a TQ-15A second-stage engine with 858 kN (193,000 lbf) of vacuum thrust. The mission used a three-ignition second-stage scheme, including a deorbit manoeuvre.

The TQ-15B is the vacuum engine listed for the second stage of Zhuque-3, whose first stage uses nine TQ-12B engines.
