= Longyun (rocket engine) =

Rocket engine

- Country of origin: China
- Manufacturer: Jiuzhou Yunjian
- Status: Active

Liquid-fuel engine
- Propellant: LOX / CH_{4}

Performance
- Thrust, vacuum: 770.2 kilonewtons (173,100 lbf)
- Thrust, sea-level: 686.5 kilonewtons (154,300 lbf)
- Throttle range: 30%~100%
- Specific impulse, vacuum: 350s
- Specific impulse, sea-level: 290s

Dimensions
- Dry mass: 880 kg (1,940 lb)

Used in
- Long March 12A

The Longyun (Chinese: 龙云; pinyin: Lóngyún, lit. Dragon Clouds) is a gas-generator cycle rocket engine burning liquid methane and liquid oxygen developed by Jiuzhou Yunjian.

== History ==
In 2018, the gas generator test for the Longyun engine was completed. The engine completed multiple start-up hot test runs in May 2021. In October 2021, launch startup Rocket Pi signed a deal to use the Longyun engine to power its Darwin-1 reusable launch vehicle.

Space Epoch conducted a ground test of a 4.2-meter stainless steel stage powered by the Longyun engine in January 2023.

In April 2024, Longyun passed a long duration hot firing test with the servo mechanism rotating to the maximum angle of ±8°. The engine has also reportedly passed the customer acceptance test.

On 29 May 2025, engine LY70005 powered a flight and sea-recovery test, including shutdown, restart, a hover above the sea and splashdown. On 4 August 2025, Jiuzhou Yunjian reported that the recovered engine had completed four hot-fire tests with its gimbal control system.

Seven Longyun engines powered the first stage on the maiden flight of Long March 12A on 23 December 2025. The second stage reached its intended orbit, but the first-stage recovery attempt failed.
