= Zhuque-3 =

Partly reusable Orbital launch vehicle by LandSpace of China

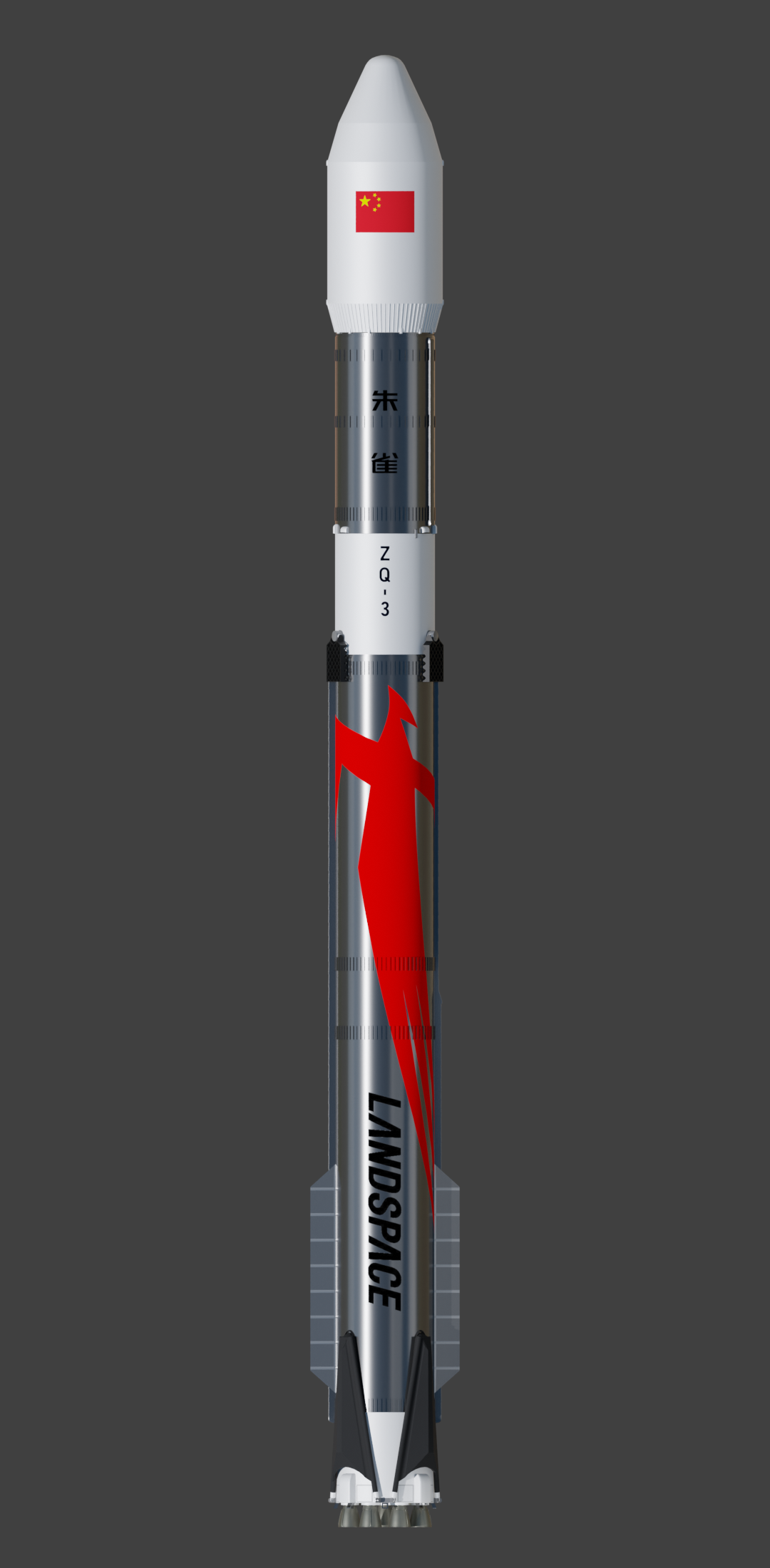
- A rendering of the Zhuque-3
- Function: Orbital launch vehicle
- Manufacturer: LandSpace
- Country of origin: China

Size
- Height: Zhuque-3: 65.9 m (216 ft); Zhuque-3E: 76.2 m (250 ft)
- Diameter: 4.5 m (15 ft)
- Mass: Zhuque-3: 550,000 kg (1,210,000 lb); Zhuque-3E: 654,500 kg (1,442,900 lb)
- Stages: 2

Capacity

Payload to low Earth orbit (LEO) 450 km
- Mass: Zhuque-3: 11,800 kg (26,000 lb) (expended); 8,000 kg (18,000 lb) (recovered; down-range); Zhuque-3E: 21,300 kg (47,000 lb) (expended); 18,300 kg (40,300 lb) (recovered; down-range); 12,500 kg (27,600 lb) (recovered; back to launch point)

Launch history
- Status: Zhuque-3: Active; Zhuque-3E: Under development
- Launch sites: Jiuquan Site 96
- Total launches: 2
- Success(es): 2
- Landings: 1
- First flight: 3 December 2025; 04:00 UTC
- Last flight: 18 August 2026; 23:35 UTC

First stage
- Powered by: Zhuque-3: 9 × TQ-12A; Zhuque-3E: 9 × TQ-12B
- Maximum thrust: Zhuque-3: 7,200 kN (730 t_{f}; 1,600,000 lbf) Sea-Level; Zhuque-3E: 9,000 kN (920 t_{f}; 2,000,000 lbf) Sea-Level
- Propellant: LOX / CH_{4}

Second stage
- Powered by: Zhuque-3: 1 × TQ-15A Vacuum; Zhuque-3E: 1 × TQ-15B Vacuum
- Maximum thrust: Zhuque-3: 944.4 kN (96.30 t_{f}; 212,300 lbf) Vacuum; Zhuque-3E: 1,183 kN (120.6 t_{f}; 266,000 lbf) Vacuum
- Propellant: LOX / CH_{4}

Zhuque-3 (ZQ-3, Chinese: 朱雀三号; trans. "Vermilion Bird 3") is a two-stage, medium-to-heavy, partially reusable launch vehicle made of stainless steel and powered by liquid methane fuel. It is the third in a series of orbital-class launch vehicles developed by LandSpace, a Chinese commercial space launch provider based in Beijing.

The maiden flight of Zhuque-3 occurred on 3 December 2025. LandSpace's attempt to achieve first-stage recovery during the rocket's maiden flight proved to be unsuccessful; recovery was achieved on 18 August 2026, when the booster successfully landed downrange during the rocket's second flight.

== Design ==
Zhuque-3E (ZQ-3E) is the version that is expected to be the workhorse for this family of launch vehicles. ZQ-3E will be equipped with nine Tianque-12B engines, five of which can gimbal while four are fixed; the first stage of the rocket is designed to be recoverable and reusable for up to twenty launches. ZQ-3E's second stage will use a single TQ-15B engine. The rocket will be 76.2 meters in length, 4.5 meters in diameter, and have a liftoff weight of approximately 660 tonnes. Its planned payload capacity to low Earth orbit is about 21 tonnes in expendable mode, 18.3 tonnes when the first stage is recovered downrange, and 12.5 tonnes when the first stage returns to the launch site.

Zhuque-3 (ZQ-3), the initial version of the rocket which was used on the rocket's first flight, is less powerful in performance and specifications than the ZQ-3E. The ZQ-3 is about 66 meters in length with a mass of about 550 tonnes. It uses slightly lower thrust engines on each stage, the TQ-12A and TQ-15A. When landing, 5 engines are relit for the initial landing burn. The vehicle then downselects to three, and seconds later to simply the center engine, which it uses until touchdown.

== Development history ==
On 19 January 2024, Landspace conducted a successful vertical takeoff and vertical landing (VTVL) test using the Zhuque-3 VTVL-1 test vehicle at Jiuquan Satellite Launch Center (JSLC). The test stage, powered by a single Tianque-12 engine, flew for approximately 60 seconds and reached a height of about 350 metres (1,150 ft). Landspace reported a landing accuracy of about 2.4 metres (7.9 ft) and a touchdown speed of approximately 0.75 metres per second (1.7 mph). Additionally, the company had previously announced plans to develop a 200-tonne class full-flow staged combustion engine BF-20, which is expected to be ready by 2028 for a future version of Zhuque-3.

On 11 September 2024, the Zhuque-3 VTVL-1 test stage completed another successful vertical-takeoff-vertical-landing test at its JSLC. The test flight lasted about 200 seconds and achieved a maximum height in excess of 10 kilometres (6.2 mi). The flight also featured a mid-air engine cutoff test at about 113 seconds after liftoff and an engine reignition test about 40 seconds later when the test stage was at a height of about 4,640 metres (15,220 ft); this engine cutoff and reignition sequence during a VTVL attempt represented a first for any Chinese rocket manufacturing entities. During the period when its engine was not in active operation, the test stage employed a cold gas attitude control reaction system in addition to four grid fins to control its gliding descent. The test stage completed its landing sequence at a concrete pad located about 3.2 kilometres (2.0 mi) away from its launch point; the precise landing spot was 1.7 metres (5.6 ft) away from the nominal center of the landing pad.

On 20 June 2025, LandSpace conducted a static fire of a ZhuQue-3 booster test article (not a flight ready booster) at the JSLC. The test was performed on the actual launch pad for ZhuQue-3, similar to how Starship's Super Heavy booster is static fired on the OLM. For this test, the article was filled with propellant, partly to mimic inflight conditions but likely also to prevent an accidental flight. The test article featured nine TQ-12A engines, generating a maximum of 769 tons of thrust during the 45 second static fire. The five engines which can gimbal also performed tests. In an official statement, LandSpace hailed the test as completely successful and instrumental to the success of ZhuQue 3.

From October 18 until October 20, 2025, LandSpace conducted a full-scale propellant-loading rehearsal and first-stage static fire test in preparation for the maiden launch of the Zhuque-3. Next, the company will proceed to conduct vertical-integration rehearsals involving the second-stage and the payload fairing before returning the rocket to relevant test areas for inspection and maintenance.

=== Maiden launch ===
The first launch of the base Zhuque-3 occurred on 03 December 2025 at 04:00 UTC. The payload successfully reached orbit, but the first stage booster experienced an anomaly during the final recovery phase and crashed near the planned landing site. In a video, the booster appeared to catch fire while still in the air as the engine were supposed to ignite. According to the Xinhua News Agency, "an abnormal combustion occurred" during the recovery process thereby preventing a soft landing on the recovery site and resulting in the failure of the recovery test.

On 6 December 2025, LandSpace announced that despite the unsuccessful attempt to recover the first-stage booster on 3 December 2025, the company nevertheless succeeded in verifying the structural thermal protection system, overall aerodynamic layout design, and attitude control capabilities of the first-stage booster during its "supersonic reentry aerodynamic glide phase" ("超音速再入气动滑行阶段"). The December 3rd recovery attempt also allowed the company to verify the first-stage's composite attitude control strategy which involves the use of a cold-gas reaction control system combined with the employment of grid-fins. Finally, the booster landing attempt gave LandSpace sufficient data to verify the precision of the booster's recovery guidance algorithm during both the "reentry ignition phase" ("再入点火段") and the reentry glide phase.

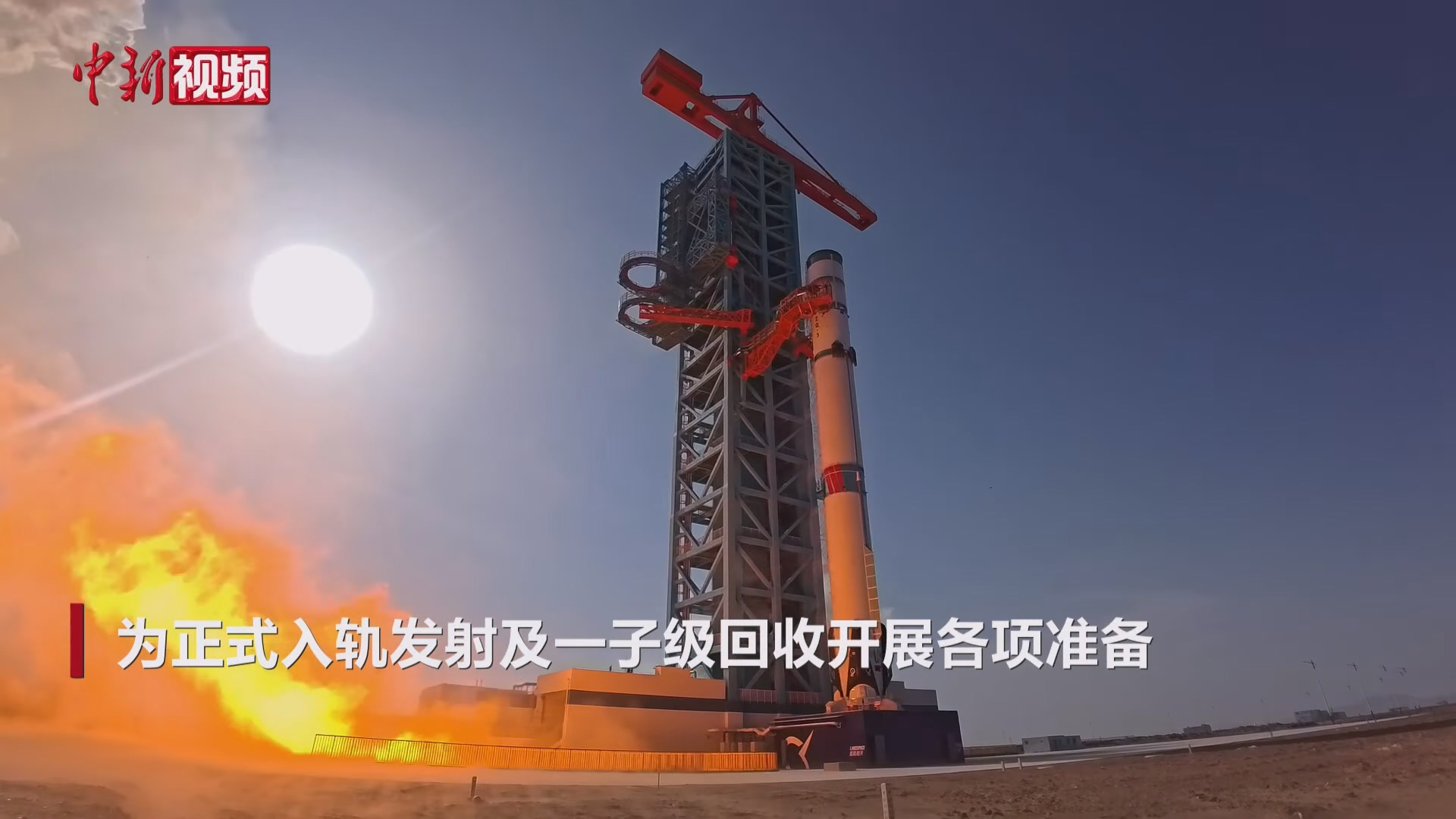
Static firing test of the Zhuque-3 in October 2025 at the Jiuquan Satellite Launch Center in China.

=== First-stage recovery success ===
On 18 August 2026, the ZQ-3 (Y2) rocket launched from the Dongfeng Commercial Space Innovation Test Zone within the Jiuquan Satellite Launch Center at 23:35 UTC. The orbital mission was successful and sent the Honghu-03 satellite into orbit. The rocket's first stage successfully landed approximately 390 kilometres downrange at a landing pad located in Minqin county, Gansu province at 23:43 UTC, a little more than 8 minutes later; with this successful landing, Zhuque-3 became the second Chinese launcher to achieve first-stage recovery during an orbital launch attempt (after the successful 10 July 2026 recovery of the Long March 10B 1st-stage at sea), but the first successful Chinese stage-recovery that was accomplished via landing legs on land.

Technical changes implemented in the Y2 rocket compared to the Y1 rocket (which failed in its December 2025 landing attempt) include: improved landing reliability by reducing the number of engines employed for the 1st-stage's landing burn, adding a "predicted landing point" to the stage's on-board autonomous safety control system, and improved thermal protection on the first-stage structure to better guard against the heat of reentry. A company representative stated that they are targeting a relaunch of the recovered first-stage in the next six months.

== Future plans ==
According to China National Radio, Zhuque-3 is expected to launch the new reusable Haolong cargo spaceplane built by the Chengdu Aircraft Design Institute, an arm of the Aviation Industry Corporation (AVIC); the cargo space shuttle is one of two lower cost resupply vehicles selected by CMSA to provide greater cargo-return capabilities and resupply redundancy for the Tiangong Space Station. The Zhuque-3 is also expected to begin launch missions for China's Guowang broadband communications megaconstellation.

== Launches ==
Flight No.	Rocket	Serial No.	Date/Time (UTC)	Launch site	Payload	Orbit	Outcome	Booster Recovery
1	ZQ-3	Y1	3 December 2025, 04:00	Jiuquan, Site-96	Mass Simulator	LEO	Success	Failure
1	First flight of Zhuque-3. Orbital mission successful; first stage landing anomaly during final landing burn.							
2	ZQ-3	Y2	18 August 2026, 23:35	Jiuquan, Site-96	Honghu-03 (鸿鹄03星)	LEO	Success	Successful landing, Failed recovery 38°26′42″N 103°28′50″E
2	Second successful 1st-stage recovery by a Chinese launch provider during an orbital launch attempt, first successful Chinese 1st-stage landing using landing legs. A fire broke out after landing causing one of the legs to fail and the booster tipped over.							

== See also ==
- BF-20 FFSC engine to be used in Zhuque-3
- LandSpace
- Comparison of orbital launcher families
- Comparison of orbital launch systems
- Reusable launch vehicle
- Expendable launch system
- Lists of rockets

=== Launch systems of comparable class and technology ===
(Reusable methane-fueled medium lift-off systems)

- Long March 12A
- i-Space Hyperbola-3
- Rocket Lab Neutron
- Soyuz-7
