= Rocket Lab Neutron =

Partially-reusable medium-lift launch vehicle

Neutron

- Function: Medium-lift launch vehicle
- Manufacturer: Rocket Lab
- Country of origin: United States
- Cost per launch: $50 million

Size
- Height: 42.8 m
- Diameter: 7 m; 5 m
- Mass: 480,000 kg

Associated rockets
- Comparable: Falcon 9

Launch history
- Status: In development
- Launch sites: MARS, LC-3
- First flight: 2027 (expected)
Payloads
Payload to low Earth orbit
| Mass | 13,000 kg; 15,000 kg |
Payload to Moon
Payload to Venus
| Mass | 1,500 kg |
Payload to Mars
| Mass | 1,500 kg |
 
Stages information
First stage
| Height | 42.8 m |
| Diameter | 7 m |
| Powered by | Archimedes (9) |
| Maximum thrust | 6,600 kN |
Second stage
| Height | 11.5 m |
| Diameter | 4.9 m |
| Powered by | Archimedes Vacuum (1) |
| Maximum thrust | 900 kN |

Neutron is a partially reusable, medium-lift, two-stage launch vehicle under development by Rocket Lab. Announced on March 1, 2021, the vehicle is designed to be capable of delivering a payload of 13,000 kg (28,700 lb) to low Earth orbit in a partially reusable configuration, and will focus on the growing megaconstellation satellite delivery market. First launch is expected in 2027.

== Design ==
Neutron is designed to be partially reusable. The rocket's first stage has a 7 m (23 ft) diameter, 4 landing legs and canards, and 2 fairing halves. To maximize reusability, Rocket Lab uses a "hungry hippo" payload fairing design in which, instead of fairings being detached from the first or second stage as is typical in modern rockets, the fairings are integrated with the first stage via hinges. Neutron has two fairing segments mounted in this way. The first stage is powered by 9 oxygen-rich staged-combustion CH4/LOx ("methalox") Archimedes rocket engines.

The second stage of Neutron is completely contained within the Hungry Hippo fairing. It is hung from the separation plane, in that the tank structure of the stage is in tension when under thrust. Like the first stage, its structure is composed of carbon composite. It is powered by one Archimedes engine.

The first stage is intended to propulsively land on a floating landing platform downrange in the Atlantic Ocean named Return on Investment.

== Design History ==
An earlier design of Neutron (March 2021), included a rocket 40 m (130 ft) tall with a 4.5 m (15 ft)-diameter payload fairing. Rocket Lab stated that they intended for the first stage of the vehicle to be reusable, with landings planned on a floating landing platform downrange in the Atlantic Ocean.

On December 2, 2021, Rocket Lab unveiled a revised design for Neutron, featuring a tapered shape with a maximum diameter of 7 m (23 ft). Rocket Lab abandoned opts for a return-to-launch-site reusability profile and on a floating platform. Instead of a conventional payload fairing that is jettisoned and recovered at sea, the fairing is integrated into the vehicle, and opens during stage separation to release the second stage and payload, and then closes before the first stage lands back on earth. The rocket features a unique interstage design where the second stage is "hung" from the first stage structure.

On September 22, 2022, another revised design was unveiled at an investor day, with the first stage engine count increased from seven to nine, and the engine architecture changed from gas-generator to oxygen rich staged combustion. This was done primarily to allow for a lower turbine temperature, while maintaining the same specific impulse. The engine will run with a significantly lower chamber pressure than other similar engines, at the cost of some performance. The number of fairing segments was reduced from four to two.

On July 27, 2023, new concept art on the Rocket Lab website showed a further revised design, with a reduction in the number of payload fairing sections from 4 to 2, redesigned landing legs, and small changes to the overall shape of the rocket. The number of payload fairing sections was reduced in order to allow for simpler fairing opening mechanisms while the landing legs were redesigned in order to be optimized for landings on floating platforms, allowing for an increase in launch availability. The redesigned legs feature a folding mechanism similar to the SpaceX Falcon 9 landing legs.

During the company's earnings call in February 2025, a plan to modify the offshore barge Oceanus were unveiled. When modifications are complete, the ship will be named Return On Investment. The 120 m (400 ft) ship will be refit by Bollinger Shipyards in Louisiana.

On 14 October, 2026, Rocket Lab founder Sir Peter Beck announced that an issue had been discovered with the manufacturing process for the forward dome of the first stage propellent tank. This involved the formation of small voids in the layers of the dome's carbon composite. In the same announcement, he confirmed that the issue had been resolved and that design improvements had been made, but that associated delays would push Neutron's first launch date to 2027.

== Operations ==
On February 28, 2022, Rocket Lab announced that Neutron will launch from the Mid-Atlantic Regional Spaceport (MARS) within NASA's Wallops Flight Facility on the eastern coast of Virginia. It was also announced that the company will build a 250,000 square feet manufacturing and operations facility adjacent to the Wallops Flight Facility. Ground was broken for this facility on April 11, 2022. As of December 2021, Rocket Lab is planning for the first launch to take place no earlier than July 2025. Test firing of Neutron's Archimedes engine occurred at NASA's Stennis Space Center in Hancock County, Mississippi.

In September 2025, Rocket Lab held a ceremony to mark the launch pad (including deluge system) being ready for launch.

== Development timeline ==
Past and future development milestones for Neutron.

| Date | Milestone | Status |
|---|---|---|
| Q2 2022 | Moulds and tooling for Neutron completed | Completed |
| Q3 2022 | Full-scale prototype hardware for Archimedes and Neutron being made | Completed |
| Nov 4, 2022 | Opening Archimedes test complex at NASA Stennis Space Center | Completed |
| Q4 2022 | Pre-burner hotfire Test of Archimedes engine for the first time | Completed |
| Jan 10, 2023 | Testing engine ignition on development hardware | Completed |
| Q1 2023 | Test stand infrastructure completed for Neutron Stage 2 tank | Completed |
| Aug 8, 2023 | First Stage 2 build | Completed |
| Oct 4, 2023 | Stage two structural and cryogenic testing | Completed |
| May 6, 2024 | First Archimedes development engine built | Completed |
| Aug 8, 2024 | First Archimedes engine hot fire | Completed |
| 2024 | Testing of all avionics and communications devices with critical onboard software and GNC algorithms | Completed |
| NET 2026 | Flight mechanisms test program | In progress |
| NET 2026 | Stage 1 build | In progress |
| NET 2026 | Stage 2 static fire | In progress |
| NET 2026 | Stage 1 static fire | Not started |
| Q3 2025 | Launch Complex 3 complete | Completed |
| NET 2026 | Final integration | In progress |
| Q1 2026 | Delivery to Launch Complex 3 for qualification testing and acceptance | Not started |
| NET 2027 | Launch | Not started |

== Applications ==
Neutron is designed to lift up to 15,000 kg (33,100 lb) to LEO while expended, 13,000 kg (28,700 lb) while landing the booster downrange and up to 8,500 kg (18,700 lb) with the first stage returning to the launch site. Rocket Lab forecasts Neutron will be able to launch 98% of all payloads launched through 2029. Rocket Lab also intends the design to be able to support constellation deployment, deep space missions, and eventually human spaceflight.

In May 2025, Rocket Lab was awarded an evaluation contract to test for compatibility of Neutron with the USAF Rocket Cargo program for return-to-Earth cargo delivery anywhere on Earth.

== Launches ==
The first flight of Neutron is expected to be in 2027.

In September 2025, Rocket Lab planned to launch Neutron three times in 2026, and five times in 2027.

=== Prospects and market position ===
According to Rocket Lab, Neutron's expected debut launch in 2025 also puts the launch vehicle in a strong position to on-ramp onto the U.S. government's National Security Space Launch (NSSL) Lane 1 program, an indefinite delivery indefinite quantity (IDIQ) contract valued at $5.6 billion over a five-year period. RFPs for the program opened on October 30, 2024, with approved new launch vehicles to be on-ramped to the program in Spring 2025.

In November 2024, Rocket Lab announced that it had signed a multi-launch agreement with a confidential commercial satellite constellation operator to launch a satellite constellation using Neutron. Under the contract, Rocket Lab will launch two dedicated missions on Neutron starting from mid-2026. The missions will launch from Rocket Lab Launch Complex 3 on Wallops Island, Virginia. The launch service agreement for these missions signifies the beginning of a productive collaboration that could see Neutron deploy the entire constellation.

In May 2025, Rocket Lab announced that it had been awarded a launch contract by the U.S. Air Force Research Laboratory (AFRL) for Neutron to launch a Rocket Cargo mission. The launch will see Neutron execute a Rocket Cargo survivability experiment under the AFRL Rocket Experimentation for Global Agile Logistics (REGAL) solicitation, supporting the development of a cargo point-to-point transportation system. The mission is scheduled to launch no earlier than 2026.

In May 2026, Rocket Lab announced that it had signed a multi-launch agreement with a confidential customer that included five Neutron launches. The missions, scheduled to take place between 2026 and 2029, are set to launch from both Launch Complex 1 in New Zealand and Launch Complex 3 in Virginia.

== See also ==
Launch systems of comparable class and technology

(Reusable methane-fueled medium lift-off systems)

- LandSpace Zhuque-3
- Long March 12A
- i-Space Hyperbola-3
- Soyuz-7
