= 2026 in spaceflight =

- The Artemis II mission, in which the Earthset photo was captured, carried four astronauts around the Moon in April 2026.

Orbital launches
- First: 3 January
- Last: 20 November
- Total: 269
- Successes: 261
- Failures: 8
- Partial failures: 0

National firsts
- Orbital launch: Germany
- Space traveller: Hong Kong

Rockets
- Maiden flights: Ariane 64; Ceres-2; H3-24L; H3-30S; Kinetica 2; Long March 10B; Long March 12B; Pallas-1; Soyuz-2.1b / Volga; Soyuz-5; Starship Block 3; Tianlong-3; Vikram-1; Vulcan Centaur VC6L
- Retirements: Alpha Block I; Proton-M / DM-03; Atlas V 551; Pegasus XL

Crewed flights
- Orbital: 5
- Orbital travellers: 18
- Suborbital: 1
- Suborbital travellers: 6
- Total travellers: 24
- EVAs: 1

2026 in spaceflight

Notable spaceflight events during the year 2026.

== Overview ==
=== Astronomy and astrophysics ===
On 11 January, NASA launched the Pandora small space telescope to study exoplanet atmospheres. The same Falcon 9 flight also carried two CubeSat-type space telescopes by NASA: SPARCS and BlackCAT, alongside other payloads. Pandora completed its commissioning phase and started scientific observations in August 2026.

In February, ESA's experimental heliophysics mission PROBA-3 suffered an anomaly which led to the loss of contact with one of the two spacecraft. Contact was re-established with PROBA-3 in March and the spacecraft resumed observations in July.

On 19 May, ESA and CAS launched their joint heliophysics mission SMILE to study the dynamic interaction between solar wind and Earth's magnetosphere. The spacecraft reached its final science orbit on 20 June and started science observations on 23 September.

On 3 July, Katalyst Space Technologies launched the Swift boost mission under a contract from NASA to save the Neil Gehrels Swift Observatory by boosting it to a higher orbit. They used the LINK spacecraft launched on a Northrop Grumman Pegasus XL aircraft-borne rocket. This was the final launch of Pegasus XL and means there are no remaining active orbital air launch systems anywhere in the world. Once in orbit, LINK suffered a series of technical issues, and on 19 August, NASA cancelled the rescue efforts. Swift underwent an uncontrolled reentry into Earth's atmosphere on 4 November.

On 30 August, NASA launched the Nancy Grace Roman Space Telescope, an infrared space telescope for cosmology and search for exoplanets, to Sun-Earth Lagrange Point 2.

In 2026, NASA plans to launch the SunRISE mission consisting of six CubeSats for studying solar activity.

Taiwan plans to launch its first space telescope, the Gamma-ray Transients Monitor (GTM), as a secondary payload on the Formosat-8B satellite, in December.

=== Solar system exploration ===
On 15 May, NASA's Psyche spacecraft performed a gravity assist maneuver at Mars, flying 4,500 km from the planet's surface on its way to the asteroid Psyche.

In July 2026, humanity got the first close-up views of two new Solar system objects. CNSA's Tianwen-2 arrived at the near-Earth asteroid Kamoʻoalewa, a quasi-satellite of Earth, for sample collection and JAXA's Hayabusa2 flew by the near-Earth asteroid Torifune.

The joint ESA-JAXA mission BepiColombo reached Mercury in late 2026. The arrival operations began on 3 September with the separation of the propulsion module from the remaining spacecraft and continued with orbit insertion on 21 November.

On 20 October, JAXA launched the Martian Moons eXploration (MMX) mission to the moons of Mars with the aim of bringing back the first samples from Phobos. The mission also carries the European Phobos rover Idefix.

In early November, ESA's Hera spacecraft arrived at the double asteroid Didymos.

On 7 and 9 November, NASA's twin ESCAPADE spacecraft performed gravity assist maneuvers at Earth that sent them towards Mars.

On 18 November, Voyager 1 was one light-day from Earth.

On 24 December, ESA's Solar Orbiter is expected to perform its 5th Venus flyby, which will tilt its heliocentric orbit from 17° to 24°.

=== Human spaceflight ===
==== International Space Station ====
On 8 January, Mike Fincke, one of Crew-11 astronauts on the ISS, suffered a serious medical issue, which included a loss of ability to speak for approximately 20 minutes. In response, NASA called off a spacewalk that was under preparation at that time and later decided to return the entire Crew-11 mission back to Earth earlier than planned in a "controlled medical evacuation". This marks the first time in U.S. history, as well as in the ISS program, that a space mission has been cut short due to a medical issue, although such cases happened before during Soviet space station missions. The Crew Dragon Endeavour with all 4 crew members of Crew-11 safely splashed down off California coast on 15 January.

On 13 February, NASA launched the first crewed spaceflight of the year, the Crew-12 mission carrying four NASA, ESA, and Roscosmos astronauts to ISS, returning the station to its normal crew complement of seven in a rare indirect handover caused by the early return of Crew-11. The second crewed flight of the year to ISS was Soyuz MS-29 launched on 14 July and the third was Crew-13 launched on 1 October. Crew-13's commander Jessica Watkins became the first Black woman to command a space mission.

On 22 March, Roscosmos launched Progress MS-33 to ISS, the first space station uncrewed cargo flight of the year and the first launch from the Baikonur Cosmodrome Site 31 after substantial repairs necessitated by the damage caused by the November 2025 launch of Soyuz MS-28. Further resupply missions to ISS were: Cygnus NG-24 on 11 April, Progress MS-34 on 25 April, SpaceX CRS-34 on 15 May, and Progress MS-35 on 16 September.

==== Artemis program ====
On 30 January, Blue Origin announced that it will pause the New Shepard suborbital space tourism program for "at least two years" in order to focus on crewed lunar exploration. On 9 February, SpaceX likewise announced a delay in its Mars ambitions for "about five to seven years" in order to focus on lunar missions.

On 27 February, NASA announced a number of changes to the Artemis program with the stated purpose of increasing its cadence of missions, including changing the Artemis III mission to a LEO demonstration flight, moving the first Artemis Moon landing to Artemis IV, and replacing the Exploration Upper Stage with another stage, later identified as Centaur V.

On 1 April 2026, NASA launched the Artemis II mission on the Space Launch System, sending astronauts around the Moon on a ten-day lunar flyby. On 6 April, Artemis II became the farthest human spaceflight in history when it surpassed the previous distance record of Apollo 13. The mission's re-entry capsule Integrity safely splashed down in the Pacific Ocean southwest of San Diego on 11 April 2026.

==== Chinese lunar program ====
On 11 February, China performed a successful in-flight abort test of the new Mengzhou spacecraft, which verified the spacecraft's launch escape system performance, as well as the Long March 10A first stage ability of soft landing on water.

==== Tiangong space station ====
On 30 March, China launched a prototype of the new cargo spacecraft Qingzhou on the first flight of the Kinetica 2 rocket. Once in orbit, the spacecraft conducted a series of rendezvous and proximity operations tests involving another satellite.

On 11 May, China launched its first Tiangong space station resupply mission of the year, Tianzhou 10, followed by the first Chinese crewed spaceflight of the year, Shenzhou 23, on 24 May.

=== Rocket innovation ===
On 12 February, Arianespace launched 32 Amazon Leo satellites on the first flight of Ariane 64, the 4-booster variant of Ariane 6, marking the first successful orbital maiden flight of the year. Other successful first flights to orbit were achieved by the Chinese Kinetica 2, Long March 12B, Long March 10B, and Pallas-1, the Russian Soyuz-5, the Japanese H3-30S, and the Indian Vikram-1.

SpaceX continued testing the Starship system, with a partially successful suborbital Flight 12 in May, a mostly successful suborbital Flight 13 in July, and a mostly successful orbital Flight 14 in September. Progress was made in fully recovering the Starship launch vehicle with the first catch attempt of the Ship being successful on Flight 15 in November.

On 10 July, China became the second nation to successfully recover a booster after orbital flight, when a Long March 10B's first stage landed on a net-like structure on a ship at sea during its maiden flight. The second Chinese launcher to achieve first-stage recovery was Zhuque-3, after a successful orbital launch on 18 August.

On 11 July, JAXA conducted the first VTVL flight test of its RV-X small reusable rocket demonstrator. The vehicle serves as a technology pathfinder for CALLISTO, a larger European-Japanese demonstrator rocket under development in collaboration between JAXA, CNES, and DLR. ESA plans first test flights of the Themis reusable rocket demonstrator in late 2026.

On 18 July, Skyroot Aerospace launched Vikram 1, India's first commercially built rocket, with a successful flight carrying multiple payloads to Low Earth Orbit.

On 5 September, the German company Isar Aerospace, supported by ESA, successfully launched its Spectrum rocket from Andøya Spaceport in Norway, marking the first orbital launch from West European soil.

=== Satellite technology ===
In January, Hisdesat announced that the Spainsat NG II communications satellite launched in October 2025 for Spanish government and military use was struck by a “space particle" while on its way to Geostationary orbit and suffered non-recoverable damage.

On 12 January, the Spanish space capsule company Orbital Paradigm, supported by ESA's FLPP, launched its first technology demonstration mission. The KID capsule was expected to re-enter Earth atmosphere after reaching orbit on the PSLV-C62 flight. The Indian PSLV rocket failed in flight but KID separated from the falling launch vehicle and managed to transmit flight data during its non-nominal suborbital flight, thus becoming the lone survivor of 2026's first launch failure.

On 27 January, the EU announced that the EUSPA's GOVSATCOM program for encrypted communications is now operational, integrating eight satellites from five EU member states. The program serves as an operational bridge to the planned IRIS^{2} constellation. In March, Cyprus became the first country to use GOVSATCOM operationally, possibly in connection with the 2026 Iran war or the country's Presidency of the Council of the European Union. The IRIS^{2} project entered its implementation phase in August.

In March 2026, the Chinese company Sustain Space demonstrated on-orbit operations of a flexible robotic arm for satellite servicing and refuelling on its Xiyuan-0 satellite launched on a Kuaizhou-11 rocket on 16 March 2026.

On 28 March, ESA launched the first two satellites of the GNSS augmentation constellation Celeste (LEO-PNT) on a Rocket Lab's Electron rocket. The mission delivered its first navigation signals on 8 April 2026.

On 3 May, the German ICARUS Initiative launched its first operational satellite of the ICARUS 2.0 constellation, built by the Bulgarian company EnduroSat and named RAVEN, for tracking animal migrations.

On 27 August, Ariane 6 performed its first geostationary orbit mission, launching the European weather satellite MTG-I2 (Meteosat-14), which completed the first trio of MTG satellites. In a further expansion of its Earth observation satellite fleet, Europe launched ESA's FLEX for monitoring terrestrial vegetation by measuring chlorophyll fluorescence together with the oceanography satellite Sentinel-3C for the EU's Copernicus Programme on a single flight of the Vega C rocket on 15 September. Then in before the end of the year, Ariane 6 will launch the second MetOp-SG weather satellite, MetOp-SG B1 carrying microwave imagers and radars, to low Earth orbit.

On 31 August and 1 September, ESA sent a small airplane to observe the destructive reentries of the last two satellites of the magnetospheric mission Cluster II. To better coordinate the aerial observation campaign, ESA commanded the satellites in late January 2026 to slightly alter their orbits so they would reenter closer to each other. This initiative was part of ESA Space Safety Programme's efforts to reduce the risks of space debris and served as precursor to the Draco mission planned for 2027.

On 3 September, ISRO launched EOS-05, India's first geostationary Earth observation satellite. The satellite was launched on PSLV's return-to-flight mission after the failed PSLV-C62 in January 2026.

On 1 October 2026, Ukraine launched the first satellite of UASAT, its sovereign Satellite internet constellation.

In 2026, NASA plans to launch LOXSAT, a cryogenic fluid management demonstration satellite mission.

== Orbital launches ==
Numbers of orbital launches
| Month | Total | Successes | Failures | Partial failures |
|---|---|---|---|---|
| January | 24 | 21 | 3 | 0 |
| February | 18 | 18 | 0 | 0 |
| March | 30 | 29 | 1 | 0 |
| April | 31 | 29 | 2 | 0 |
| May | 22 | 22 | 0 | 0 |
| June | 29 | 29 | 0 | 0 |
| July | 26 | 26 | 0 | 0 |
| August | 26 | 25 | 1 | 0 |
| September | 27 | 27 | 0 | 0 |
| October | 21 | 21 | 0 | 0 |
| November | 15 | 14 | 1 | 0 |
| December | 0 | 0 | 0 | 0 |
| Total | 269 | 261 | 8 | 0 |

== Deep-space rendezvous ==
| Date (UTC) | Spacecraft | Event | Remarks |
|---|---|---|---|
| 11 March | Parker Solar Probe | 27th perihelion | Success |
| 6 April | Artemis II (Integrity) | Crewed flyby of the Moon | First crewed spacecraft beyond low Earth orbit and to the Moon's vicinity since Apollo 17 in December 1972 |
| 1 May | Juno | 83rd perijove | On the day of this perijove, Juno flew by Thebe at a distance of 5,000 km. |
| 15 May | Psyche | Flyby of Mars | Success, target altitude 4,500 km |
| 3 June | Juno | 84th perijove | On the day of this perijove, Juno flew by Adrastea at a distance of 11,747 km. |
| 7 June | Tianwen-2 | 469219 Kamoʻoalewa orbit insertion | Success |
| 8 June | Parker Solar Probe | 28th perihelion | Success |
| 4 July | Tianwen-2 | Rendezvous with 469219 Kamoʻoalewa and sample collection | Success |
| 5 July | Hayabusa2 | Flyby of 98943 Torifune | Success, target altitude 744 m |
| 5 September | Parker Solar Probe | 29th perihelion | Success |
| 29 September | JUICE | Second gravity assist at Earth | Success, target altitude 8,641 km |
| 11 October | Juno | 88th perijove | On the day of this perijove, Juno flew by Metis at a distance of 1,735 km. |
| 7 November | ESCAPADE Blue | Gravity assist at Earth | Success, target altitude 1,609 km |
| 9 November | ESCAPADE Gold | Gravity assist at Earth | Success, target altitude 1,046 km |
| 21 November | BepiColombo | Hermocentric orbit insertion at Mercury | |
| 2 December | Parker Solar Probe | 30th perihelion | |
| 3 December | Europa Clipper | Gravity assist at Earth | target altitude 3,200 km |
| 24 December | Solar Orbiter | Fifth gravity assist at Venus | This flyby of Venus will increase the inclination of the spacecraft's orbit further to 24 degrees, and will mark the start of the ‘high-latitude’ mission. |
| 28 December | Hera | Arrival at binary asteroid 65803 Didymos | |

== Extravehicular activities (EVAs) ==
| Start date/time | Duration | End time | Spacecraft | Crew | Remarks |

== Orbital launch statistics ==
=== By country ===
For the purposes of this section, the yearly tally of orbital launches by country assigns each flight to the country of origin of the rocket, not to the launch services provider or the spaceport.

| Country | Launches | Successes | Failures | Partial failures |
|---|---|---|---|---|
| China | 81 | 77 | 4 | 0 |
| France | 4 | 4 | 0 | 0 |
| Germany | 1 | 1 | 0 | 0 |
| India | 4 | 3 | 1 | 0 |
| Italy | 2 | 2 | 0 | 0 |
| Japan | 4 | 3 | 1 | 0 |
| Russia | 15 | 15 | 0 | 0 |
| South Korea | 1 | 1 | 0 | 0 |
| United States | 155 (Note: Includes Electron launches from Māhia) | 153 | 2 | 0 |
| World | 267 | 259 | 8 | 0 |

=== By rocket ===
- Ariane 6
- Atlas V
- Ceres-1
- Ceres-2
- Electron
- HASTE
- Falcon 9 new
- Falcon 9 reused
- Falcon Heavy
- H3
- GSLV
- LVM3
- PSLV
- SSLV
- Jielong 3
- Kinetica 1
- Kinetica 2
- Long March 2
- Long March 3
- Long March 4
- Long March 5
- Long March 6
- Long March 7
- Long March 8
- Long March 10
- Long March 11
- Long March 12
- Soyuz-2
- Zhuque-2
- Zhuque-3
- Kuaizhou 11
- Gravity-1
- Starship
- Vega C
- Vulcan
- Others

==== By family ====
| Family | Country | Launches | Successes | Failures | Partial failures | Remarks |
|---|---|---|---|---|---|---|
| Alpha | United States | 1 | 1 | 0 | 0 | |
| Angara | Russia | 1 | 1 | 0 | 0 | |
| Ariane | France | 4 | 4 | 0 | 0 | |
| Atlas | United States | 4 | 4 | 0 | 0 | |
| Ceres | China | 4 | 3 | 1 | 0 | |
| Electron | United States | 19 | 19 | 0 | 0 | |
| Falcon | United States | 123 | 123 | 0 | 0 | |
| Gravity | China | 2 | 2 | 0 | 0 | |
| H-series | Japan | 3 | 3 | 0 | 0 | |
| ILV | India | 3 | 2 | 1 | 0 | |
| Jielong | China | 4 | 4 | 0 | 0 | |
| KAIROS | Japan | 1 | 0 | 1 | 0 | |
| Kinetica | China | 7 | 7 | 0 | 0 | |
| Kuaizhou | China | 3 | 3 | 0 | 0 | |
| Long March | China | 54 | 52 | 2 | 0 | |
| Minotaur | United States | 1 | 1 | 0 | 0 | |
| New Glenn | United States | 1 | 0 | 1 | 0 | |
| Nuri | South Korea | 1 | 1 | 0 | 0 | |
| Pallas | China | 1 | 1 | 0 | 0 | Maiden flight |
| Pegasus | United States | 1 | 1 | 0 | 0 | Final flight |
| R-7 | Russia | 13 | 13 | 0 | 0 | |
| SLS | United States | 1 | 1 | 0 | 0 | |
| Spectrum | Germany | 1 | 1 | 0 | 0 | |
| Starship | United States | 2 | 2 | 0 | 0 | |
| Tianlong | China | 1 | 0 | 1 | 0 | |
| Universal Rocket | Russia | 1 | 1 | 0 | 0 | |
| Vega | Italy | 2 | 2 | 0 | 0 | |
| Vikram | India | 1 | 1 | 0 | 0 | Maiden flight |
| Vulcan | United States | 2 | 1 | 1 | 0 | |
| Zhuque | China | 5 | 5 | 0 | 0 | |

==== By type ====
| Rocket | Country | Family | Launches | Successes | Failures | Partial failures | Remarks |
|---|---|---|---|---|---|---|---|
| Alpha | United States | Alpha | 1 | 1 | 0 | 0 | |
| Angara-1.2 | Russia | Angara | 1 | 1 | 0 | 0 | |
| Ariane 6 | France | Ariane | 4 | 4 | 0 | 0 | |
| Atlas V | United States | Atlas | 4 | 4 | 0 | 0 | |
| Ceres-1 | China | Ceres | 2 | 2 | 0 | 0 | |
| Ceres-2 | China | Ceres | 2 | 1 | 1 | 0 | Maiden flight |
| Electron | United States | Electron | 19 | 19 | 0 | 0 | |
| Falcon 9 | United States | Falcon | 123 | 123 | 0 | 0 | |
| Gravity-1 | China | Gravity | 2 | 2 | 0 | 0 | |
| GSLV | India | ILV | 2 | 2 | 0 | 0 | |
| H3 | Japan | H-series | 3 | 3 | 0 | 0 | |
| Jielong 3 | China | Jielong | 4 | 4 | 0 | 0 | |
| KAIROS | Japan | KAIROS | 1 | 0 | 1 | 0 | |
| Kinetica 1 | China | Kinetica | 5 | 5 | 0 | 0 | |
| Kinetica 2 | China | Kinetica | 2 | 2 | 0 | 0 | Maiden flight |
| Kuaizhou 11 | China | Kuaizhou | 3 | 3 | 0 | 0 | |
| Long March 2 | China | Long March | 13 | 13 | 0 | 0 | |
| Long March 3 | China | Long March | 3 | 2 | 1 | 0 | |
| Long March 4 | China | Long March | 4 | 4 | 0 | 0 | |
| Long March 5 | China | Long March | 1 | 1 | 0 | 0 | |
| Long March 6 | China | Long March | 11 | 11 | 0 | 0 | |
| Long March 7 | China | Long March | 5 | 4 | 1 | 0 | |
| Long March 8 | China | Long March | 9 | 9 | 0 | 0 | |
| Long March 10 | China | Long March | 1 | 1 | 0 | 0 | Maiden flight |
| Long March 12 | China | Long March | 7 | 7 | 0 | 0 | |
| Minotaur IV | United States | Minotaur | 1 | 1 | 0 | 0 | |
| New Glenn | United States | New Glenn | 1 | 0 | 1 | 0 | First reuse |
| Nuri | South Korea | Nuri | 1 | 1 | 0 | 0 | |
| Pallas-1 | China | Pallas | 1 | 1 | 0 | 0 | Maiden flight |
| Pegasus | United States | Pegasus | 1 | 1 | 0 | 0 | Final flight |
| Proton | Russia | Universal Rocket | 1 | 1 | 0 | 0 | |
| PSLV | India | ILV | 1 | 0 | 1 | 0 | |
| SLS | United States | SLS | 1 | 1 | 0 | 0 | |
| Soyuz-2 | Russia | R-7 | 13 | 13 | 0 | 0 | |
| Spectrum | Germany | Spectrum | 1 | 1 | 0 | 0 | |
| Starship | United States | Starship | 2 | 2 | 0 | 0 | |
| Tianlong-3 | China | Tianlong | 1 | 0 | 1 | 0 | Maiden flight |
| Vega | Italy | Vega | 2 | 2 | 0 | 0 | |
| Vikram-1 | India | Vikram | 1 | 1 | 0 | 0 | Maiden flight |
| Vulcan Centaur | United States | Vulcan | 2 | 1 | 1 | 0 | |
| Zhuque-2 | China | Zhuque | 4 | 4 | 0 | 0 | |
| Zhuque-3 | China | Zhuque | 1 | 1 | 0 | 0 | |

==== By configuration ====
| Rocket | Country | Type | Launches | Successes | Failures | Partial failures | Remarks |
|---|---|---|---|---|---|---|---|
| Alpha Block I | United States | Alpha | 1 | 1 | 0 | 0 | Final flight |
| Angara-1.2 | Russia | Angara-1.2 | 1 | 1 | 0 | 0 | |
| Ariane 62 | France | Ariane 6 | 1 | 1 | 0 | 0 | |
| Ariane 64 | France | Ariane 6 | 3 | 3 | 0 | 0 | Maiden flight |
| Atlas V 551 | United States | Atlas V | 4 | 4 | 0 | 0 | Final flight |
| Ceres-1S | China | Ceres-1 | 2 | 2 | 0 | 0 | |
| Ceres-2 | China | Ceres-2 | 2 | 1 | 1 | 0 | Maiden flight |
| Electron | United States | Electron | 18 | 18 | 0 | 0 | |
| Falcon 9 Block 5 | United States | Falcon 9 | 120 | 120 | 0 | 0 | |
| Falcon Heavy | United States | Falcon 9 | 3 | 3 | 0 | 0 | |
| Gravity-1 | China | Gravity-1 | 2 | 2 | 0 | 0 | |
| GSLV Mark II | India | GSLV | 2 | 2 | 0 | 0 | |
| HASTE | United States | Electron | 1 | 1 | 0 | 0 | First orbital flight |
| H3-22S | Japan | H3 | 1 | 1 | 0 | 0 | |
| H3-24L | Japan | H3 | 1 | 1 | 0 | 0 | Maiden flight |
| H3-30S | Japan | H3 | 1 | 1 | 0 | 0 | Maiden flight |
| Jielong 3 | China | Jielong 3 | 4 | 4 | 0 | 0 | |
| KAIROS | Japan | KAIROS | 1 | 0 | 1 | 0 | |
| Kinetica 1 | China | Kinetica 1 | 5 | 5 | 0 | 0 | |
| Kinetica 2 | China | Kinetica 2 | 2 | 2 | 0 | 0 | Maiden flight |
| Kuaizhou 11 | China | Kuaizhou 11 | 3 | 3 | 0 | 0 | |
| Long March 2C | China | Long March 2 | 4 | 4 | 0 | 0 | |
| Long March 2C / YZ-1S | China | Long March 2 | 1 | 1 | 0 | 0 | |
| Long March 2D | China | Long March 2 | 6 | 6 | 0 | 0 | |
| Long March 2F/G | China | Long March 2 | 1 | 1 | 0 | 0 | |
| Long March 2F/T | China | Long March 2 | 1 | 1 | 0 | 0 | |
| Long March 3B/E | China | Long March 3 | 3 | 2 | 1 | 0 | |
| Long March 4B | China | Long March 4 | 3 | 3 | 0 | 0 | |
| Long March 4C | China | Long March 4 | 1 | 1 | 0 | 0 | |
| Long March 5 | China | Long March 5 | 1 | 1 | 0 | 0 | |
| Long March 6 | China | Long March 6 | 1 | 1 | 0 | 0 | |
| Long March 6A | China | Long March 6 | 9 | 9 | 0 | 0 | |
| Long March 6C | China | Long March 6 | 1 | 1 | 0 | 0 | |
| Long March 7 | China | Long March 7 | 1 | 1 | 0 | 0 | |
| Long March 7A | China | Long March 7 | 4 | 3 | 1 | 0 | |
| Long March 8 | China | Long March 8 | 3 | 3 | 0 | 0 | |
| Long March 8A | China | Long March 8 | 6 | 6 | 0 | 0 | |
| Long March 10B | China | Long March 10 | 1 | 1 | 0 | 0 | Maiden flight |
| Long March 12 | China | Long March 12 | 6 | 6 | 0 | 0 | |
| Long March 12B | China | Long March 12 | 1 | 1 | 0 | 0 | Maiden flight |
| Minotaur IV | United States | Minotaur IV | 1 | 1 | 0 | 0 | |
| New Glenn | United States | New Glenn | 1 | 0 | 1 | 0 | First reuse |
| Nuri | South Korea | Nuri | 1 | 1 | 0 | 0 | |
| Pallas-1 | China | Pallas-1 | 1 | 1 | 0 | 0 | Maiden flight |
| Pegasus XL | United States | Pegasus | 1 | 1 | 0 | 0 | Final Flight |
| Proton-M / DM-03 | Russia | Proton | 1 | 1 | 0 | 0 | Final flight |
| PSLV-DL | India | PSLV | 1 | 0 | 1 | 0 | |
| SLS Block 1 | United States | SLS | 1 | 1 | 0 | 0 | |
| Soyuz-2.1a | Russia | Soyuz-2 | 3 | 3 | 0 | 0 | |
| Soyuz-2.1a / Fregat-M | Russia | Soyuz-2 | 2 | 2 | 0 | 0 | |
| Soyuz-2.1b | Russia | Soyuz-2 | 2 | 2 | 0 | 0 | |
| Soyuz-2.1b / Fregat-M | Russia | Soyuz-2 | 5 | 5 | 0 | 0 | |
| Soyuz-2.1b / Volga | Russia | Soyuz-2 | 1 | 1 | 0 | 0 | Maiden flight |
| Spectrum | Germany | Spectrum | 1 | 1 | 0 | 0 | |
| Starship Block 3 | United States | Starship | 2 | 2 | 0 | 0 | |
| Tianlong-3 | China | Tianlong-3 | 1 | 0 | 1 | 0 | Maiden flight |
| Vega C | Italy | Vega | 2 | 2 | 0 | 0 | |
| Vikram-1 | India | Vikram-1 | 1 | 1 | 0 | 0 | Maiden flight |
| Vulcan Centaur VC4S | United States | Vulcan Centaur | 1 | 1 | 0 | 0 | |
| Vulcan Centaur VC6L | United States | Vulcan Centaur | 1 | 0 | 1 | 0 | Maiden filght |
| Zhuque-2E | China | Zhuque-2 | 4 | 4 | 0 | 0 | |
| Zhuque-3 | China | Zhuque-3 | 1 | 1 | 0 | 0 | |

=== By spaceport ===
- Jiuquan
- South China Sea
- Taiyuan
- Wenchang
- Xichang
- Yellow Sea
- Kourou
- Satish Dhawan
- Kii
- Tanegashima
- Baikonur
- Māhia
- Plesetsk
- Vostochny
- Cape Canaveral
- Kennedy
- MARS
- Starbase
- Vandenberg
- Alcântara
- Semnan
- Palmachim
- Kwajalein
- Andøya
- Naro

| Site | Country | Launches | Successes | Failures | Partial failures | Remarks |
|---|---|---|---|---|---|---|
| Andøya | Norway | 1 | 1 | 0 | 0 | |
| Baikonur | Kazakhstan | 5 | 5 | 0 | 0 | |
| Cape Canaveral | United States | 57 | 55 | 2 | 0 | |
| Jiuquan | China | 30 | 28 | 2 | 0 | |
| Kennedy | United States | 4 | 4 | 0 | 0 | |
| Kii | Japan | 1 | 0 | 1 | 0 | |
| Kourou | France | 6 | 6 | 0 | 0 | |
| Kwajalein | Marshall Islands | 1 | 1 | 0 | 0 | |
| Mahia | New Zealand | 18 | 18 | 0 | 0 | |
| MARS | United States | 1 | 1 | 0 | 0 | |
| Naro | South Korea | 1 | 1 | 0 | 0 | |
| Plesetsk | Russia | 9 | 9 | 0 | 0 | |
| Satish Dhawan | India | 4 | 3 | 1 | 0 | |
| South China Sea | China | 2 | 2 | 0 | 0 | |
| Starbase | United States | 2 | 2 | 0 | 0 | |
| Taiyuan | China | 14 | 14 | 0 | 0 | |
| Tanegashima | Japan | 3 | 3 | 0 | 0 | |
| Vandenberg | United States | 72 | 72 | 0 | 0 | |
| Vostochny | Russia | 1 | 1 | 0 | 0 | |
| Wenchang | China | 22 | 21 | 1 | 0 | |
| Xichang | China | 7 | 6 | 1 | 0 | |
| Yellow Sea | China | 6 | 6 | 0 | 0 | |
| Total | | 267 | 259 | 8 | 0 | |

=== By orbit ===
- Transatmospheric
- Low Earth
- Low Earth (ISS)
- Low Earth (CSS)
- Low Earth (SSO)
- Low Earth (polar)
- Low Earth (retrograde)
- Medium Earth
- Molniya
- Geosynchronous
- High Earth
- Lunar transfer
- Heliocentric

| Orbital regime | Launches | Achieved | Not achieved | Accidentally achieved | Remarks |
|---|---|---|---|---|---|
| Transatmospheric | 0 | 0 | 0 | 0 | |
| Low Earth | 238 | 232 | 6 | 0 | |
| Geosynchronous / transfer | 19 | 17 | 2 | 0 | |
| Medium Earth / Molniya | 7 | 7 | 0 | 0 | |
| High Earth / Lunar transfer | 1 | 1 | 0 | 0 | |
| Heliocentric orbit | 2 | 2 | 0 | 0 | Including planetary transfer orbits |
| Total | 267 | 259 | 8 | 0 | |

== Suborbital launch statistics ==
=== By country ===
For the purposes of this section, the yearly tally of suborbital launches by country assigns each flight to the country of origin of the rocket, not to the launch services provider or the spaceport. Flights intended to fly below 80 km (50 mi) are omitted. This includes suborbital flights for all purposes, including scientific and military application.

| Country | Launches | Successes | Failures | Partial failures |
|---|---|---|---|---|
| Canada | 5 | 5 | 0 | 0 |
| China | 3 | 3 | 0 | 0 |
| Russia | 4 | 4 | 0 | 0 |
| United States | 10 | 10 | 0 | 0 |
| Norway | 1 | 1 | 0 | 0 |
| World | 26 | 26 | 0 | 0 |

== Maiden flights ==
| Rocket | Origin | Organization | Reusable | Launch | Outcome | Ref. |
|---|---|---|---|---|---|---|
| Ceres-2 | China | Galactic Energy | —N/a | 17 January | Failure | |
| Ariane 64 | France | ArianeGroup | —N/a | 12 February | Success | |
| Kinetica 2 | China | CAS Space | —N/a | 30 March | Success | |
| Tianlong-3 | China | Space Pioneer | First stage | 3 April | Failure | |
| Irtysh (Soyuz 5) | Russia | TsSKB Progress | —N/a | 30 April | Success | |
| Starship Block 3 | USA | SpaceX | Fully | 22 May | Partial success (Note: See Starship flight test 12 for details) | |
| Long March 12B | China | CASC | First stage | 1 June | Success | |
| H3-30S | Japan | JAXA and MHI | —N/a | 12 June | Success | |
| Long March 10B | China | CALT | First stage | 10 July | Success | |
| Vikram-1 | India | Skyroot Aerospace | —N/a | 18 July | Success | |
| Pallas-1 | China | Galactic Energy | First stage | 1 September | Success | |
| Long March 10A | China | CALT | First stage | Mid 2026 | TBD | |
| HLVM3 | India | ISRO | —N/a | H2 | TBD | |
| Terran R | USA | Relativity Space | First stage | Q4 | TBD | |
| Yuanxingzhe-1 | China | Space Epoch | First stage | Late 2026 | TBD | |
| Hyperbola-3 | China | i-Space | First stage | 2026 | TBD | |
| Zhihang-1 | China | Zenk Space (Note: Full company name: Beijing Space Zhihang Technology Co., Ltd.) | Engine bay | 2026 | TBD | |
| Nebula-1 | China | Deep Blue Aerospace | First stage | 2026 | TBD | |
| Mir (All stages variant) | South Korea | ADD | —N/a | 2026 | TBD | |

== See also ==
- 2026 in science
- 2026 in Antarctica
- International Space Summit
