= Long March 12B =

Chinese medium-lift reusable carrier rocket

- Function: Medium-lift to heavy-lift launch vehicle
- Manufacturer: China Aerospace Science and Technology Corporation Commercial Rocket Co., Ltd.
- Country of origin: China

Size
- Height: ~72 m (236 ft 3 in)
- Diameter: 4.37 m (14 ft 4 in)
- Mass: > 437,000 kg (963,000 lb)
- Stages: 2

Capacity

Payload to LEO
- Altitude: 200 km (120 mi)
- Mass: ~20,000 kg (44,000 lb) expendable, 12,000 kg (26,000 lb) reusable

Payload to SSO
- Altitude: 500 km (310 mi)
- Mass: ~12,000 kg (26,000 lb) expendable

Associated rockets
- Family: Long March
- Comparable: Long March 7; Long March 8; Long March 12; Angara A5; Ariane 6; Atlas V; Falcon 9; GSLV; H3; LVM3; Soyuz-2; Zenit 2

Launch history
- Status: Active
- Launch sites: Jiuquan, CZ-12 pad
- Total launches: 1
- Success(es): 1
- Failure: 0
- First flight: 1 June 2026

First stage
- Powered by: 9 × YF102R
- Maximum thrust: 7,515 kN (1,689,000 lbf)
- Specific impulse: 275.3 seconds (2.700 km/s)
- Propellant: RP-1 / LOX

Second stage
- Powered by: YF-102RV
- Maximum thrust: 835 kN (188,000 lbf)
- Propellant: RP-1 / LOX

The Long March 12B (Chinese: 长征十二号乙运载火箭; pinyin: Chang Zheng 12B, abbreviated LM-12B or CZ-12B), is a Chinese two-stage reusable medium-lift to heavy-lift launch vehicle, a commercially-oriented variant of the Long March 12. Its maiden flight in June 2026, from Jiuquan Satellite Launch Center, was successful, while booster recovery was not attempted.

Both CZ-12B stages are kerolox-fuelled and four meters in diameter. The first stage, powered by nine YF-102R engines, is designed to be reused after stage-recovery via propulsive landing. The second stage is powered by a single YF-102RV engine. The rocket is being developed by the China Aerospace Science and Technology Corporation Commercial Rocket Co., Ltd. (CACL), operating under the state-owned China Aerospace Science and Technology Corporation (CASC).

== History ==
CACL has described the CZ-12B as a 4-meter-diameter class rocket using a kerosene and liquid oxygen propellant mix, unlike the CZ-12A which uses methane and liquid oxygen. CACL further describes the CZ-12B as having a “20-ton-class low Earth orbit carrying capacity”, this is likely in an expendable mode.

A static fire test of the rocket's first stage occurred on 16 January 2026 at the Dongfeng Commercial Space Innovation Test Zone within the Jiuquan Satellite Launch Center in northwest China. The first launch of the CZ-12B occurred on 1 June 2026; the mission was a success and placed the 08 Group of the Qianfan Constellation into polar orbits.

== Design ==
The diameter of the CZ-12B rocket is determined by three factors during the design stage: (1) the requirement to accommodate nine engines in the rocket's first stage in order to increase payload capacity, (2) available options for transporting the manufactured rocket stages from the factory to the launch site, and (3) the rocket's length to diameter ratio. In particular, the relative ease of transporting the stages by road rather than by rail, coupled with the size of the YF-102R engines, constrained the rocket diameter to between 4.2 and 4.5 metres. Additionally, considerations such as the rocket's vibrational mode and structural response to external loads during launch prompted the design team to choose a length-to-diameter ratio of about 16 with an overall rocket length of about 72 metres. These design choices resulted in the team ultimately choosing a rocket diameter of 4.37 metres for the CZ-12B from the "preferred number system" (a list of preferred rocket diameters determined via calculations and modeling).

According to Shan Lei of the China Aerospace Science and Technology Corporation, the design team selected the YF-102R and YF-102RV for the CZ-12B due to the robustness and relative simplicity of the engines' open cycle design (as compared to engines based on the staged combustion cycle) which speeds up the development process at the expense of some degree of engine efficiency. In addition, these engines have the capability for multiple restarts and allow for a wide range of thrust adjustments which open up the prospect for stage recovery and reuse: the YF-102R engines use a high-flow-rate needle-type injector to inject propellant through the central needle for mixing and combustion which is a relatively simple method that facilitates thrust adjustment. Finally, the compact layout of the nine engines first-stage CZ-12B design also argues for the choice of the YF-102R because it uses a 'post-pump oscillation mechanism': “The turbopump doesn’t swing; only the thrust chamber section swings. The swing mechanism is small, so it occupies less lateral space,” said Shan Lei.

== Launch statistics ==
- Failure
- Partial failure
- Success
- Planned

== List of launches ==
Flight	Launch (UTC)	Payload	Orbit	Launch site	Outcome	Booster recovery
Y1	1 June 2026; 08:40	Qianfan Polar Group 08	Polar	Jiuquan, CZ-12 pad	Success	Not attempted
Y1	First flight of the CZ-12B. First stage recovery was not attempted.					

== See also ==
- Long March 12
- Long March 12A
- Comparison of orbital launcher families
- Comparison of orbital launch systems
- Reusable launch vehicle
- Expendable launch system
- Lists of rockets
