= YF-102 (rocket engine) =

Rocket engine

- Country of origin: China
- Designer: Academy of Aerospace Liquid Propulsion Technology
- Status: Active

Liquid-fuel engine
- Propellant: LOX / RP-1
- Cycle: Gas-Generator Cycle

Configuration
- Chamber: 1

Performance
- Thrust, sea-level: 835 kN (188,000 lbf)
- Throttle range: 620 kN (140,000 lbf) to 835 kN (188,000 lbf)
- Chamber pressure: 8.5 MPa (1,230 psi)
- Specific impulse, sea-level: 275.3 seconds (2.700 km/s)
- Burn time: 130 s
- Restarts: Multiple
- Gimbal range: 6°

Dimensions
- Length: 2,178 millimetres (85.7 in)

Used in
- Tianlong-2

The YF-102 is a Chinese liquid rocket engine burning LOX and kerosene in a gas generator cycle. It is manufactured by the AALPT based on the experience of previous kerolox engines, and using 3D printing technology and is capable of multiple restarts. It is used in Tianlong-2 launch vehicle developed by Space Pioneer.

== History ==
The engine was revealed in 2021 without a target launch vehicle. In its presentation video, it was shown in a five engine configuration on a 3.35m diameter first stage and as a single engine on the second stage. As of October 2021, it was in an advanced state of development, with six fully assembled prototypes some of which had achieved over 200 seconds of test firing. It was stated that it could be ready by 2022. A reusable version, YF-102R could be ready by 2026 according to the manufacturer.

In 2023, Space Pioneer, a Chinese private aerospace startup used YF-102 engines to power its Tianlong-2 Rocket. Tianlong-2 is a medium-sized, 3-stage rocket powered by RP-1 and liquid oxygen, with a payload capability of 2 tonnes to LEO and 1.5 tonnes to SSO. The three first-stage YF-102 were arranged in a triangular arrangement.

== Use on Kinetica 2 ==
In an exchange with a journalist, CAS Space confirmed that initial flights of their Kinetica 2 launch vehicle will use a total of nine YF-102 engines to power its first phase of flight. CAS Space also indicated the intention to later replace YF-102 with an in-house engine design.

== See also ==
- YF-100 – First stage Chinese rocket engine which is a previous kerolox engine from the manufacturer.
- YF-115 – Upper stage Chinese rocket engine which is a previous kerolox engine from the manufacturer.
