= Haolong (spacecraft) =

Chinese reusable cargo spaceplane

- Manufacturer: CADI
- Country of origin: China
- Operator: CMSA

Related spacecraft
- Launch vehicle: Zhuque-3

Haolong (昊龙) is a future Chinese reusable cargo spaceplane under development by the Chengdu Aircraft Research and Design Institute. The spacecraft will launch vertically atop a Zhuque-3 rocket, dock with the Tiangong space station, and end its mission by landing horizontally on a runway. It is 10 m long, 8 m wide, weighs around 7,000 kg, and is capable of carrying up to 2,000 kg of cargo in 27 cubic meters. Haolong was selected in 2024 by China Manned Space Agency as one of two low-cost cargo spacecraft, along with Qingzhou, to fly resupply missions to the Tiangong Space Station.
