= Qingzhou (spacecraft) =

Chinese cargo spacecraft

- Manufacturer: CAS Space
- Country of origin: China
- Operator: China Manned Space Agency (CMSA)
- Applications: Logistics for the Tiangong space station

Specifications
- Spacecraft type: Cargo spacecraft
- Launch mass: 5,000 kg (11,000 lb)
- Dry mass: 3,200 kg (7,100 lb)
- Payload capacity: 1,800 kg (4,000 lb) (up); 2,000 kg (4,400 lb) (down)
- Volume: 27 m³ (pressurized); 9 m³ (loading)
- Regime: Low Earth orbit

Dimensions
- Length: 5 m (16 ft)
- Diameter: 3.3 m (11 ft)

Production
- Status: Active
- Built: 1
- Launched: 1
- Operational: 1
- Maiden launch: 30 March 2026

Related spacecraft
- Launch vehicle: Kinetica 2 (Lijian-2)

Qingzhou (Chinese: 轻舟货运飞船; pinyin: Qīngzhōu huòyùn fēichuán) is a class of cargo spacecraft developed by CAS Space, a company founded by the Chinese Academy of Sciences. It is part of the China Manned Space Program's low-cost cargo transportation system designed to support the Tiangong space station.

A prototype version of the Qingzhou spacecraft was successfully launched as the primary payload of the maiden flight of the Kinetica-2 (Lijian-2) rocket on 30 March 2026. The first production-standard spacecraft is expected to be ready for flight by late 2026.

== Etymology ==
The name Qingzhou, meaning "Light Boat", is derived from a famous poem by the Tang dynasty poet Li Bai: "The light boat has already passed ten thousand mountains" (轻舟已过万重山). According to the developers, the name symbolizes the spirit of overcoming difficulties and the determination to explore the stars.

== History ==
In May 2023, the China Manned Space Agency (CMSA) issued a public solicitation for proposals for a low-cost cargo transportation system. Key requirements included an upmass capacity of at least 1.8 tonnes (1.8 long tons; 2.0 short tons), a pressurized volume of at least 7 cubic metres (250 cu ft), the ability to remain docked for at least three months, a waste disposal capacity of at least 2 tonnes (2.0 long tons; 2.2 short tons), and a target cost of no more than 120 million RMB per ton.

In September 2023, IAMCAS's proposal was selected as one of the four finalists from ten submissions. By October 2024, the CMSA announced that the Qingzhou spacecraft and the Haolong cargo spaceplane (developed by the Chengdu Aircraft Design Institute) had won the final competition and were awarded contracts for flight verification.

On 30 March 2026, a prototype version of Qingzhou was launched on the maiden flight of CAS Space's Kinetica 2.

== Design ==
Qingzhou features an integrated single-cabin configuration consisting of a cylindrical pressurized module with a conical nose and an unpressurized aft section. The spacecraft is approximately 5 metres (16 ft) long with a diameter of 3.3 metres (11 ft).

The interior provides a pressurized volume of 27 cubic metres (950 cu ft) and a cargo capacity of 9 cubic metres (320 cu ft) and 1.8 tonnes (1.8 long tons; 2.0 short tons). The cargo bay utilizes a four-tier shelving system with 40 compartments and can accommodate up to five 60-liter cold chain containers for biological or medical supplies.

The spacecraft is designed to support both crewed and uncrewed space science experiments and various on-orbit testing tasks, but also to be lighter and lower-cost than the existing Tianzhou.

== See also ==
- Tianzhou (spacecraft)
- Tiangong space station
