= Jiuquan Satellite Launch Center =

Chinese launch site

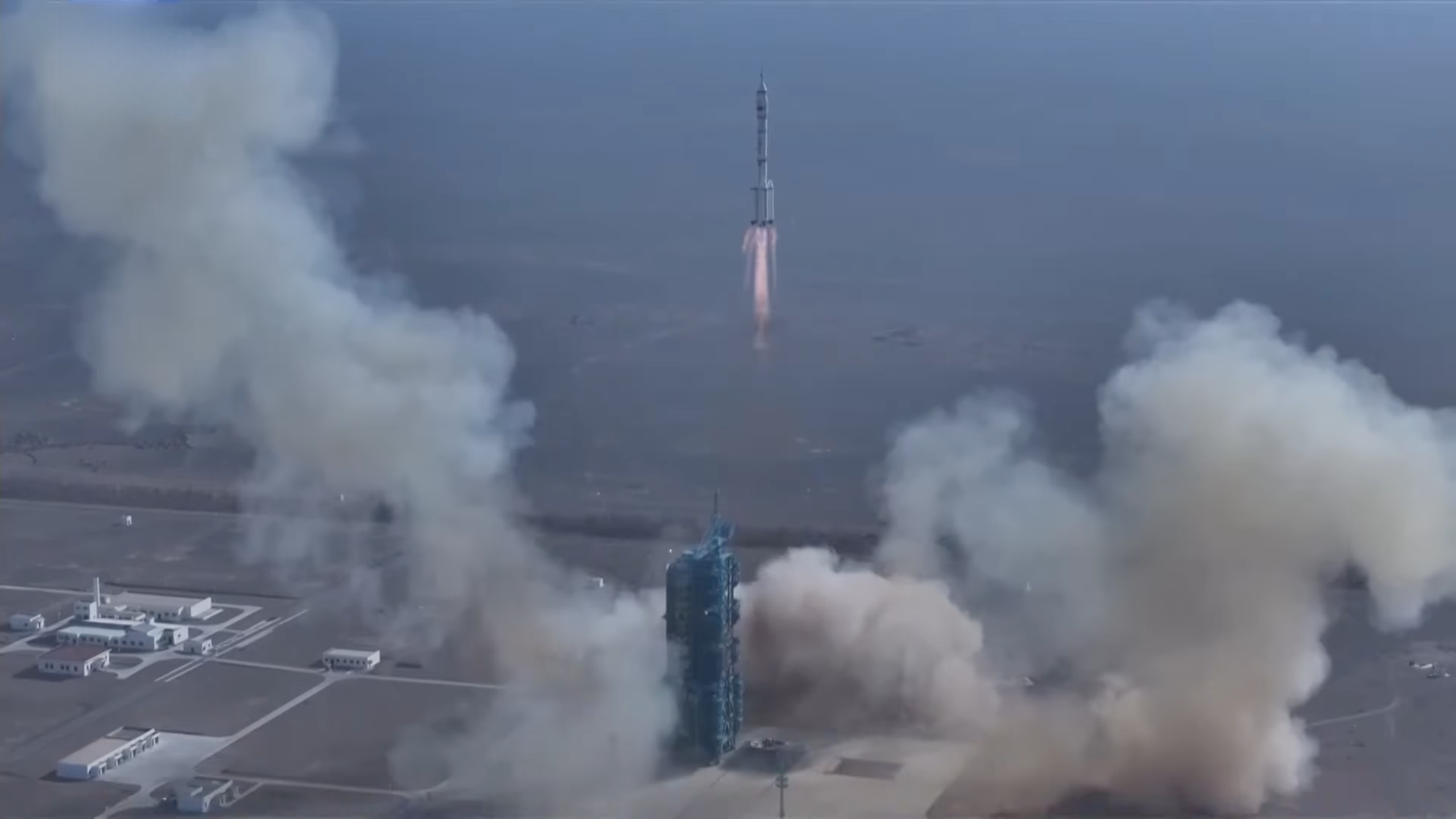
- Shenzhou 22 departs Jiuquan Launch Area 4, 2025
- Interactive map of Jiuquan Satellite Launch Center
- Location: Ejin, Alxa, Inner Mongolia & Hangtian, Jinta, Jiuquan, Gansu
- Coordinates: 40°57′29″N 100°17′28″E
- Time zone: UTC+8 (China Standard)
- Operator: China Aerospace Science and Technology Corporation
- Total launches: 273
- Launch pad: 15
SLS-1 launch history
- Status: Active
- Launches: 29
- First launch: 19 November 1999; Long March 2F / Shenzhou 1
- Last launch: 24 May 2026; Long March 2F / Shenzhou 23
- Associated rockets: Long March 2F
SLS-2 launch history
- Status: Active
- Launches: 139
- First launch: 3 November 2003; Long March 2D / FSW-3 1
- Last launch: 11 November 2026; Long March 2D / CAS Pathfinder-1
- Associated rockets: Long March 2C; Long March 2D; Long March 4B; Long March 4C
LS-95A launch history
- Status: Active
- Launches: 70
- First launch: 25 September 2013; Kuaizhou-1 / Kuaizhou 1 (satellite)
- Last launch: 6 November 2026; Ceres-2 / 4 Satellites
- Associated rockets: Kuaizhou-1 (retired); OS-M1 (retired); Zhuque-1 (retired); Kaituozhe-2 (retired); Kuaizhou-1A; Kuaizhou-11; Hyperbola-1; Ceres-1; Long March 11; Jielong 1 Ceres-2
LS-96 launch history
- Status: Active
- Launches: 10
- First launch: 14 December 2022; Zhuque-2 / various satellites
- Last launch: 14 October 2026; Zhuque-2 / 10 Satellites
- Associated rockets: Zhuque-2
LS-96B launch history
- Status: Active
- Launches: 2
- First launch: 3 December 2025; Zhuque-3 / Demo Flight
- Last launch: 18 August 2026; Zhuque-3 / Honghu-03
- Associated rockets: Zhuque-3
LS-120 launch history
- Status: Active
- Launches: 1
- First launch: 2 April 2023; Tianlong-2 / Jinta
- Last launch: 2 April 2023; Tianlong-2 / Jinta
- Associated rockets: Tianlong-2
LS-130 launch history
- Status: Active
- Launches: 16
- First launch: 27 July 2022; Kinetica 1 / SATech 01
- Last launch: 20 September 2026; Kinetica 1 / 9 Satellites
- Associated rockets: Kinetica 1
LS-140 launch history
- Status: Active
- Launches: 2
- First launch: 30 March 2026; Kinetica 2 / Demo Flight (Qingzhou Prototype Spacecraft)
- Last launch: 3 November 2026; Kinetica 2 / G60 Polar Group #17
- Associated rockets: Kinetica 2
CZ-12 Pad launch history
- Status: Active
- Launches: 2
- First launch: 23 December 2025; Long March 12A / Demo Flight
- Last launch: 1 June 2026; Long March 12B / Demo Flight
- Associated rockets: Long March 12A; Long March 12B
Tianlong-3 Pad launch history
- Status: Active
- Launches: 1
- First launch: 3 April 2026; Tianlong-3 / Demo Flight
- Associated rockets: Tianlong-3
Pallas-1 Pad launch history
- Status: Active
- Launches: 1
- First launch: 1 September 2026; Pallas-1 / Demo Flight
- Associated rockets: Pallas-1

Jiuquan Satellite Launch Center
- Simplified Chinese: 酒泉卫星发射中心
- Traditional Chinese: 酒泉衛星發射中心
Transcriptions
Standard Mandarin
- Hanyu Pinyin: Jiǔquán wèixīng fāshè zhōngxīn
- IPA: [tɕjòʊtɕʰɥɛ̌n wêɪɕíŋ fáʂɤ̂ ʈʂʊ́ŋɕín]

Jiuquan Satellite Launch Center (JSLC; Chinese: 酒泉卫星发射中心; pinyin: Jiǔquán Wèixīng Fāshè Zhōngxīn) is a Chinese spaceport and a corps-grade unit subordinate to the People's Liberation Army Aerospace Force. Its facilities are located across Ejin Banner, Inner Mongolia, and Jinta County, Gansu.

The center forms part of Dongfeng Aerospace City (Base 10). Although most of the facility lies within Jinta County, the spaceport is named after Jiuquan. The launch center spans both sides of the Ruo Shui river.

The site has supported many major Chinese space milestones, including the launch of Dong Fang Hong I in 1970, China's first satellite, and first human spaceflight Shenzhou 5 in 2003. As of 2026, all Chinese crewed launches have originated from Jiuquan, via the Shenzhou spacecraft and Long March 2F rocket. The rocket also launches the robotic military spaceplane termed the Chinese reusable experimental spacecraft from Jiuquan.

== Name ==
The United States Intelligence Community previously designated the site as the Shuang-ch'eng-tzu Missile Test Range (SCTMTR). The base has also been referred to as Launch Complex B2, the Northwest Comprehensive Missile Testing Facility (西北综合导弹试验基地), Base 20, or Unit 63600.

== History ==
Founded in 1958, JSLC is the oldest of China's four spaceports. Like most Chinese launch facilities, it is located in a remote area and is generally closed to foreign visitors.

The launch center is part of Dongfeng Space City (东风航天城), also known as Base 10 (十号基地) or the Dongfeng base (东风基地). The broader Dongfeng site includes test-flight facilities for the People's Liberation Army Air Force (PLAAF), a space museum, and a martyrs' cemetery (东风烈士陵园).

JSLC is used for launching spacecraft into low- and medium-Earth orbits with high inclination, as well as for testing medium- and long-range missiles. Its facilities include the technical center, launch complexes, launch control center, mission command center, and associated logistical systems.

The center covers about 2,800 km^{2} and reportedly houses up to 20,000 personnel. Many of its systems and equipment were likely modelled on Soviet designs, and the Soviet Union probably provided early technical assistance.

JSLC was expanded during China's Third Front campaign to develop defense-related industry in inland regions in anticipation of potential conflict with the Soviet Union or the United States.

The site has supported many major Chinese space milestones, including the launch of China's first satellite Dong Fang Hong I in 1970, and the first crewed space mission Shenzhou 5 in 2003. As of 2021, all Chinese crewed launches—including missions to the Tiangong space station—have originated from Jiuquan.

In August 2016, China launched the first quantum-communication satellite, Quantum Experiments at Space Scale, from JSLC.

In August 2018, Chinese commercial rocket companies i-Space and OneSpace conducted sub-orbital launches from the center. On 25 July 2019, I-Space carried out the first successful Chinese private orbital launch from Jiuquan using the Hyperbola-1 rocket.

== Launch pads ==
The launch site includes two launch complexes, each with multiple pads.

=== North Launch Complex ===
The North Launch Complex contains two inactive launch areas.

- Launch Area 2: used for orbital launches and ballistic-missile tests.
  - LA-2A: used for DF-3 and DF-5 ballistic-missile launches and for the earliest Chinese orbital missions using the CZ-1 (last orbital launch in 1971). (41.3088°N 100.3165°E)
  - LA-2B: used for CZ-2A, CZ-2C, CZ-2D, and FB-1 launches (last used in 1996). (41.3061°N 100.3132°E)
- Launch Area 3: located about 2.7 kilometres (1.7 mi) south of LA-2, used for DF-1, DF-2, and R-2 missile launches.
  - North pad (41.2831°N 100.3047°E)
  - South pad (41.2804°N 100.3045°E)

=== South Launch Complex ===
The South Launch Complex is active and supports launches of CASC's Long March vehicles as well as commercial rockets.

- Launch Area 4: about 37.9 kilometres (23.5 mi) south of LA-3.
  - SLS-1 (LS-43/91): active since 1999, used for crew-rated Long March 2F missions and served by a nearby Vertical Assembly Facility. (40.957893°N 100.290944°E)
  - SLS-2 (LS-43/94): active since 2003, used for Long March 2C, Long March 2D, Long March 4B, and Long March 4C launches. (40.960671°N 100.298186°E)
- Commercial launch pads (various locations south and east of LA-4):
  - LS-95: two pads used for Long March 11, Kuaizhou, Jielong 1, OS-M1, Hyperbola-1, and Ceres-1 launches.
    - Pad A (40.9698°N 100.3439°E)
    - Pad B (40.9725°N 100.3639°E)
  - LS-96: operated by LandSpace for the Zhuque-2 launcher. (40.9149°N 100.2454°E)
  - LS-120: operated by Space Pioneer for the Tianlong-2 launcher. (40.8556°N 100.1992°E)
  - LS-130: operated by CAS Space for the Kinetica 1 launcher. (40.8186°N 100.2240°E)
    - LS-140: operated by CAS Space for the Kinetica 2 launcher.

== Image gallery ==
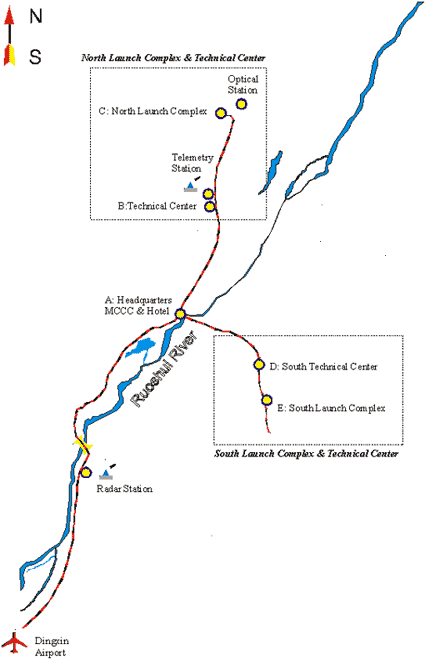
Site map

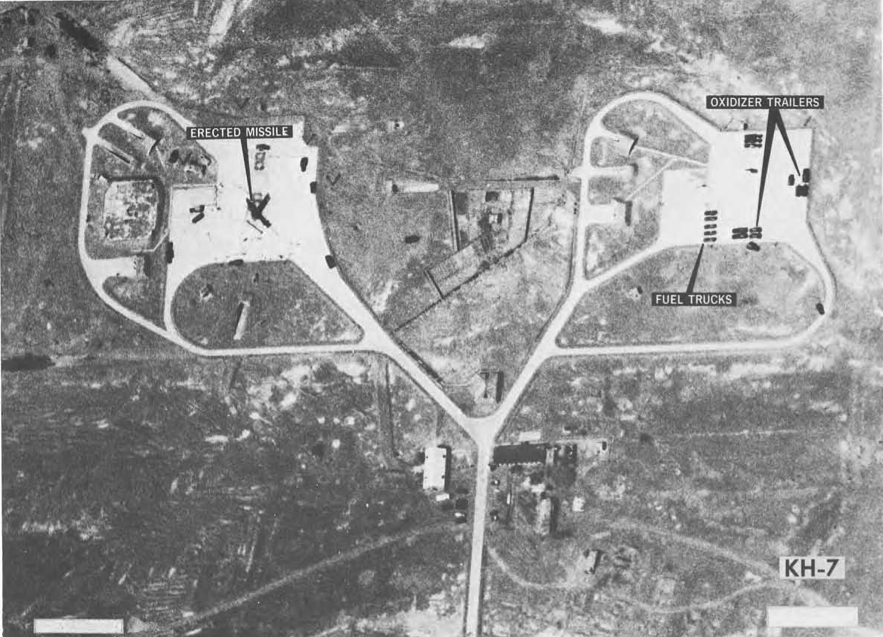
KH-7 satellite image of the facility in 1967.

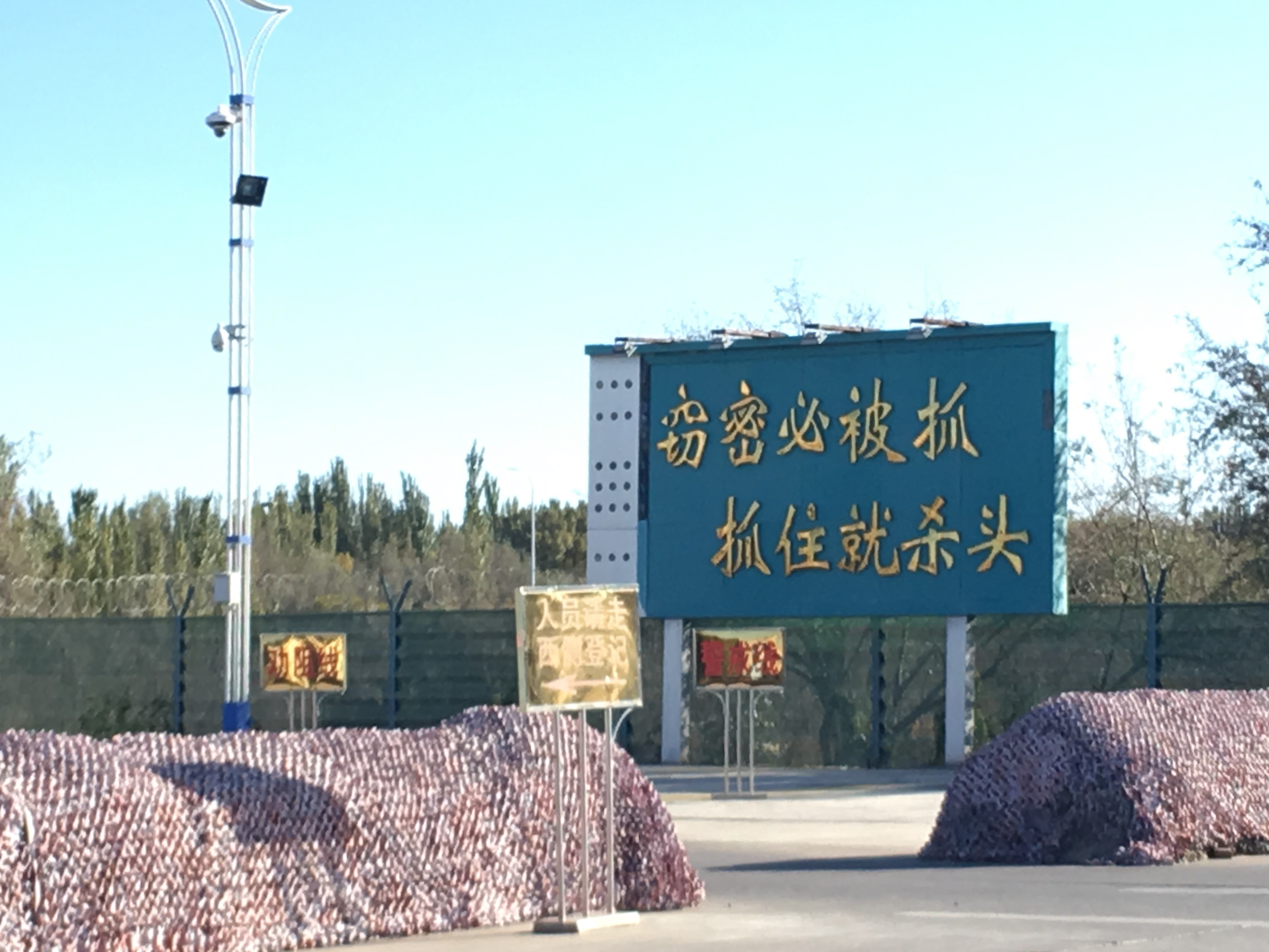
A warning board at the gate.

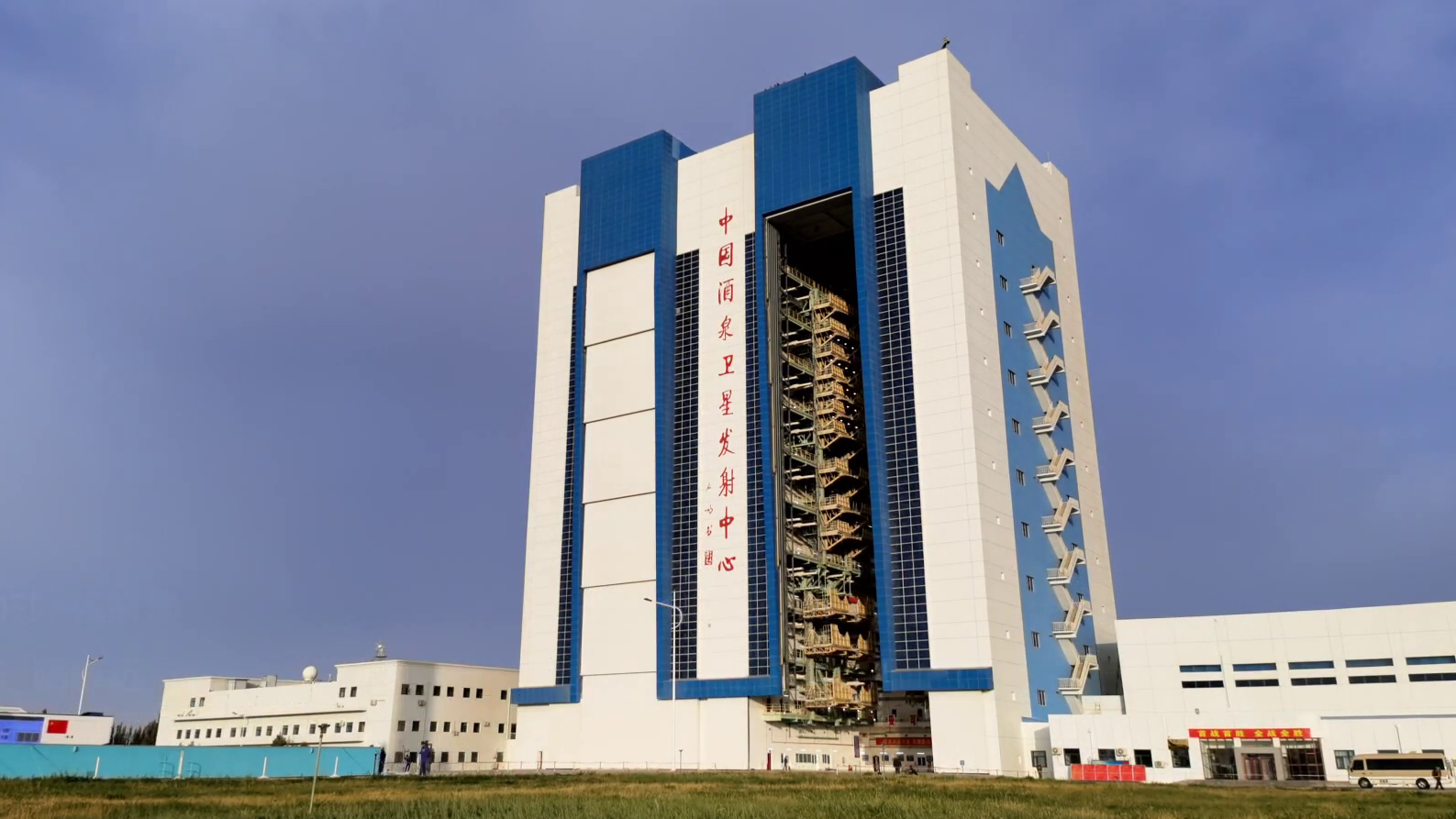
Launch Vehicle Vertical Assembly Building.

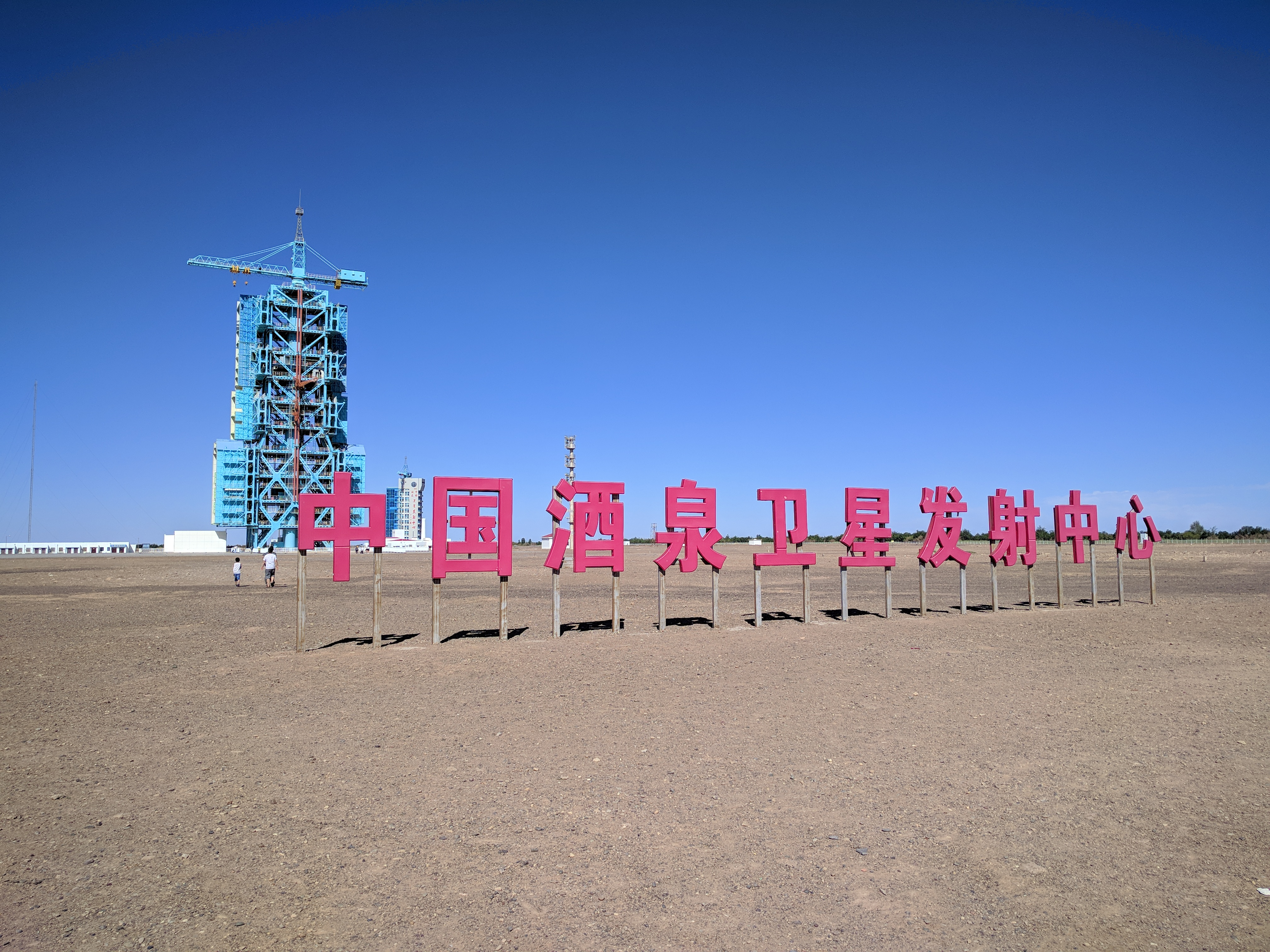
Tower 1 and 2 behind a sign.

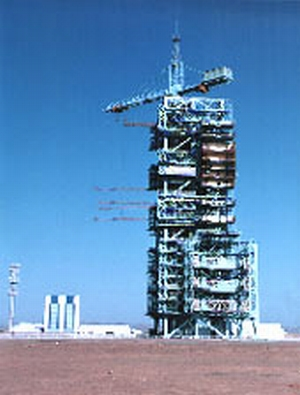
Launch tower.

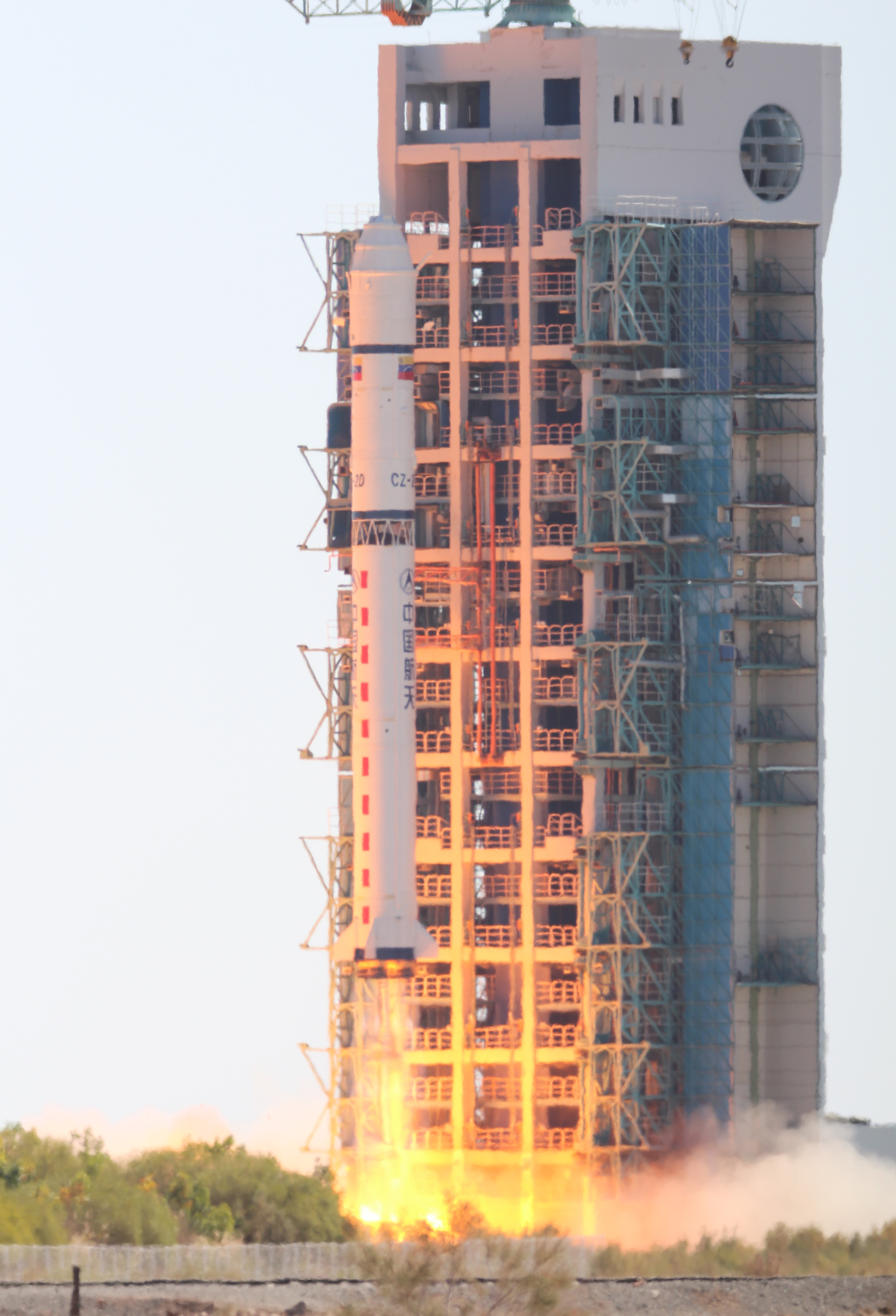
Launch of Long March 2D (VRSS-1 / Miranda).

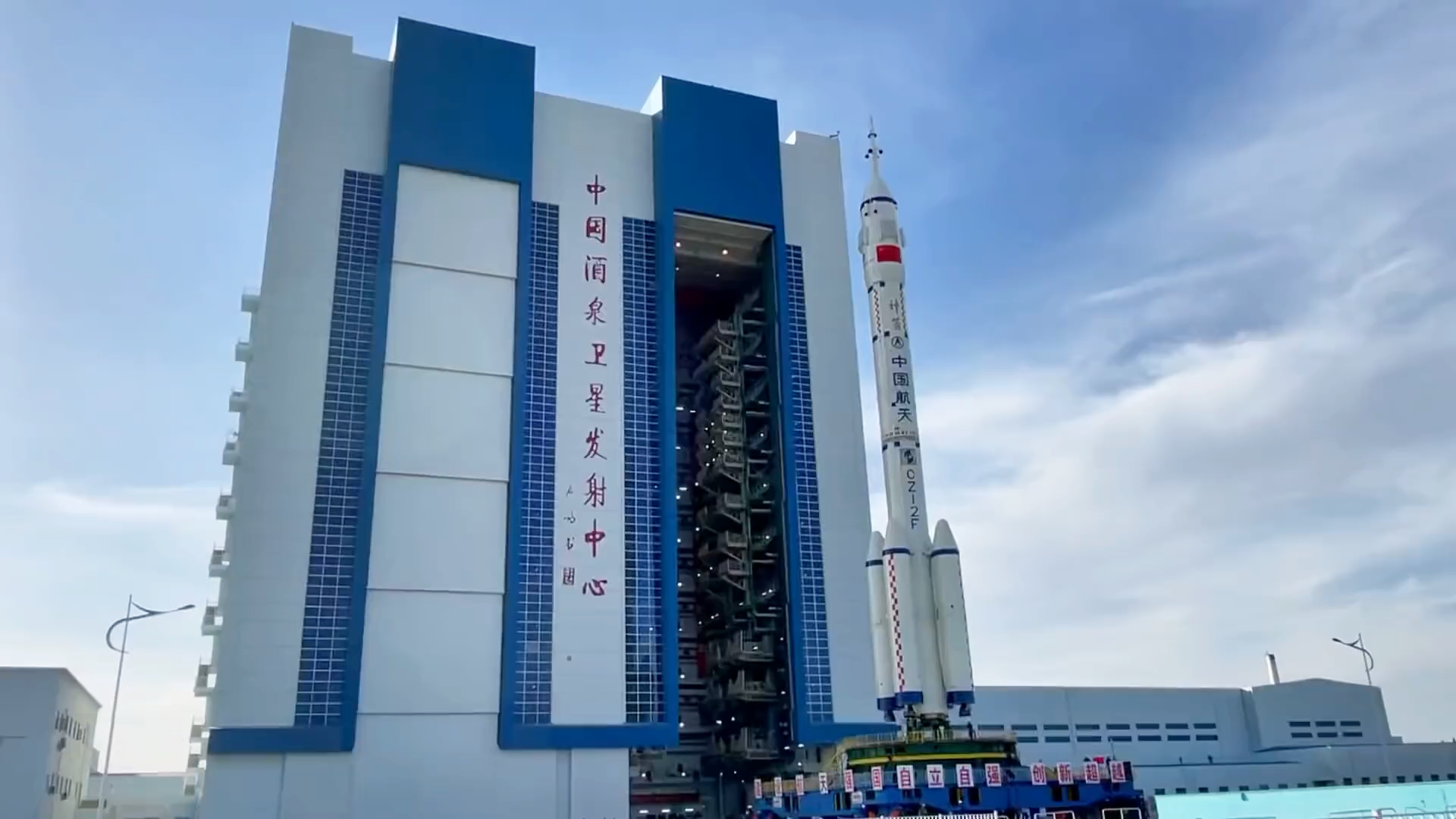
Roll out of Long March 2F (Shenzhou 12).

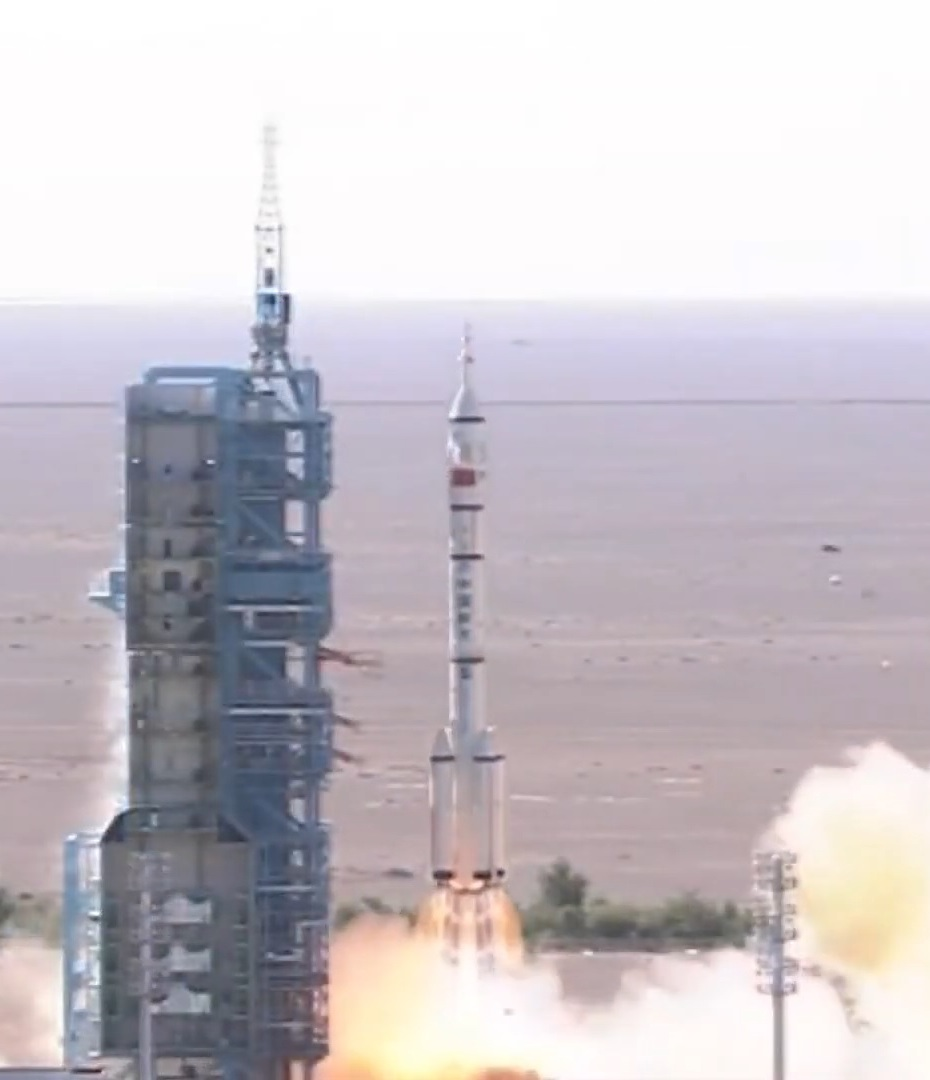
Launch of Long March 2F (Shenzhou 12).

== See also ==
- Chinese space program
- Taiyuan Satellite Launch Center
- Wenchang Satellite Launch Center
- Xichang Satellite Launch Center
- Hyperbola-1
