= Uncrewed spacecraft =

Spacecraft without people on board

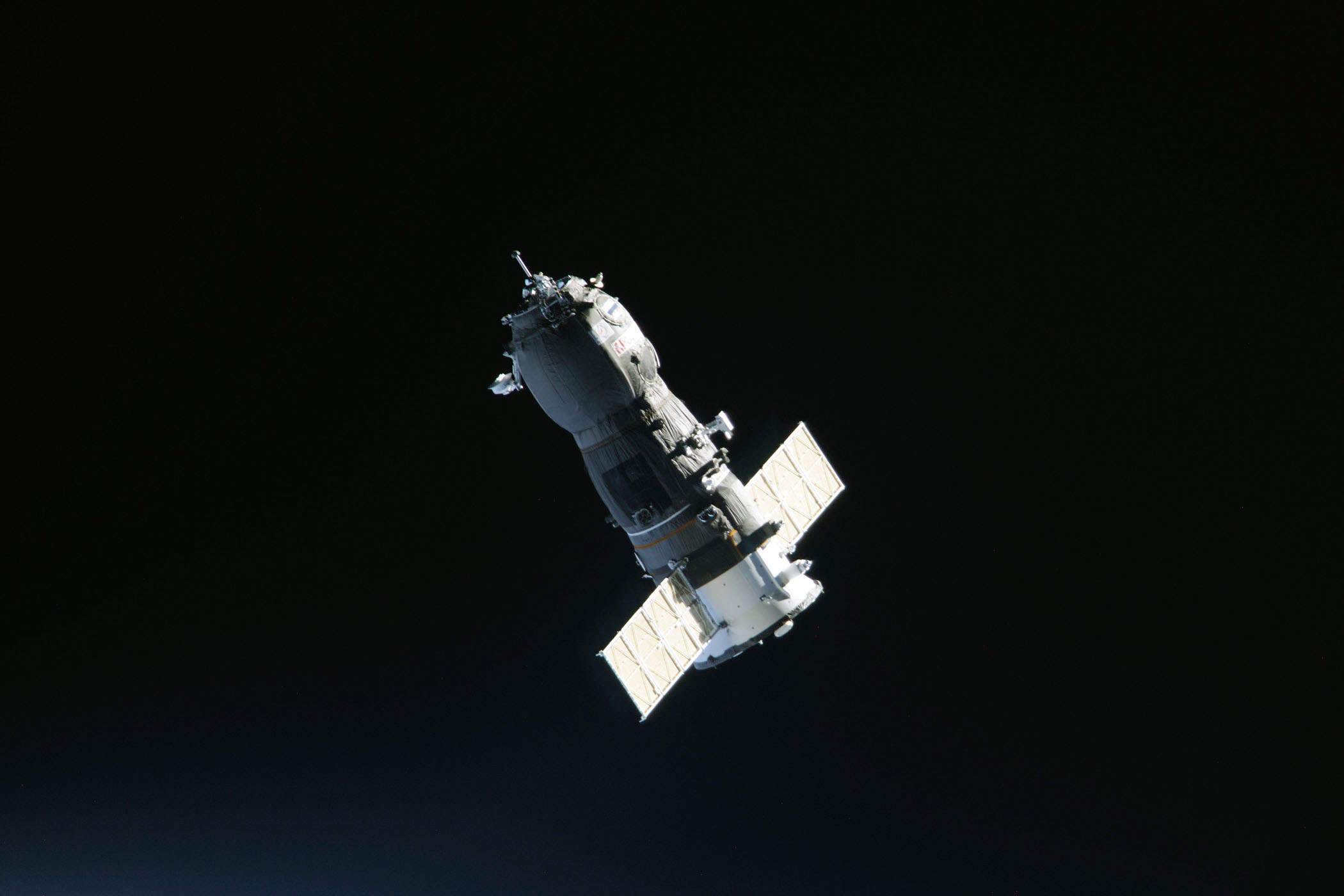
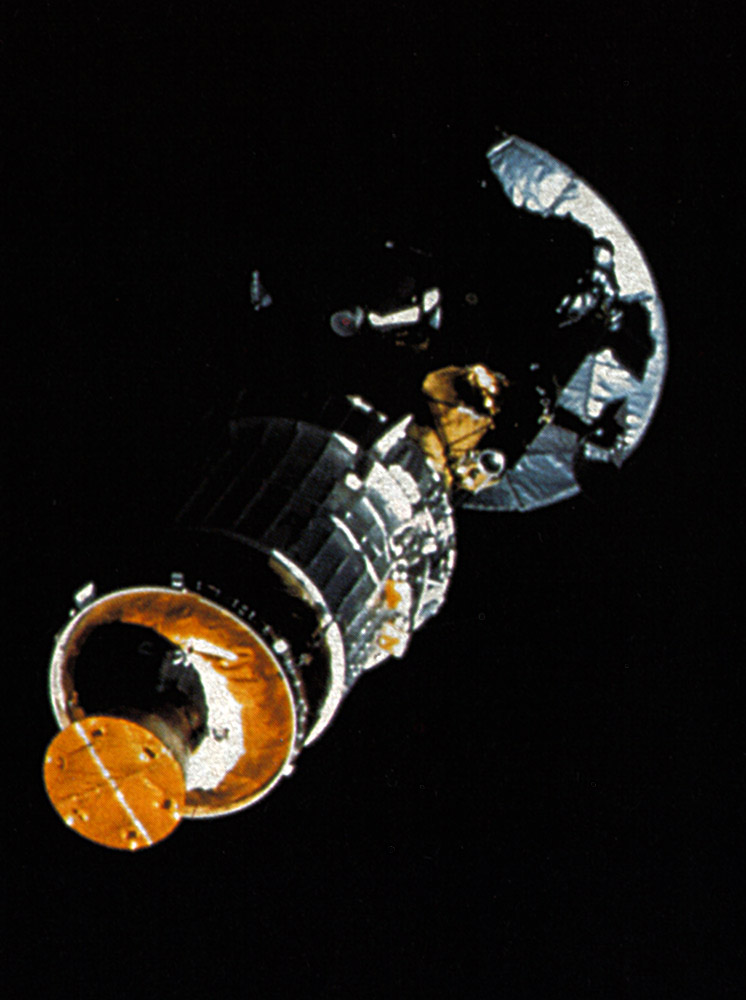
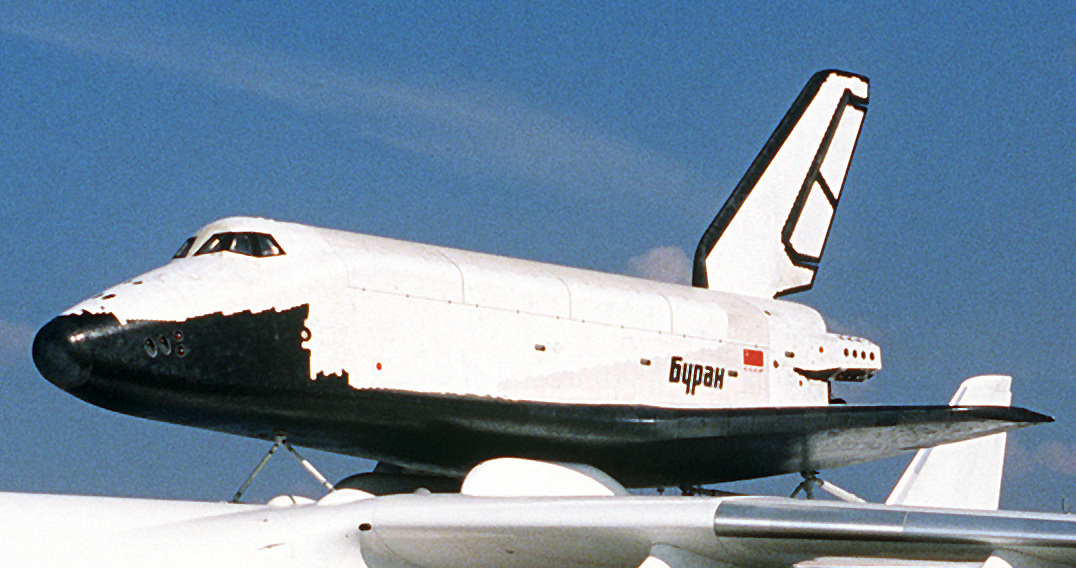
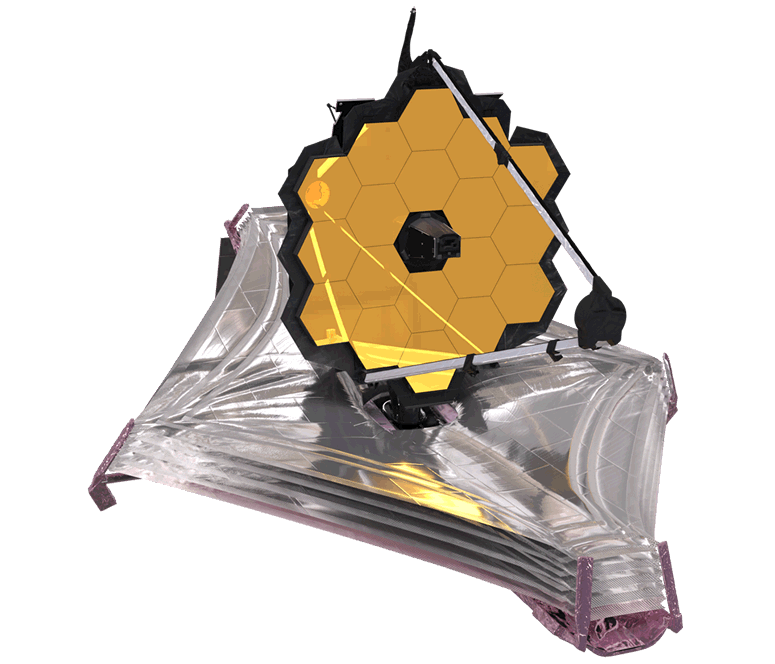
Top: The uncrewed resupply vessel Progress M-06M (left). Galileo space probe, prior to departure from Earth orbit in 1989 (right).
Bottom: Spaceplane Buran was launched, orbited Earth, and landed as an uncrewed spacecraft in 1988 (left). Model of James Webb Space Telescope (right).

Uncrewed spacecraft or robotic spacecraft are spacecraft without people on board. Uncrewed spacecraft may have varying levels of autonomy from human input, such as remote control, or remote guidance. They may also be autonomous, in which they have a pre-programmed list of operations that will be executed unless otherwise instructed. A robotic spacecraft for scientific measurements is often called a space probe or space observatory.

Many space missions are more suited to telerobotic rather than crewed operation, due to lower cost and risk factors. In addition, some planetary destinations such as Venus or the vicinity of Jupiter are too hostile for human survival, given current technology. Outer planets such as Saturn, Uranus, and Neptune are too distant to reach with current crewed spaceflight technology, so telerobotic probes are the only way to explore them. Telerobotics also allows exploration of regions that are vulnerable to contamination by Earth micro-organisms since spacecraft can be sterilized. Humans can not be sterilized in the same way as a spaceship, as they coexist with numerous micro-organisms, and these micro-organisms are also hard to contain within a spaceship or spacesuit.

The first uncrewed space mission was Sputnik, launched October 4, 1957 to orbit the Earth. Nearly all satellites, landers and rovers are robotic spacecraft. Not every uncrewed spacecraft is a robotic spacecraft; for example, a reflector ball is a non-robotic uncrewed spacecraft. Space missions where other animals but no humans are on-board are called uncrewed missions.

Many habitable spacecraft also have varying levels of robotic features. For example, the space stations Salyut 7 and Mir, and the International Space Station module Zarya, were capable of remote guided station-keeping and docking maneuvers with both resupply craft and new modules. Uncrewed resupply spacecraft are increasingly used for crewed space stations.

== History ==
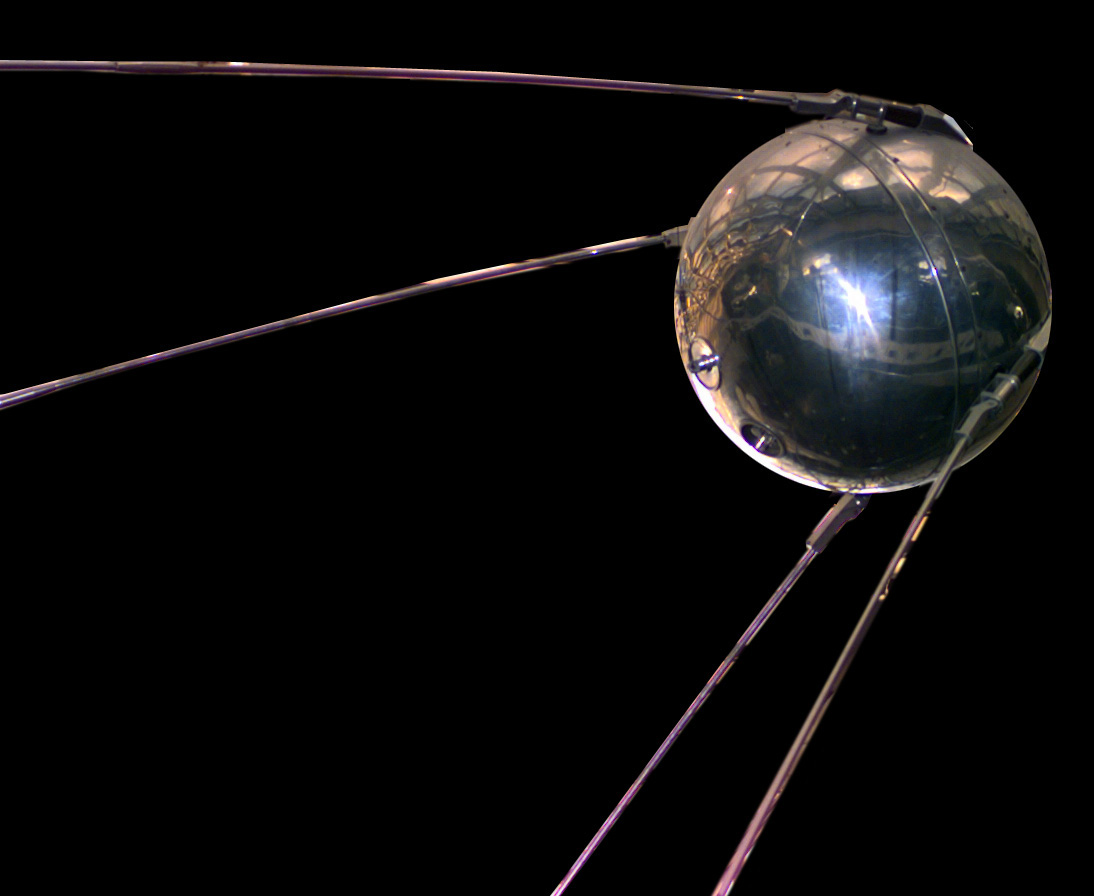
A replica of Sputnik 1 at the U.S. National Air and Space Museum

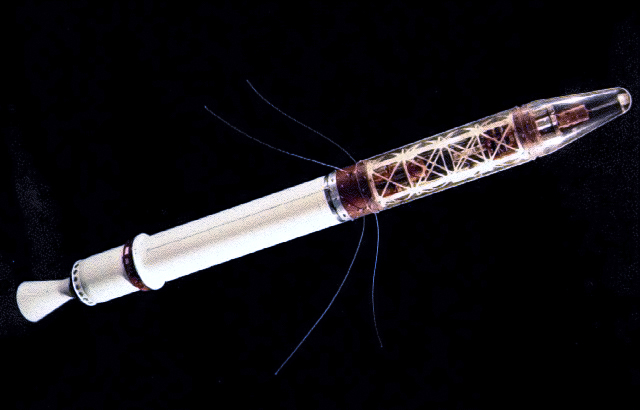
A replica of Explorer 1

The first robotic spacecraft was launched by the Soviet Union (USSR) on 22 July 1951, a suborbital flight carrying two dogs Dezik and Tsygan. Four other such flights were made through the fall of 1951.

The first artificial satellite, Sputnik 1, was put into a 215-by-939-kilometer (116 by 507 nmi) Earth orbit by the USSR on 4 October 1957. On 3 November 1957, the USSR orbited Sputnik 2. Weighing 113 kilograms (249 lb), Sputnik 2 carried the first animal into orbit, the dog Laika. Since the satellite was not designed to detach from its launch vehicle's upper stage, the total mass in orbit was 508.3 kilograms (1,121 lb).

In a close race with the Soviets, the United States launched its first artificial satellite, Explorer 1, into a 357-by-2,543-kilometre (193 by 1,373 nmi) orbit on 31 January 1958. Explorer I was an 205-centimetre (80.75 in) long by 15.2-centimetre (6.00 in) diameter cylinder weighing 14.0 kilograms (30.8 lb), compared to Sputnik 1, a 58-centimeter (23 in) sphere which weighed 83.6 kilograms (184 lb). Explorer 1 carried sensors which confirmed the existence of the Van Allen belts, a major scientific discovery at the time, while Sputnik 1 carried no scientific sensors. On 17 March 1958, the US orbited its second satellite, Vanguard 1, which was about the size of a grapefruit, and which remains in a 670-by-3,850-kilometre (360 by 2,080 nmi) orbit as of 2016.

The first attempted lunar probe was the Luna E-1 No.1, launched on 23 September 1958. The goal of a lunar probe repeatedly failed until 4 January 1959 when Luna 1 orbited around the Moon and then the Sun.

The success of these early missions began a race between the US and the USSR to outdo each other with increasingly ambitious probes. Mariner 2 was the first probe to study another planet, revealing Venus' extremely hot temperature to scientists in 1962, while the Soviet Venera 4 was the first atmospheric probe to study Venus. Mariner 4's 1965 Mars flyby snapped the first images of its cratered surface, which the Soviets responded to a few months later with images from on its surface from Luna 9. In 1967, America's Surveyor 3 gathered information about the Moon's surface that would prove crucial to the Apollo 11 mission that landed humans on the Moon two years later.

The first interstellar probe was Voyager 1, launched 5 September 1977. It entered interstellar space on 25 August 2012, followed by its twin Voyager 2 on 5 November 2018.

Nine other countries have successfully launched satellites using their own launch vehicles: France (1965), Japan and China (1970), the United Kingdom (1971), India (1980), Israel (1988), Iran (2009), North Korea (2012), and South Korea (2022).

== Design ==
In spacecraft design, the United States Air Force considers a vehicle to consist of the mission payload and the bus (or platform). The bus provides physical structure, thermal control, electrical power, attitude control and telemetry, tracking and commanding. JPL divides the "flight system" of a spacecraft into subsystems. These include:

=== Structure ===
The physical backbone structure, which

- provides overall mechanical integrity of the spacecraft
- ensures spacecraft components are supported and can withstand launch loads

=== Data handling ===
This is sometimes referred to as the command and data subsystem. It is often responsible for:

- command sequence storage
- maintaining the spacecraft clock
- collecting and reporting spacecraft telemetry data (e.g. spacecraft health)
- collecting and reporting mission data (e.g. photographic images)

=== Attitude determination and control ===
This system is mainly responsible for the correct spacecraft's orientation in space (attitude) despite external disturbance-gravity gradient effects, magnetic-field torques, solar radiation and aerodynamic drag; in addition it may be required to reposition movable parts, such as antennas and solar arrays.

=== Entry, descent, and landing ===
Integrated sensing incorporates an image transformation algorithm to interpret the immediate imagery land data, perform a real-time detection and avoidance of terrain hazards that may impede safe landing, and increase the accuracy of landing at a desired site of interest using landmark localization techniques. Integrated sensing completes these tasks by relying on pre-recorded information and cameras to understand its location and determine its position and whether it is correct or needs to make any corrections (localization). The cameras are also used to detect any possible hazards whether it is increased fuel consumption or it is a physical hazard such as a poor landing spot in a crater or cliff side that would make landing very not ideal (hazard assessment).

=== Landing on hazardous terrain ===
In planetary exploration missions involving robotic spacecraft, there are three key parts in the processes of landing on the surface of the planet to ensure a safe and successful landing. This process includes an entry into the planetary gravity field and atmosphere, a descent through that atmosphere towards an intended/targeted region of scientific value, and a safe landing that guarantees the integrity of the instrumentation on the craft is preserved. While the robotic spacecraft is going through those parts, it must also be capable of estimating its position compared to the surface in order to ensure reliable control of itself and its ability to maneuver well. The robotic spacecraft must also efficiently perform hazard assessment and trajectory adjustments in real time to avoid hazards. To achieve this, the robotic spacecraft requires accurate knowledge of where the spacecraft is located relative to the surface (localization), what may pose as hazards from the terrain (hazard assessment), and where the spacecraft should presently be headed (hazard avoidance). Without the capability for operations for localization, hazard assessment, and avoidance, the robotic spacecraft becomes unsafe and can easily enter dangerous situations such as surface collisions, undesirable fuel consumption levels, and/or unsafe maneuvers.

=== Telecommunications ===
Components in the telecommunications subsystem include radio antennas, transmitters and receivers. These may be used to communicate with ground stations on Earth, or with other spacecraft.

=== Electrical power ===
The supply of electric power on spacecraft generally come from photovoltaic (solar) cells or from a radioisotope thermoelectric generator. Other components of the subsystem include batteries for storing power and distribution circuitry that connects components to the power sources.

=== Temperature control and protection from the environment ===
Spacecraft are often protected from temperature fluctuations with insulation. Some spacecraft use mirrors and sunshades for additional protection from solar heating. They also often need shielding from micrometeoroids and orbital debris.

=== Propulsion ===
Spacecraft propulsion is a method that allows a spacecraft to travel through space by generating thrust to push it forward. However, there is not one universally used propulsion system: monopropellant, bipropellant, ion propulsion, etc. Each propulsion system generates thrust in different ways with each system having advantages and disadvantages.

Most spacecraft propulsion today is based on rocket engines. The general idea behind rocket engines is that when an oxidizer meets the fuel source, there is explosive release of energy and heat at high speeds, which propels the spacecraft forward. This happens due to one basic principle known as Newton's third law. According to Newton, "to every action there is an equal and opposite reaction." As the energy and heat is being released from the back of the spacecraft, gas particles are pushed that allow the spacecraft to propel forward. The main reason behind the use of rocket engines today is because rockets are the most powerful form of propulsion.

==== Monopropellant ====
For a propulsion system to work, there is usually an oxidizer line and a fuel line. This way, the spacecraft propulsion is controlled. But in a monopropellant propulsion, there is no need for an oxidizer line and only the system only requires the fuel line. This works due to the oxidizer being chemically bonded into the fuel molecule itself. But for the propulsion system to be controlled, the combustion of the fuel can only occur due to the presence of a catalyst. This is advantageous due to making the rocket engine lighter, less expensive, easy to control, and more reliable. But, the disadvantage is that the chemical is dangerous to manufacture, store, and transport.

==== Bipropellant ====
A bipropellant propulsion system is a rocket engine that uses a liquid propellant. This means both the oxidizer and fuel line are in liquid states. This system is unique because it requires no ignition system, the two liquids would spontaneously combust as soon as they come into contact with each other thus producing the propulsion to push the spacecraft forward. The main benefit for having this technology is that these kinds of liquids have relatively high density, which allow the volume of the propellent tank to be small, therefore increasing space efficacy. The downside is the same as that of monopropellant propulsion system: dangerous to manufacture, store, and transport.

==== Ion ====
An ion propulsion system is a type of engine that generates thrust by the means of electron bombardment or the acceleration of ions. By shooting high-energy electrons to a propellant atom (neutrally charged), it removes electrons from the propellant atom resulting in the propellant atom becoming positively charged. The positively charged ions, running at high voltages, are guided through positively charged grids that contain thousands of precisely aligned holes. The aligned positively charged ions accelerate through a negatively charged accelerator grid that further increases their speed, up to 40 kilometres per second (90,000 mph). The momentum of these ions provides the thrust to propel the spacecraft. The advantage of having this kind of propulsion is that it is incredibly efficient in maintaining constant velocity, which is needed for deep-space travel. However, the amount of thrust produced is extremely low and it needs substantial electrical power to operate.

=== Mechanical devices ===
Mechanical components often need to be moved for deployment after launch or prior to landing. In addition to the use of motors, many one-time movements are controlled by pyrotechnic devices.

== Robotic vs. uncrewed spacecraft ==
Robotic spacecraft are specifically designed system for a specific hostile environment. Due to their specification for a particular environment, it varies greatly in complexity and capabilities. While an uncrewed spacecraft is a spacecraft without personnel or crew and is operated by automatic (proceeds with an action without human intervention) or remote control (with human intervention). The term 'uncrewed spacecraft' does not imply that the spacecraft is robotic.

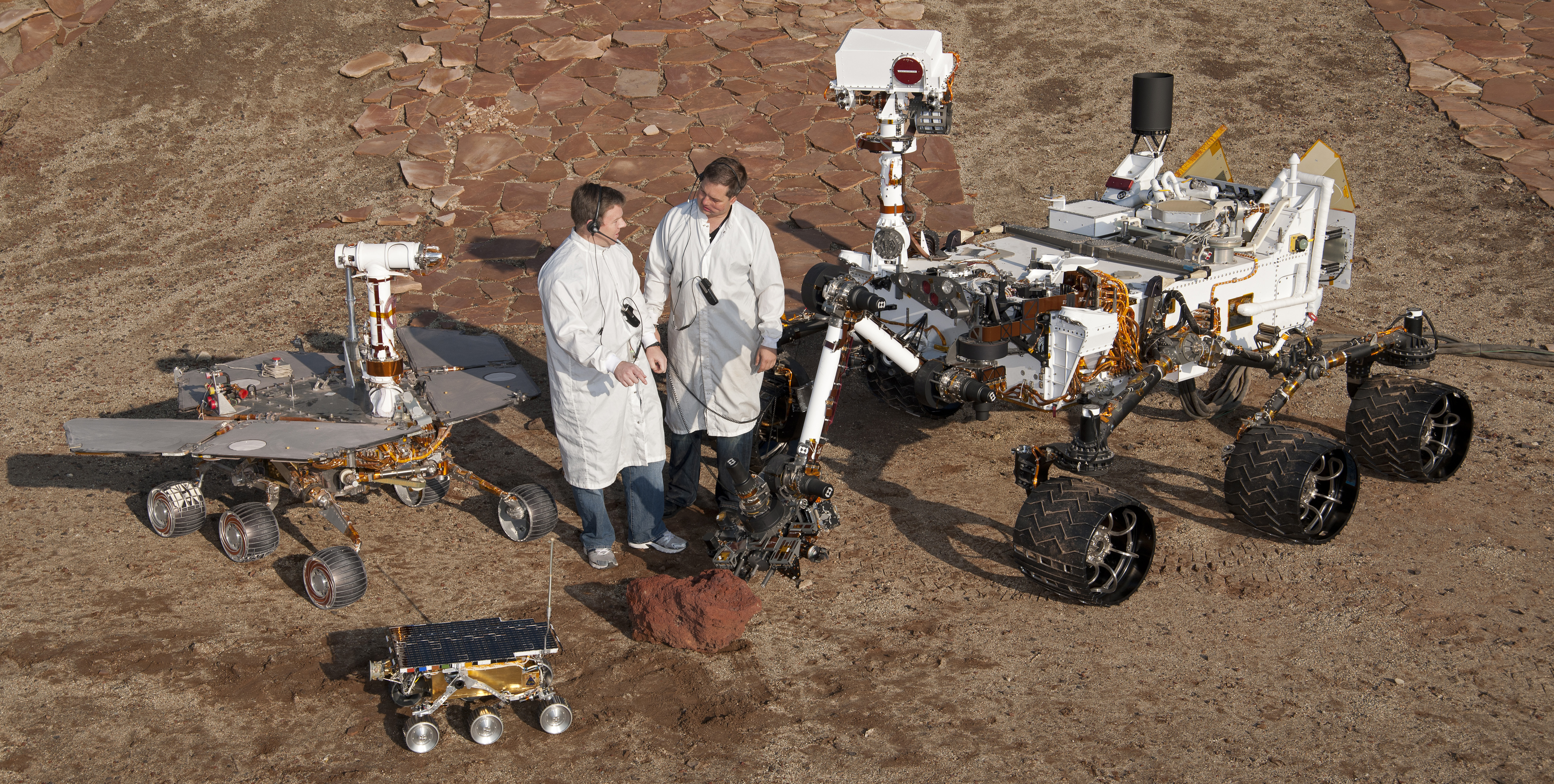
Robotic rover

Robotic spacecraft use telemetry to radio back to Earth acquired data and vehicle status information. Although generally referred to as "remotely controlled" or "telerobotic", the earliest orbital spacecraft – such as Sputnik 1 and Explorer 1 – did not receive control signals from Earth. Soon after these first spacecraft, command systems were developed to allow remote control from the ground. Increased autonomy is important for distant probes where the light travel time prevents rapid decision and control from Earth. Newer probes such as Cassini–Huygens and the Mars Exploration Rovers are highly autonomous and use on-board computers to operate independently for extended periods of time.

== Space probes ==
A space probe is a robotic spacecraft that does not orbit Earth, but instead explores the outer space. Space probes have different sets of scientific instruments on board. A space probe may approach the Moon; travel through interplanetary space; flyby, orbit, or land on other planetary bodies; or enter interstellar space. Space probes send collected data to Earth. Space probes can also gather materials from its target and return it to Earth.

Once a probe has left the vicinity of Earth, its trajectory will likely take it along an orbit around the Sun similar to the Earth's orbit. To reach another planet, the simplest practical method is a Hohmann transfer orbit. More complex techniques, such as gravitational slingshots, can be more fuel-efficient, though they may require the probe to spend more time in transit. Some high Delta-V missions (such as those with high inclination changes) can only be performed using gravitational slingshots. A technique using very little propulsion, but requiring a considerable amount of time, is to follow a trajectory on the Interplanetary Transport Network.

== Space telescopes ==
A space telescope or space observatory is a telescope in outer space used to observe astronomical objects. Space telescopes avoid the filtering and distortion of electromagnetic radiation which they observe, and avoid light pollution which ground-based observatories encounter. They are divided into two types: satellites which map the entire sky (astronomical survey), and satellites which focus on selected astronomical objects or parts of the sky and beyond. Space telescopes are distinct from Earth imaging satellites, which point toward Earth for satellite imaging, applied for weather analysis, reconnaissance, and other types of information gathering.

== Cargo spacecraft ==
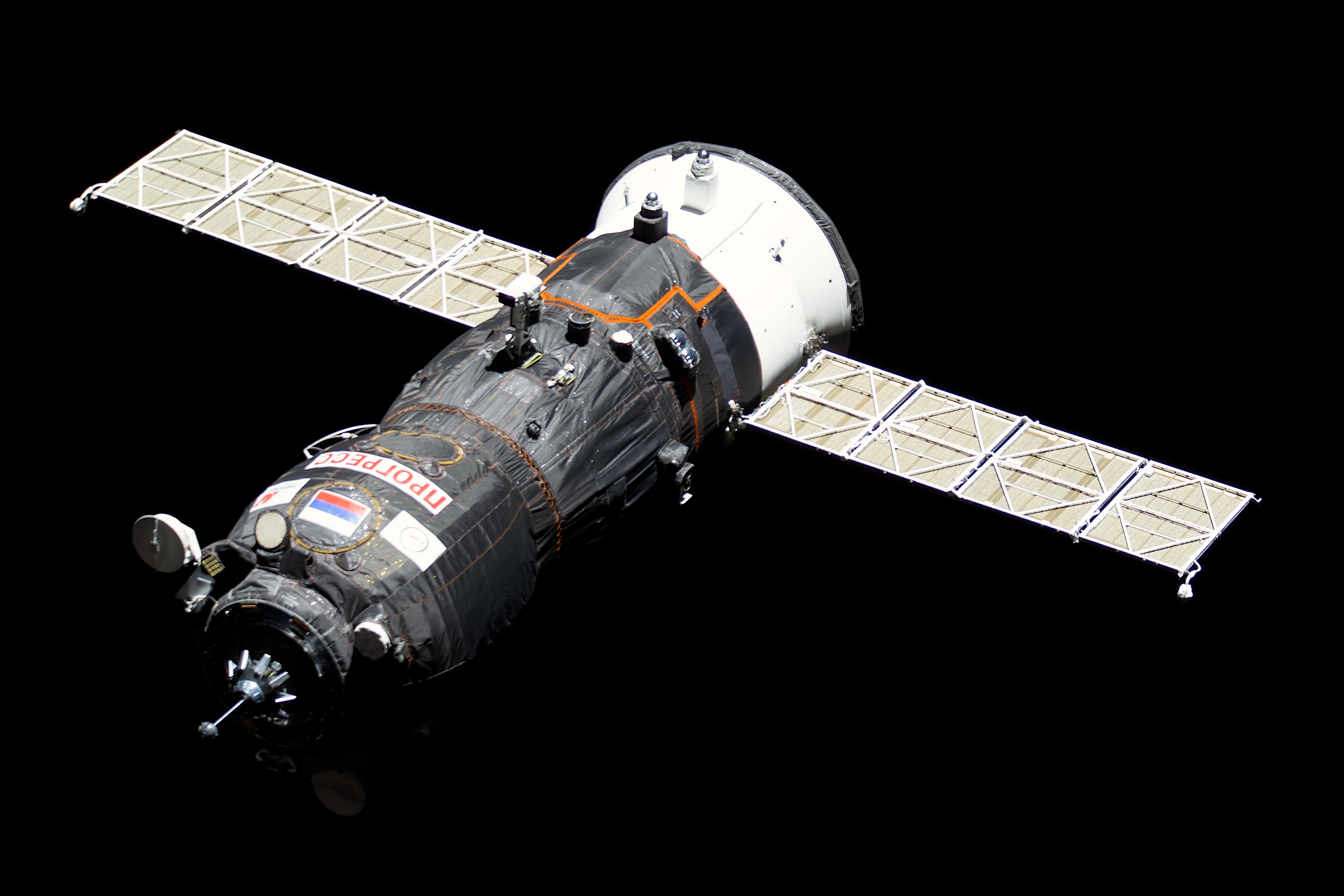
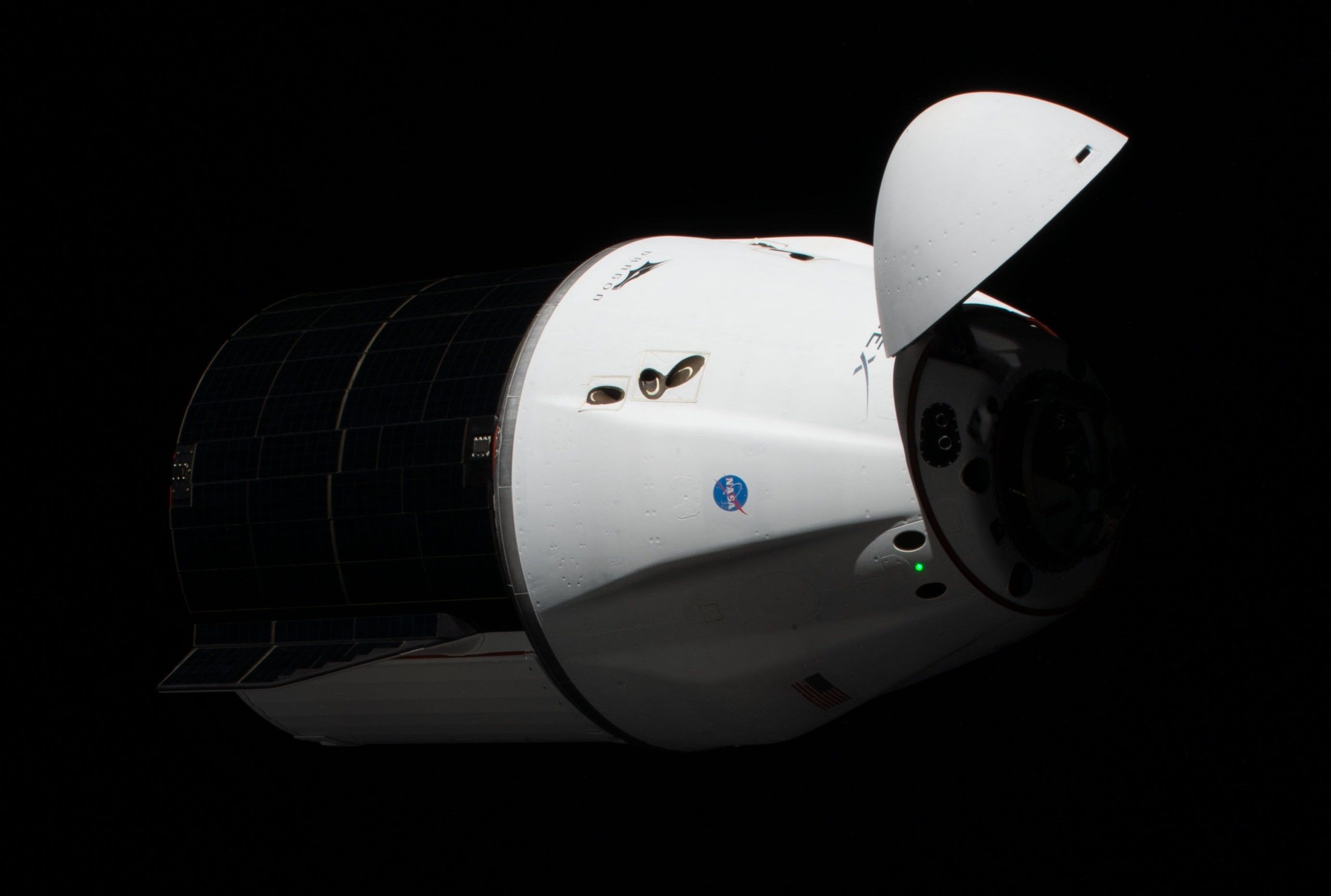
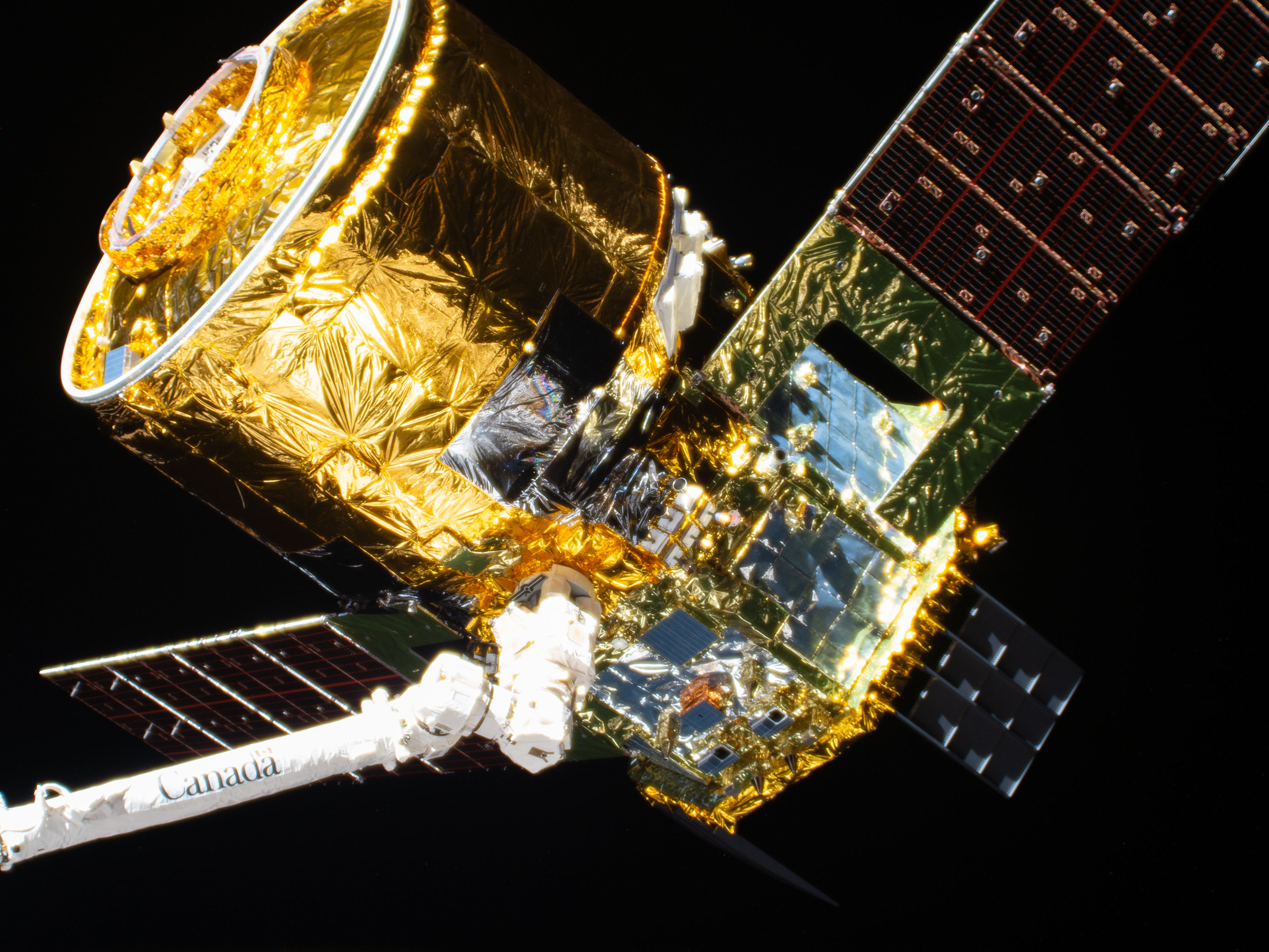
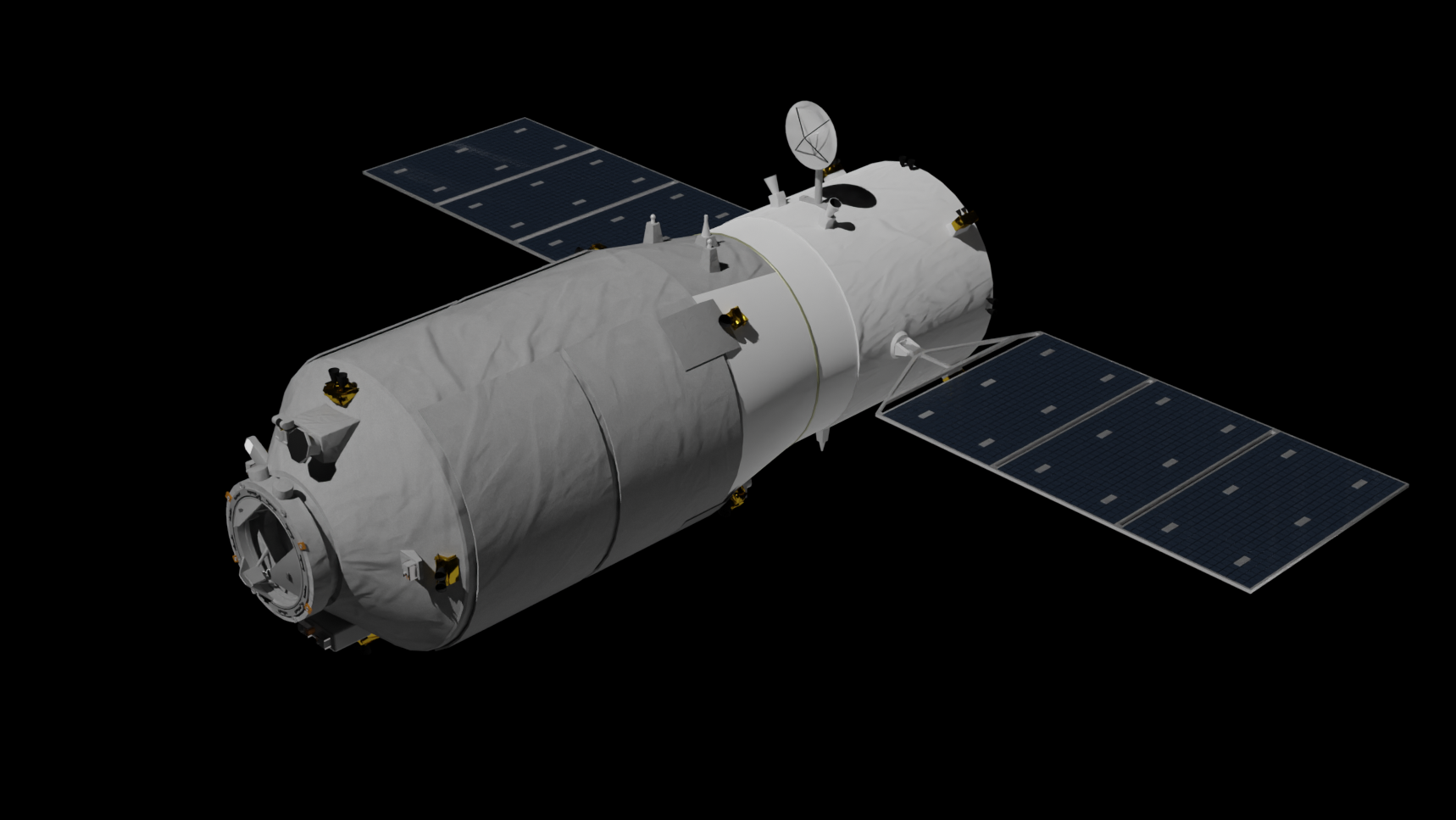
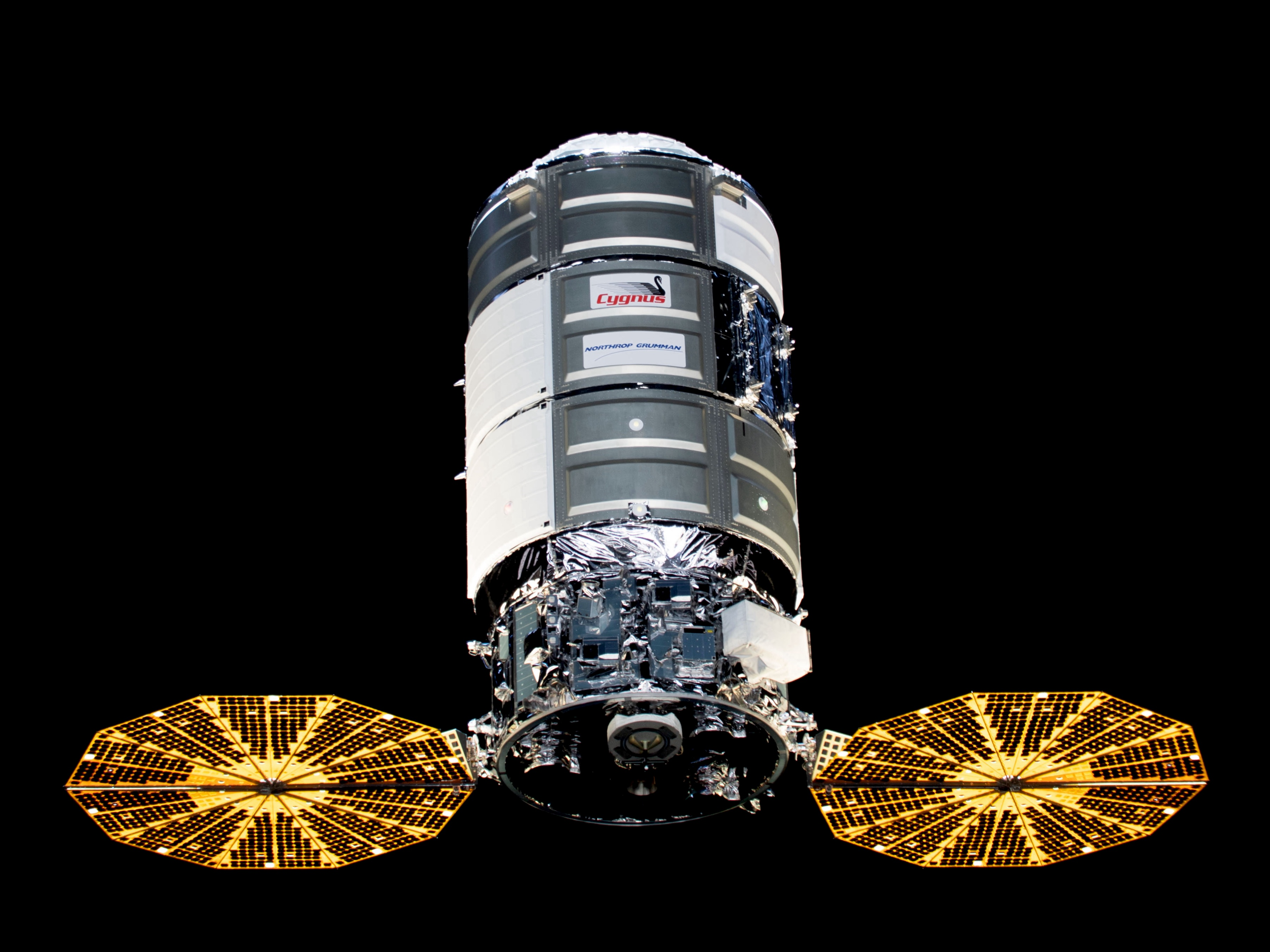
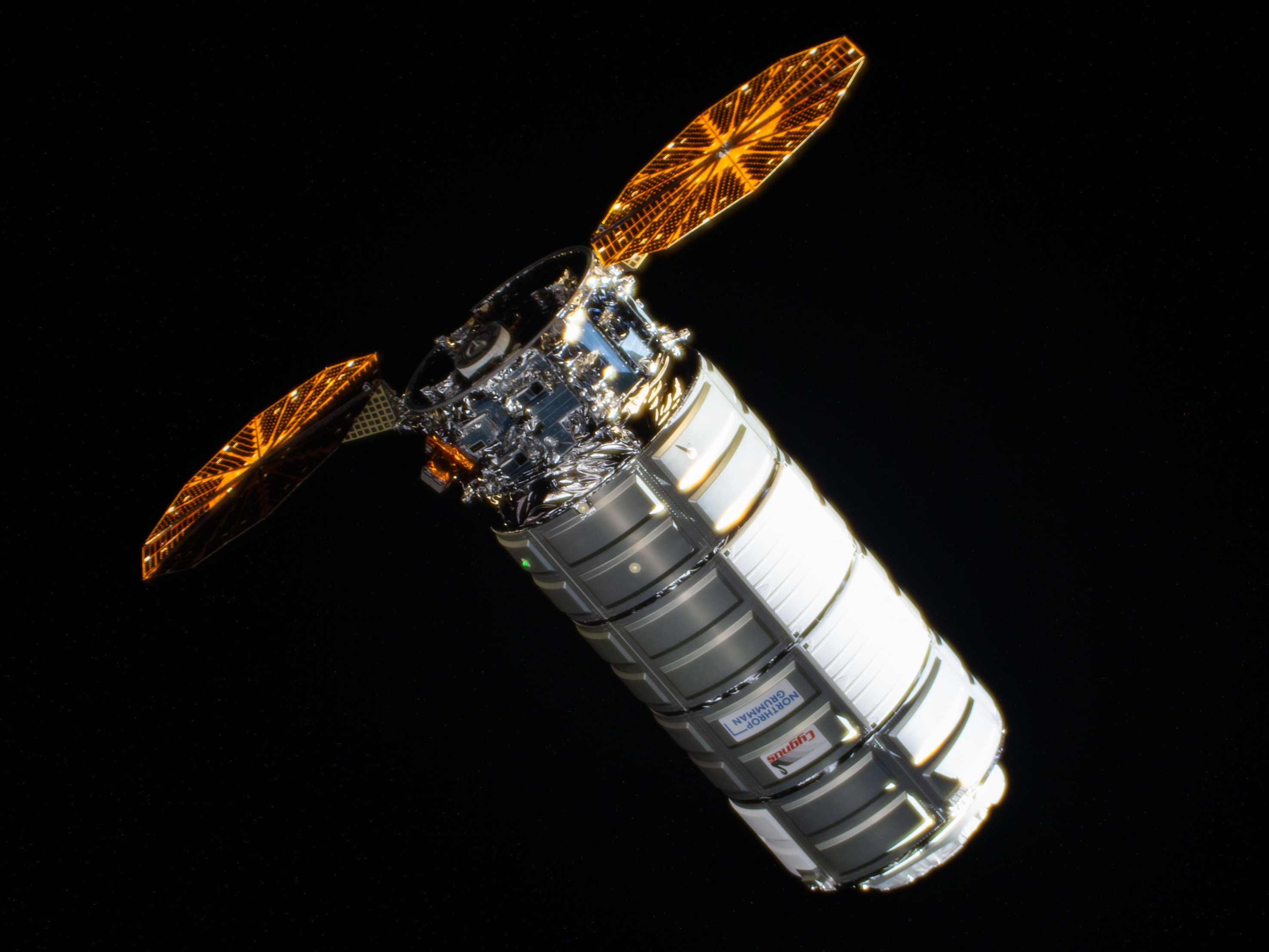
The six currently active space station cargo vehicles. Clockwise from top left: Progress, Cargo Dragon 2, HTV-X, Cygnus XL, Enhanced Cygnus, Tianzhou

Cargo or resupply spacecraft are robotic vehicles designed to transport supplies, such as food, propellant, and equipment, to crewed space stations. This distinguishes them from space probes, which are primarily focused on scientific exploration.

Automated cargo spacecraft have been servicing space stations since 1978, supporting missions like Salyut 6, Salyut 7, Mir, the International Space Station (ISS), and the Tiangong space station.

Currently, the ISS relies on four types of cargo spacecraft: the Japanese HTV-X, the Russian Progress, along with the American Cargo Dragon 2, and Cygnus. The European Automated Transfer Vehicle was previously used between 2008 and 2015. China's Tiangong space station is solely supplied by the Tianzhou.

=== Future cargo spacecraft ===
The American Dream Chaser is under development from 2004. As of 2025, its first orbital test flight is expected in 2026, but it is no longer contracted to resupply missions to the ISS.

Since 2023, ESA has been pursuing the LEO Cargo Return Service initiative to develop one or more cargo spacecraft capable of returning to Earth.

China is developing two new cargo spacecraft to complement the Tianzhou in supporting the Tiangong space station. Qingzhou is a small pressurized spacecraft with no heat shield, while Haolong is a reusable spaceplane.

== See also ==
- Beacon mode service
- Geosynchronous satellite
- Human spaceflight
- List of passive satellites
- Timeline of Solar System exploration
