= Ceres-2 =

Chinese launch vehicle

- Manufacturer: Galactic Energy
- Country of origin: China

Size
- Diameter: 3.35 m (11.0 ft)
- Stages: 4

Capacity

Payload to Low Earth orbit
- Mass: 1,600 kg (3,500 lb) (500 km LEO)

Associated rockets
- Comparable: kuaizhou-11, Jielong 3, Lijian-1

Launch history
- Status: Active
- Launch sites: JSLC
- Total launches: 2
- Success(es): 1
- Failure: 1
- First flight: 17 January 2026
- Last flight: 6 November 2026

First stage
- Powered by: 1 Solid
- Propellant: Solid

Second stage
- Powered by: 1 Solid
- Propellant: Solid

Third stage
- Powered by: 1 Solid
- Propellant: Solid

Fourth stage – Advanced liquid upper stage

Ceres-2 (Chinese: 谷神星二号; pinyin: Gǔshénxīng Er-hào; lit. 'Ceres-2'), is a four-stage rocket manufactured and operated by Galactic Energy, the first three stages use solid-propellant rocket motors and the final stage uses a hydrazine propulsion system. The rocket has a diameter of 3.35 metres and it can deliver 1,600 kg (880 lb) to a 500 km low Earth orbit, or 1,300 kg to a 500 km Sun-synchronous orbit. Ceres-2 is a development from the earlier and smaller Ceres-1 launcher.

The first launch of Ceres-2 on 17 January 2026 failed to reach orbit; however the second launch on 6 November 2026 was successful.

== Launch statistics summary ==
- Failure
- Partial failure
- Success
- Planned

== Launches ==
Rocket & Serial	Date	Payload	Orbit	Launch site	Outcome	Remarks
Ceres-2 Y1	17 January 2026	unknown	SSO	Jiuquan	Failure	First flight of Ceres-2.
Ceres-2 Y3	6 November 2026; 23:37	Guanlan, Yunyao-1 28, North University of China No. 1, Juntian-1 06A	SSO	Jiuquan	Success	First successful flight of Ceres-2.
