= CAS Space =

Chinese space launch enterprise

Guangzhou Zhongke Aerospace Exploration Technology Co., Ltd.
- Trade name: CAS Space
- Native name: 广州中科宇航探索技术有限公司
- Industry: Launch service provider
- Founded: April 2018; 8 years ago in Beijing, China
- Headquarters: Guangzhou, Guangdong, China
- Owner: Chinese Academy of Sciences
- Website: www.cas-space.com

CAS Space (Chinese: 中科宇航) is a Chinese commercial space launch provider based in Guangzhou. It was founded in 2018 and majority owned by the Chinese Academy of Sciences.

== History ==
CAS Space was founded in Beijing, but the company is now headquartered in Guangzhou, China, while its Beijing location continues to be its primary R&D center. The company has constructed its dedicated launch pad and facilities at the JSLC. The launch pad is considered the first launch pad in China built for commercial use. The company has multiple subsidiaries, including a Guangzhou-based subsidiary responsible for the operation of its aerospace technology and industry base, and a Xi'an-based subsidiary for propulsion system.

CAS Space aims to materialize research projects from the Chinese Academy of Sciences and is dedicated to space exploration, research, and providing launch services. The company is currently developing the Kinetica rocket family. The enterprise's motto is "Go above and beyond," or "无畏向上 无限可能" as it is publicized in Chinese.

== Rockets ==
=== Kinetica 1 ===
CAS Space's first solid-fuel launch vehicle Kinetica 1 (Lijian-1, PR-1) is 30 m (98 ft) tall, 2.65 m (8 ft 8 in) in diameter and weighs 135 t (149 tons). It consists of four solid fuel stages. The Kinetica 1 is capable of lifting 1.5 t (1.65 tons) to SSO at an altitude of 500 km or 2 t (2.20 tons) to LEO.

=== Kinetica 2, and 2H ===
Kinetica 2 is a medium-lift liquid-propellant rocket. It was scheduled for its debut flight in 2025, with plans for the first stage and booster recovery by 2027. Using kerosene and liquid oxygen propellant. At liftoff the vehicle is propelled by three similar rocket stages strapped together side-by-side. The core stages have a diameter of 3.35 meters and a height of 53 meters. It is capable of delivering payloads up to 7.8 tons to SSO at 500 km altitude and 12 tons to LEO.

The Kinetica 2H variant is capable of delivering payloads up to 12 tons to SSO at an altitude of 500 km.

=== Kinetica 3 ===
The Kinetica 3, a reusable vehicle, will be capable of delivering payloads up to 20 tons to SSO at an altitude of 500 km.

=== Space Tourism Vehicle ===
In August 2021, CAS Space announced that it was developing a single-stage sub-orbital space tourism vehicle similar to Blue Origin's New Shepard rocket. The vehicle, consisting of a booster and capsule, would be powered by five Xuanyuan engines. An uncrewed demonstration flight is expected to take place in 2022, followed by a full-fledged uncrewed suborbital flight in 2023, with tourism service set to begin in 2024. The timeline for achieving mature, round-trip suborbital space tourism has been extended to 2030.

== Launches ==
=== Kinetica 1 ===
Flight number	Serial number	Date (UTC)	Launch site	Payload	Orbit	Result	Note
1	Y1	27 July 2022; 04:12	LS-130, JSLC	SATech 01; Dianci Zuzhuang Shiyan × 2 GNSS-R; Jinan-1; Nanyue Science Satellite	SSO	Success	Maiden flight of Kinetica 1
2	Y2	7 June 2023; 04:10	LS-130, JSLC	Shiyan 24A/B; Fucheng-1; Xi'an Hangtou-8; CXPD (X Shexian Pianzheng Lifang); Tianyi 26; 20 undisclosed satellites	SSO	Success	
3	Y3	23 January 2024; 04:03	LS-130, JSLC	Taijing-1-03; Taijing-2-02; Taijing-2-04; Taijing-3-02; Taijing-4-03	SSO	Success	
4	Y4	24 September 2024; 23:33	LS-130, JSLC	Zhongke-01/02; Jilin-1 SAR-01A; Yunyao-21/22	SSO	Success	
5	Y5	11 November 2024; 04:03	LS-130, JSLC	Shiyan-26 A, B, C Jilin-1 Gaofen-05B; Jilin-1 Pingtai-02A 03; Yunyao-1 31-36; Xiguang-1 04, 05; OmanSat 1 Tianyan-24	SSO	Success	
6	Y6	27 December 2024; 01:03	LS-130, JSLC	Dier-3 (B300-L01); Yunyao-1 × 6 Yinglong 1 Yangwang 2 Yixian A CASAA-Sat	SSO	Failure	Third stage instability.
7	Y7	21 May 2025; 04:05	LS-130, JSLC	Taijing-3 04; Taijing-4 02A; Xingrui-11; Xingjiyuan-1; Lifangti-108 001; Xiguang-1 02 (Tanli)	SSO	Success	
8	Y10	19 August 2025; 07:33	LS-130, JSLC	AIRSAT 05 (Hashiao-2/Zhongke-05); Duogongneng Shiyan 2-01; Duogongneng Shiyan 2-02; Duogongneng Shiyan 2-03 (Tiantuo 6); Tianyan-26 (Henan Ligong-2); Thumbsat-1; Thumbsat-2	SSO	Success	
9	Y8	19 October 2025; 03:33	LS-130, JSLC	PRSC-HS1; AIRSAT-03 (Zhongke 03); AIRSAT-04 (Zhongke 04)	SSO	Success	
10	Y9	9 November 2025; 03:32	LS-130, JSLC	Chutian-2 01; Chutian-2 02	SSO	Success	
11	Y11	10 December 2025; 04:03	LS-130, JSLC	Satellite 813 (United Arab Emirates); Jilin-1 Gaofen 07B-01/07C-01/07D-01; Dongpo-15; Yixing-2 09; Yixian-A; SPNEX (Egypt); Slipper2Sat (Nepal)	SSO	Success	Payload deployment was reported as not being coordinated with other satellite operators, leading to a near-collision with a Starlink satellite.
12	Y12	14 April 2026; 04:03	LS-130, JSLC	Jilin-1 Gaofen 07 A02 x 8	SSO	Success	
13	Y13	15 May 2026; 04:33	LS-130, JSLC	Taijing-3 05A; Taijing-3 05B; Tianyi 50; Tianyan 27; Jilin-1 Gaofen 05D55	SSO	Success	
14	Y14	15 June 2026; 03:44	LS-130, JSLC	Jilin-1 Gaofen-04D 01-02; Jilin-1 Gaofen-05D 01-02; Jilin-1 Gaofen-07C 04; Jilin-1 Gaofen-07D 02-04	SSO	Success	
15	Y15	23 July 2026; 23:33	LS-130, JSLC	5 Satellites	SSO	Success	

=== Kinetica 2 ===
Flight number	Serial number	Date (UTC)	Launch site	Payload	Orbit	Result	Note
1	Y1	30 March 2026; 11:00	LS-140, JSLC	New March 01, Qingzhou Spacecraft Demo Flight, TS 01	SSO	Success	First Orbital Flight of Kinetica 2.
