= International Lunar Research Station =

Planned international lunar base

International Lunar Research Station (ILRS)
- International lunar research station countries map

Program overview
- Country: China; Russia; Azerbaijan; Belarus; Egypt; Nicaragua; Serbia; Pakistan; South Africa; Thailand; Venezuela; Kazakhstan; Senegal
- Purpose: Crewed lunar exploration and research

Program history
- Duration: Reconnaissance: 2021–2025; Construction: 2026–2035; Utilization: from 2036

The International Lunar Research Station (ILRS) (Chinese: 国际月球科研站, Russian: Международная научная лунная станция) is a planned lunar base led by Roscosmos and the China National Space Administration (CNSA) announced in 2021, aimed to begin construction from 2031. The ILRS will serve as a comprehensive scientific experiment base built on the lunar surface or in lunar orbit that can carry out multi-disciplinary and multi-objective scientific research activities including exploration and utilization, lunar-based observation, basic scientific experiment and technical verification, and long-term autonomous operation.

Roscosmos and CNSA announced that the project will be "open to all interested countries and international partners". In 2021, the project made an effort to engage members of the European Space Agency, but this was considered ended following the 2022 Russian invasion of Ukraine. The ILRS has been contrasted with the US-led Artemis Accords, sometimes described as part of a Second Cold War.

The ILRS construction missions are expected to begin from 2031, and will utilize the super heavy-lift Chinese Long March 9 and Russian Yenisei rockets in development. ILRS will build on the robotic lunar missions of the Chinese Lunar Exploration Program and Roscosmos' Luna-Glob program. China's 2028 Chang'e 8 mission will test in situ resource utilization for ILRS.

== History ==
On 9 March 2021, China and Russia signed a “Memorandum of Understanding between the Government of the People’s Republic of China and the Government of the Russian Federation Regarding Cooperation for the Construction of the International Lunar Research Station.” On 16 June 2021, Roscosmos and the China National Space Administration (CNSA) held a joint session in St. Petersburg, Russia, on the auspices of the Global Space Exploration Conference (GLEX 2021), dedicated to the presentation of the Roadmap for the creation of the International Lunar Research Station (ILRS). The session was attended by Sergei Saveliev, the Deputy Director General of Roscosmos for International Cooperation and Wu Yanhua, the Vice Administrator of CNSA (remotely).

Roscosmos and CNSA representatives held consultations on a draft declaration in September 2021, together with experts from Germany, France, Italy, the Netherlands, Malaysia, Thailand and the UN Office for Outer Space Affairs. The talks took place behind closed doors. The 2022 Russian invasion of Ukraine was seen as ending these efforts. The China-led ILRS has been contrasted with the US-led Artemis Accords, described as part of a Second Cold War.

In July 2023, China's Deep Space Exploration Laboratory announced the signing of a memorandum of understanding with Swiss company Nano-SPACE for Cooperation on the International Lunar Research Station project. On the same day, a letter of intent was also signed with the Hawaii-based, non-profit International Lunar Observatory Association (ILOA Hawai'i) (which already participated in the Chang'e-3 lander mission) for cooperation on the ILRS initiative, despite earlier restrictions by U.S. Congress limiting American collaboration with the China National Space Administration. ILRS's lab director Wu Weiren also led in-depth talks with officials from France's Thales Group, which considers the possibility for future cooperation with the Chinese space agency.

On July 17, 2023, Venezuela formally joined the ILRS initiative, with its Bolivarian Agency for Space Activities signing an agreement with China's CNSA which, among other things, provided China access to Venezuelan ground stations in support of ILRS missions.

On September 1, 2023, a Memorandum of Understanding was signed between Humbulani Mudau, CEO of SANSA (the South African National Space Agency), and Chen Xiaodong, Chinese Ambassador to South Africa, acting on behalf of CNSA. The agreement will reportedly see CNSA and SANSA carry out extensive cooperation in the demonstration, implementation, operation and application of the ILRS, as well as training and other areas.

On October 3, 2023, an agreement was signed between China's CNSA and Azerbaijan's Azercosmos regarding the latter's entry into the International Lunar Research Station Program. Azercosmos director Samaddin Asadov signed the agreement at the 74th International Astronautical Conference, held in Baku. Pakistan and Belarus also joined the program in the same month.

In November 2023, UAE's University of Sharjah and the Asia-Pacific Space Cooperation Organization (APSCO) joined the ILRS.

=== 2024–present ===
In April 2024, Thailand and Turkey applied to join the ILRS. Thailand has since joined, but Turkey has not yet officially become a signatory.

Computer generated renders of the base were first widely shared in April 2024.

In May 2024, it was reported that Russia was considering plans to incorporate nuclear energy towards powering the station.

In June 2024, Russia's cooperation was codified into law.

== Members ==
Member	Joined	Notes
China	16 June 2021	Founding member
Russia	16 June 2021	Founding member
Venezuela	17 July 2023	To provide access to ground stations
South Africa	1 September 2023	SANSA, SARAO, FSDA
Azerbaijan	3 October 2023	
Pakistan	20 October 2023	
Belarus	23 October 2023	
Egypt	7 December 2023	
Thailand	5 April 2024	
Nicaragua	24 April 2024	
Serbia	9 May 2024	
Kazakhstan	5 July 2024	
Senegal	5 September 2024	

== Definition and composition ==
ILRS is a complex experimental research facility to be constructed with a possible attraction of partners on the surface and/or in the orbit of the Moon designed for multi-discipline and multi-purpose scientific research activities, including exploration and use of the Moon, Moon-based observation, fundamental research experiments, and technology verification with the capability of long-term uncrewed operation with the prospect of subsequent human presence.

=== Scientific objectives ===
- Lunar topography, geomorphology, and geological structure
- Lunar Physics and internal structure
- Lunar Chemistry (materials and geoarchaeology)
- Cis-Lunar space environment
- Lunar-based astronomical observation
- Lunar based Earth observation
- Lunar-based biological and medical experiment
- Lunar Resource in-situ utilization

=== Facilities ===
- Cislunar Transportation Facility – supporting round-trip transfers between the Earth and the Moon, including lunar descent, landing, ascent, and return to Earth.
- Long-term Support Facility on Lunar Surface – to consist of various support modules for operations on the lunar surface.
- Lunar Transportation and Operation Facility – to consist of modules for lunar exploration and cargo transportation.
- Lunar Scientific Facility – to support in-orbit and surface experiments
- Ground Support and Application Facility – data center and ground support operations

== Development ==
The image above contains clickable links

Timeline of the Chinese Lunar Exploration Program starting from phase IV.

=== Phase 1: Reconnaissance (2021–2025) ===
Objectives:

- Lunar reconnaissance with the planned missions
- ILRS design and selection of site(s)
- Technology verification for a secure high-precision soft landing

==== Planned Missions ====
Most missions that are planned in the reconnaissance era weren't specifically planned for the ILRS, with some being planned in the 1990s. However, their reconnaissance can still prove useful to the overall mission.

===== Chang'e 4 =====
Chang'e 4 achieved a soft landing on the far side of the Moon after its launch on 7 December 2018, and entering lunar orbit on 12 December as a part of China's Chinese Lunar Exploration Program. While not specifically made for the Research Station, as it was a backup module for its predecessor, Chang'e 3, it helped with Reconnaissance for the mission as a whole, a theme for most reconnaissance missions for the Research Station.

===== Luna 25 =====
Luna 25 was sent to the Moon by Roscosmos to deliver 30 kg of scientific payloads and instruments to the surface of the Moon. It was not planned specifically for the Research Station, with planning going back to the 1990s. However, this craft crashed on the moon due to an incorrect orbit calculation.

On 25 August 2023, Roscosmos Director Yury Borisov, during a meeting with representatives of NPO Lavochkin involved in the development of the mission, stated that consideration was being given to recreating the Luna 25 mission with a possible launch for the second attempt slated to occur in 2025 or 2026.

==== Chang'e 6 ====
China sent Chang'e 6 on 3 May 2024, which conducted the first lunar sample return from Apollo Basin on the far side of the Moon. This is China's second lunar sample return mission, the first was achieved by Chang'e 5 from the lunar near side 4 years earlier. It also carried a Chinese rover called Jinchan to conduct infrared spectroscopy of lunar surface and imaged Chang'e 6 lander on lunar surface. The lander-ascender-rover combination was separated with the orbiter and returner before landing on 1 June 2024 at 22:23 UTC. It landed on the Moon's surface on 1 June 2024. The ascender was launched back to lunar orbit on 3 June 2024 at 23:38 UTC, carrying samples collected by the lander, and later completed another robotic rendezvous and docking in lunar orbit. The sample container was transferred to the returner, which landed in Inner Mongolia on 25 June 2024, completing China's far side extraterrestrial sample return mission. After dropping off the return samples for Earth, the Chang'e 6 (CE-6) orbiter was successfully captured by the Sun-Earth L2 Lagrange point on 9 September 2024, where it left this orbit for a solar orbit in March 2025. Pakistan sent a lunar orbiter called ICUBE-Q along with Chang'e 6.

===== Luna 26 =====
Luna 26 is a planned lunar polar orbiter. Along with the scientific payload that it would carry, it would allow for a telecom array for landed Russian assets, and Earth. The mission was announced in November 2022, and it has a launch planned for 2028. It will study the lunar surface and perform reconnaissance for the future Luna 27.

List of missions (Includes potential missions of other partners)
Date	Country (Agency)	Launch vehicle	Spacecraft	Image	Status
7 December 2018	China (CNSA)	LM-3B	Chang'e 4		Successful
10 August 2023	Russia (Roscosmos)	Soyuz-2.1b	Luna 25		Spacecraft failure
3 May 2024	China (CNSA)	LM-5	Chang'e 6		Successful
8 May 2024	Pakistan (SUPARCO)	LM-5	ICUBE-Q		Operational
2026	China (CNSA)	LM-5	Chang'e 7		Planned
2028	Russia (Roscosmos)	Soyuz-2	Luna 26		Planned
2029	Russia (Roscosmos)	Soyuz-2	Luna 27		Planned

=== Phase 2: Construction (2026–2035) ===
Stage 1 (2026–2030)

- Technology verification for the command center of ILRS
- Lunar sample return
- Massive cargo delivery and secure high-precision soft landing
- Start of joint operations

Stage 2 (2031–2035)

- Establishment of in-orbit and surface facilities for the ILRS, in preparation for crewed missions

Phase includes two normal missions and five crucial missions
Missions	Objectives	Date	Country (Agency)	Launch Vehicle	Spacecraft	Image	Status
		2028	China (CNSA)	LM-5	Chang'e 8		Planned
	Pakistan's first lunar rover scheduled to launched as part of the Chang'e 8 mission, The rover will carry out scientific research in the lunar south polar region.	2028	Pakistan (SUPARCO)	LM-5	Jinnah-1 (onboard Chang'e 8)		Planned
		2034	Russia (Roscosmos)	Angara A5	Luna 28		Planned
5 crucial missions planned for comprehensive establishment of ILRS to complete the in-orbit and surface facilities between 2030 and 2035
ILRS-1	"Establishment of the command center, basic energy, and telecommunication facilities, to satisfy the needs of lunar infrastructure, lunar autonomous operations, and long-term research exploration."	2031	TBA	LM-9 or Yenisei	TBA		Planned
ILRS-2	"Establishment of lunar research and exploration facilities such as lunar physics, geological profiling, lava tube exploration, lunar sample return."	2032	TBA	LM-9 or Yenisei	TBA		Planned
ILRS-3	"Establishment of lunar in-situ resources utilization technology verification facilities."	2033	TBA	LM-9 or Yenisei	TBA		Planned
ILRS-4	"Verification of the general technologies for the lunar biomedical experiment distributes sample collection and return."	2034	TBA	LM-9 or Yenisei	TBA		Planned
ILRS-5	"Establishment of Lunar-based astronomy and earth observation capabilities."	2035	TBA	LM-9 or Yenisei	TBA		Planned

=== Phase 3: Utilization (from 2036) ===
Objectives:

- Lunar research, exploration, and technology verification
- Supporting crewed lunar missions with the completed ILRS
- Expanding and maintaining modules as needed

== See also ==
- Politics of outer space
- Space law
- Moon Treaty
- Coordinated Lunar Time
- Artemis Accords – Multilateral agreement on human moon exploration
- Artemis program – NASA-led lunar exploration program
- Chinese Lunar Exploration Program – Lunar research program (2004–present)
- Luna-Glob – Moon exploration program by the Russian Federal Space Agency
- Moonbase – Long-term human settlement on the Moon
