= Expendable launch system =

Launch system that uses a single use launch vehicle

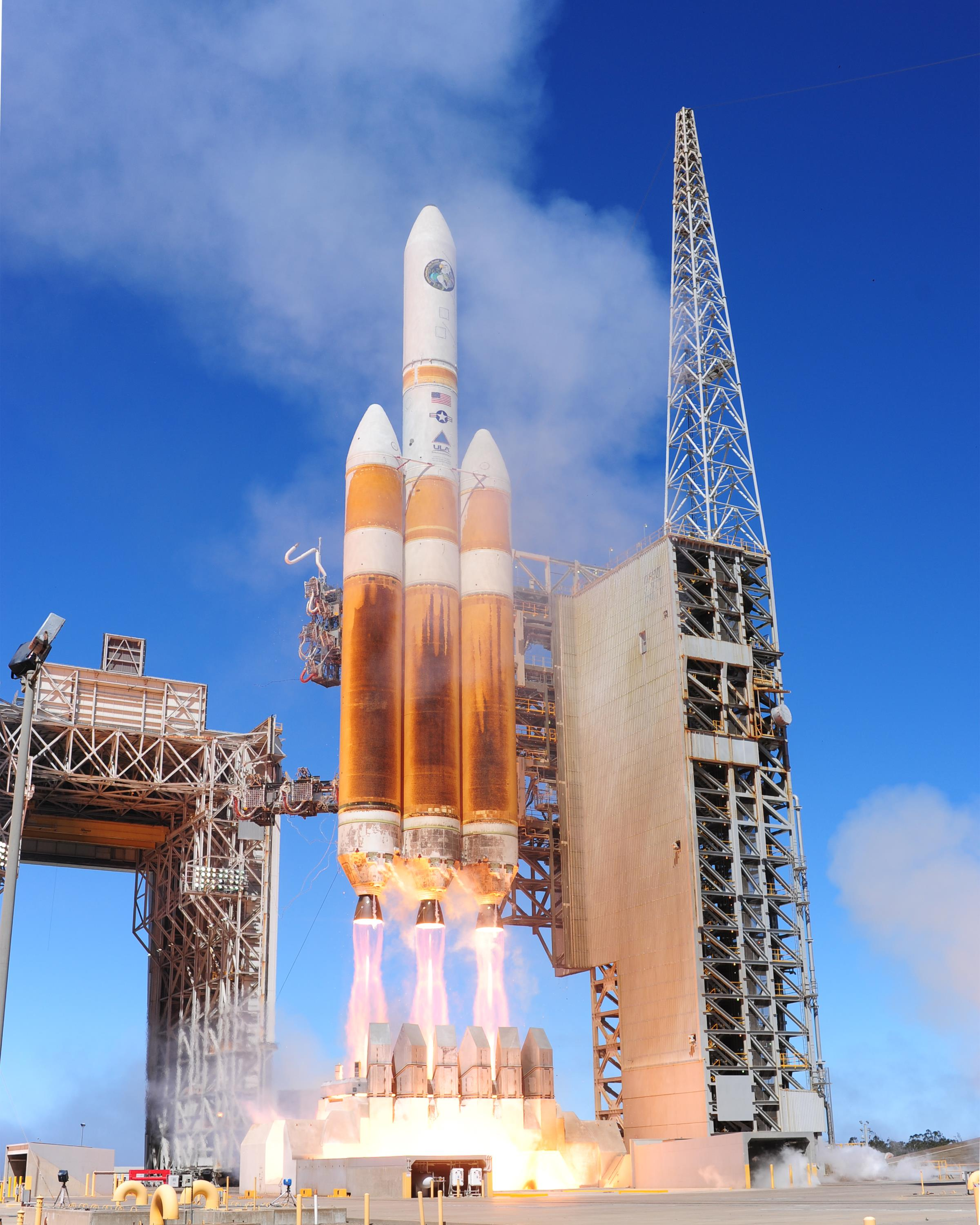
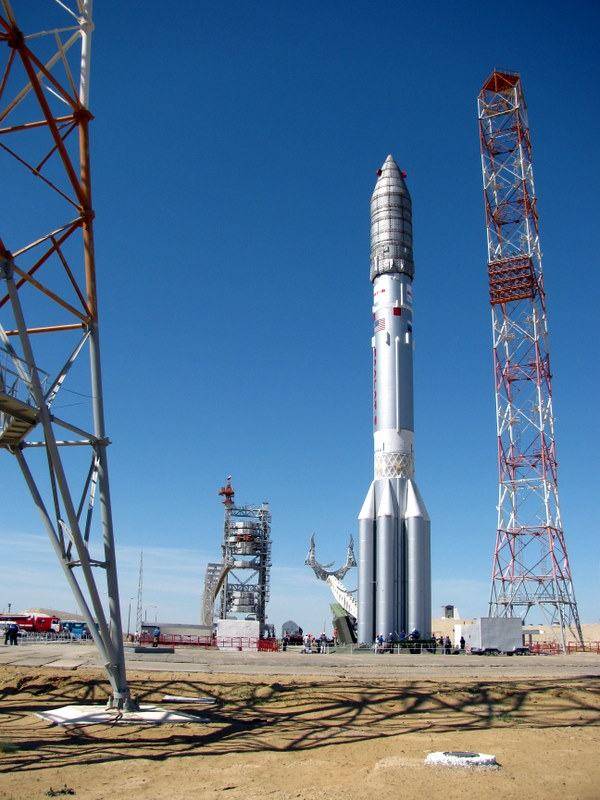
A Delta IV Heavy rocket (up) and a Proton-M rocket (down)

An expendable launch system (or expendable launch vehicle/ELV) is a launch vehicle that can be launched only once, after which its components are destroyed during reentry or impact with Earth, or discarded in space. ELVs typically consist of several rocket stages that are discarded sequentially as their fuel is exhausted and the vehicle gains altitude and speed.

During the Space Race, all launch vehicles were expendable. Reusable launch vehicles (RLV), seeing early development with the Space Shuttle, gained prominence from the 2010s with the American private spaceflight vehicles Falcon 9, Falcon Heavy, and New Glenn. As of 2024, the ELV share of satellite and human spacecraft launches continues to shrink.

There remain many instances where a ELV may still have a compelling use case over a reusable vehicle. ELVs are simpler in design than reusable launch systems and therefore may have a lower production cost. Furthermore, an ELV can use its entire fuel supply to accelerate its payload, offering greater payloads, and many RLVs operate expendable configurations for some launches. ELVs are a proven technology in widespread use for many decades. As of 2026, ELVs remain the most powerful operational rockets of the space programs of the US (Space Launch System), China (Long March 5), Europe (Ariane 6), Russia (Angara A5), and Japan (H3).

== Current operators ==
=== Arianespace ===
Arianespace SA is a French company founded in March 1980 as the world's first commercial launch service provider. It operates the Ariane 6, a medium-to-heavy-lift rocket. Arianespace is a subsidiary of ArianeGroup, a joint venture between Airbus and Safran.

European space launches involve collaboration between private industry and government agencies. Arianespace is responsible for marketing Ariane 6 launch services, preparing missions, and managing customer relations. At the Guiana Space Centre (CSG) in French Guiana, the company oversees teams that integrate and prepare launch vehicles. The launch infrastructure at CSG is owned by the European Space Agency, while the site itself is managed by CNES, France's national space agency. The Ariane 6 rocket is designed and manufactured by ArianeGroup.

As of October 2025, Arianespace had conducted 355 missions and launched over 1,100 satellites across a span of 45 years. Its first commercial launch, Spacenet 1, took place on 23 May 1984. In addition to its operations at CSG, Arianespace maintains its headquarters in Évry-Courcouronnes, a suburb of Paris.

=== China ===
- Air-Launched SLV able to place a 50 kilogram plus payload to 500 km SSO
- Ceres-1 small-lift solid-fueled launch vehicle from private firm (relatively high launch cadence)
- Ceres-2 small-lift solid-fueled launch vehicle from private firm (the only launch failed)
- Gravity-1 medium-lift sea-launched solid fuel launch vehicle
- Gravity-2 partially reusable heavy-lift launch vehicle from private firm currently under development
- Hyperbola-1 small-lift solid-fueled launch vehicle from private firm
- Hyperbola-3 medium-lift liquid-fueled (methalox) launch vehicle with reusable first stage (VTVL) from private firm currently under development
- Jielong 3 small to medium-lift solid fueled launch vehicle currently in service
- Kaituozhe-1A (开拓者一号甲)
- Kuaizhou quick-reaction small-lift solid fuel launch vehicle
- Lijian-1 small to medium-lift solid fuel launch vehicle currently in service (by the commercial spin-off of the Chinese Academy of Sciences)
- Lijian-2 medium-lift launch vehicle utilizing liquid fuel (kerolox) with reusable first stage (in service)
- CZ-2F/G Modified CZ-2F without escape tower, specially used for launching robotic missions such as Shenzhou cargo and space laboratory module with payload capacity up to 11.2 tons in LEO
- CZ-3B(A) More powerful Long March rockets using larger-size liquid propellant strap-on motors, with payload capacity up to 13 tons in LEO
- CZ-3C Launch vehicle combining CZ-3B core with two boosters from CZ-2E
- CZ-4C
- CZ-5 heavy-lift hydrolox launch vehicle (with kerolox boosters)
- CZ-5B variant of the CZ-5 for low Earth orbit payloads (up to 25 tonnes to LEO)
- CZ-6 or Small Launch Vehicle; small-lift kerolox LV with short launch preparation period, low cost and high reliability, to meet the launch need of small satellites up to 500 kg to 700 km SSO, first flight for 2010; with Fan Ruixiang (范瑞祥) as Chief designer of the project
- CZ-7 medium-lift kerolox launch vehicle for launching resupply missions to the Tiangong space station
- CZ-8 medium-lift launch vehicle mainly for launching payloads to SSO orbits
- CZ-9 super heavy-lift launch vehicle with a LEO lift capability of 150 tonnes currently under development (planned to be fully reusable in time)
- CZ-10 crew-rated super-heavy launch vehicle for crewed lunar missions under development
- CZ-10A crew-rated medium-lift launch vehicle for launching the next-generation crewed spacecraft to LEOs with reusable first stage currently under development
- CZ-11 small-lift solid fuel quick-response launch vehicle
- CZ-12 medium-lift kerolox launch vehicle
- CZ-12A partially reusable (1st stage) medium-lift methalox launch vehicle (in service)
- CZ-12B partially reusable (1st stage) medium-lift to heavy-lift kerolox launch vehicle (in service)
- Pallas-1 reusable (1st stage) medium-lift liquid fuel (kerolox) launch vehicle by private firm currently under development
- Project 921-3 Reusable launch vehicle current project of the reusable shuttle system.
- Tengyun another current project of two wing-staged reusable shuttle system
- Reusable spaceplane reusable vertically launched spaceplane with wings that lands on a runway and currently in service (speculated to be similar to the US X-37B in form and function)
- Tianlong-2 medium-lift kerolox launch vehicle from private firm (in service)
- Tianlong-3 medium to heavy-lift kerolox launch vehicle with reusable first stage from private firm (the only launch failed)
- Zhuque-2 medium-lift liquid fuel (methalox) launch vehicle by private firm currently in service (first methane fueled rocket in the world to reach space and to reach orbit with payload)
- Zhuque-3 medium to heavy-lift methalox launch vehicle by private firm with reusable first stage (in service)

=== ISRO ===
Comparison of Indian carrier rockets. Left to right: SLV, ASLV, PSLV, GSLV, LVM 3

During the 1960s and 1970s, India initiated its own launch vehicle program in alignment with its geopolitical and economic considerations. In the 1960s–1970s, the country India started with a sounding rocket in the 1960s and 1970s and advanced its research to deliver the Satellite Launch Vehicle-3 and the more advanced Augmented Satellite Launch Vehicle (ASLV), complete with operational supporting infrastructure by the 1990s.

=== JAXA ===
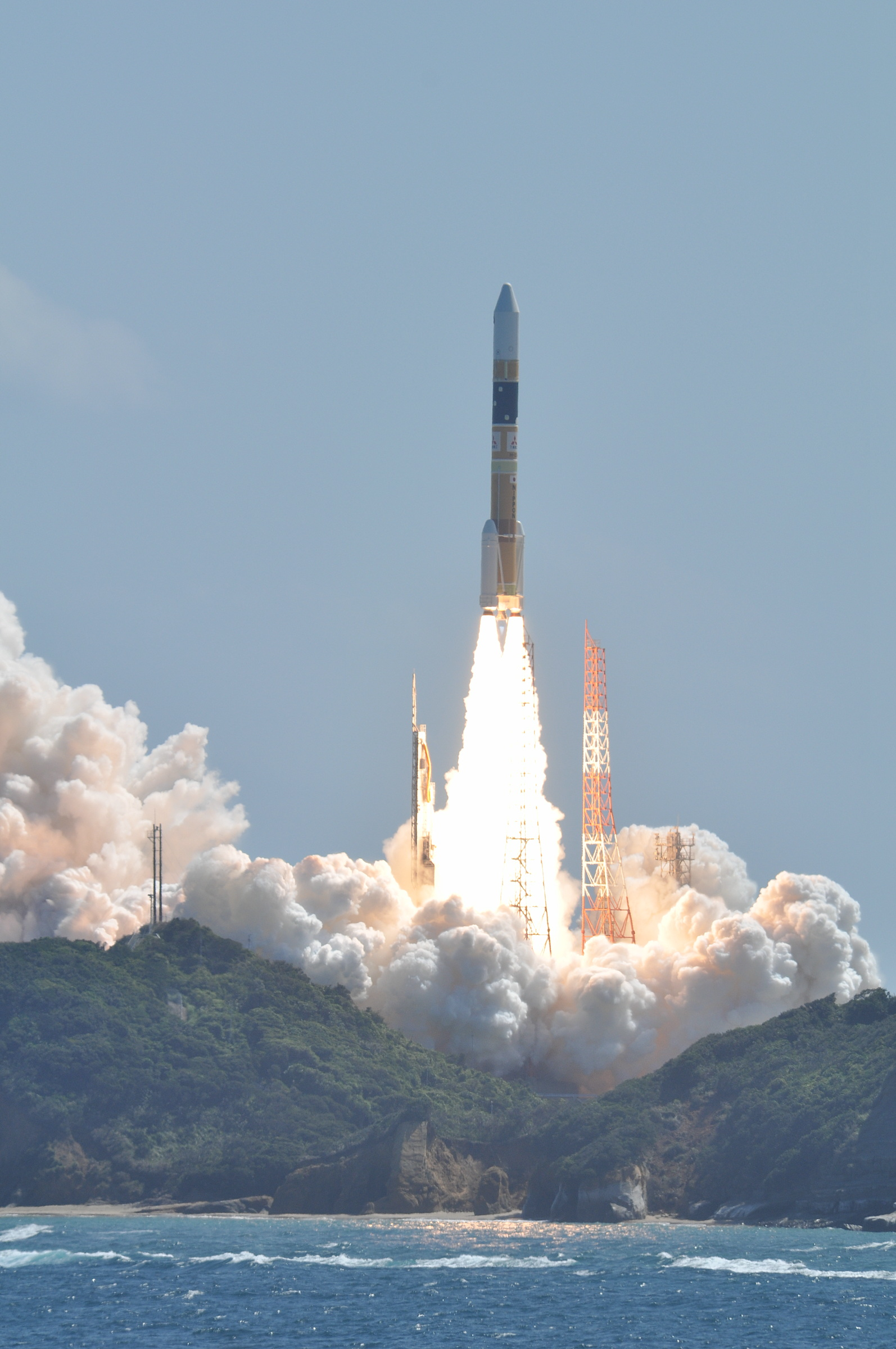
H-IIA F19 launch

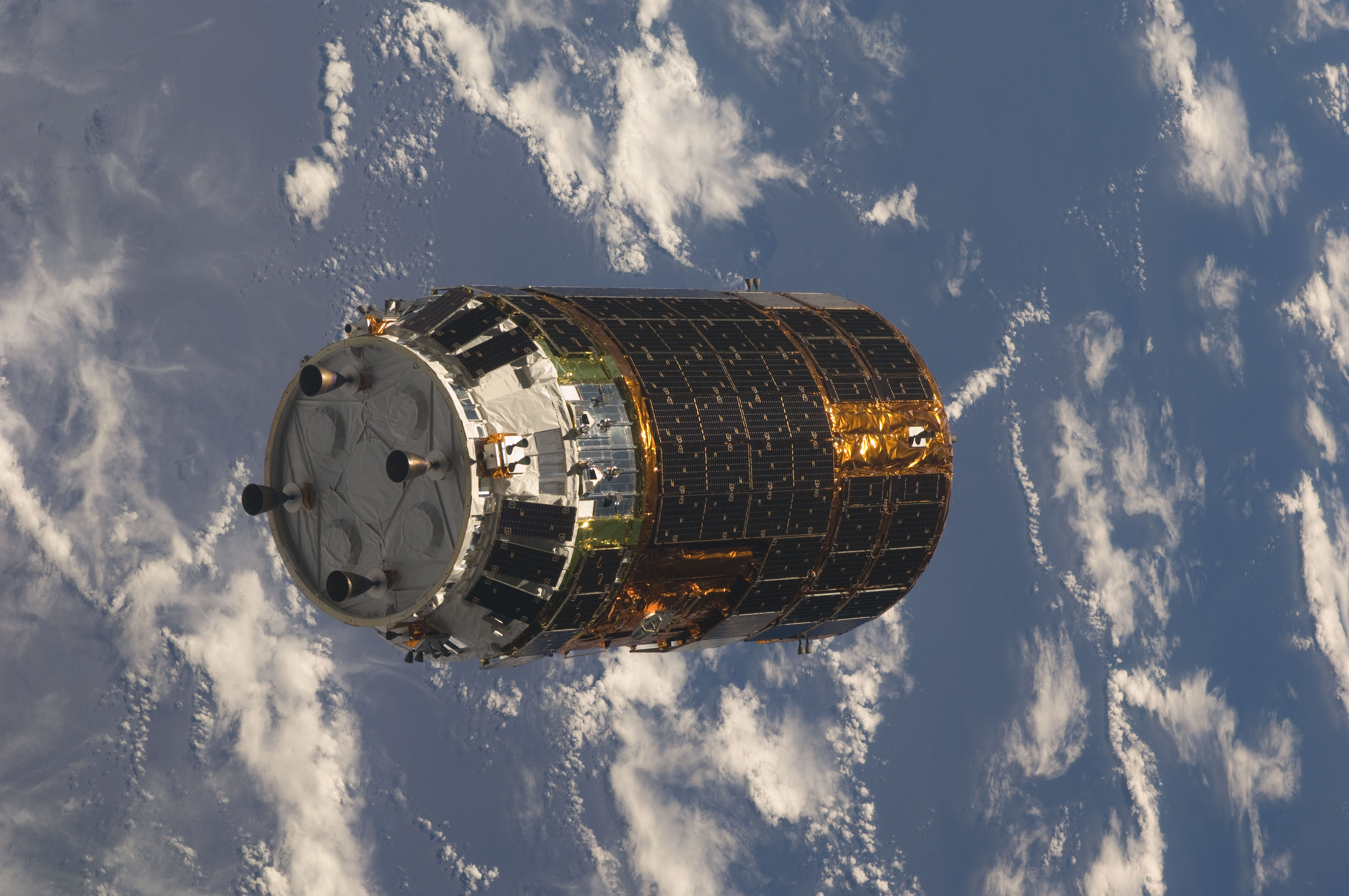
H-II Transfer Vehicle

Japan launched its first satellite, Ohsumi, in 1970, using ISAS' L-4S rocket. Prior to the merger, ISAS used small Mu rocket family of solid-fueled launch vehicles, while NASDA developed larger liquid-fueled launchers. In the beginning, NASDA used licensed American models.

The first model of liquid-fueled launch vehicle developed domestically in Japan was the H-II, introduced in 1994. NASDA developed the H-II with two goals in mind: to be able to launch satellites using only its own technology, such as the ISAS, and to dramatically improve its launch capability over previous licensed models. To achieve these two goals, a staged combustion cycle was adopted for the first stage engine, the LE-7. The combination of the liquid hydrogen two-stage combustion cycle first stage engine and solid rocket boosters was carried over to its successor, the H-IIA and H-IIB and became the basic configuration of Japan's liquid fuel launch vehicles for 30 years, from 1994 to 2024.

In 2003, JAXA was formed by merging Japan's three space agencies to streamline Japan's space program, and JAXA took over operations of the H-IIA liquid-fueled launch vehicle, the M-V solid-fuel launch vehicle, and several observation rockets from each agency. The H-IIA is a launch vehicle that improved reliability while reducing costs by making significant improvements to the H-II, and the M-V was the world's largest solid-fuel launch vehicle at the time.

In November 2003, JAXA's first launch after its inauguration, H-IIA No. 6, failed, but all other H-IIA launches were successful, and as of June 2025, the H-IIA had successfully launched 48 of its 49 launches. JAXA ended H-IIA operations by retiring it with H-IIA Flight No. 50, that was launched on 28 June 2025.

JAXA operated the H-IIB, an upgraded version of the H-IIA, from September 2009 to May 2020 and successfully launched the H-II Transfer Vehicle six times. This cargo spacecraft was responsible for resupplying the Kibo Japanese Experiment Module on the International Space Station.

To be able to launch smaller mission on JAXA developed a new solid-fueled rocket, the Epsilon as a replacement to the retired M-V. The maiden flight successfully happened in 2013. So far, the rocket has flown six times with one launch failure.

In January 2017, JAXA attempted and failed to put a miniature satellite into orbit atop one of its SS520 series rockets. A second attempt on 2 February 2018 was successful, putting a four kilogram CubeSat into Earth orbit. The rocket, known as the SS-520-5, is the world's smallest orbital launcher.

In 2023, JAXA began operating the H3, which will replace the H-IIA and H-IIIB; the H3 is a liquid-fueled launch vehicle developed from a completely new design like the H-II, rather than an improved development like the H-IIA and H-IIB, which were based on the H-II. The design goal of the H3 is to increase launch capability at a lower cost than the H-IIA and H-IIB. To achieve this, an expander bleed cycle was used for the first time in the world for the first stage of the engine.

=== Roscosmos ===
Roscosmos uses a family of several launch rockets, the most famous of them being the R-7, commonly known as the Soyuz rocket that is capable of launching about 7.5 tons into low Earth orbit (LEO). The Proton rocket (or UR-500K) has a lift capacity of over 20 tons to LEO. Smaller rockets include Rokot and other Stations.

Currently rocket development encompasses both a new rocket system, Angara, as well as enhancements of the Soyuz rocket, Soyuz-2 and Soyuz-2-3. Two modifications of the Soyuz, the Soyuz-2.1a and Soyuz-2.1b have already been successfully tested, enhancing the launch capacity to 8.5 tons to LEO. Future projects include the Soyuz successor launch rocket.

=== South Korea ===
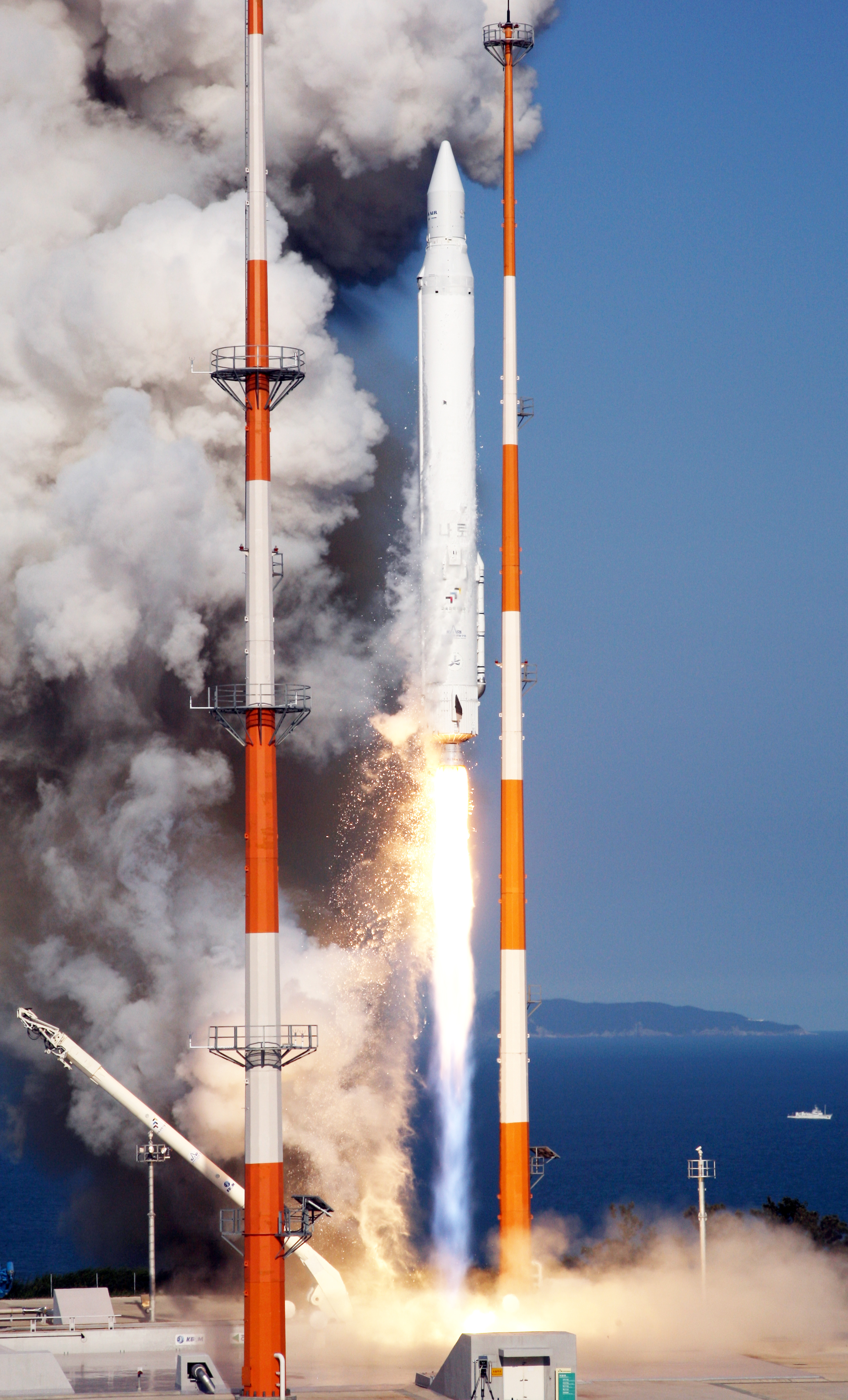
Naro-1

From August 2002 to April 2013, with a total budget of 502.5 billion won for 11 years, domestic researchers focused on developing Naro-1, the first space launch vehicle in the country capable of launching a 100-kg class small satellite into low Earth's orbit. About 150 private companies, including Korean Air, Hanwha, Korea Fiber, and Doowon Heavy Industries, participated in the Naro development project and were responsible for on-site technologies such as parts design and production, ground and launch facility production, and launch vehicle assembly.

The first rocket launched in 2021 was Nuri, which was designed, manufactured, tested, and launched using purely domestic technology, including the engine. It was developed over 12 years, starting in March 2010, with an investment of 1.9572 trillion won. The goal of the Nuri development project was to build a launch vehicle that could place a 1.5-ton practical satellite into low Earth orbit (600–800 km). The engines installed in units 1–3 are as follows. First stage: 4 liquid engines with a thrust of 75 tons (clustered); Second stage: 1 liquid engine with 75 tons of thrust; Third stage: 1 liquid engine with 7 tons of thrust.

The 7-ton engine and 75-ton engine KRE-075 were developed to operate in extreme environments of high pressure, extremely low temperature, and ultra-high temperature. The launch pad is located at the Naro Space Center in Goheung, South Jeolla Province, and was built by Hyundai Heavy Industries from 2016 to 2021. Nuri is scheduled for its fourth launch in November 2025.

As the need arose to develop the KSLV-III into a reusable launch vehicle, the KASA prepared a plan to improve the launch vehicle development project. The chief of KASA Yoon Young-bin explained the reason, saying, "We decided that it was time to discuss ways to simultaneously achieve the two tasks of launching a lunar lander on one's own and developing an economically feasible national space launch vehicle."

=== United States ===
Several governmental agencies of the United States purchase ELV launches. NASA is a major customer with the Commercial Resupply Services and Commercial Crew Development programs, also launching scientific spacecraft. The vast majority of launch vehicles for its missions, from the Redstone missile to the Delta, Atlas, Titan and Saturn rocket families, have been expendable. As its flagship crewed exploration replacement for the partially reusable Space Shuttle, NASA's newest ELV, the Space Launch System flew successfully in November 2022 after delays of more than six years. It is planned to serve in a major role on crewed exploration programs going forward.

The United States Air Force is also an ELV customer, having designed the Titan, Atlas, and Delta families. The Atlas V from the 1994 Evolved ELV (EELV) program remains in active service, operated by United Launch Alliance. The National Security Space Launch (NSSL) competition has selected two EELV successors, the expendable Vulcan Centaur and partially reusable Falcon 9, to provide assured access to space.

=== Iranian Space Agency ===
==== Safir ====
Iran has developed an expendable satellite launch vehicle named Safir SLV. Measuring 22 m in height with a core diameter of 1.25 m, with two liquid propellant stages, a single thrust chambered first stage and a two-thrust chambered, step-throttled second stage, the SLV has a lift off mass exceeding 26 tons. The first stage consists of a lengthened up-rated Shahab-3C. According to the technical documentation presented in the annual meeting of the United Nations Office for Outer Space Affairs, it is a two-stage rocket with all liquid propellant engines. The first stage is capable of carrying the payload to the maximum altitude of 68 kilometres.

The Safir-1B is the second generation of Safir SLV and can carry a satellite weighing 60 kg into an elliptical orbit of 300 to 450 km. The thrust of the Safir-1B rocket engine has been increased from 32 to 37 tons.

==== Simorgh ====
In 2010, a more powerful rocket named Simorgh was built. Its mission is to carry heavier satellites into orbit. The Simorgh rocket is 27 meters (89 feet) long, and has a mass of 77 tonnes (85 tons). Its first stage is powered by four main engines, each generating up to 29,000 kilograms (64,000 pounds) of thrust, plus a fifth which will be used for attitude control, which provides an additional 13,600 kilograms (30,000 pounds). At liftoff, these engines will generate a total of 130,000 kilograms (290,000 pounds) of thrust. Simorgh is capable of putting a 350-kilogram (770 lb) payload into a 500-kilometer (310-mile) low Earth orbit. In 2015, Israeli media reported that the missile is capable of taking a crewed spacecraft or satellite into space. The first flight of the Simorgh rocket occurred on 19 April 2016.

==== Qoqnoos ====
On 2 February 2013, the head of the Iranian Space Agency, Hamid Fazeli mentioned that the new satellite launch vehicle, Qoqnoos will be used after the Simorgh SLV for heavier payloads.

=== Israel Space Agency ===
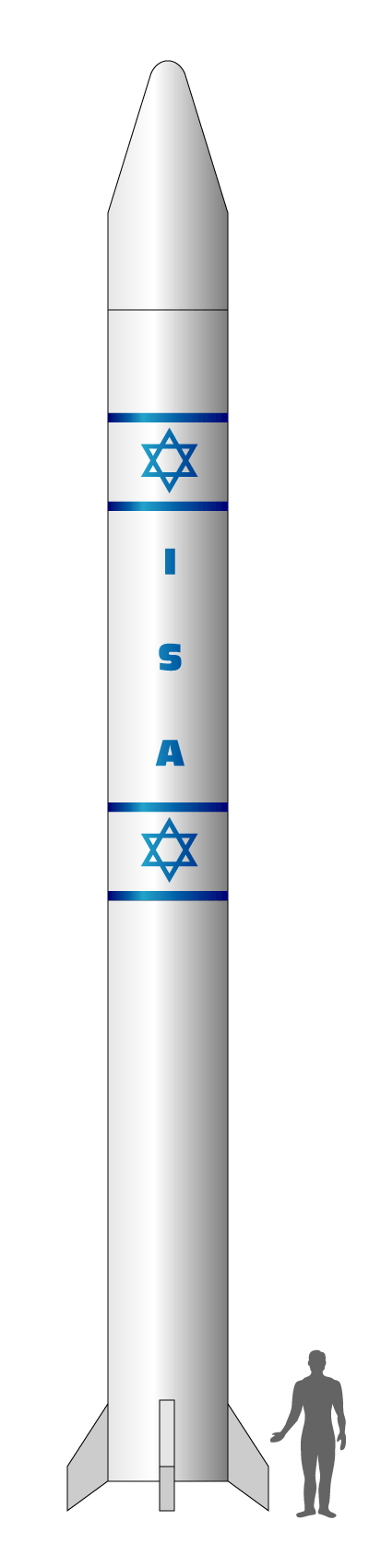
Shavit Rocket

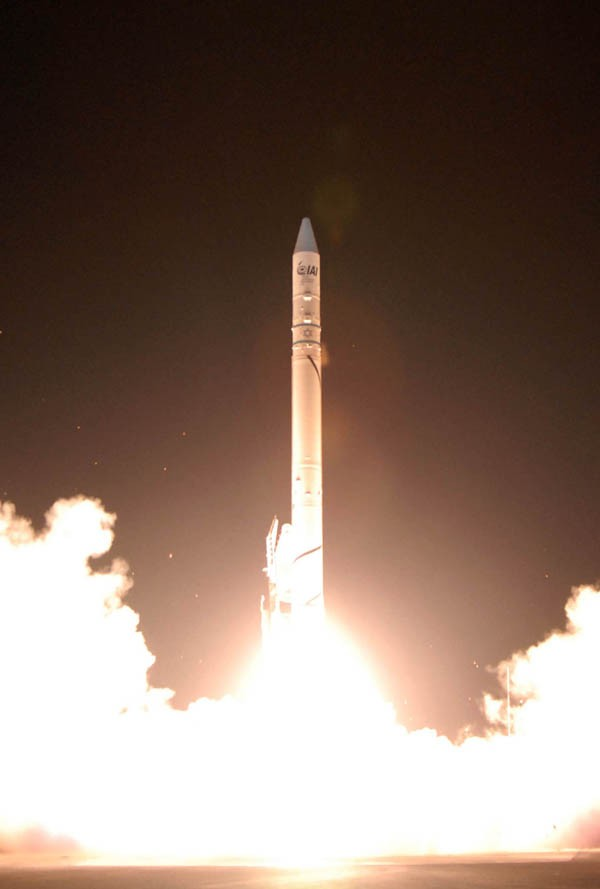
Shavit launcher

The Israel Space Agency is one of only seven countries that both build their own satellites and launch their own launchers. The Shavit is a space launch vehicle capable of sending payload into low Earth orbit. The Shavit launcher has been used to send every Ofeq satellite to date.

The development of the Shavit began in 1983 and its operational capabilities were proven on three successful launches of the Ofek satellites on September 19, 1988; April 3, 1990; and April 5, 1995. The Shavit launchers allows low-cost and high-reliability launch of micro/mini satellites to a low Earth orbit. The Shavit launcher is developed by Malam factory, one of four factories in the IAI Electronics Group. The factory is very experienced in development, assembling, testing and operating system for use in space.

The Shavit is a triple-stage launcher solid propellant booster based on the 2-stage Jericho-II ballistic missile. The first and second stage engines are manufactured by Ta'as, and use solid fuel. The third stage engines are manufactured by Rafael Advanced Defense Systems. The next generation Shavit rockets, now called the Shavit-2 are being developed. The Shavit-2 is said to be made available for commercial launches in the near future.

== See also ==
- Comparison of orbital launch systems
- Comparison of orbital launchers families
- Launch vehicle
- Lists of rockets
- Spacecraft propulsion
- Spaceflight
