= DSL (disambiguation) =

DSL is digital subscriber line, a family of digital data transmission technologies over telephone network wires.

DSL or dsl may also refer to:

== Computing ==
- Damn Small Linux, a very small Linux distribution
- Definitive software library, a secure information technology repository
- Domain-specific language, a specialized computer language

== Law ==
- Data Security Law of the People's Republic of China
- Design Science License, a copyleft license for intellectual property

== Other uses ==
- Danish Sign Language (ISO 639-3: dsl)
- Diagnostic Systems Laboratories, a company now part of Beckman-Coulter
- Dictionary of the Scots Language, an online Scots–English dictionary
- Discovering the Sky at the Longest Wavelengths, a lunar orbit array mission
- Dominican Summer League, of baseball
- DSL, a musical artist signed to Ed Banger Records
- German School Lagos (German: Deutsche Schule Lagos)
- "Don't Say Love", a 2023 song by Leigh-Anne
