= Rong Yi =

- 容易
- Born: Rong Yi (容艺); October 1978 (age 47); Enshi, Hubei, China
- Education: National University of Defense Technology; Tsinghua University
- Scientific career
- Fields: Rocket
- Workplaces: China Academy of Launch Vehicle Technology

Rong Yi (Chinese: 容易; pinyin: Róng Yì; born October 1978) is a Chinese rocket engineer of Tujia ethnicity who is the chief designer of Long March 2F.

Rong is a member of the 14th National Committee of the Chinese People's Political Consultative Conference.

== Biography ==
Rong was born Rong Yi (容艺; 容藝; Róng Yì) in Enshi, Hubei, in October 1978. In 1994 she attended Enshi No.1 High School. In 1997, she enrolled at the National University of Defense Technology, where she majored in space engineering. In 2001, she pursued advanced studies at Tsinghua University, earning her doctor's degree in engineering in 2006. Soon after, she was a postdoctoral fellow at the China Academy of Launch Vehicle Technology.

After graduating in March 2008, Rong was assigned as a rocket designer to the Overall Design Department of China Academy of Launch Vehicle Technology. In 2017 she became deputy chief designer of the Long March 9. In 2021, she succeeded Zhang Zhi as the chief designer of Long March 2F.

== Honours and awards ==
- 2020 Fellow of the International Academy of Astronautics

Academic offices
Preceded by Zhang Zhi	Chief Designer of Long March 2F; 2021–present	Incumbent
