= Luna 26 =

Planned Russian lunar orbiter

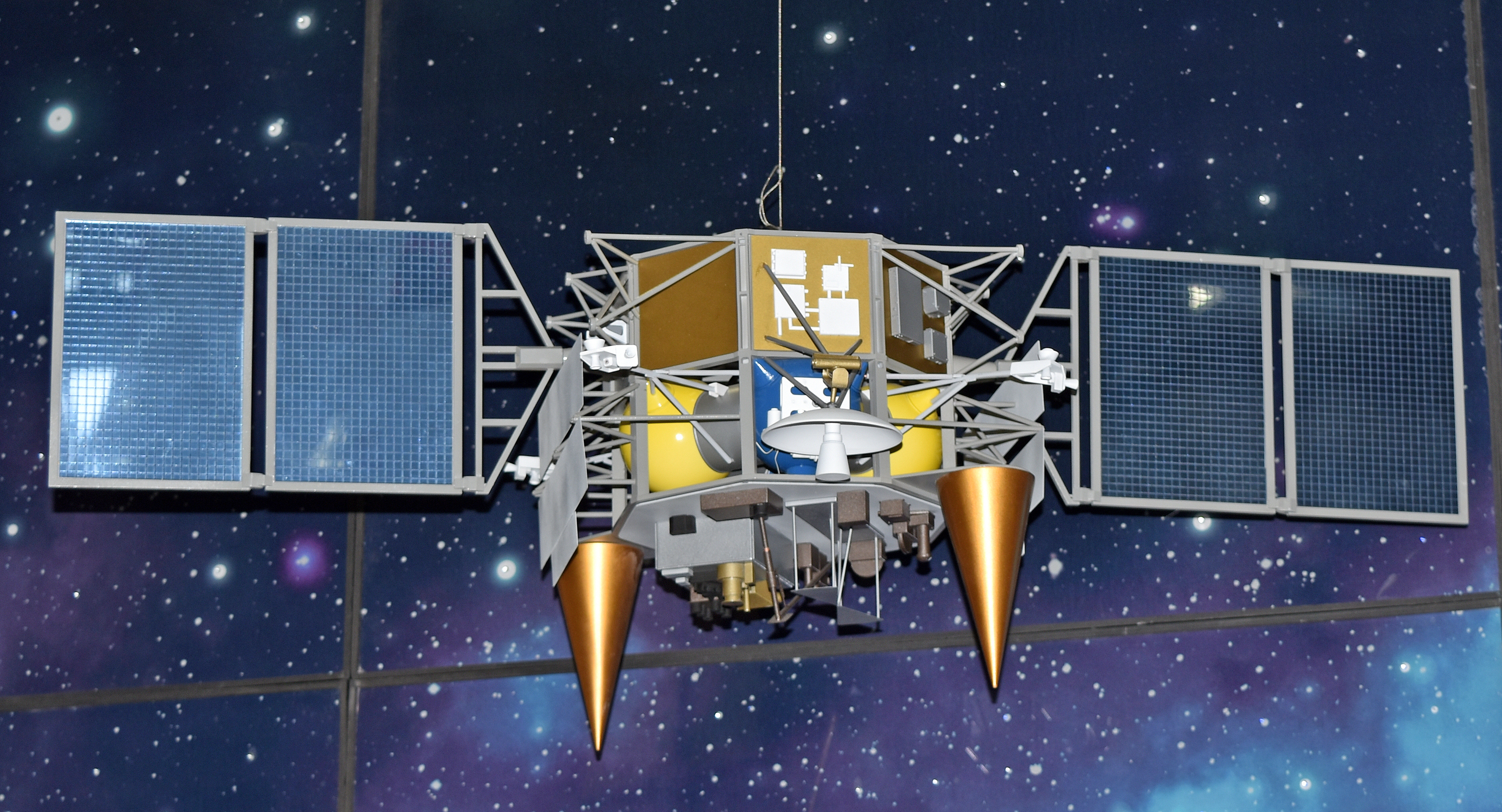
- Maquette of Luna-26 Moon orbiter
- Names: Luna-Resurs-Orbiter; Luna-Resurs O
- Mission type: Lunar orbiter, data relay
- Operator: Roscosmos

Spacecraft properties
- Spacecraft type: Luna
- Launch mass: 2,100 kg (4,600 lb)

Start of mission
- Launch date: 2028 (planned)
- Rocket: Soyuz-2.1b / Fregat-M
- Launch site: Vostochny Site 1S
- Contractor: Roscosmos

Orbital parameters
- Reference system: Selenocentric orbit
- Regime: Polar orbit
- Periselene altitude: 50 km
- Aposelene altitude: 80 km

Moon orbiter

Luna 26 (Luna-Resurs-Orbiter or Luna-Resurs O) is a planned lunar polar orbiter, part of the Luna-Glob program, by Roscosmos. In addition to its scientific role, the Luna 26 orbiter would also function as a telecom relay between Earth and Russian landed assets. This mission was announced in November 2014, and its launch is planned for 2028 on a Soyuz-2.1b launch vehicle.

== Overview ==
The Luna 26 orbiter mission has been in planning since at least 2011. Originally it was envisioned to be launched to the Moon together with the lunar lander Luna 27 which will land on the South Pole–Aitken basin, an unexplored area on the far side of the Moon, but because of mass limitations, they will be launched separately. The orbiter's mass is about 2100 kg.

The objective of the orbiter is to locate and quantify natural lunar resources that can be exploited by future landed missions. After completion of its primary mission, the spacecraft's orbit will be raised to about 500 km altitude to study cosmic rays.

As of 2026, Luna 26 is expected to be launched in 2028.

== International collaboration ==
The European Space Agency (ESA) had intended to contribute to this and other Luna-Glob missions in the manner of communications, precision landing, hazard avoidance, drilling, sampling, sample analysis and ground support. ESA cooperation with Russia on Luna 26 was discontinued on 13 April 2022 as a consequence of the Russian invasion of Ukraine.

As of October 2017, the U.S. space agency NASA was negotiating and assessing a potential collaboration with the Luna-Glob missions Luna 25 through Luna 28.

In September 2019, the China National Space Administration (CNSA) and Roscosmos signed two agreements on scientific cooperation and coordination between Luna 26 and the upcoming Chang'e 7 lunar polar orbiter.

== Scientific payload ==
The scientific payload on board the orbiter is composed of fourteen instruments that will be fabricated by Russia and by some European partners. The payload will study the lunar surface and the environment around the Moon, including the solar wind, and high-energy cosmic rays. In 2017, the possibility to carry some NASA instruments was discussed. Luna 26 will also scout landing sites for the planned Luna 27 lander mission.

The Lunar Orbital Radio Detector (LORD) was planned to be carried on Luna 26 but was removed in 2016.

== Fate ==
Following the failure of the Luna 25 mission, the fate of the Luna 26 orbiter was put into question. The entire Roscosmos leadership team from Luna 25 was replaced and it was speculated that Luna 26 as it exists would be scrapped in favor of another attempt at the Luna 25 lander. Ultimately on August 22, 2025, the Russian Academy of Sciences stated that the Luna-26 orbiter, as originally designed, would still occur, however, that its launch date had been delayed to 2028.

== See also ==
- Exploration of the Moon
