= Zhang Zhi =

Zhang Zhi may refer to:

- Zhang Zhi (calligrapher) (died 192), Chinese calligrapher
- Zhang Zhi (engineer) (born 1964), Chinese rocket engineer
- Zhang Zhi (footballer) (born 1989), Chinese footballer

== See also ==
- Zhang Ji (poet from Hubei) (fl. 8th century), Tang dynasty poet from Hubei
- Zhang Ji (poet from Jiangnan) (c. 766–c. 830), Tang dynasty poet from Jiangnan
