= Mars-Aster =

Proposed Russian space mission

Mars-Aster was a proposed Russian mission for a Mars rover. It was part of exploration plans outlined by the Space Council of the Russian Academy of Sciences in 1997. The project was delayed in the mid-2000s in favor of Phobos-Grunt and Luna-Glob, and it has not been approved since then.
