= YF-215 =

Chinese liquid-fuel rocket engine

- Country of origin: China
- Designer: Academy of Aerospace Liquid Propulsion Technology
- Associated LV: Long March 9
- Status: In development

Liquid-fuel engine
- Propellant: LOX / CH_{4}
- Cycle: Full-flow staged combustion

Configuration
- Chamber: 1

Performance
- Thrust, sea-level: 2,000 kilonewtons (450,000 lb_{f})

The YF-215 is a methalox rocket engine (burning liquid methane and liquid oxygen) in a full-flow staged combustion cycle (FFSC). The engine is under development for the super-heavy launch vehicle Long March 9.

== History ==
The Academy of Aerospace Liquid Propulsion Technology began studies of a 200-tonne-class liquid oxygen/methane engine around 2010, with the full-flow staged combustion configuration selected and the overall design finalized around 2022. A 2023 paper from the institute described a sea-level thrust of 2,000 kN (450,000 lbf) and a chamber pressure of 25 MPa (3,600 psi).

A successful ignition test of the engine's gas generator was conducted on 12 May 2023 at the Baolongyu test centre near Xi'an.

A Long March 9 design reported in November 2024 proposed 30 YF-215 engines for its reusable first stage.

== See also ==
- SpaceX Raptor
