= SNIPE (satellite) =

South Korean satellite launched in 2023

- Mission type: Space weather observations

Spacecraft properties
- Manufacturer: Korea Astronomy and Space Science Institute
- Launch mass: 10 kilograms (22 lb)

Start of mission
- Launch date: 25 May 2023 UTC+9
- Rocket: Nuri (KSLV-II)
- Launch site: Naro Space Center

SNIPE (Small scale magNetospheric and Ionospheric Plasma Experiments, Korean: 도요샛) is a CubeSat of South Korea. SNIPE 1, 2, 3, and 4 were launched with the third launch of Nuri on May 25, 2023. There is a plan to conduct joint research with NASA using data observed by SNIPE.

== Design ==
SNIPE (Small scale magNetospheric and Ionospheric Plasma Experiment) is a CubeSat developed by the Korea Astronomy and Space Science Institute (KASI) for five years to observe space weather. It is the world's first CubeSat to be equipped with a formation flight function that can change the distance between satellites and flight pattern, allowing for precise observation of the space environment. Four 10kg cube satellites are designed to fly in a horizontal, vertical, and formation configuration to observe space weather, including space storms, and their microstructures.

== Mission ==
It has the mission of observing the temporal and spatial changes of plasma by utilizing multiple satellites to overcome the limitations of observing the fine structure of space weather using a single satellite. The satellite group flies in a north-south direction in a single orbital plane to observe the temporal changes of space weather. There are also plans to conduct joint research with NASA using data observed by SNIPE.

After being launched on board Nuri (KSLV-II) on May 25, 2023, it achieved the target altitude of 550km and the target launch speed of 7.58km/s without error. However, the SNIPE 3 (also known as Dasol) failed to eject. Subsequent analysis concluded that the ejection tube door on the third stage of the Nuri rocket did not open. There was no problem with the electrical system from the launch vehicle to the ejection tube.

Unit 4 (also known as Raon) sent a beacon signal to Earth. At approximately 6:24 PM on May 26, 2023, the Daejeon ground station successfully received Unit 4's beacon signal.

== See also ==
- Danuri
- Nuri (rocket)
- CubeSat
