= Lunar Orbital Radio Detector =

The Lunar Orbital Radio Detector (LORD) is a cancelled instrument that was intended to conduct astronomical observations as part of the Russian Luna 26 lunar orbiter mission. LORD was designed to observe Askaryan radiation; high energy cosmic particles interacting with lunar regolith can produce radiation detectable as radio waves. LORD was specifically targeting radiation caused by ultra-high-energy cosmic ray (UHECR) and ultra high energy neutrino (UHEN).

In 2016, the decision to remove LORD from Luna-26 was made as other on board equipment and cable network would cause radio interference with the instrument.

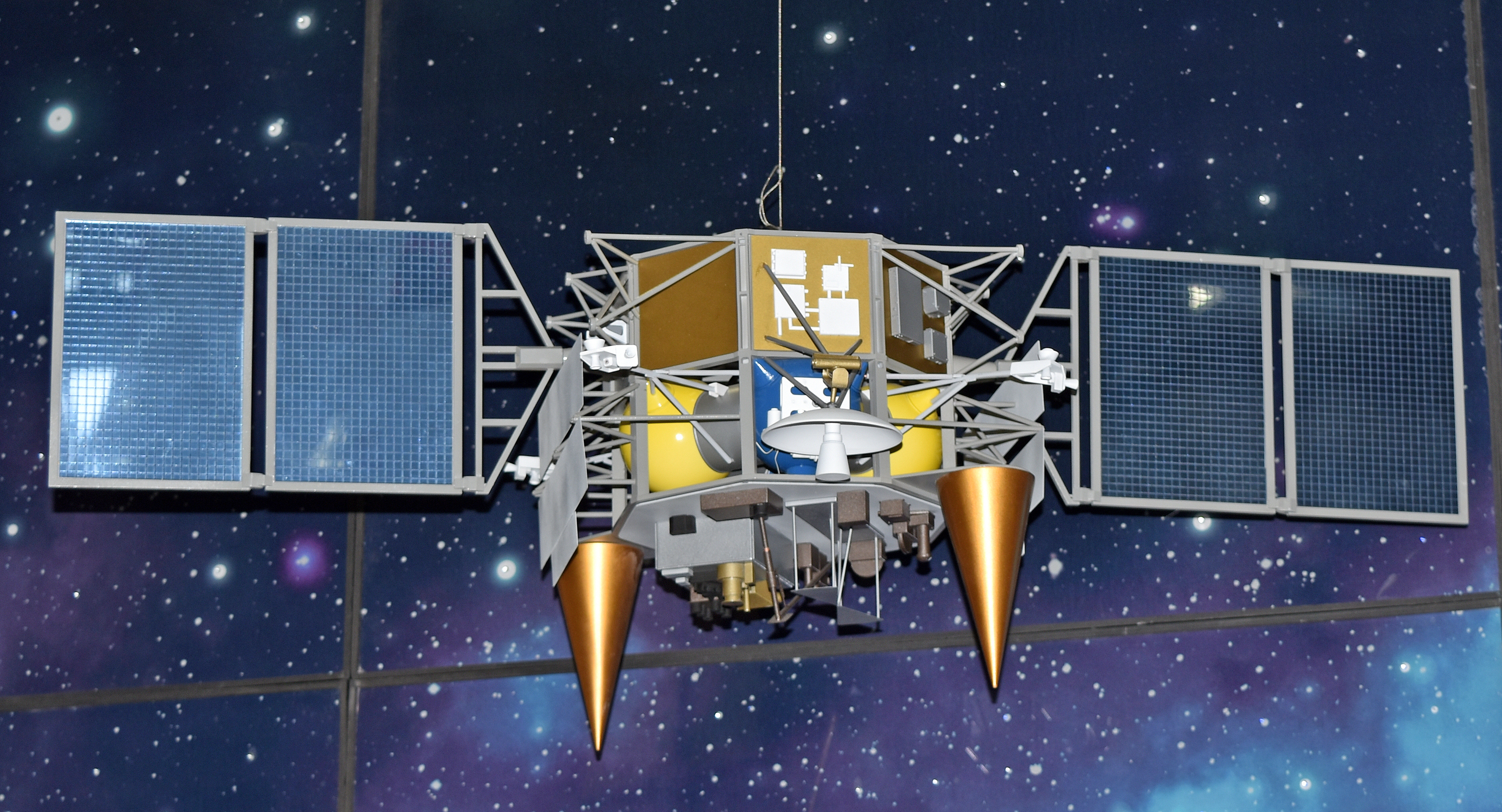
An older model of Luna 26. LORD is the two bronze-coloured conical instruments at the bottom side.

== See also ==
- Dark Ages Radio Explorer
- Hongmeng project
