= Zhang Zhi (engineer) =

- 张智
- Born: 1964 (age 61–62); China
- Education: Beihang University
- Scientific career
- Fields: Rocket
- Workplaces: China Academy of Launch Vehicle Technology

Chinese name
- Simplified Chinese: 张智
- Traditional Chinese: 張智
Transcriptions
Standard Mandarin
- Hanyu Pinyin: Zhāng Zhì

Zhang Zhi (Chinese: 张智; born 1964) is a Chinese rocket engineer who is the chief designer of Long March 10. He previously served as the chief designer of Long March 2F and Long March 9.

== Biography ==
Born in 1964, Zhang graduated from Beihang University.

After university in 1987, Zhang was assigned to the China Academy of Launch Vehicle Technology, where he began to engage in pre research work on the China Manned Space Program. In 1992, he was responsible for the overall development of the launch escape system for the Long March 2F. He rose to become chief designer of Long March 2F in August 2014 and later chief designer of Long March 9. He is now the chief designer of Long March 10.

Academic offices
Preceded by ?	Chief Designer of Long March 2F; 2014–2021	Succeeded by Rong Yi
