= Nuri (rocket) =

First South Korean orbital launch vehicle developed domestically

Nuri (KSLV-II)
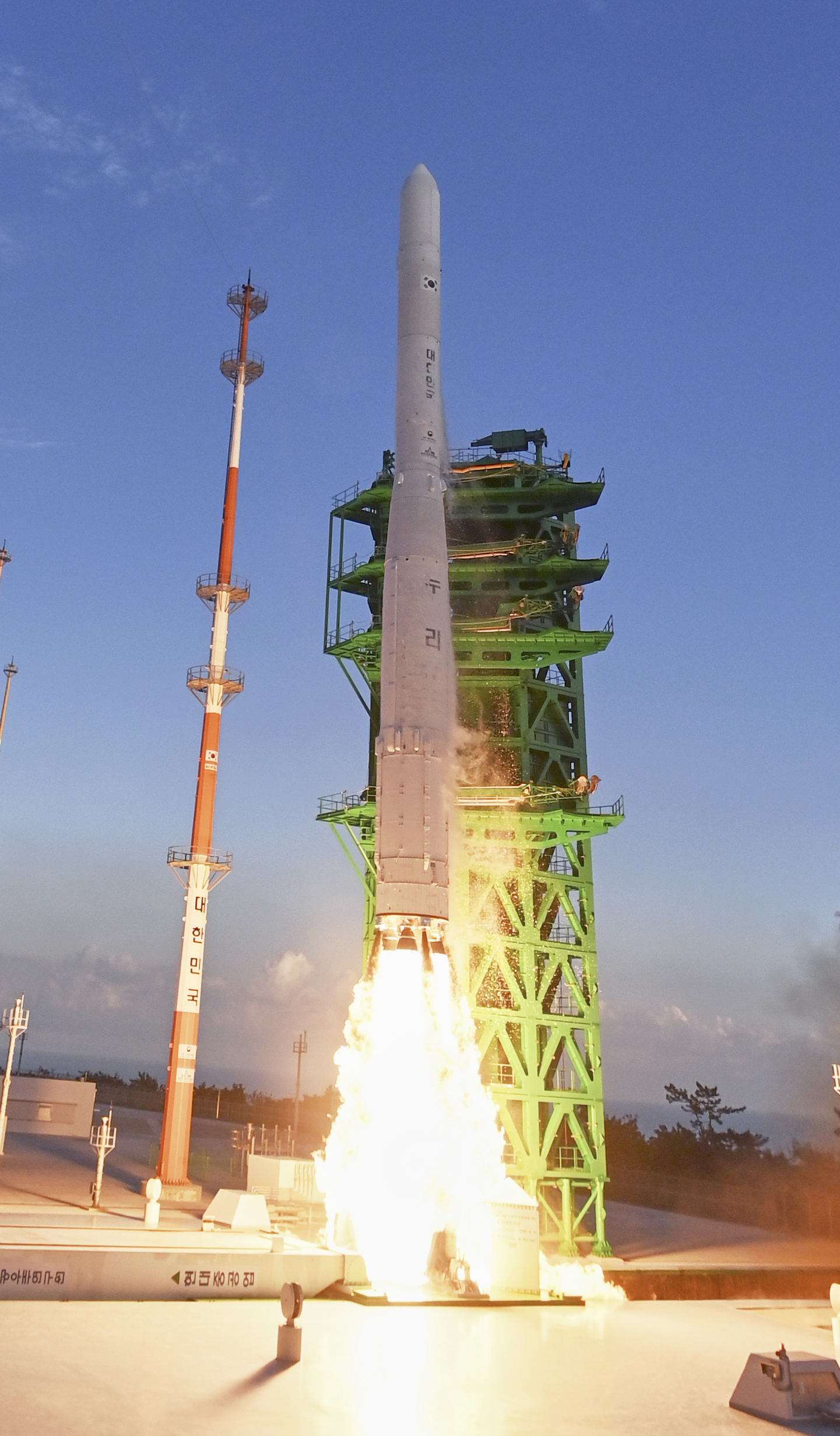
- KSLV-II Nuri launching from the Launch Pad 2 at Naro Space Center, 21 October 2021.
- Function: Small/Medium-lift launch vehicle
- Manufacturer: Korea Aerospace Research Institute (design); Korea Aerospace Industries (final assembly); Hanwha Aerospace (engine manufacturing); Hyundai Heavy Industries (launchpad)
- Country of origin: South Korea
- Project cost: ₩1.96 trillion (spaceport included)

Size
- Height: 47.2 m (155 ft)
- Diameter: 3.5 m (11 ft)
- Mass: 200,000 kg (440,000 lb)
- Stages: 3

Capacity

Payload to LEO
- Altitude: 200 km (120 mi)
- Mass: 3,300 kg (7,300 lb)

Payload to SSO
- Altitude: 700 km (430 mi)
- Mass: 1,900 kg (4,200 lb)

Payload to GTO
- Mass: 1,000 kg (2,200 lb)

Launch history
- Status: Active
- Launch sites: Naro, LC-2
- Total launches: 5
- Success(es): 4
- Failure: 1
- First flight: 21 October 2021
- Last flight: 7 October 2026 (most recent)

First stage
- Height: 21.6 m (71 ft)
- Diameter: 3.5 m (11 ft)
- Powered by: 4 × KRE-075
- Maximum thrust: SL: 2,942 kN (661,000 lb_{f}) vac: 3,380 kN (759,000 lb_{f})
- Specific impulse: SL: 261.7 s (2.566 km/s) vac: 298.6 s (2.928 km/s)
- Burn time: 127 seconds
- Propellant: LOX / Jet A-1

Second stage
- Diameter: 2.6 m (8 ft 6 in)
- Powered by: 1 × KRE-075
- Maximum thrust: 788 kN (177,000 lb_{f})
- Specific impulse: 315.4 s (3.093 km/s)
- Burn time: 148 seconds
- Propellant: LOX / Jet A-1

Third stage
- Height: 3.5 m (11 ft)
- Diameter: 2.6 m (8 ft 6 in)
- Powered by: 1 × KRE-007
- Maximum thrust: 68.7 kN (15,400 lb_{f})
- Specific impulse: 325.1 s (3.188 km/s)
- Burn time: 498 seconds
- Propellant: LOX / Jet A-1

Nuri (Korean: 누리; lit. 'world'), also known as KSLV-II (Korean Space Launch Vehicle-II), is an expendable, three-stage-to-orbit, small-lift launch vehicle, (Note: Under the Roscosmos classification. It would be a medium-lift launch vehicle under the NASA classification.) the second one developed by South Korea, and the successor to Naro-1 (KSLV-1) It is developed by Korea Aerospace Research Institute (KARI). All three stages use Korean developed launch vehicle engines, making Nuri the first orbital launch vehicle entirely developed and manufactured in South Korea.

== History ==
The South Korean government decided to fund the development of relatively cheap and reliable rockets competitive enough for the commercial launch market.

On 21 October 2021, Nuri made its initial orbital launch attempt at 08:00 UTC and it launched a 1,500 kg (3,300 lb) dummy satellite payload into what was planned to be a 700 km (430 mi) Sun-synchronous orbit (SSO). However, despite the payload reaching the targeted apogee (700 km), the third stage shut down about 46 seconds earlier than planned and the payload did not achieve orbital speed.

Nuri made its second flight on 21 June 2022, 07:00 UTC, with a payload of 1,500 kg (3,300 lb) including a 1,300 kg (2,900 lb) dummy satellite payload and a 180 kg (400 lb) performance verification satellite (PVSAT) including four cube satellites. The second launch was successful, putting all the satellites onto the 700 km (430 mi) Sun-synchronous orbit (SSO). As a result of this launch, South Korea became the seventh country in the world with the ability to put a satellite with a mass of at least one ton, into orbit.

After the two test launches, Nuri showed higher than expected performance, increasing its payload from 1,500 kg (3,300 Ib) to 1,900 kg (4,200 Ib).

Nuri is the first launch vehicle developed with domestic, South Korean, technology throughout all processes, including design, manufacturing, and testing. With its successful launch, South Korea became the seventh country in the world to have a medium-sized liquid-propellant rocket engine over 75 tons.

== Specification ==
The second launch of KSLV-II at the Naro Space Center, 21 June 2022

Nuri (KSLV-II) is a three-stage launch vehicle. The first stage booster uses four KRE-075 SL engines generating 266.4 tons of thrust with a specific impulse of 289.1 seconds. The second stage booster uses a single KRE-075 Vacuum engine, which has a wider nozzle for increased efficiency in vacuum with a specific impulse of 315.4 seconds. The third stage booster uses one KRE-007 engine with a specific impulse of 325.1 seconds. Both engine models use Jet A-1 as fuel and liquid oxygen (LOX) as oxidizer.

== Development ==
When technology development for Nuri began by October 2010, the overall design goal was to develop a new expendable medium-lift launch vehicle that was entirely South Korean. Nuri first reached orbit in June 2022. The total cost of the development program was approximately US$1.5 billion.

=== Engine development ===
- In March 2014, the first combustion test of the 7-ton class combustor, was successfully completed, and the total assembly and initial ignition test of the KRE-007 engine started in July 2015. In addition, the first phase of the project was completed with the addition of a three-stage engine combustion test facility and a combustor combustion test facility. However, the problem of combustion instability in the KRE-075 burner required rework.

The third launch on 25 May 2023

- Hanwha Techwin Co. signed on 25 January 2016, a 14.1 billion won (US$11.77 million) contract with the Korea Aerospace Research Institute (KARI) to produce both types of liquid propellant rocket engines for Nuri.
- On 8 January 2016, the second phase of the project was carried out to overcome the difficulties of combustor combustion instability and welding technology of the liquid engine fuel tank, and a combustion test of the KRE-075 engine for a few seconds was successful.
- On 3 May 2016, the KRE-075 engine underwent a 1.5 second long spark ignition test. It was later fired for 75 seconds on 8 June 2016. Following these successes, on 20 July 2016, at 1:39 pm, the final target combustion time of 145 seconds (147 seconds) was achieved. During the ground test, the engine performed nominally, with all values such as combustion safety and combustion thrust within the expected error range. During an actual launch, the first stage engine is expected to burn for 127 seconds and the second stage engine for 143 seconds.
- Starting from October 2016 to October 2021, there have been over 184 combustion tests of the second prototype KRE-075 engine.

==== KRE-075 sea level engine ====
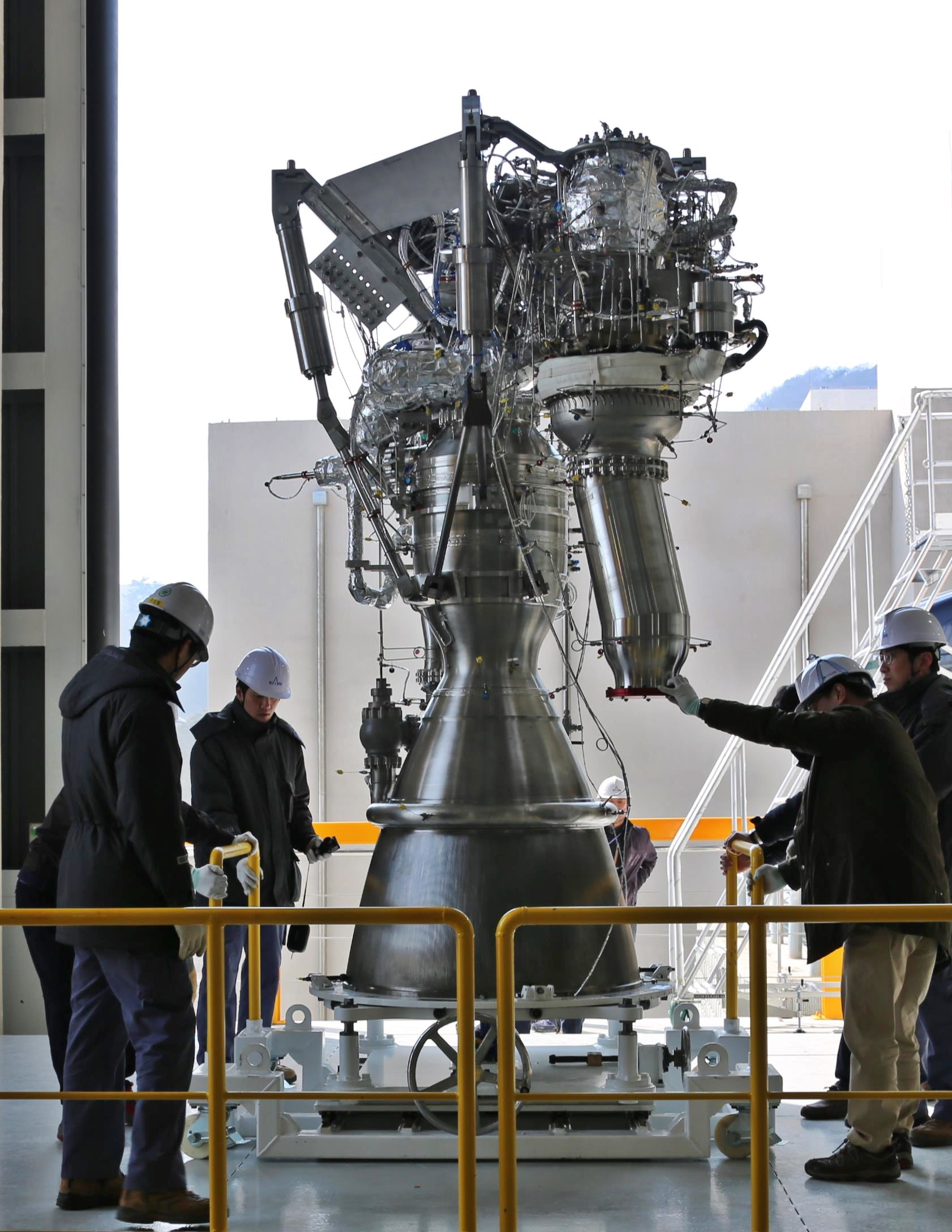
KRE-075 engine

Fuel	Jet A-1 / LOX
Thrust	SL: 2,942 kN (661,000 lb_{f}), vac: 3,380 kN (759,000 lb_{f})
Specific impulse	SL: 261.7 s (2.566 km/s), vac: 298.6 s (2.928 km/s)
Height	2.9 m (9 ft 6 in)
Diameter	2 m (6 ft 7 in)
Cycle	Gas generator

The KRE-075 engine was developed in April 2016 after the 30 tf engine development program.

==== KRE-075 vacuum engine ====
Fuel	Jet A-1 / LOX
Thrust	3,570 kN (803,000 lb_{f})
Specific impulse	315.4 s (3.093 km/s)
Cycle	Gas generator

==== KRE-007 engine ====
Fuel	Jet A-1 / LOX
Thrust	310 kN (70,000 lb_{f})
Specific impulse	325.1 s (3.188 km/s)
Cycle	Gas generator

=== KSLV-II TLV ===
The Test Launch Vehicle (TLV) was a single stage launch vehicle (with a planned two stage version), qualifying the performance of the KRE-075 engine which powers the KSLV-II. The TLV was 25.8 m (85 ft) in length, 2.6 m (8 ft 6 in) in diameter, and with a mass of 52.1 tons. The main-stage liquid rocket propellant engine was fully gimballed. With the 2nd stage engine installed, the two-stage version of TLV could perform as a small satellite launch vehicle.

==== 2018 flight ====
Wet Mass	52.1 tons
Dry Mass	38 tons
Height	25.8 m
Diameter	2.6 m
Stages	1
Engine	1 KRE-075
Payload	mass simulator

The TLV was launched from the Naro Space Center in Goheung, South Jeolla Province, on 28 November 2018. The main objective of the first suborbital flight was for the single-stage rocket's main engine to burn 140 seconds, reaching a 100 km altitude before splashing down in the sea between Jeju Island and Okinawa Island.

The maiden flight was first delayed from 25 October 2018 for one month, due to abnormal readings detected in the launch vehicle propellant pressurization system. The test flight was then rescheduled for 28 November 2018, at 07:00 UTC (16:00 KST). No payload was to be placed into orbit.

The launch of the TLV while deemed successful with its main engine burning for 151 seconds in a 10-minute flight, was not broadcast live. After reaching a maximum altitude of 209 km (130 mi), the launch vehicle stage splashed down in the Pacific Ocean, 429 km (267 mi) southeast of Jeju Island.

As the TLV was meant to serve as a test craft, and as the flight ended in a success, there was not a second TLV launch.

=== Canceled future version (KSLV-IIA) ===
As of 2020, further improvements were planned to be added after the success of KSLV-II program, under the name of KSLV-IIA. With mainly increasing the thrust of the KRE-075 of the first stage from 735 kN (165,000 lb_{f}) to 804 kN (181,000 lb_{f}) and specific impulse from 261.7 seconds to 315.4 seconds, this would have increased the capacity of a payload to 700 km SSO to increase from 1900 kg to 2200 kg. The overall size of the rocket was also planned to grow, to the height of 54 m and wet mass of 232 tons.

Ministry of Science and ICT canceled the plan in 2021, criticizing it for lacking of challenge, and not reflecting the abolition of South Korea Ballistic Missile Range Guidelines. Subsequently, the ministry decided to develop KSLV-III instead of upgrading KSLV-II.

== Usage ==
Nuri will be used in launching several Earth observation satellites, such as KOMPSAT, medium-class satellites and LEO reconnaissance satellites. It is planned to support South Korea's Moon exploration mission to send orbiters and landers. Nuri will be South Korea's first launch vehicle to enter the commercial launch service market. The launch cost is estimated to be around US$30 million, which is cheaper than its Asian counterparts. This will allow for South Korea to provide cheap launch services for Southeast Asia countries.

South Korea plans to launch a high-weight rocket named KSLV-3 in 2030 instead of improving the KSLV-2. The decision is aimed at narrowing the technology gap with other countries.

Instead, it plans to develop a low-cost rocket that miniaturizes the KSLV-2 and is considering launching a military satellite to monitor North Korea.

== Launches ==
Flight No.	Date / time (UTC)	Payload	Payload mass	Orbit	Customer	Launch outcome
1	October 21, 2021, 08:00	Nuri Test Payload 1	1,500 kg (3,300 lb)	LEO (planned)	KARI	Failure
1	Third stage shut down 46 seconds early, failed to reach orbit					
2	June 21, 2022, 07:00	Nuri Test Payload 2 (1.3 tons), PVSAT (180 kg, with 4 CubeSats)	1,500 kg (3,300 lb)	SSO	KARI	Success
3	May 25, 2023, 09:24	NEXTSat-2, SNIPE 1,2,3,4, JLC-101-v1-2, Lumir-T1, KSAT3U	240 kg (530 lb)	SSO	KAIST, KASI	Success
4	November 26, 2025, 16:13	CAS500 3, Domestic device and component verification satellite 1, 11 CubeSats	655.7 kg (1,446 lb)	SSO	KARI	Success
5	October 7, 2026, 03:25	10 CubeSats, NEONSAT 2,3,4,5,6	1,071 kg (2,361 lb)	SSO	KARI	Success
6	2027	NEXTSat 3, Domestic Device and Component Verification Satellite 3, NEONSAT 7,8,9,10,11		SSO	KARI	Planned

== See also ==
- KSLV-I
- KSLV-III
- Naro Space Center
- KARI
- SNIPE
- Vega
- PSLV
- South Korean space program
- Comparison of orbital launcher families
- Comparison of orbital launch systems
- Comparison of orbital rocket engines
