= Yenisei (rocket) =

Russian super heavy-lift launch rocket

- Function: Super heavy-lift launch vehicle
- Manufacturer: RSC Energia
- Country of origin: Russia
- Project cost: 1.5 trillion (≈US$18.2 billion)

Size
- Diameter: 4.1 m (13 ft)
- Mass: 3,167 t (6,982,000 lb)
- Stages: 5

Capacity

Payload to LEO
- Mass: 103 t (227,000 lb)

Payload to TLI
- Mass: 27 t (60,000 lb)

Associated rockets
- Comparable: Falcon Heavy; Long March 9; Space Launch System; SpaceX Starship

Launch history
- Status: In development

Boosters (First stage) – Irtysh
- No. boosters: 4
- Powered by: 1 × RD-171MV
- Propellant: LOX / RP-1

Boosters (Second stage) – Irtysh
- No. boosters: 2
- Powered by: 1 × RD-171MV
- Propellant: LOX / RP-1

Third stage (core) – Volga
- Powered by: 1 × RD-180
- Propellant: LOX / RP-1

Fourth stage – KVTK
- Powered by: 2 × RD-0146
- Propellant: LOX / LH_{2}

Fifth stage – DM-03
- Powered by: 1 × RD-58MF
- Propellant: LOX / RP-1

Yenisei (Russian: Енисей, lit. 'Yenisey'), project name RN STK-1 (Russian: ракета-носитель сверхтяжёлого класса, romanized: raketa-nositel' sverkhtyazhologo klassa, lit. 'super heavy-lift launch vehicle') is a rocket being developed by the Russian space industry. The main developer is RSC Energia.

It is being developed within the framework of the federal target program "Creation of a super-heavy class space rocket complex". The program was given a budget of 600 billion rubles (USD ~$6 billion). It is the main rocket of the Russian lunar exploration program.

The final design for the rocket was expected to be complete by autumn 2021, but the program appears to have been paused or stopped just before this expected completion date.

In 2024, it was announced that the project will resume in 2025.

The first launch was expected to happen in 2033 from the Vostochny Cosmodrome.

Based on the Yenisei launch vehicle, the Don launch vehicle (RN STK-2) is being developed by adding another stage.

Anatoly Zak
- RussianSpaceWeb.com
- Roadmap with two rockets on the right Yenisei and Don respectively
- "Irtysh" "Soyuz-5" is a basis for the first stage
- "Volga" "Soyuz-6" will be used as a basis for second stage
- "Yenisei"
- "Yenisei" (cutaway)
- "Don"

== Development ==
The rocket got its name at the end of 2018, before that it was called "RN STK" (super-heavy launch vehicle).

=== Chronology of development. ===
Event	Date
Start of work on the creation of the RD-171MV engine	June 2017
Start of research work on RD-0150 engine	June 2017
Preliminary estimate of the cost of R&D on the RN STK	October 2017
Decree of the President of the Russian Federation on the creation of the RN STK	January 2018
Official name for RN STK	January 2019
Feasibility study of the RN STK project	Spring 2019
Draft design	2018-2019
R&D, design, and construction works	2020-2028
Flight tests	from 2028

== Planned events ==
- October 2021 - end of technical design.
- 2026-2028 - construction and commissioning of infrastructure for a super-heavy launch vehicle and a medium-class rocket for launching crewed spacecraft from the Vostochny cosmodrome.

== Design ==
The first stage will consist of 6 blocks. Each block will be based on the first stage of the planned Irtysh / Soyuz-5 rocket with an RD-171MV engine.

Anatoly Zak
- RussianSpaceWeb.com
- Roadmap with two rockets on the right Yenisei and Don respectively
- "Irtysh" "Soyuz-5" is a basis for the first stage
- "Volga" "Soyuz-6" will be used as a basis for second stage
- "Yenisei"
- "Yenisei" (cutaway)
- "Don"

The second stage will consist of one block - matching the first stage of Soyuz-6 with RD-180 as the engine.

The upper stage will be KVTK.

Accelerating braking unit: Block DM

=== Proposed variants ===
Name of a rocket	Yenisei	Don
Type	Stage one	Stage two
First launch	2028	2032–2035
First stage	6xRD-171MV	6xRD-171MV
Second stage	RD-180	RD-180
Third stage	-	2×RD-0150
Upper stage	KVTK, 2×RD-0146	KVTK, 2×RD-0146
Accelerating braking unit	DM, 11D58MF	DM, 11D58MF
Height (max.)		
Launch weight, t	3167	3281
Thrust (at ground level)		
Thrust-to-weight ratio		
Payload (LEO 200 km), t	103	140
Payload (GTO 5500 km), t		
Payload (GEO 35,786 km), t	26	29.5
Payload to TLI, t	27	33

== Flight tests ==
Flight tests will take place in two stages from 2028 to 2035.

The first stage of testing will take place in 2028–2032. It involves the launch of a crewed spacecraft, a lunar take-off and landing complex (LVPK) and other payloads on the trajectory of the flight around the Moon and circumlunar orbits in order to work out the elements of a crewed complex, create a station in the orbit of the Moon, and land on the lunar surface.

The second stage of testing will take place in 2032–2035. It is planned to launch LVPK and other uncrewed payloads for the construction and operation of a base on the lunar surface. In addition, this stage involves participation in international programs related to the study of Mars.

== Applications ==
The super-heavy rocket is supposed to be used in the Russian lunar program, since the carrying capacity of the Angara-A5V launch vehicle (37.5 tons to LEO) is insufficient for these purposes.

=== Lunar program payloads ===
- 20-ton Orel spacecraft.
- 27-ton lunar landing and takeoff complex (LPVK).
- 32-ton lunar base module.

=== Satellite constellation ===
- Spacecraft up to 30 tons to geostationary orbit
- Space telescopes 30-40 tons to the L2 Lagrange point in the Sun-Earth system

== See also ==
- Space Launch System
- Falcon Heavy
- Starship
- Long March 9
