= KRE-075 =

South Korean rocket engine

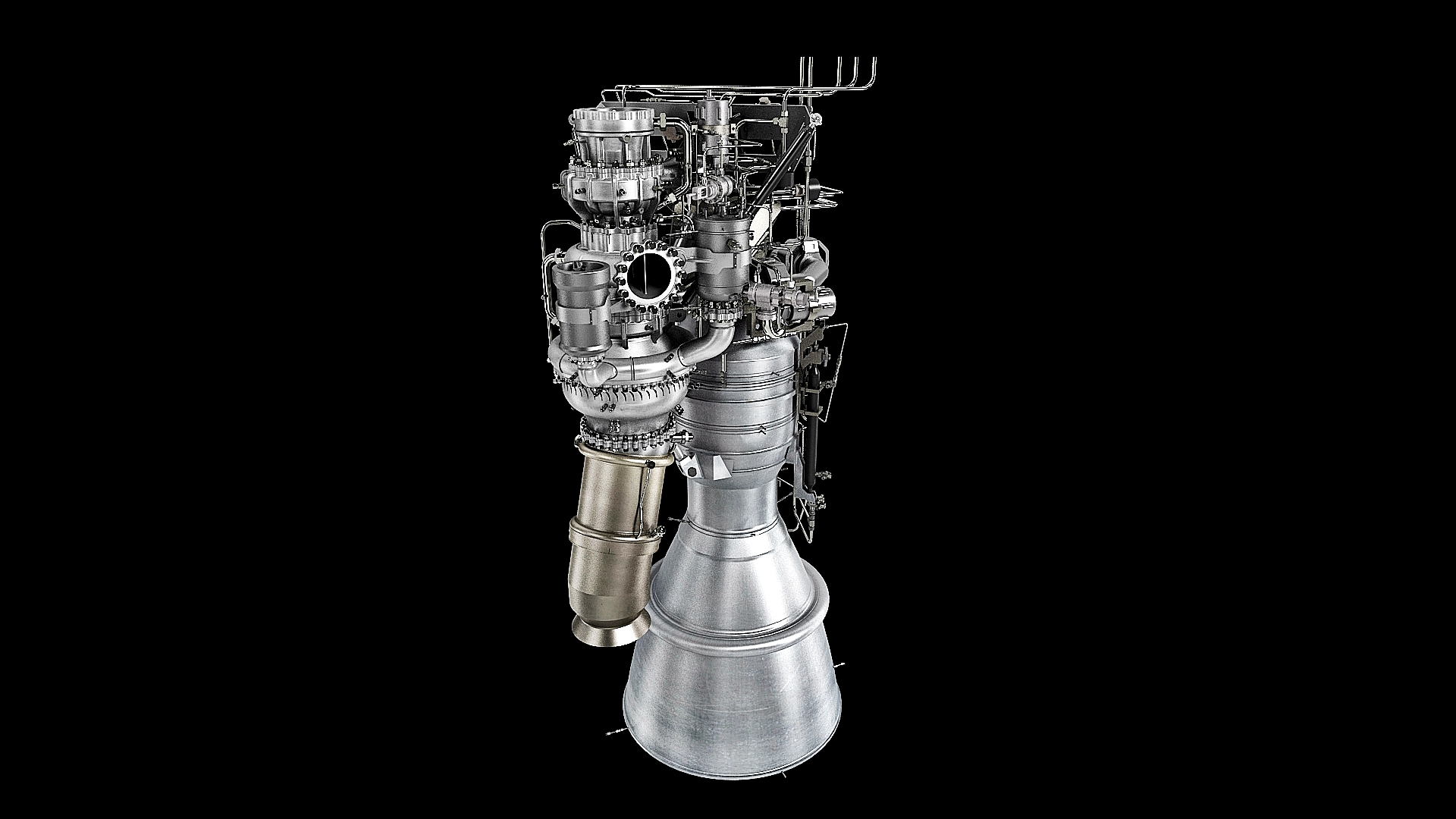
- Country of origin: South Korea
- Designer: Korea Aerospace Research Institute
- Manufacturer: Hanwha Aerospace

Liquid-fuel engine
- Propellant: LOX / Jet A-1
- Mixture ratio: 2.45
- Cycle: Open-type gas generator

Configuration
- Nozzle ratio: 94.5

Performance
- Thrust, vacuum: 1st stage: 735.5 kN (165,300 lb_{f}); 2nd stage: 788 kN (177,000 lb_{f})
- Chamber pressure: 7.0 MPa (1,020 psi)
- Specific impulse, vacuum: 1st stage: 298.6 s (2.928 km/s); 2nd stage: 315.4 s (3.093 km/s)
- Specific impulse, sea-level: 261.7 s (2.566 km/s)
- Mass flow: 0.822 kg/s (108.7 lb/min)
- Burn time: 1st stage: 127 seconds; 2nd stage: 148 seconds

Dimensions
- Length: 3.4 m (11 ft)
- Diameter: 810 mm (32 in)

Used in
- Nuri first and second stage

KRE-075 is a 75-ton thrust liquid rocket engine developed by Korea Aerospace Research Institute. It was used as the first stage engine of the Nuri test launch vehicle in 2018 and as the first and second stage engines of the Nuri in 2021.

== Development ==
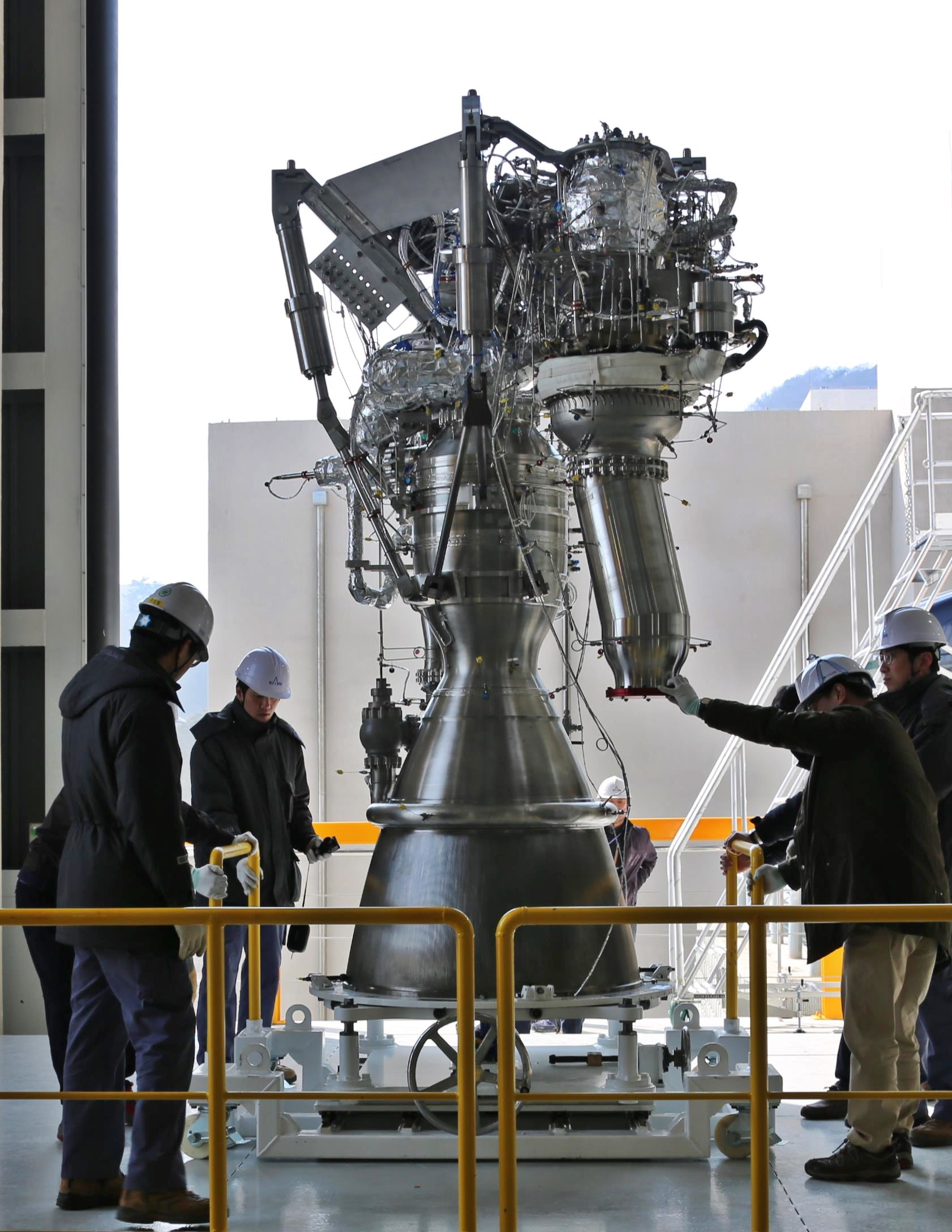
KRE-075

The KRE-075 was developed in 2010 under the leadership of the Korea Aerospace Research Institute. The Hanwha Aerospace participated in the early stages of the project by building the engine, turbo pump, and test equipment.

KARI reported at the government space development promotion working committee meeting held on June 29, 2016 that the launch schedule for the test launch vehicle, originally scheduled for the end of 2017, would be postponed by 10 months. There was an issue with the combustion instability of the engine, and at the time, the combustion instability issue had been resolved to some extent.

In October 2021, Hanwha Aerospace unveiled this engine to the general public at the Seoul ADEX 2021 exhibition held at Seoul Air Base in Seongnam, Gyeonggi Province.

== Test ==
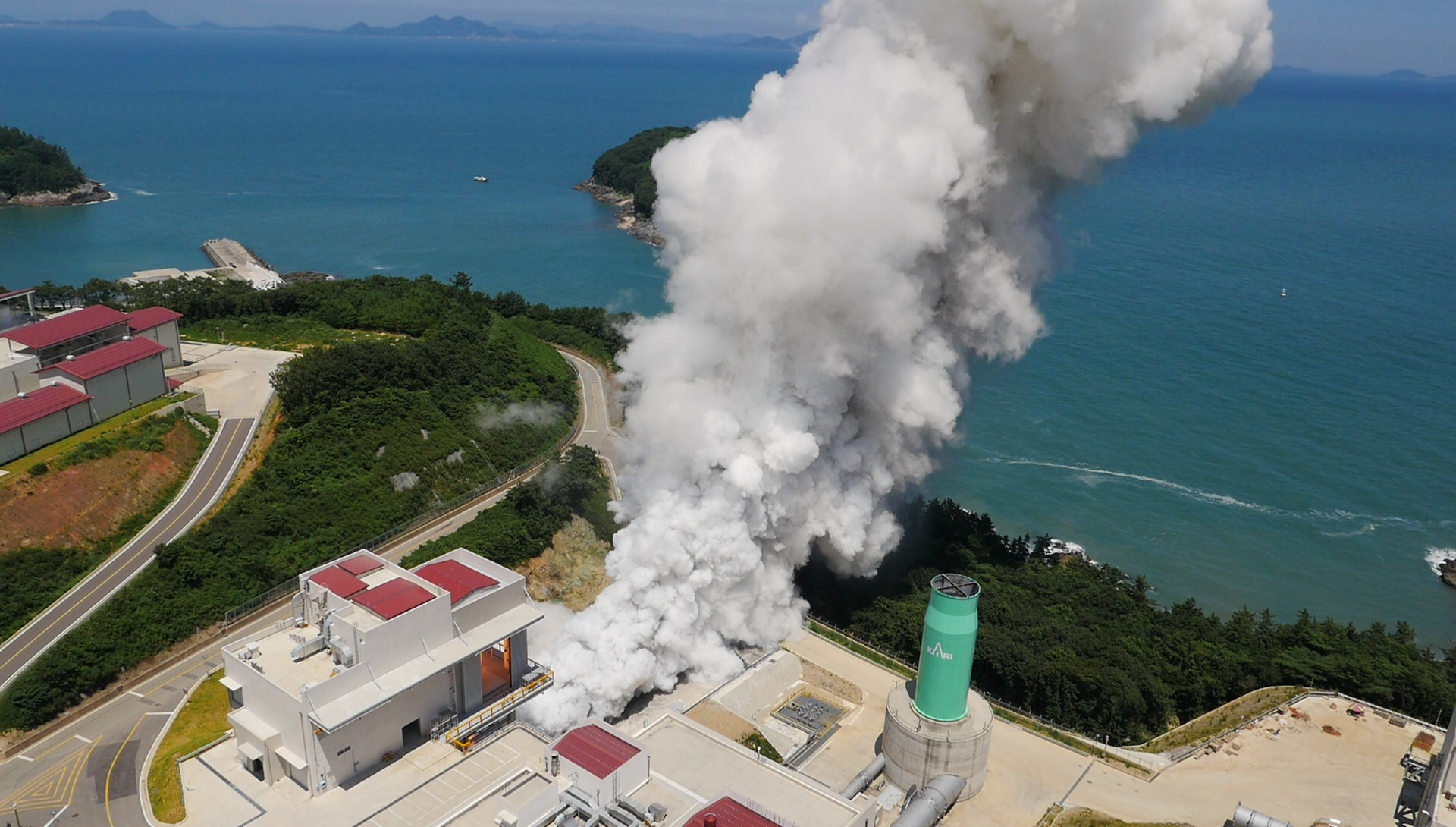
145-second combustion test

The mission target combustion time of the first stage engine of Nuri, which consists of three stages, was designed to be approximately 120 seconds, and the mission target combustion time of the second stage engine was designed to be approximately 140 seconds.

The first combustion test was successful on May 3, 2016 for 1.5 seconds, and the combustion test was successful on June 8 for 75 seconds.

On November 28, 2018, the Nuri test launch vehicle flew, burning for the target combustion time of 140 seconds. A total of 10 engines were manufactured up to the launch of the test launch vehicle, and 100 cumulative combustion tests were conducted for 8,326 seconds. The engine used in the test launch vehicle is No. 7.

On January 28, 2021, a comprehensive combustion test of the propulsion system was conducted for 30 seconds using the First stage certification model according to the same automatic launch software command as the actual launch. In this test, it was confirmed that the fuel and oxidizer from the 1st stage propellant tank were normally supplied to four 75-ton liquid engines that were clustered, and that normal combustion was conducted and controlled.

== Design ==
Initially, it was designed with performance in mind and was made 25% heavier than the target, but through repeated engine combustion tests, the design was improved to reduce weight, ultimately reducing the weight significantly.

It was designed to withstand both the extremely low temperature of liquid oxygen reaching −180 degrees Celsius and the extremely high temperature of 3300 degrees Celsius generated during combustion.

The engine uses regular Jet-A1 aviation kerosene jet fuel rather than the more expensive and more highly-refined RP-1 kerosene typically used as a rocket propellant.

== Use ==
Nuri's first stage liquid engine consists of four KRE-075 engines clustered together to produce 300 tons of thrust, which can burn over a ton of oxidizer and fuel per second to push a huge launch vehicle skyward at high speed. One engine is used as the second stage liquid engine. The third stage consists of one 7-ton engine.

The engine generates propulsion by combustion by reacting with kerosene and liquid oxygen at −183 °C. When combustion begins, the temperature inside the engine combustion chamber soars to 3,000 °C. Fluids with extreme temperature differences between −183 °C and 3,000 °C must operate within a confined engine space. It burns 255 kg of fuel and oxidizer per second.

== See also ==
- South Korean space program
