= Luna-Glob =

Moon exploration program by the Russian Federal Space Agency

Luna-Glob (Russian: Луна-Глоб, meaning Lunar sphere) is a Moon exploration program by Roscosmos meant to progress toward the creation of a fully robotic lunar base. When completed, the program is intended to continue with crewed lunar missions, starting with a crewed orbiter spacecraft called Orel.

The program is based on plans dating back to 1997. Due to the 1998 Russian financial crisis however, the program's first mission, the Luna 25 lander, was put on hold, only to be revived a few years later. Initially scheduled for launch in 2012 on a Soyuz-2 rocket, the first mission was delayed many times; first to 2014, then to 2015 and 2016 and 2018 and 2019. Russia's Roscosmos approved a model of the Luna 25 lander in 2017.

Luna 25 was successfully launched on 11 August 2023 but crashed on the Moon's surface on 19 August due to an anomalous orbit lowering maneuver. As of February 2026, Luna 26 is planned to be launched in 2028, Luna 27 in 2029–2030, Luna 29 in 2032, Luna 28 in 2034, and Luna 30 in 2036. Initially, the Moon base would be inhabited by no more than 4 people, with their number later rising to maximum of 12 people.

== History ==
The Luna-Glob program is a continuation of the Soviet Union Luna program that sent at least 24 orbiters and landers between 1959 and 1976 to the Moon, of which fifteen were successful. The last mission was Luna 24, launched on 9 August 1976.

Initially, the first Luna-Glob mission was planned as orbiter with ground penetrating sensors. Four Japanese-built penetrators inherited from the Lunar-A were to be used, each 45 kg (100 lb), including 14 kg (31 lb) for the penetrator proper. Furthermore, seismic experiments were planned, including the use of four penetrators, which will slam into the lunar surface equipped to detect seismic signals. These experiments are expected to help clarify the origin of the Moon. Two of the penetrators are planned to land near the Apollo 11 and Apollo 12 landing sites, taking advantage of seismic data gathered there from 1969 to 1974. The payload of the orbiter will total 120 kg (260 lb) and include astrophysics experiments, dust monitors, plasma sensors, including the LORD astronomy payload, designed to study ultra-high-energy cosmic rays.

Luna-Resurs (Luna 27) was initially planned as a joint orbiter-rover mission (the orbiter was to be the Indian Chandrayaan-2) that would have featured a 58 kg Russian rover and lander, as part of the cancelled International Lunar Network. This joint mission would have landed in the Moon's south pole, examine a crater and operate for up to one year. Due to the loss of Fobos-Grunt in 2011 which was planned as a test for the landing system, Russia cited its inability to provide the lander and rover within the proposed time. India then decided to develop the lunar mission independently, achieving their moon landing with Chandrayaan-3.

== List of missions ==
Unlike their predecessors, the new Luna missions are targeted at the lunar poles. As of February 2026, the following missions are planned:

Spacecraft	Launch date	Notes	Launch vehicle	Status	Remarks
Luna 25 (Luna-Glob Lander)	10 August 2023; 23:10:57	South pole lander	Soyuz 2.1b / Fregat-M	Spacecraft failure	On 19 August 2023 at 11:57 UTC, the lander crashed on the Moon's surface after a failed orbital manoeuvre.
Luna 26 (Luna-Resurs Orbiter)	2028	Lunar orbiter	Soyuz 2.1b / Fregat-M	Planned	
Luna 27A (Luna-Resurs Lander)	2029	South pole lander	Angara A5	Planned	
Luna 27B (Luna-Resurs Lander)	2030	North pole lander	Angara A5	Planned	
Luna 29	2032	Second copy of the Luna 26 orbiter	Angara A5	Planned	
Luna 28 (Luna-Grunt)	2034	South pole lander and sample-return	Angara A5	Planned	
Luna 30	2036	Lander and rovers	Angara A5	Planned	

== Gallery ==
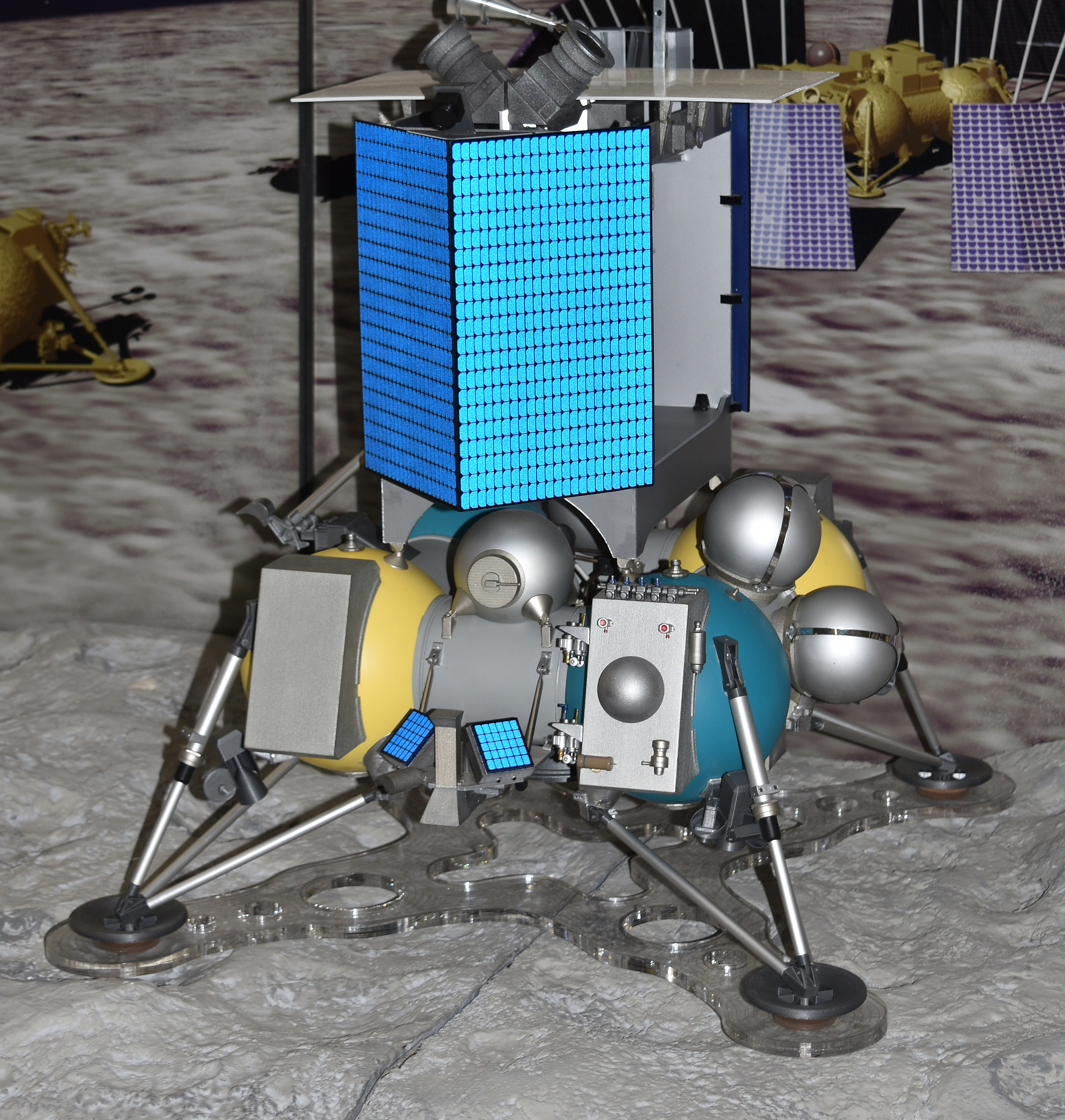
Luna 25

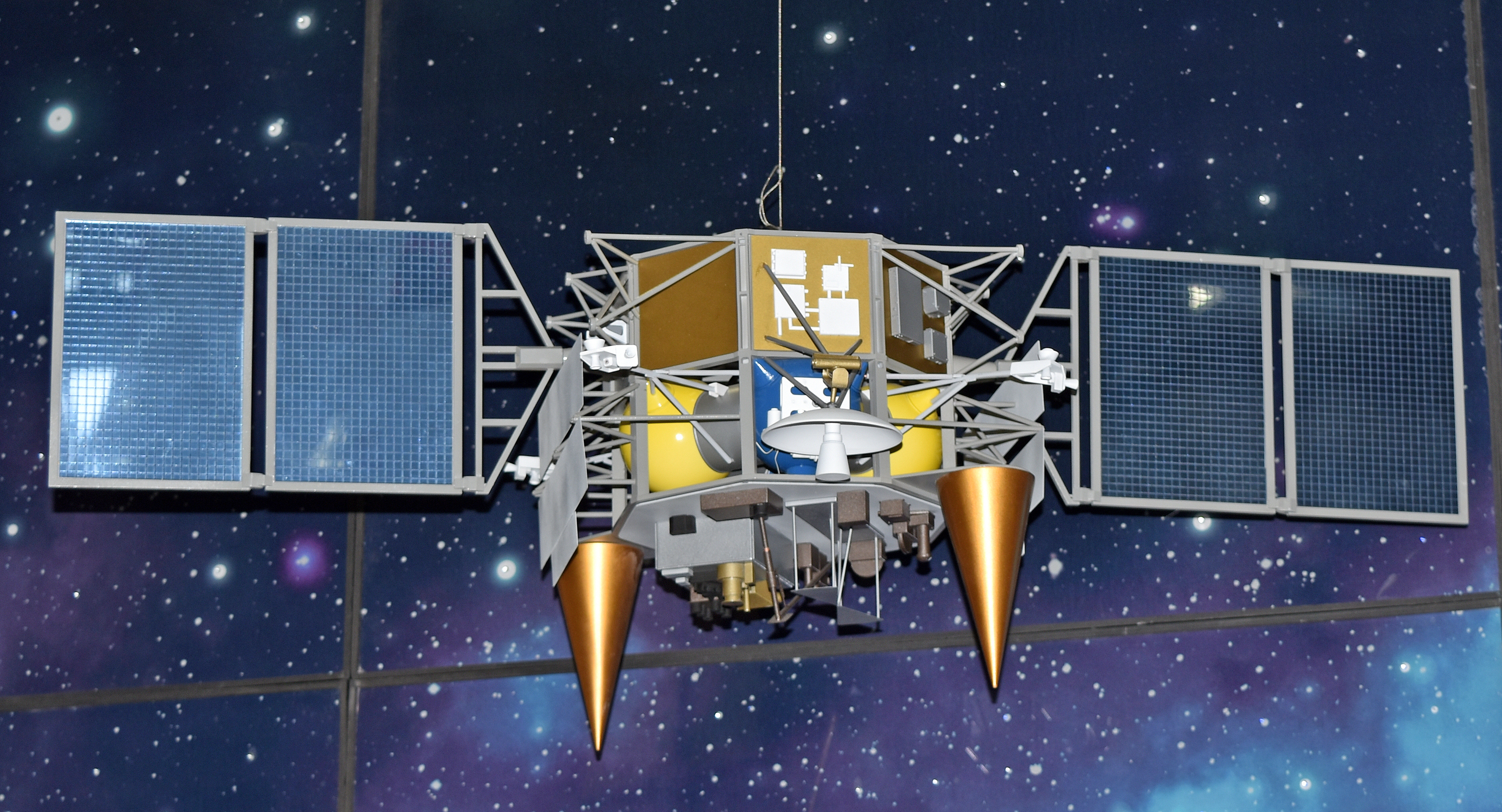
Luna 26

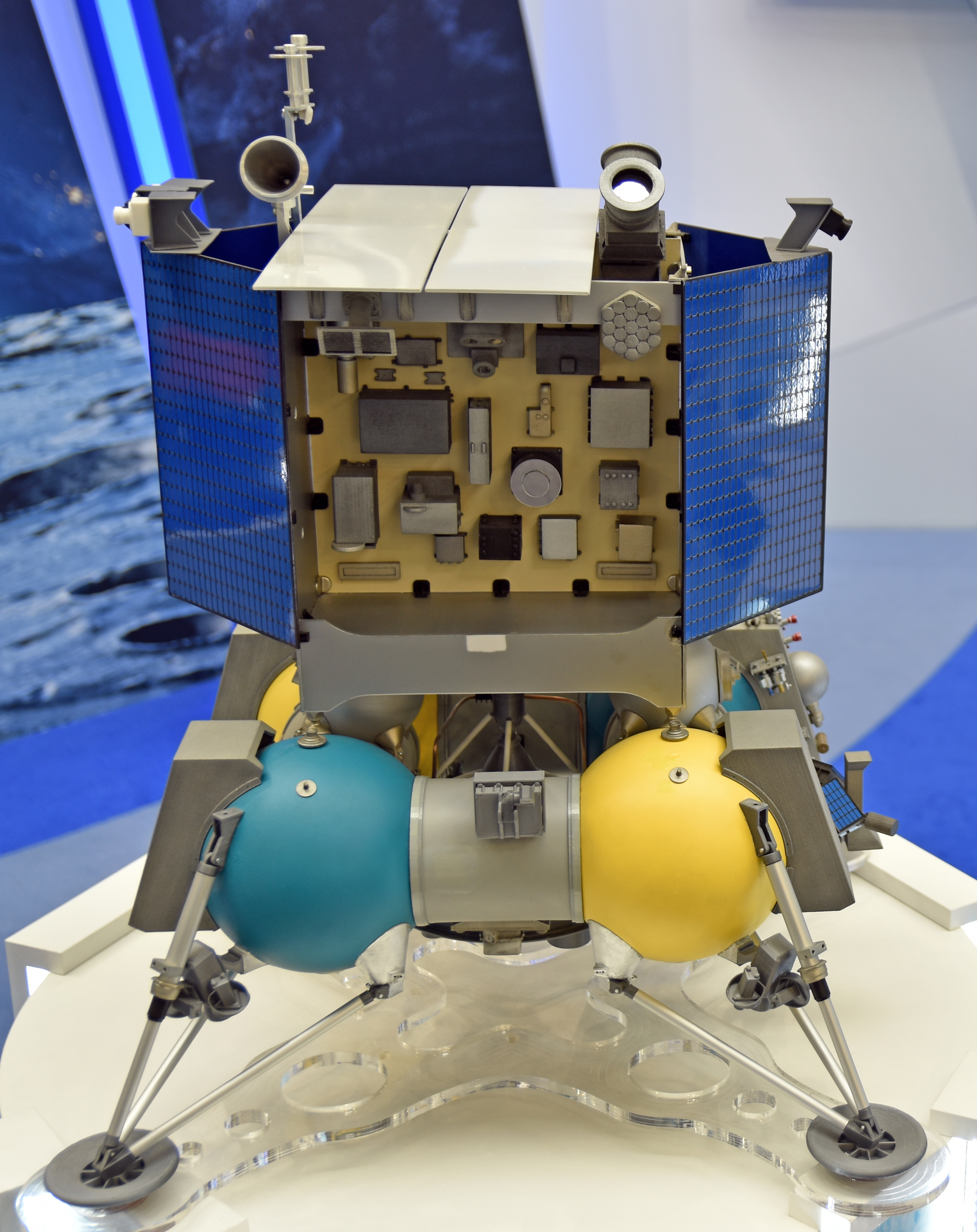
Luna 27

== Future lunar base ==
It was planned in 2008 that Luna-Glob, a "robotic proving ground", would be followed by a robotic base, known in Russian as Lunny Poligon – or Lunar Range, and this base would progress with the construction of a habitable lunar base that would have several components: solar power station, telecommunication station, technological station, scientific station, long-range research rover, landing and launch area, and a telecom orbiting satellite.

When the robotic phase is completed, the program will continue with crewed lunar missions in the 2030s, starting with a crewed orbiter mission on a spacecraft called Orel. In 2017, it was reported that Russia was planning to begin building the lunar base in the 2030s.

In December 2025, Roscosmos gave NPO Lavochkin a contract to develop a lunar nuclear power plant. Roscosmos and the China National Space Administration had signed a memorandum of cooperation for its development in May 2025.

== See also ==
- Lunar resources
- Soviet crewed lunar programs
