= Luna 27 =

Planned Russian lunar lander

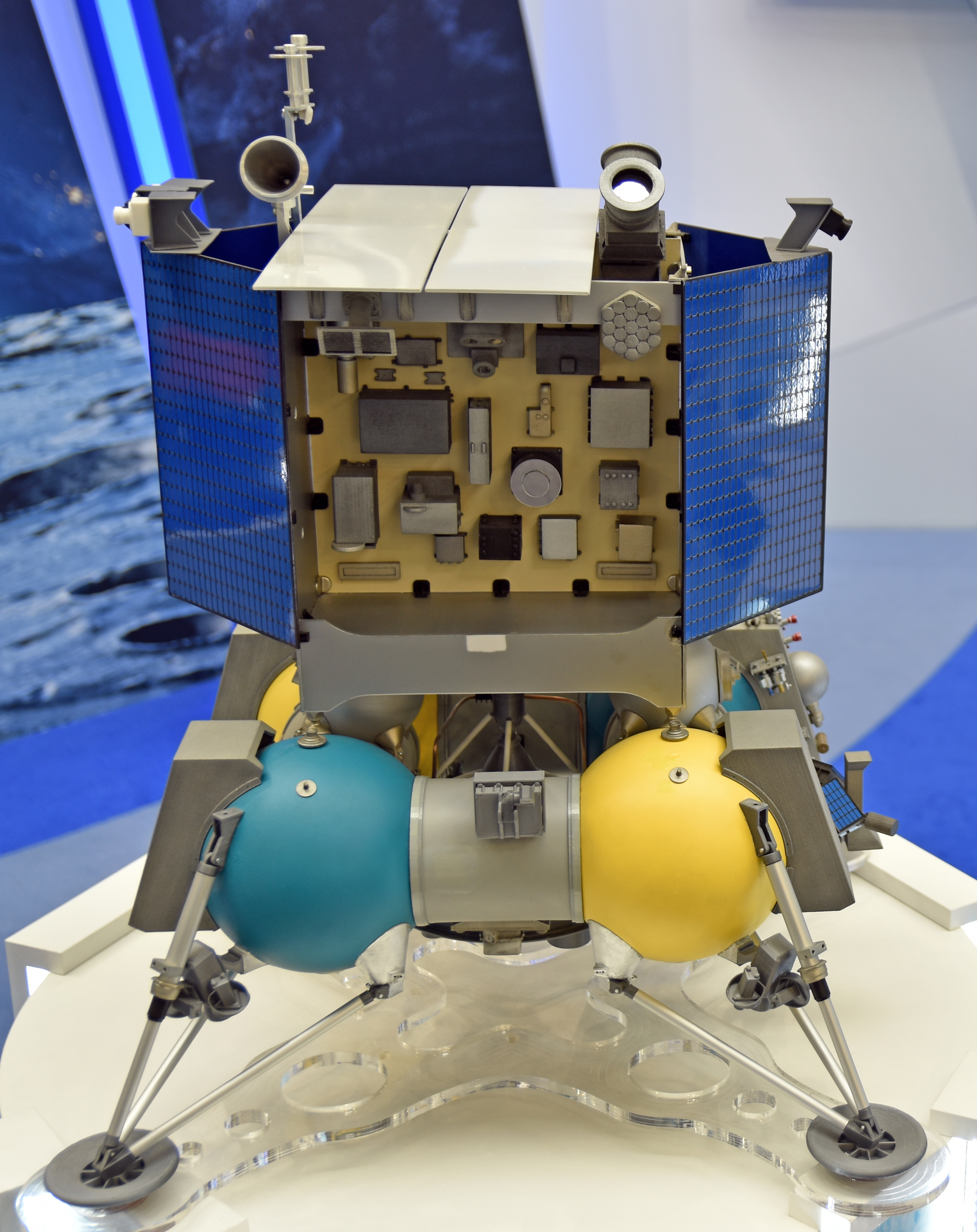
- Maquette of Luna 27 Moon lander
- Names: Luna-Resurs 1 lander Luna-Resource-1 lander
- Mission type: Technology, reconnaissance
- Operator: Roscosmos

Spacecraft properties
- Spacecraft: Lander
- Power: watts

Start of mission
- Launch date: 2029-2030 (planned)
- Rocket: Angara A5
- Launch site: Vostochny, Site 1A
- Contractor: Roscosmos

Moon lander

Luna 27 (Luna-Resurs 1 lander or Luna-Resource-1 lander) is a planned lunar lander mission by Russia’s space agency Roscosmos to send a lander to the South Pole–Aitken basin, an area on the far side of the Moon. Its objective will be to detect and characterise lunar polar volatiles. The mission is a continuation of the Luna-Glob programme.

== Mission ==
The purpose is to prospect for minerals, water–both as water ice and volatiles–and other volatiles (such as nitrogen, carbon dioxide, ammonia, hydrogen, methane and sulfur dioxide) in permanently shadowed areas of the Moon; and investigate the potential use of these natural lunar resources. Russia is investigating the establishment, in the long term, of a crewed base on the Moon's far side that would bring scientific and commercial benefits.

The lander mission was announced in November 2014 by Russia, and its launch is planned for 2029-2030.

In 2026 it was reported that two missions were planned: Luna 27A in 2029 to survey the Lunar south pole, and Luna 27B in 2030 to survey the Lunar north pole.

== Science payload ==
The lander will feature 15 science instruments that will analyse the regolith, plasma in the exosphere, dust, and seismic activity.

== Planned collaboration with ESA ==
Europe's participation in the mission received final approval at a meeting of ministers in December 2016. European Space Agency (ESA) planned to contribute with the development of a new type of automated landing system, and by providing the 'PROSPECT' package, consisting of a drill (ProSEED), sample handling, and an analysis package (ProSPA). The percussion drill is designed to go down to 2 m (6 ft 7 in) and collect cemented ice samples for an onboard miniaturised laboratory called ProSPA.

The ESA payloads under collaboration with Russia was planned to fly Package for Resource Observation and in-Situ Prospecting for Exploration, Commercial exploitation and Transportation (PROSPECT) program's ProSEED lunar sampling drill, ProSPA chemical laboratory and volatile analysis package and Exospheric Mass Spectrometer L-band (EMS-L) high-performance communications payload on this mission, but the ProSEED and ProSPA will now fly on a NASA Commercial Lunar Payload Services mission in 2025 and the EMS-L will now fly on JAXA/ISRO's LUPEX lunar rover mission in 2026 due to international collaboration being cancelled after the 2022 Russian invasion of Ukraine.

== See also ==
- In-situ resource utilization
- Lunar water
- Chang'e 6
- Soviet crewed lunar programs
