= Hongmeng project =

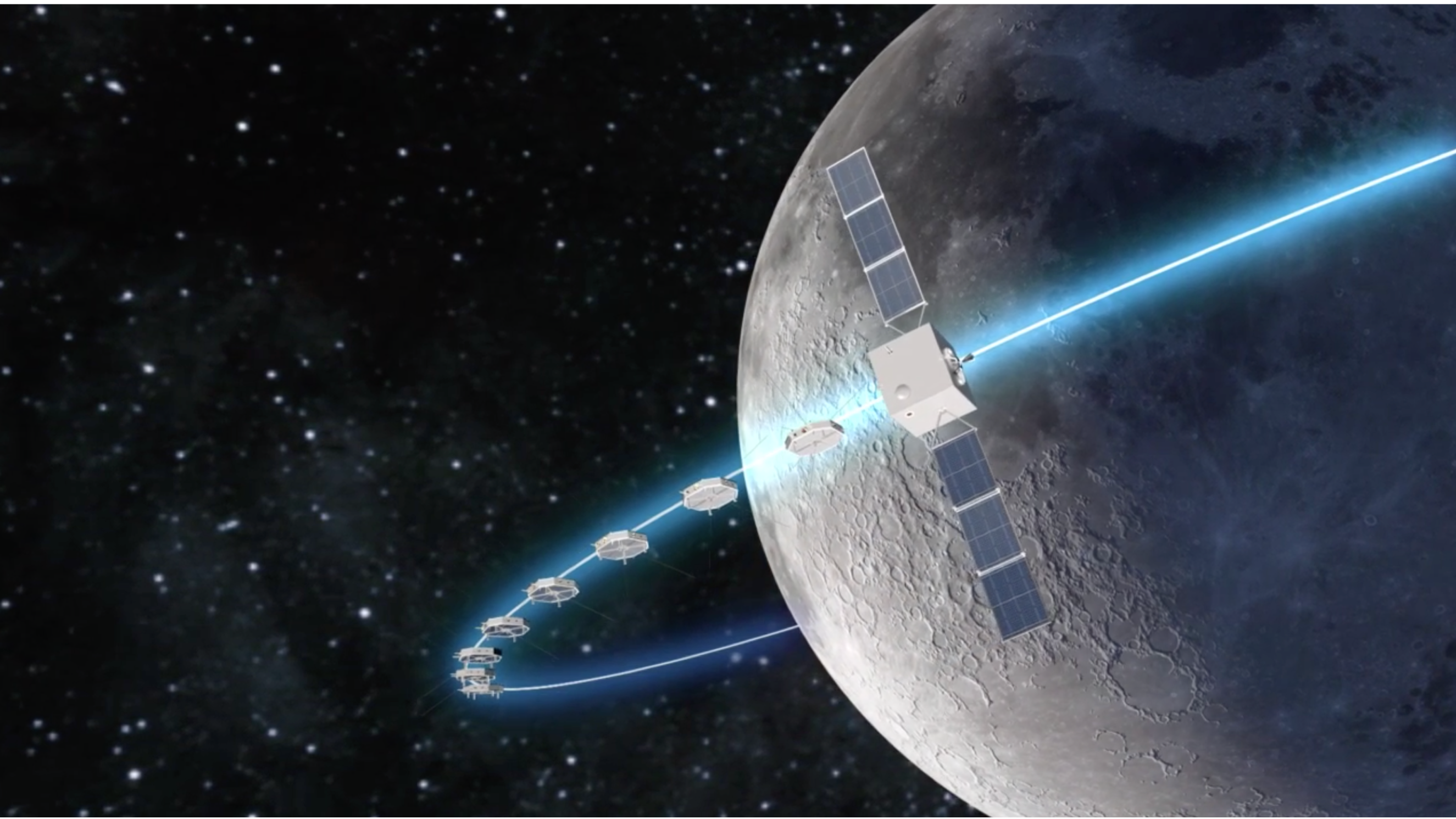
Artist Impression of Hongmeng Project

The Hongmeng project, also known as the Discovering the Sky at the Longest Wavelengths (DSL) project, is a planned Chinese space mission. The basic concept of the project is to launch an array of satellites to a lunar (selenocentric) orbit, to observe the sky at the heretofore unexplored ultralong wavelength part of the electromagnetic spectrum, and probe the early history of the Universe.

== Background ==
The sky at frequencies below 30 MHz has remained largely unknown, due to the difficulty posed by the ionosphere and radio frequency interference (RFI) for ground observations, and even at slightly higher frequencies, high precision observation is still adversely affected. The far side of the Moon provides an ideal environment to make groundbreaking new observations at this low frequency band, as the ionosphere is avoided and the RFI from the Earth can be well shielded.

A lunar orbit observatory such as Hongmeng can take advantage of this good observing condition. Compared with placing a telescope on the far side lunar surface, which requires equipment for soft landing and deploying antenna units, as well as power supply for the long lunar nights, placing the radio array in the lunar orbit is much simpler, making it an ideal project to take the first step in this field.

== Mission concept ==
The general concept of the project is to use a single rocket to launch an assembly of satellites, including a mother satellite and a number of daughter satellites. After entering the lunar orbit, the daughter satellites are released one-by-one, eventually forming a linear array of satellites flying on the same orbit, with the mother satellite at either the head or tail of the array. When this array of satellites enter into the quiet region behind the Moon, the daughter satellites will make the actual astronomical observation, and pass the data to the mother satellite by microwave. The mother satellites, which is equipped with high gain antenna and powerful on-board computer, will process the interferometry data (cross-correlation), store the output, and communication with Earth when it enters the part of orbit visible to Earth.

In its current design, the Hongmeng project has one mother satellite, 8 daughter satellites for the interferometric observation of the lower frequency band (0.1–30 MHz), and one daughter satellite for high precision measurement of global spectrum at the higher frequency band(30–120 MHz).

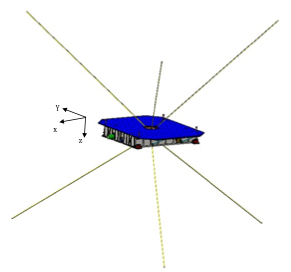
Low Frequency Daughter Satellite with antennas extended

The 8 daughter satellites have a flat shape, with deployable tripole antennas on both sides. They form an array to make interferometric imaging observation, as well as global spectrum measurement in the band 0.1 – 30 MHz, with baseline length up to 100 km.

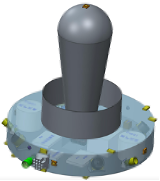
High Frequency Daughter Satellite

The high frequency satellite has an ice cream shape, which serve both as the antenna and the satellite body, and is designed to minimize chromaticity—the variation of beam with frequency. It also houses an array of sophisticated internal calibration mechanisms to achieve high precision measurement of the whole-sky-averaged radio spectrum (global spectrum)

The satellites will be moving in the same circular orbit, with a height of about 300 km and an inclination angle of 30°. The orbital motion and the precession of the orbital plane will generate a 3D distribution of baselines, allowing the whole sky to be mapped without ambiguity.

The orbit chosen for the project is a circular orbit around the Moon, with an altitude of 300 km, and an inclination angle of 30°. The mother satellite will be placed at about 10 km away from its nearest daughter. The shortest spacing between the daughter satellites is set to be greater than 100 m, while the longest spacing is 100 km. The exact relative location for the satellites is unimportant, but the location needs to be determined accurately so that it could work as an interferometer array. The satellites have mechanism to keep them within a certain range.

== Scientific objectives ==
The main science objectives of the DSL are: (1) To probe the cosmic Dark Ages (the epoch after the Big Bang but before the formation of first stars and galaxies) and cosmic dawn with high-precision measurement of the global spectrum; (2) To open up a new window of observation by mapping the sky and cataloguing the major sources at this wavelength, to reveal new astrophysical phenomena at this wavelength, and to discover the unknown unknowns; (3) Observing the Sun and planets to uncover the dynamics of the interplanetary space.

== Development history ==
During the joint call for proposal by European Space Agency and Chinese Academy of Sciences in 2014, a proposal of linear satellite array called the "Discoverying Sky at the Longest wavelength" (DSL) was advanced by a joint team of scientists from China, Netherland and Poland (see). Although this proposal was not selected at the time, further research have been conducted afterwards, first as a conceptual development project, then as a prototype project of the Chinese Academy of Science Space Science Strategic Research Project. During the Chang'e-4 mission, the Longjiang-2 micro-satellite was launched into lunar orbit, as a pilot experiment for the lunar array idea.

== Name ==
The project's Chinese name, Hong Meng (simplified Chinese: 鸿蒙; traditional Chinese: 鴻蒙), is an ancient Chinese phrase that describes a primeval chaos or the primordial Universe. Given the scientific objectives of the project, this is a very appropriate name. While sharing the same Chinese word in the name, this project is not related to the HarmonyOS system developed by Huawei.
