= Long March 9 =

Chinese super-heavy rocket in development

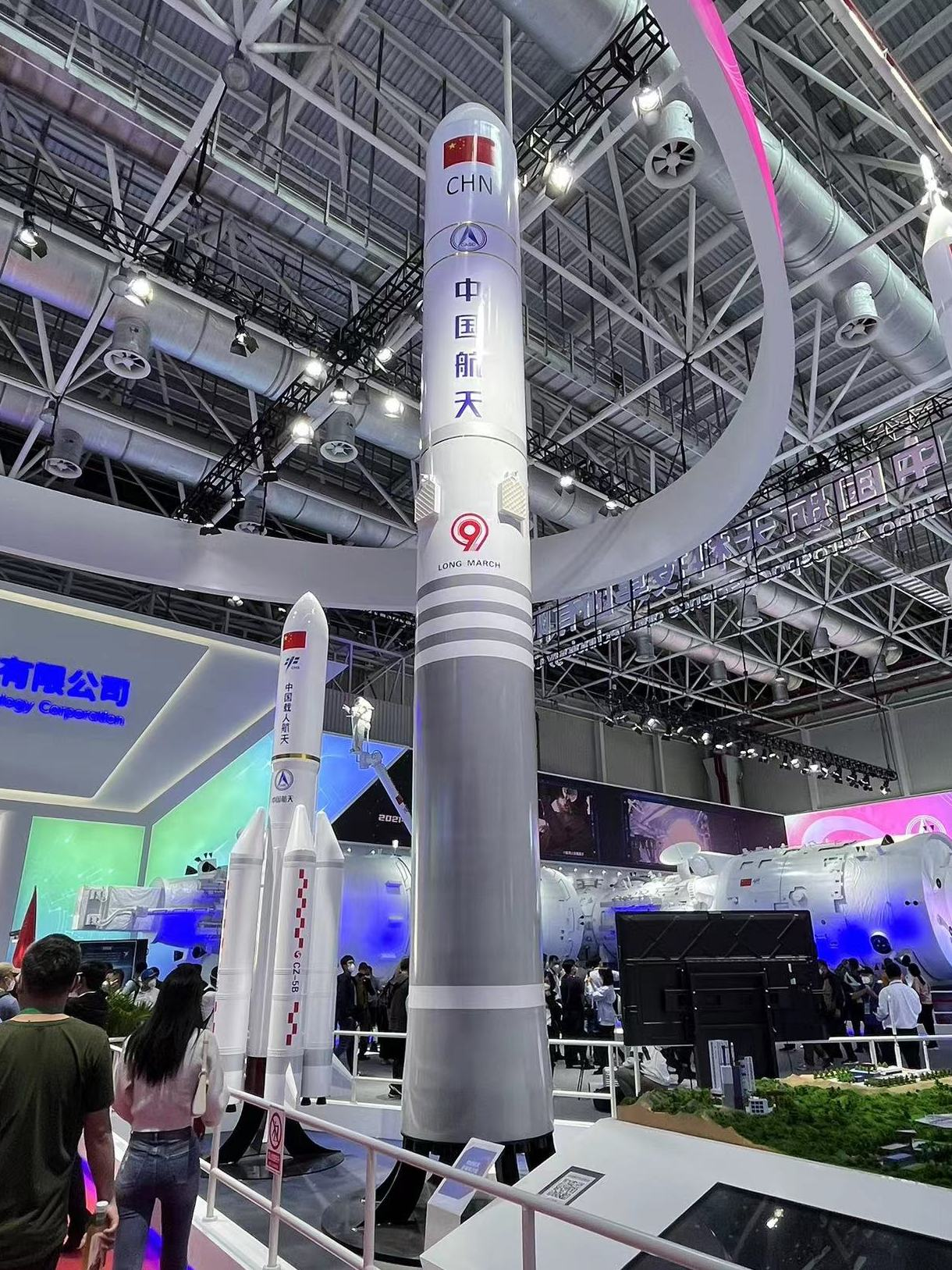
- Mock-up of the Long March 9 rocket at the 2022 Zhuhai Airshow
- Function: Super heavy-lift launch vehicle
- Manufacturer: China Academy of Launch Vehicle Technology
- Country of origin: China

Size
- Height: 114 m (374 ft)
- Diameter: 10.6 m (35 ft)
- Mass: 4,369,000 kg (9,632,000 lb)
- Stages: 3

Capacity

Payload to LEO
- Mass: 150,000 kg (330,000 lb)

Payload to TLI
- Mass: 54,000 kg (119,000 lb)

Payload to TMI
- Mass: 44,000 kg (97,000 lb)

Associated rockets
- Family: Long March
- Comparable: Energia; Saturn V; Space Launch System; Starship; Yenisei

Launch history
- Status: In development

First stage
- Diameter: 10.6 m (35 ft)
- Propellant mass: 3,420,000 kg (7,540,000 lb)
- Powered by: 30 × YF-215
- Maximum thrust: 60 MN (13,000,000 lb_{f})
- Specific impulse: 330 s (3.2 km/s)
- Propellant: LOX / CH_{4}

Second stage
- Diameter: 10.6 m (35 ft)
- Propellant mass: 370,000 kg (820,000 lb)
- Powered by: 2 × YF-215
- Maximum thrust: ~4.4 MN (990,000 lb_{f})
- Specific impulse: ~363 s (3.56 km/s)
- Propellant: LOX / CH_{4}

Third stage (Non-LEO version)
- Diameter: 10.6 m (35 ft)
- Propellant mass: 140,000 kg (310,000 lb)
- Powered by: 4 × YF-79
- Maximum thrust: 1.0 MN (220,000 lb_{f})
- Specific impulse: 455.2 s (4.464 km/s)
- Propellant: LOX / LH_{2}

Long March 9 (Chinese: 长征九号火箭, romanized: Chángzhēng jiǔ hào, LM-9 or Changzheng 9, CZ-9) is a partially reusable super-heavy lift rocket under development by the China Academy of Launch Vehicle Technology to launch from Wenchang Space Launch Site. It is the largest proposed member of the Long March rocket family.

The most recent 2023 proposal calls for a three-stage rocket with a 10.6 meter diameter. The reusable first stage would use a cluster of 30 YF-215 methalox engines, with long term plans to make the second stage reusable; these features and previous designs have drawn comparisons to SpaceX Starship. The third stage may use YF-79 or YF-91 hydrolox engines.

Current plans call for the Long March 9 to have a maximum payload capacity of 150,000 kg to low Earth orbit (LEO) and 54,000 kg to trans-lunar injection. Its first flight is planned for 2033, in anticipation of an increase in cadence by China's crewed lunar missions during the 2030s and the construction of the International Lunar Research Station with 12 other countries. The smaller under-development Long March 10 rocket is intended for initial crewed landings.

The Chinese space program has also proposed CZ-9 launches for crewed missions to Mars and space-based solar power and data centers. It was initially proposed to carry the Tianwen-3 Mars sample-return mission in a single launch; in 2022 this mission plan was revised to dual launches in 2028 using the Long March 5.

== History ==
=== 2016, early design ===
The CZ-9 was initially designed as a three-staged rocket, with a first-stage core diameter of 10 meters and using a cluster of four engines. Multiple variants of the rocket have been proposed, with CZ-9 being the largest: this 'base variant' has four additional liquid-fuel boosters strapped onto the core stage (each individual booster would be up to 5 meters in diameter) and it is this variant that has the aforementioned LEO payload capacity of 140 tons. In addition to the base variant, there is the CZ-9A variant, which has only two additional boosters and an LEO payload capacity of 100 tons. Finally, there is the CZ-9B, having only the bare 10-meter diameter core stage and an LEO payload capacity of 50 tons. The expected payload capacities of the Long March 9 place it in the class of the super heavy-lift launch vehicle. The rocket's development program was formally approved by the Chinese government in 2021.

=== 2021, new design ===
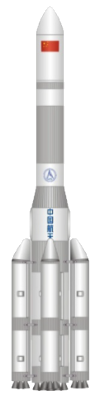
Previous Long March 9 design

On 24 June 2021, Long Lehao, chief designer of the Long March series, provided some updates regarding the Long March 9 at the University of Hong Kong in a presentation titled "Long March Rocket and China's Aerospace". The original design, called the 11th version (2011), had been supplanted by a new design, called the 21st version, which featured many changes, including an enlarged diameter of 10.6 meters, a length of 108 meters, and a weight of 4,122 tons. 16 YF-135 liquid oxygen kerosene engines, each with over 300 tons of thrust, will be used in the first stage; 120-ton hydrogen-oxygen engines will be used in the second and third stages, with four in the second stage, and one in the third stage. All fuel tanks were changed to a common bulkhead design, and all external boosters had been removed. The payload capacity to low Earth orbit was increased from 140 to 150 metric tons, and the payload to trans-lunar injection was increased to 53 tons. Long noted that this new version was still under review at the time of the presentation.

The new design was seen as being more suitable for first-stage reuse, and was a response to SpaceX's Starship, while the 2011 design for LM9 was seen as matching the NASA's Space Launch System.

=== 2022, reusable ===
On 23 April 2022, Long provided some updates on yet another new design for the Long March 9. This one, referred to as Version 22, is a reusable, booster-less design very similar to Version 21. The second and third stages will be powered by 120-tonne hydrolox engines, just like Version 21. Four engines are on the second stage and one engine is in the third stage. However, the first-stage and second-stage core diameters have been increased to 11 meters, while the third-stage diameter is 7.5 meters. The total length has been increased to 111 meters, with a mass of 4122 tonnes. The first stage will be powered by twenty-six 200-tonne methane/LOX engines instead of the YF-135 engine from the previous design. Payload capacities are 150 tonnes to LEO and 50 tonnes to TLI.

In October 2022, Long Lehao once again disclosed the new design of the Long March 9. The diameter of the first and second stages of the new version changed back to 10.6 meters, the diameter of the third stage became the same as the first and second stages, the total length increased to 114 meters, and the first stage power was changed to twenty-four of 240 tons kerosene/LOX engine. The payload capacity is 100–160 tonnes to LEO, and 35–53 tonnes to TLI.

=== 2023 ===
During a presentation at the Nanjing University of Science and Technology in March 2023, Long Lehao presented yet other modification to the plans. The reusable first stage is now powered by 30 200-tonne-thrust YF-215 engines burning methane and liquid oxygen, while the expendable second stage uses 2 engines of the same type. The third stage is optional and uses a single 120-tonne-thrust liquid hydrogen/liquid oxygen staged combustion engine named the YF-91. Long-term plans exist to make the 2nd stage reusable as well.

In April 2023 a new presentation by CALT showed the 3rd stage as powered by 4 YF-79 expander cycle liquid hydrogen/liquid oxygen engines instead, each of 25-tonnes of thrust. Another presentation on the same month shows a planned fully reusable, 2-stage version of the Long March 9 to be developed during the 2040s, in a configuration similar to the SpaceX Starship.

=== 2026 ===
In 2026 the government of Hainan published plans for the CZ-9 assembly building and wider site, which was used to infer details of the rocket, indicating a 10.6 m diameter, 110 m height, and a fairing 15 m diameter and 40 m tall. By this point, the Chinese space program had indicated other uses for the rocket in crewed missions to Mars and space-based solar power and data centers.

== See also ==
- China National Space Administration
- Shenzhou
- Chinese space program
- Comparison of orbital launchers families
- Comparison of orbital launch systems
