= Luna 28 =

Proposed lunar mission

- Names: Luna Resource 2 Luna-Grunt rover
- Mission type: Lunar sample-return mission
- Operator: Roscosmos

Spacecraft properties
- Launch mass: 4,363 kg (9,619 lb) (fueled)
- Payload mass: 400 kg (880 lb)

Start of mission
- Launch date: 2034 (planned)

End of mission
- Landing site: Lunar south pole

Luna 28 (Luna Resource 2 or Luna-Grunt rover) is a proposed sample-return mission from the south polar region of the Moon.

== Mission ==
Luna 28 will be composed of a stationary lunar lander and a lunar rover. The rover would bring soil samples back to the lander and transfer them into the ascent stage, which would launch and insert itself into a 100 km lunar orbit. While in lunar orbit, the soil-carrying capsule would be intercepted by an orbiting return module, which would perform all rendezvous operations and transfer the samples. After reloading the samples, the return vehicle separates from the orbiter and heads to Earth, while the orbital module continues its mission in the lunar orbit for at least three years. The mission was initially scheduled to be launched in 2027, but due to delays in the Luna-Glob program it was expected to be launched no earlier than 2030 by August 2023.

In February 2026, it was reported that the Luna 28 launch was scheduled for 2034.
