= Seah Holdings =

South Korean holding company

SeAH Holdings
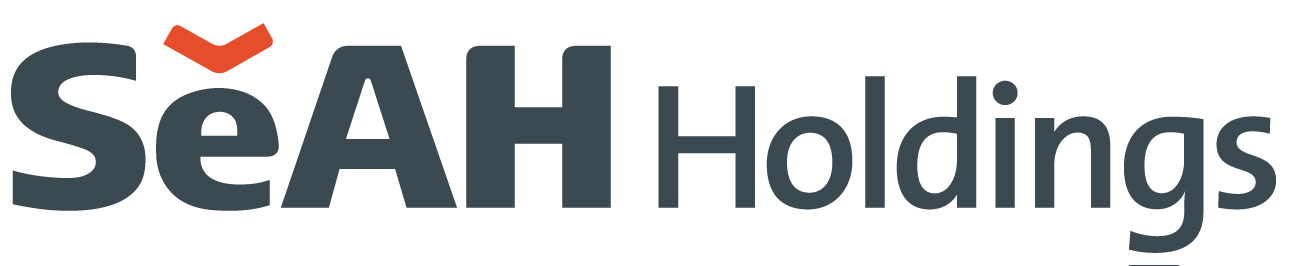
- Native name: 세아홀딩스
- Type: Public
- Traded as: KRX 058650
- Industry: Diversified Investments Conglomerate
- Headquarters: SeAH Tower, 45, Yanghwa-ro, Mapo-gu, Seoul, South Korea
- Key people: Lee Tae-sung (President and CEO)
- Revenue: 6,016,826,083,760 KRW (2024)
- Subsidiaries: SeAH Besteel Holdings; SeAH Besteel; SeAH CSS; SeAH Aerospace & Defense
- Website: SeAH Homepage

SeAH Holdings (Korean: 세아홀딩스) is a South Korean diversified holding company. Headquartered in Seoul, South Korea, it was split from SeAH Steel Corporation in 2001. Lee Tae-sung is its CEO.

The company's main business area is special steel. Its current investments include SeAH Besteel, SeAH CSS, SeAH Aerospace & Defense, among others.

== Subsidiaries and Operations ==
=== SeAH Besteel Holdings ===
SeAH Besteel Holdings was established following a corporate restructuring of SeAH Besteel. On January 20, 2022, SeAH Besteel announced its plan to separate into a holding company and a manufacturing company. The restructuring was completed on April 1, 2022, with SeAH Besteel Holdings assuming the role of the group’s holding and investment entity, while SeAH Besteel continued to operate as a steel manufacturing company.

=== SeAH Besteel ===
SeAH Besteel manufactures special steel products used in the automotive, machinery, construction, shipbuilding, and offshore wind power industries. In 2021, the company entered the nuclear energy sector by supplying used nuclear fuel transport and storage casks to the United States market, marking the first export of such products by a South Korean company.

=== SeAH CSS (Changwon Integrated Special Steel) ===
SeAH CSS specializes in the production of stainless steel and high-alloy steel products. The company operates an integrated steelmaking facility with an annual production capacity of approximately 1.2 million tons. Its product portfolio includes stainless steel bars, wire rods, and seamless pipes, which are supplied to industrial, aerospace, and defense sectors.

=== SeAH Aerospace & Defense ===
SeAH Aerospace & Defense produces high-strength aluminum alloy materials. The company manufactures aluminum extrusion and forging products for the aerospace industry and supplies materials to the supply chains of aircraft manufacturers such as Boeing, Airbus, Lockheed Martin, and Korea Aerospace Industries (KAI). It also provides materials for defense-related applications.

=== Other investments ===
- SeAH Special Steel
- SeAH M&S
- SeAH L&S
- SeAH GSI (SeAH Gulf Special Steel Industries)
- SeAH Superalloy Technologies
- SeAH Global Thailand
- Qingdao SeAH Precision Metal
- Suzhou SeAH Precision Metal
- Foshan SeAH Precision Metal
- India SeAH Precision Metal
- SeAH Precision Metal (Thailand)
- SeAH Precision Metal Indonesia
- SeAH Precision Mexico
- SeAH Automotive (Nantong)
- POS-SeAH Steel Wire (Nantong)
- POS-SeAH Steel Wire (Tianjin)
- POS-SeAH Steel Wire (Thailand)
- Irongrey
