= SeAH Aerospace & Defense =

South Korean aerospace manufacturer

- Native name: 세아항공방산소재
- Type: Private
- Industry: Aluminum materials manufacturing (high-strength aluminum extrusion and forging products)
- Founded: 1945
- Headquarters: SeAH Tower, 45, yanghwa-ro, Mapo-gu, Seoul, South Korea
- Key people: Sung Chang-mo (CEO)
- Revenue: KRW 128.7 billion (2024)
- Parent: SeAH Besteel Holdings
- Divisions: Changwon Plant; Changnyeong Plant (Scheduled for 2027)
- Website: https://www.seahaerospace.com/

SeAH Aerospace & Defense (Korean: 세아항공방산소재) is a South Korean manufacturer of aluminum alloy materials and products. The company produces aluminum extrusion and forging products used in aerospace, defense, and other industrial sectors. It was designated as a defense industry contractor by the South Korean government in 1973 and has supplied aluminum alloy products for the country's defense industry.

== History ==
- 1945: Founded as Siheung Industries
- 1973: Designated as a defense industry business
- 2020: Changed company name to SeAH Aerospace & Defense (joined SeAH Group)
- 2027 (Planned): Completion of Plant 2 in Changnyeong

== Products and Applications ==
SeAH Aerospace & Defense manufactures and supplies aluminum alloy materials and components for aerospace, defense, automotive, machinery, and electronics industries.

- Aerospace: The company supplies aluminum extrusion products used in aircraft structures, including fuselages, bulkheads, wings, and interior and exterior components. It has supplied products to manufacturers in the global aerospace industry.
- Defense: It produces aluminum alloy materials and components for defense-related applications, including launch vehicles, weapon systems, and structural materials.
- Automotive: The company manufactures aluminum products used in automotive components, such as turbocharger parts and hydrogen storage tank components for commercial vehicles.
- Machinery, Electrical and Electronics: Its products are used in industrial equipment, semiconductor manufacturing machinery, and leisure-related products.

== Production Facilities ==
=== Changwon Plant ===
The Changwon plant serves as the company's primary production facility for aluminum alloy extrusion and forging products.

=== Changnyeong Plant ===
The company is constructing a new production facility in Changnyeong, with completion scheduled for the first half of 2027. The plant is planned to include aluminum extrusion and heat-treatment facilities for the production of aerospace-grade aluminum materials used in aircraft structures, including fuselages and wings. According to the company, the facility will also incorporate a rapid-quenching heat-treatment system designed to enhance the mechanical properties of aluminum alloys.

== Industry Position ==
SeAH Aerospace & Defense has obtained supplier certifications from aerospace and defense manufacturers, including Boeing, Airbus, Lockheed Martin, and Korea Aerospace Industries. The company supplies aluminum alloy materials and products for commercial aerospace and defense applications. In addition, it entered into a long-term agreement (LTA) with Boeing for the supply of aerospace materials and components.
