= Lee Joo-sung =

South Korean businessman in the steel sector (born 1978)

- 이주성
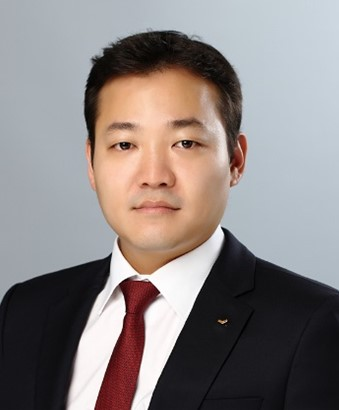
- Born: 11 August 1978 (age 48); Seoul, South Korea
- Education: MBA
- Alma mater: University of Chicago; Columbia University
- Occupations: President and CEO of SeAH Steel Holdings
- Board member of: SeAH Steel Holdings; SeAH Steel Corp.

Lee Joo-sung (Korean: 이주성; born 1978) is a South Korean businessman. He is the President and CEO of SeAH Steel Holdings, a large Korean steel conglomerate, since January 2022, and the largest shareholder of the company.

== Biography ==
Lee Joo-sung was born in 1978, in Seoul. He is son of the current SeAH Group chairman Lee Soon-hyung and grandson of the corporation's founder Lee Jong-deok. This makes him a third-generation descendant of the conglomerate, together with his cousin Lee Tae-sung. He majored in Economics and East Asian Languages & Civilizations in the University of Chicago (2001) and received an MBA from Columbia University in 2011.

He took a leading role as Senior Executive Vice President in SeAH Steel in 2018, after SeAH Steel Corp. demerged into two separate entities. In January 2022, Lee was promoted to President and CEO of SeAH Steel Holdings.

In the present, Lee is actively diversifying the company activities by investing in renewable energy in UK, Denmark and other European Countries. Lee created the UK-based subsidiary SeAh Wind and negotiated with the British government the construction of the world's biggest offshore wind power facility.
