= Samsung Aerospace =

South Korean Aerospace company

Samsung Aerospace Ind., Ltd.
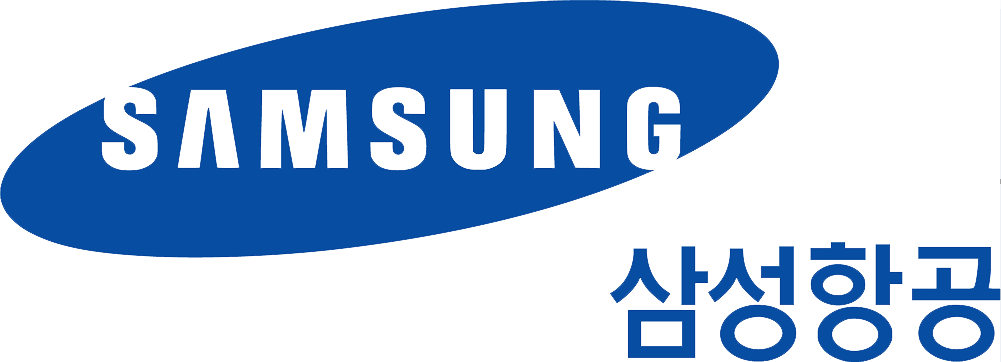
- Native name: 삼성항공산업주식회사
- Formerly: Samsung Precision (1977–1987)
- Type: Public
- Industry: Aerospace; Defense
- Founded: 1 August 1977; 48 years ago
- Defunct: March 2000
- Fate: Company name changed to Samsung Techwin after aircraft division merged with Korea Aerospace Industries
- Successors: Korea Aerospace Industries; Samsung Techwin
- Products: Aircraft engines; Fixed-wing aircraft; Helicopters
- Parent: Samsung Group

- Samsung Aerospace
- Hangul: 삼성항공
- Hanja: 三星航空
- RR: Samseong hanggong
- MR: Samsŏng hanggong

Samsung Aerospace Ind., Ltd. (SSA; Korean: 삼성항공) was a South Korean aerospace manufacturer.

== History ==
The company was originally established as Samsung Precision (Korean: 삼성정밀공업; Hanja: 三星精密工業) on 1 August 1977 with initial capital of ₩1 billion, and began constructing its first factory, a facility of 100,000 square metres (1,100,000 sq ft), in Changwon, South Gyeongsang Province. In its early history the company manufactured a variety of products including cameras and lead frames, but its business came to focus increasingly on aerospace manufacturing, and so it changed its name to Samsung Aerospace Industries in February 1987. In 1996, SSA was considering to acquire Dutch aircraft manufacturer Fokker, but the plan was scrapped because of the economic problems emerging in South Korea in the late 90s. The company changed its name to Samsung Techwin in March 2000, after its aircraft division was merged into Korea Aerospace Industries (KAI) along with Daewoo Heavy Industries and Hyundai Space and Aircraft in 1999.

== Business activity ==
Its business activity comprised the production and repair of jet engines, including assembly of the GE J85, CFM56, LM2500 and F404 engines as well as, in cooperation with Pratt & Whitney, the production of the PW 4000. SSA also sold turbine blades for the GE CF6-80C to General Electric, produced stringers for Boeing as well as other components such as wing ribs for various aircraft. They had a joint venture with Sermatech International for services related to the treatment of surfaces for turbine engine components. In 1996 SSA reached an agreement with Bell Helicopter to co-develop the Bell 427. They also cooperated with Central Aerohydrodynamic Institute in the development of composite materials for aircraft. In the early 1990s, SSA provided major assemblies and mate through delivery of F-16 Falcons for the Republic of Korea Air Force from its plant in Sacheon under license to Lockheed Martin. South Korea and the US jointly developed the KAI T-50 Golden Eagle via a joint venture between SSA and Lockheed Martin, originally conceived as the KTX-2.
