= KAI RQ-101 Songgolmae =

South Korean unmanned aerial vehicle

RQ-101 Songgolmae
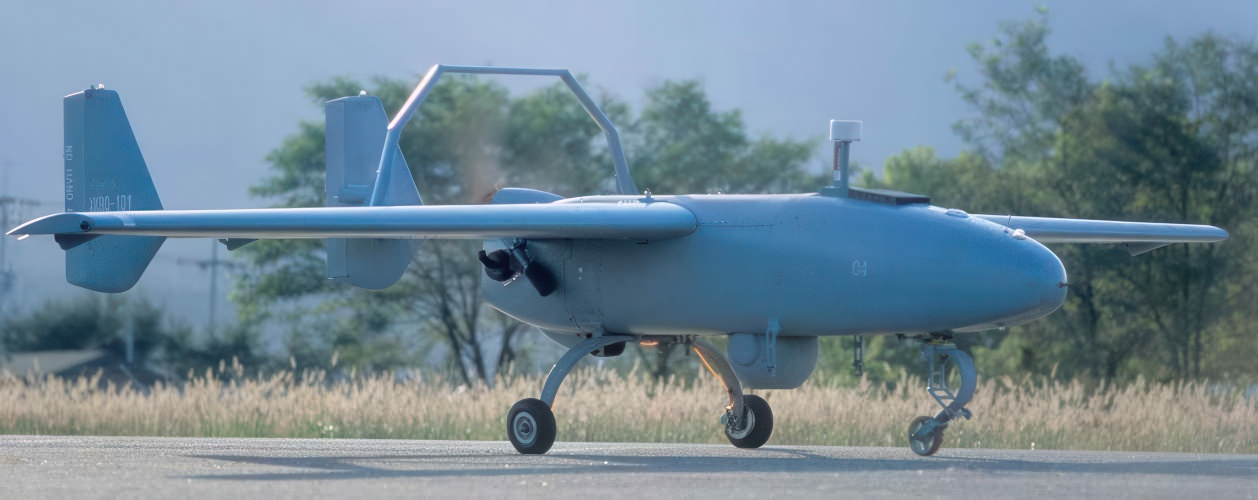

General information
- Type: Unmanned surveillance and reconnaissance aerial vehicle
- National origin: South Korea
- Manufacturer: Korea Aerospace Industries
- Designer: Agency for Defense Development; Korea Aerospace Industries
- Status: In service
- Primary user: Republic of Korea Army

History
- Manufactured: 2000–present
- Introduction date: 2002
- First flight: 1993

The KAI RQ-101 Songgolmae (Korean: RQ-101 송골매; Hanja: RQ-101 松鶻매) is a South Korean military unmanned aerial vehicle (UAV) developed by the Agency for Defense Development (ADD) and the Korea Aerospace Industries (KAI) in 2000. RQ-101 is an unarmed UAV designed for corps commanders and has been deployed and serviced by the South Korean Army since 2002 to collect military intelligence. It was officially given the name Songgolmae (송골매, "peregrine falcon").

== Development and Design ==
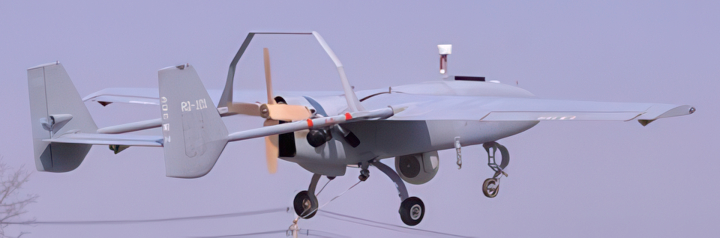
RQ-101 Songgolmae during takeoff

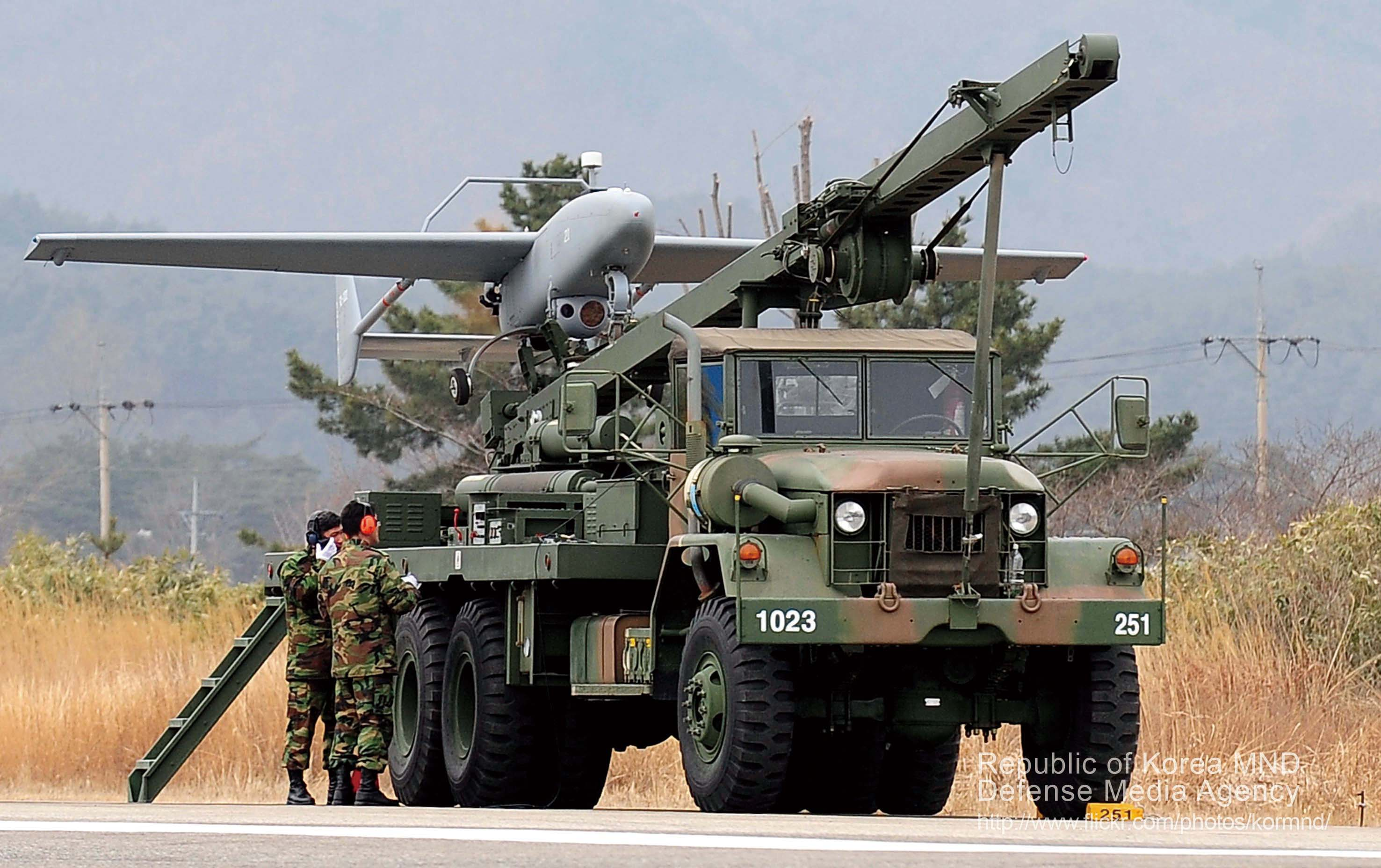
RQ-101 on a K711 cargo truck

The South Korean Army was using Searcher UAVs, which were introduced from Israel. In 1991, South Korea began developing its own UAVs for use in ground surveillance and reconnaissance operations by Corps-level units of the South Korean Army. Exploratory development of South Korean military UAVs was carried out from 1991 to 1992, and system development began in 1993, and operational tests were conducted to verify performance until 1997, and the development was officially completed in 2000. Officially, it is not known how many RQ-101s are in service with the South Korean Army. According to public sources, there were several dozen in 2017.

The RQ-101 has a wingspan of 6.4 meters (21 ft) and a total length of 4.7 meters (15 ft) and is made of high-strength, light carbon fiber and glass fiber composites. The 52-horsepower (39 kW) engine accelerates the propeller-driven device to a maximum speed of 185 km (115 mi) and a cruising speed of 150 km (93 mi). The maximum altitude is about 4,500 meter (14,800 ft). The aircraft can stay in the air for about six hours and cover a radius of 110 km (68 mi) to 200 km (120 mi). The gross weight is 215 kg (474 lb), the maximum take-off weight is 290 kg (640 lb), and it has a payload weight of 50 kg (110 lb) for military operations.

The aircraft is equipped with electro-optics (EO), forward-looking infrared (FLIR), GPS/INS navigation, and line of sight (LOS) data link for surveillance and reconnaissance and real-time target acquisition. By default, the aircraft has an HD video camera that can send live images.

== Improvements ==
The performance improvement program was carried out from 2009 to 2011, and the hardware of the mission equipment and ground control equipment was upgraded, and three minor improvements were made until 2015. However, the RQ-101 is no longer undergoing performance improvement due to lack of additional development budget, and the Korea Aerospace Industries is currently developing a next-generation UAV named the NCUAV to replace the RQ-101 since 2012.

== Operators ==
South Korea

- Republic of Korea Army

== Specifications ==
Data from Korea Aerospace Industries

General characteristics

- Crew: Unmanned
- Length: 4.7 m (15 ft 5 in)
- Wingspan: 6.4 m (21 ft 0 in)
- Height: 1.5 m (4 ft 11 in)
- Gross weight: 215 kg (474 lb)
- Max takeoff weight: 290 kg (639 lb)
- Payload: 50 kg (110 lb)
- Powerplant: 1 × propeller engine 52 shp (39 kW)

Performance

- Maximum speed: 185 km/h (115 mph, 100 kn)
- Cruise speed: 150 km/h (93 mph, 81 kn)
- Range: 200 km (120 mi, 110 nmi)
- Endurance: 6 hours
- Service ceiling: 4,500 m (14,800 ft)

Avionics

- SU-1K Electro-optics (EO) system
- Forward-looking infrared (FLIR) camera
- GPS/INS combined navigation system
- Line of sight (LOS) data link
