= Bell 427 =

Utility helicopter

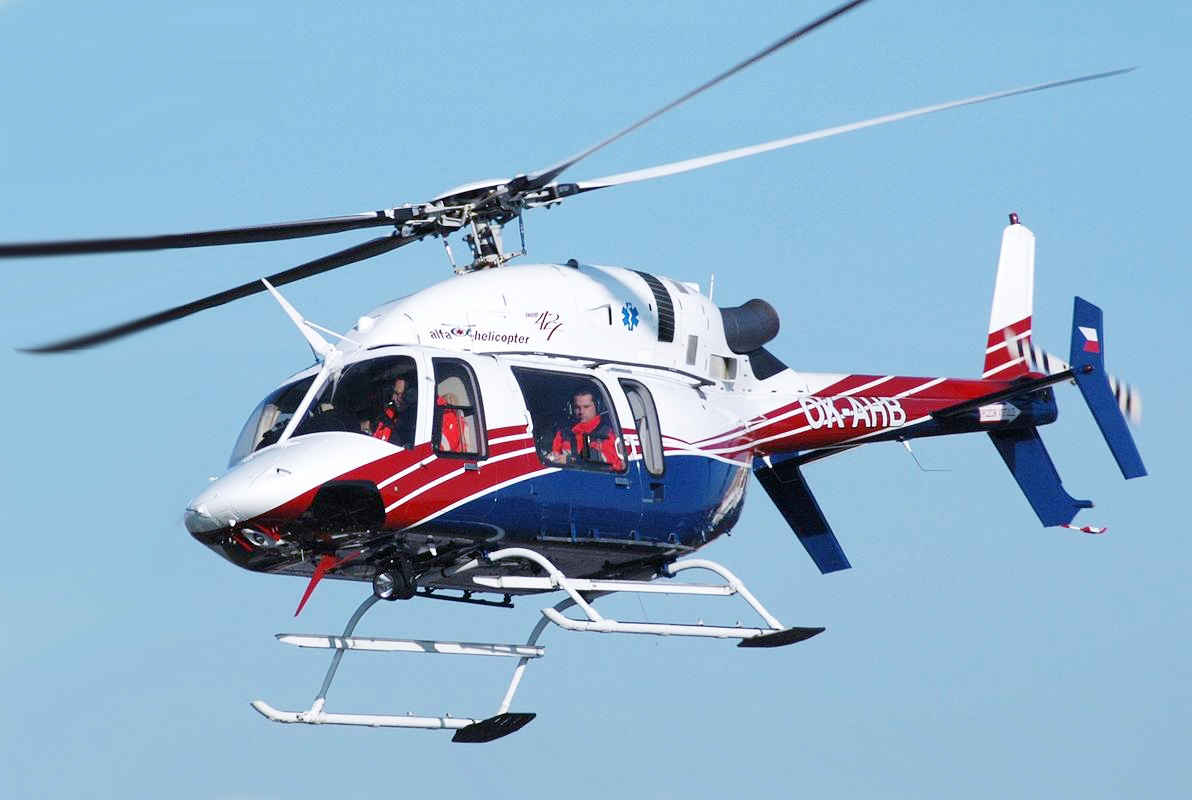
- A Bell 427 in flight

General information
- Type: Multipurpose utility helicopter
- National origin: United States/Canada/South Korea
- Manufacturer: Bell Helicopter; Samsung Aerospace Industries (later part of Korea Aerospace Industries)
- Status: In service

History
- Manufactured: 1997–2010
- Introduction date: 2000
- First flight: 11 December 1997
- Developed from: Bell 407
- Developed into: Bell 429 GlobalRanger

The Bell 427 is a twin-engine, multirole, light utility helicopter designed and manufactured by Bell Helicopter and Samsung Aerospace Industries (now Korea Aerospace Industries). It has been replaced in production by the larger Bell 429.

== Development ==
Bell has tried several incarnations of a twin version of its successful Bell 206 series, including the Bell 400 and 440 in the mid-1980s, and the limited-production Bell 206LT TwinRanger in the early 1990s. Bell's original concept for a replacement for the 206LT TwinRanger was the Bell 407T, a relatively straightforward twin-engine development of the Bell 407 with two Allison 250-C22B engines. However, Bell concluded that the payload-range performance of the 407T would not be sufficient.

The company began development of a new light twin, in partnership with South Korea's Samsung Aerospace Industries. In February 1996, Bell announced its Model 427 at the Heli Expo in Dallas. The Bell 427 was the company's first aircraft designed entirely on computer. The Bell 427 first flew on December 11, 1997. Canadian certification was awarded on November 19, 1999, followed by US certification in January 2000, and US FAA dual pilot IFR certification in May 2000. Bell builds the 427's flight dynamics systems at Fort Worth, Texas, while final assembly is performed at Bell's Mirabel, Quebec facility. The 427's fuselage and tailboom are built by Samsung (later part of KAI) at its Sachon plant in South Korea. The first customer deliveries occurred in January 2000.

In 2004, Bell offered a redesigned 427 version, the Bell 427i, which was developed in partnership with South Korea's Korea Aerospace Industries and Japan's Mitsui Bussan Aerospace. The agreement gave KAI the development and production responsibility for the fuselage, cabin wiring, and fuel system. Mitsui Bussan became a financial backer. The 427i included a newer glass cockpit and navigation systems to allow single pilot flying under Instrument flight rules. The design had a fuselage lengthened 1 ft 2 in (0.36 m), a more powerful engine version and transmission, and increased takeoff weight. However, the program was canceled and focus shifted to the improved Bell 429. In February 2005, the existing 80 orders for the 427i were converted to the 429. On January 24, 2008, Bell announced plans to officially discontinue its 427 line after current order commitments were fulfilled in 2010.

== Design ==
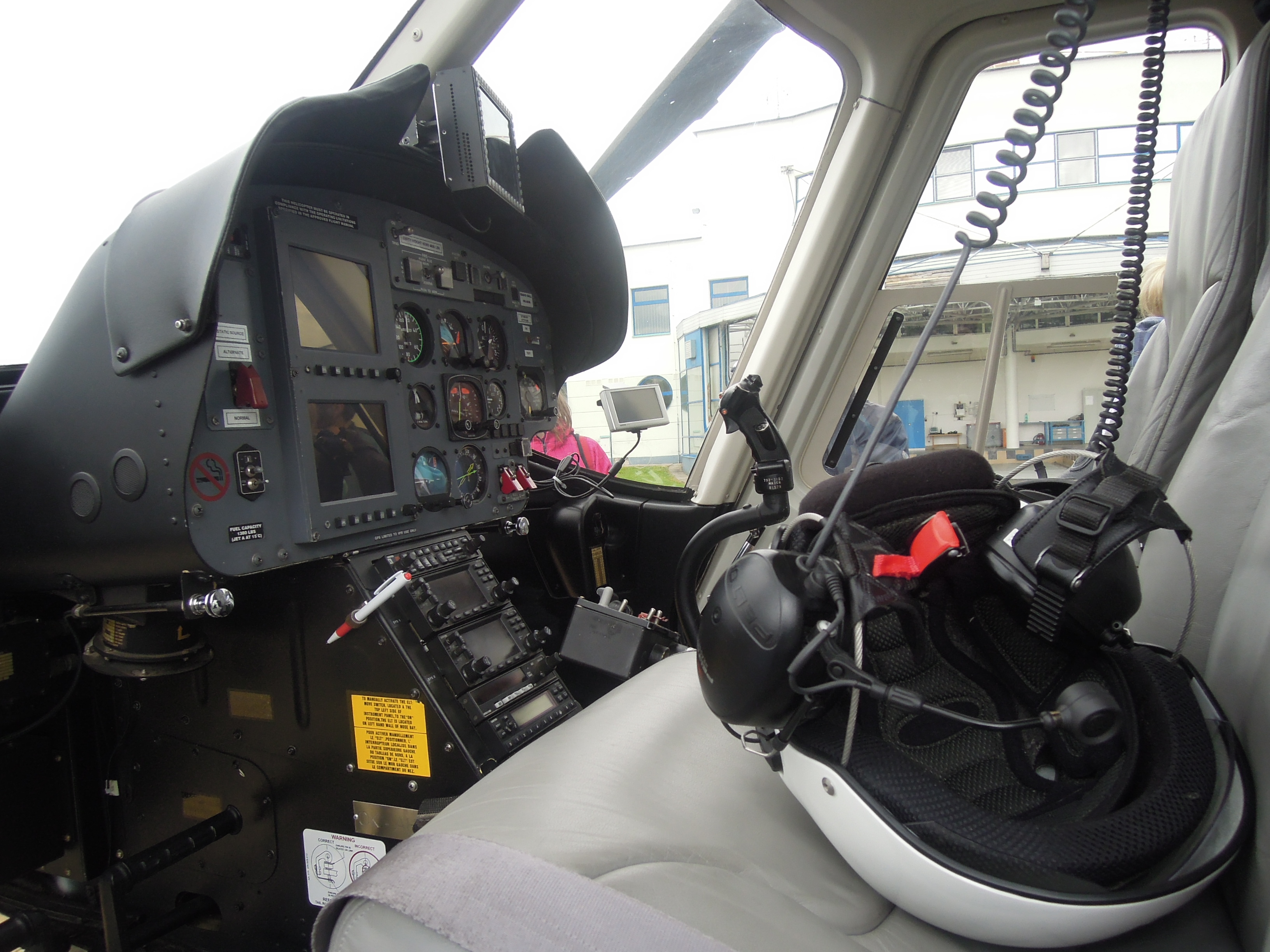
Bell 427 cockpit

The Bell 427 is powered by two Pratt & Whitney Canada PW207D turboshaft engines with FADEC. Like the Bell 407, the 427 uses a four-blade main rotor system with a rigid, composite rotor hub and a two-blade tail rotor.

The Bell 427's cabin is 13 in (33 cm) longer than the 407, and consists primarily of composite construction. The design removes the roof beam which obstructs the cabin on the 206/206L/407, and has an optional sliding main cabin door.

The 427 offers eight-place seating including pilot in a two+three+three arrangement. Alternate layouts include four in the main cabin in a club configuration, or two stretchers and two medical attendants for medical evacuation duties.

== Operators ==
- Argentina
  - Entre Rios Police
- Czech Republic
  - Czech HEMS – Alfa Helicopter
- Paraguay
  - Paraguayan Air Force

== Specifications (Bell 427) ==
Data from Bell Helicopter, International Directory of Civil Aircraft, Aerospace-Technology

General characteristics

- Crew: 2
- Capacity: 7 passengers / 2,960 lb (1,343 kg) internal load
- Length: 37 ft 6 in (11.43 m)
- Height: 10 ft 6 in (3.20 m) with standard skids
- Empty weight: 3,881 lb (1,760 kg)
- Max takeoff weight: 6,550 lb (2,971 kg)
- Powerplant: 2 × Pratt & Whitney Canada PW207D turboshaft engines, 710 shp (530 kW) each
- Main rotor diameter: 37 ft 0 in (11.28 m)
- Main rotor area: 1,075 sq ft (99.9 m^{2})
- Blade section: - root: Boeing VR-7; tip: Narramore 8%

Performance

- Maximum speed: 140 kn (160 mph, 260 km/h)
- Cruise speed: 138 kn (159 mph, 256 km/h)
- Range: 394 nmi (453 mi, 730 km)
- Service ceiling: 10,000 ft (3,000 m)
- Rate of climb: 2,000 ft/min (10 m/s)

== See also ==
Related development

- Bell 206
- Bell 400 TwinRanger
- Bell 407
- Bell 429 GlobalRanger

Aircraft of comparable role, configuration, and era

- AgustaWestland AW109
- Eurocopter EC 145
- MBB/Kawasaki BK 117
- MD Helicopters MD Explorer
