= SeAh Wind =

British steel company

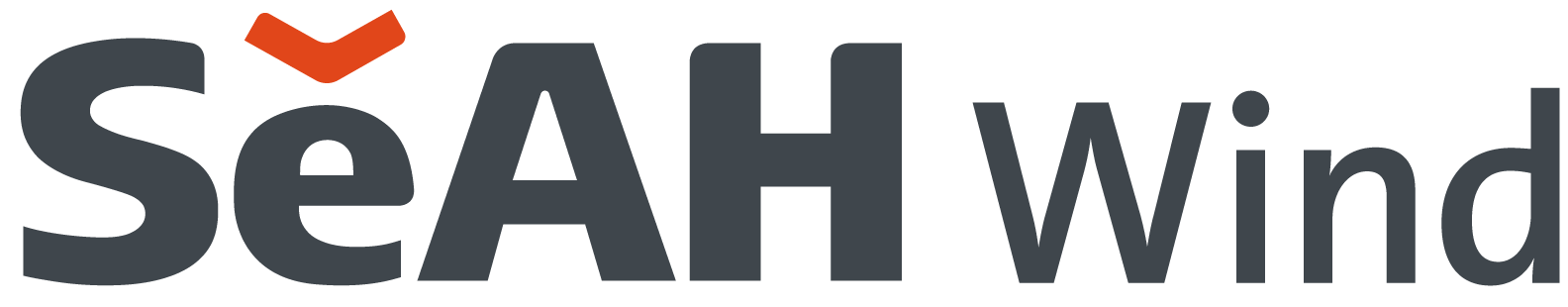
- Industry: Steel Pipe
- Founded: February 2021
- Headquarters: Stephenson House, High Force Road, Riverside Park, Middlesbrough, United Kingdom TS2 1RH, United Kingdom
- Key people: Lee Joo-sung (President); Sohn Sunghwal (CEO)
- Products: Monopiles
- Parent: SeAh Steel Holdings
- Website: https://www.seahwind.com/

SeAh Wind (Korean: 세아윈드) is a British company located in Middlesbrough. It is a subsidiary of SeAh Steel Holdings, a South Korean steel company, and manufactures monopiles, which are substructures for offshore wind power generation. It was registered as a corporation in the UK in February 2021.

== History ==
The parent company, SeAh Steel Holdings Co., Ltd., signed a Memorandum of Understanding with the UK government in August 2020 for the construction of a monopile production facility. As a result, SeAh Wind was established as a UK corporation in February 2021 to participate as a monopile manufacturer in the offshore wind power value chain led by the UK government.

SeAh Wind is building the world's largest monopile manufacturing plant in Teesside, UK, with commercial production scheduled to begin in March 2025. The plant's maximum production capacity is estimated at 400,000 tons of monopiles per year, and its operation has attracted significant attention in the UK, including a visit from Charles III.

Key contracts include a £364 million monopile supply agreement with Ørsted, Denmark’s state-owned energy company. This agreement was signed in 2021 during SeAh Wind’s early stages. Additionally, in late 2023, SeAh Wind secured a £900 million supply contract with Vattenfall, a Swedish energy company.
