= Bell 400 TwinRanger =

Utility helicopter prototype

Bell 400 TwinRanger Bell 440
- A Bell 400 prototype

General information
- Type: Multipurpose utility helicopter
- National origin: United States
- Manufacturer: Bell Helicopter
- Status: Canceled
- Number built: 7

History
- First flight: 4 April 1984
- Developed from: Bell 206L LongRanger

The Bell 400 TwinRanger was a prototype four-bladed, twin-engine civil helicopter developed by Bell Helicopter in the 1980s. Both the TwinRanger and another planned version, the Bell 440, were attempts to market a twin-engine development of the 206L LongRanger. The Bell 400A was a planned single-engine version of the 400 TwinRanger, however development was canceled when Bell could not acquire enough orders for production. The TwinRanger name was later used for a twin-engine version of the LongRanger produced from 1994 to 1997.

== Development ==
Bell has tried several incarnations of a twin-engine version of its successful Bell 206 series. The TwinRanger name dates back to the mid-1980s when Bell first considered developing a twin-engine version of the LongRanger.

The Bell 400 TwinRanger featured a reprofiled fuselage, two Allison 250 turboshafts, the OH-58D Kiowa's four-bladed main rotor, and a new shrouded tail rotor. Bell also planned the single-engine 400A, and the 440 twin with a larger fuselage made possible by a high degree of composites. The Bell 400 first flew on April 4, 1984. Bell suspended development of the 400/440 family in the late 1980s as it felt unable to achieve a profitable production rate of 120 units a year.

=== Successors ===
After the success of Tridair's Gemini ST twin-engine conversions of the 206L in the early 1990s, Bell produced the equivalent Bell 206LT TwinRanger based on the 206L-4. Only 13 206LTs were built between 1994 and 1997. The 206LT was replaced in Bell's lineup by the Bell 427, a mostly-new development of the Bell 407, itself a four-bladed single-engine derivative of the 206L.

== Variants ==
Bell 400
Bell 400A
Projected model to be powered by one PW209T turboshaft of 937 shp (699 kW).
Bell 440

== Specifications (Bell 400) ==
Data from The Illustrated Encyclopedia of Helicopters

General characteristics

- Crew: 1
- Capacity: 5 passengers
- Empty weight: 3,075 lb (1,395 kg)
- Max takeoff weight: 5,500 lb (2,495 kg)
- Powerplant: 2 × Allison 250-C20P turboshaft, 420 shp (310 kW) each
- Main rotor diameter: 35 ft 0 in (10.67 m)
- Main rotor area: 962 sq ft (89.4 m^{2})

Performance

- Maximum speed: 172 mph (277 km/h, 149 kn)
- Cruise speed: 161 mph (259 km/h, 140 kn)
- Range: 450 mi (730 km, 390 nmi)
- Service ceiling: 10,000 ft (3,000 m)
- Rate of climb: 2,000 ft/min (10 m/s)

== See also ==
Related development

- Bell 206L/LT
- Bell 407
- Bell 427
