= SeAH Superalloy Technologies =

American manufacturing company

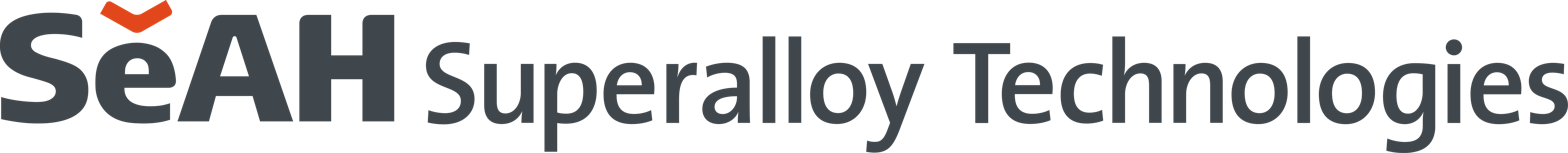
- Native name: 세아 슈퍼알로이 테크놀로지스
- Type: Privately held company
- Industry: Special alloy manufacturing (superalloys, aerospace & defense materials)
- Founded: 2024
- Headquarters: Temple, Texas, United States
- Key people: Lee Tae-sung (President & CEO); Nick Huston (CEO)
- Parent: SeAH Besteel Holdings
- Website: www.seahsuperalloys.com

SeAH Superalloy Technologies (Korean: 세아 슈퍼알로이 테크놀로지스) is a U.S.-based special alloy manufacturing subsidiary of SeAH Besteel Holdings, an intermediate holding company within South Korea's SeAH Group. The company was established to manufacture superalloys and advanced metal materials for use in the aerospace, defense, space, and energy industries in North America.

SeAH Superalloy Technologies is constructing a manufacturing facility in Temple, Texas. The facility has been described as a key overseas production base for SeAH Group's advanced materials business.

== History ==
SeAH Besteel Holdings announced the establishment of a U.S.-based special alloy manufacturing subsidiary on May 16, 2024. On July 9, 2024, the company signed an investment agreement with the City of Temple, Texas, detailing plans for the construction of a new manufacturing facility. The production plant in Temple is scheduled to be completed in 2026.

== Operations ==
SeAH Superalloy Technologies specializes in the production of nickel-based superalloys and other advanced metal materials engineered for high-temperature and high-stress environments. The company's products are intended for use in aircraft engines, aerospace components, defense systems, and energy-related applications. According to media reports, the company seeks to strengthen its role within the North American aerospace and defense materials supply chain through localized manufacturing.

== Investment and facilities ==
The company's manufacturing facility in Temple, Texas, represents an investment estimated at between US$110 million and US$155 million. Once fully operational, the plant is expected to have an annual production capacity of approximately 6,000 metric tons of special alloy products.

== Parent company ==
SeAH Superalloy Technologies is a wholly owned subsidiary of SeAH Besteel Holdings and operates as part of SeAH Group's broader strategy to expand its advanced materials manufacturing capabilities globally.
