= SeAH Besteel Holdings =

South Korean holding company

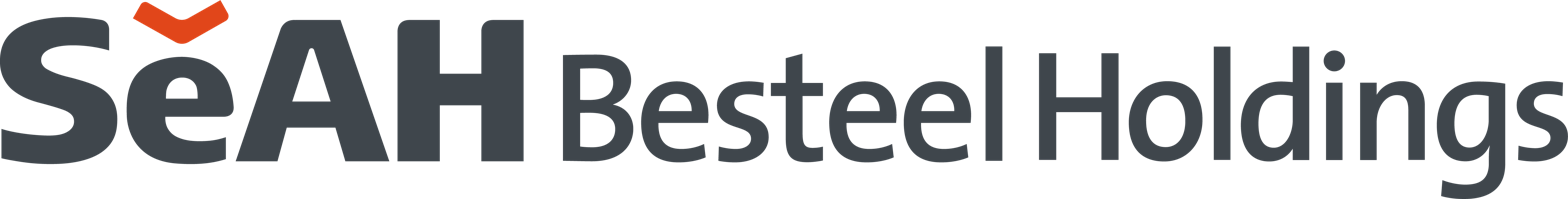
- Native name: 세아베스틸지주
- Type: Public
- Traded as: KRX: 001430
- Industry: Holding company (Special steel and advanced metal materials)
- Founded: 1 April 2022; 4 years ago
- Headquarters: SeAH Tower, 45, yanghwa-ro, Mapo-gu, Seoul, South Korea
- Key people: Lee Tae-sung (President & CEO); Kim Su-ho (Vice President & CEO)
- Parent: SeAH Holdings
- Subsidiaries: SeAH Besteel; SeAH CSS; SeAH Aerospace & Defense; SeAH GSI; SeAH Superalloy Technologies
- Website: https://www.seahbesteelholdings.co.kr/

SeAH Besteel Holdings (Korean: 세아베스틸지주) is a South Korean intermediate holding company within the SeAH Group. The company was established on April 1, 2022, following the corporate split of SeAH Besteel into a holding company and a manufacturing company. It oversees domestic and international subsidiaries involved in the production of special steel, stainless steel, aluminum, and other metal materials, supplying products to sectors including aerospace, defense, nuclear energy, and specialty materials.

== History ==
SeAH Besteel Holdings was established following a corporate restructuring of SeAH Besteel. On January 20, 2022, SeAH Besteel announced its plan to separate into a holding company and a manufacturing company. The restructuring was completed on April 1, 2022, with SeAH Besteel Holdings assuming the role of the group’s holding and investment entity, while SeAH Besteel continued to operate as a steel manufacturing company.

On August 8, 2022, SeAH CSS (Changwon Integrated Special Steel) formed a joint venture with Saudi Aramco to establish SeAH GSI (Gulf Special Steel Industries). In May 2024, SeAH Besteel Holdings announced the establishment of a U.S.-based special alloy manufacturing subsidiary, SeAH Superalloy Technologies.

== Subsidiaries and Operations ==
=== SeAH Besteel ===
SeAH Besteel manufactures special steel products used in the automotive, machinery, construction, shipbuilding, and offshore wind power industries. In 2021, the company entered the nuclear energy sector by supplying used nuclear fuel transport and storage casks to the United States market, marking the first export of such products by a South Korean company.

=== SeAH CSS (Changwon Integrated Special Steel) ===
SeAH CSS specializes in the production of stainless steel and high-alloy steel products. The company operates an integrated steelmaking facility with an annual production capacity of approximately 1.2 million tons. Its product portfolio includes stainless steel bars, wire rods, and seamless pipes, which are supplied to industrial, aerospace, and defense sectors.

=== SeAH Aerospace & Defense ===
SeAH Aerospace & Defense produces high-strength aluminum alloy materials. The company manufactures aluminum extrusion and forging products for the aerospace industry and supplies materials to the supply chains of aircraft manufacturers such as Boeing, Airbus, Lockheed Martin, and Korea Aerospace Industries (KAI). It also provides materials for defense-related applications.

=== SeAH GSI (SeAH Gulf Special Steel Industries) ===
SeAH GSI (SeAH Gulf Special Steel Industries) is a joint venture between SeAH Changwon Integrated Special Steel and Saudi Aramco. The company is located in King Salman Energy Park (SPARK) in eastern Saudi Arabia and is constructing a stainless seamless pipe and tube manufacturing plant. Completion of the facility is targeted for the fourth quarter of 2026.

=== SeAH Superalloy Technologies ===
SeAH Superalloy Technologies is a United States–based special alloy manufacturing subsidiary currently under construction. The facility is intended to supply high-value-added alloy products to the aerospace, defense, energy, and space industries in North America. Operations are scheduled to begin in the third quarter of 2026, with an expected annual production capacity of approximately 6,000 tons.
