= KAI MC-X =

South Korean proposed twin-engined airliner

MC-X

General information
- Type: military transport aircraft
- National origin: South Korea
- Manufacturer: Korea Aerospace Industries
- Status: In development

The 'KAI MC-X is an in-development twin-engined military transport aircraft that is being designed by the South Korean aircraft manufacturer Korea Aerospace Industries (KAI).

== Development ==
Work on the MC-X started during the early 2020s as an unsolicited proposal by the discussion with Korea Aerospace Industries (KAI), albeit one that has been shaped by a series of discussions with the Republic of Korea Air Force (RoKAF) to understand the service's future transport requirements. The designers intend to produce a next-generation transport aircraft suitable for multiple roles and fitting between existing platforms such as the Lockheed C-130 Hercules and the Airbus A400M Atlas airlifters. During September 2022, the existence of the MC-X was revealed to the general public; speaking at that time, a KAI spokesperson stated that the MC-X was anticipated to be ready to enter production by the early 2030s.

The configuration of the MC-X is typical of tactical airlifters, combining a high-mounted wing with a T-tail. In addition to being a twin-engine aircraft, its dimensions are roughly 40 meters in length, 13.5 meters in height, and 41.1 meters in width, possessing a maximum take-off weight of 92,000 kg and a payload capacity of up to 30,000 kg. Specific payloads that can be carried shall include up to seven 463L pallets at full height along with a further two low-height ones; a single K55A1 self-propelled howitzer or a K21 infantry fighting vehicle could also be carried. In terms of personnel, up to 92 troops or 74 paratroopers are intended to be carried by a single MC-X.

It has been anticipated that the airlifter will be powered by a pair of turbofan engines that are expected to deliver around 30,000 lb of thrust and provide a maximum speed of 926 kmph and a cruising range of 7,000 kilometres. It is planned to be equipped with a self-defence system and an automated loading system. While early development and production work had been expected to be performed entirely in-house by KAI, the company was reportedly open to the involvement of an overseas industrial partner under suitable circumstances. In addition to the domestic market, the MC-X could be potentially offered on the export market as a competitor to mid-size military airlifters such as the Kawasaki C-2 and the Embraer C-390 Millennium.

KAI has also proposed a shortened version of the MC-X that would be optionally fitted with an extended wing for increases range, which has been anticipated as being useful for performing specialised roles, such as maritime patrol, airborne early warning, communications relay, signal intelligence and stand-off jamming. KAI has stated that both the Republic of Korea Army and Republic of Korea Navy could be potential customers for certain configurations, such as for the transportation of special forces and maritime patrol duties. Furthermore, it has been indicated that variants of the MC-X could be used as a mother ship for unmanned aerial vehicles and even as a platform to launching rockets into space.

In January 2023, it was announced that South Korea had signed a memorandum of understanding (MoU) with the United Arab Emirates to jointly develop the MC-X beyond the concept stage. In June of that year, KAI presented a maritime patrol variant of the MC-X, and stated that this version was being prepared as a replacement for the RoKAF's existing fleet of CASA/IPTN CN-235 tactical transport aircraft.

== See also ==
Aircraft of comparable role, configuration, and era

- Airbus A400M Atlas – Multi-national four-engine turboprop military transport aircraft
- Embraer C-390 Millennium – Brazilian military transport aircraft/tanker
- Kawasaki C-2 – Japanese military transport aircraft
