= Hyundai Space and Aircraft =

South Korean aerospace company

Hyundai Space and Aircraft Co., Ltd.
- Native name: 현대우주항공주식회사
- Company type: Public
- Industry: Aerospace
- Founded: 1 March 1994; 32 years ago
- Defunct: December 2001
- Fate: Merged into Korea Aerospace Industries
- Successors: Korea Aerospace Industries
- Headquarters: Hyundai Bldg., 140-2, Kye-dong, Chongno-gu, Seoul, South Korea
- Key people: Kim Dong-jin
- Products: Aircraft; Spacecraft
- Parent: Hyundai Group

- Hyundai Space and Aircraft
- Hangul: 현대우주항공
- Hanja: 現代宇宙航空
- RR: Hyeondae uju hanggong
- MR: Hyŏndae uju hanggong

Hyundai Space and Aircraft Co., Ltd. (HYSA; Korean: 현대우주항공) was a subsidiary of Hyundai Group's aerospace division established in March 1994. Its main business areas were industrial machinery and plant facilities, industrial robots, manufacturing spacecraft and aircraft and parts, air transport, and auto parts manufacturing and sales. In July 1995, it was designated as a defense contractor by the Ministry of Trade, Industry and Energy (MOTIE).

== History ==
In August 1994, it was selected as the company responsible for the development of the power system of the KOMPSAT (Korean Multi-Purpose Satellite) program.

In July 1995, it was designated as the main defense contractor by the Ministry of Trade, Industry and Energy.

In February 1996, it signed a contract to produce the main wing of the Boeing 717.

In July 1997, it took over the transmission manufacturing business from Hyundai Engineering & Construction.

In 1999, after separating the aircraft business as part of the restructuring, it invested in kind in the Korea Aerospace Industries (KAI).

In December 2001, the corporation was disestablished after transferring the helicopter operation and aircraft parts production business to Korea Aerospace Industries.
