= SeAh Steel Holdings =

South Korean company

SeAH Steel Holdings
- Native name: 세아제강지주
- Type: Public
- Traded as: KRX: 003030
- Industry: Steel pipe
- Founded: October 1960
- Founder: Lee Jong-Deok
- Headquarters: SeAH Tower, 45, yanghwa-ro, Mapo-gu, Seoul, South Korea
- Key people: Lee Joo-sung (CEO); and (President), Kim Tai-hyun (Executive Vice President)
- Products: Steel pipes and steel sheets
- Revenue: 3,675,086,864,147 KRW (2024)
- Number of employees: 733 (2017)
- Subsidiaries: SeAH Steel; SeAH Coated Metal; SeAH Steel USA; SeAh Wind
- Website: http://www.seahsteel.co.kr

SeAh Steel Holdings (formerly SeAh Steel Corporation) is a South Korean holding company located in Seoul, South Korea. It was founded as a steel manufacturer in 1960 by Lee Jong-Deok with the name of Pusan Steel Pipe Industry Corporation.

In 2018, the SeAh Steel Corporation split into two separate entities, SeAh Steel Holdings, a holding group for SeAh's foreign affiliate companies, and SeAh Steel, which kept the steel manufacturing activities.

The company operates seven steel mills worldwide with locations in the United States, Vietnam, United Arab Emirates, and Italy. And SeAh Wind's offshore wind foundation factory in Teesside, UK.

== SeAh Steel ==
SeAh Steel remains the main subsidiary of SeAh Steel Holdings after it transitioned into two separate entities in 2018.

SeAh Steel is the largest Korean steel pipe manufacturer and its main products consist of steel pipes, titanium tubes, stainless steel pipes and galvanized color steel sheets. It currently runs four plants in South Korea, located in Pohang, Gunsan, Suncheon and Changwon.

== Management ==
As of 2022, SeAh Steel Holdings corporate leadership is headed by President and CEO Lee Joo-sung. He plays a primary role in managing the company's business operations and diversifying the company activities. Lee Joo-sung led SeAh Steel Holdings into the renewable energy market by creating the UK-based subsidiary SeAh Wind's offshore wind foundation factory in Teesside, UK.

== Other affiliates ==
- Domestic

SeAH Coated Metal

- Overseas

SeAH Steel America
State Pipe & Supply
SeAH Steel USA
SeAH Japan
SeAH Steel Vina
Vietnam Steel Pipe
SeAH Steel UAE
INOX TECH (SeAH Steel Europe)
SeAH Steel Indonesia
Landmark Steel
SeAH Wind
