= Lee Tae-sung (businessman) =

South Korean businessman (born 1978)

- 이태성
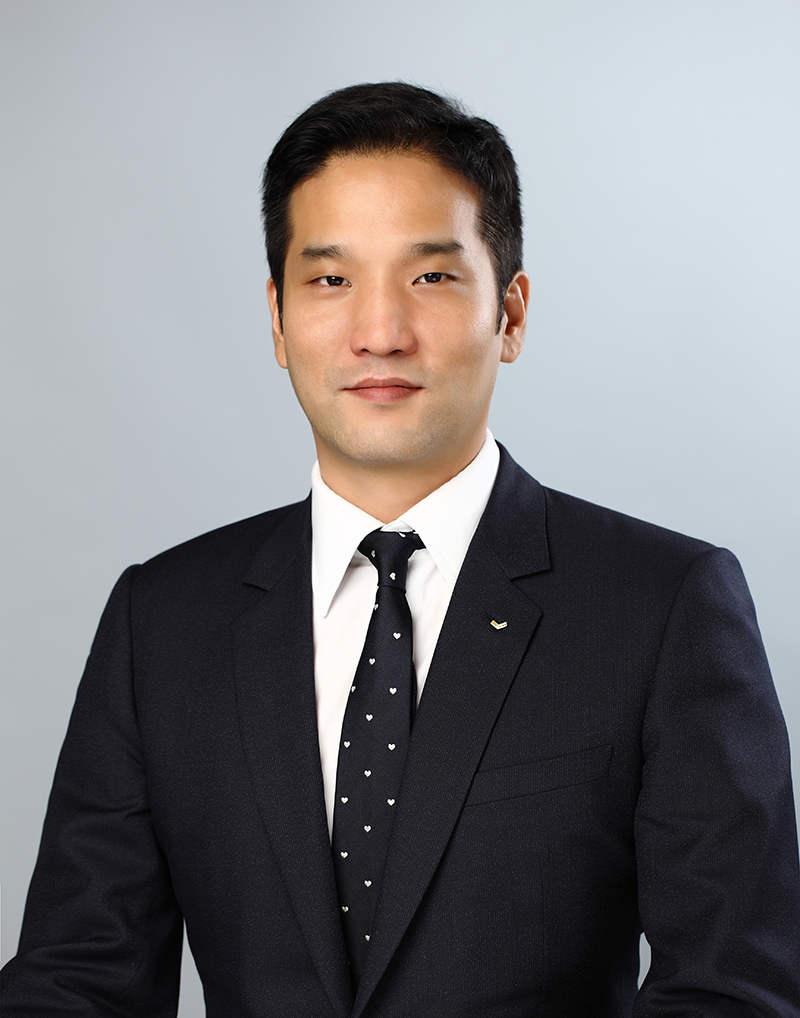
- Born: 11 August 1978 (age 48); Seoul, South Korea
- Education: University of Michigan; Tsinghua University
- Occupation: Businessman
- Known for: CEO of SeAH Holdings and SeAH Besteel Holdings Corp., Chairman of Korea Table Tennis Association
- Board member of: SeAH Besteel Holdings, SeAH Holdings
- Spouse: Chae Mun-seon

Lee Tae-sung (born 1978) is a South Korean businessman. He is the president and CEO of SeAH Holdings, a Korean mid-size steel conglomerate. Lee is also chairman of the board and President at SeAH Besteel Holdings, a major affiliate of the group.

After his father and late chairman Lee Woon-Hyung died in 2013, he is the largest shareholder in SeAH Holdings, owning a 44.5% stake.

== Early life and education ==
Lee Tae-sung was born on 11 August 1978, in Seoul. He is the eldest son of late SeAH Group Chairman Lee Woon-Hyung and grandson the corporation's founder Lee Jong-deok. This makes him a third-generation descendant of the conglomerate.

In 2000, he majored in psychology and journalism at the University of Michigan and received an MBA from the Business School of Tsinghua. Before he started his business career, completed his military service as an active-duty soldier in the ROK Army.

== Career ==
Lee started working at SeAH Japan in 2006, and became Head of Strategic Planning at SeAH Holdings in 2009. When his father, chairman Woon-Hyung Lee died in 2013, Lee Tae-sung inherited his father's shares in SeAH Holdings and SeAH Steel and became the group's largest shareholder. The following year he was promoted as CEO and Head of Strategic Planning for SeAH Besteel Corporation. Four years later, at age 42, took over as CEO of SeAH Holdings Corp., not without controversy.

Lee Tae-sung has established international branches including America, Germany, Thailand and India in order to diversify and secure the family business.

=== Strategic global expansion and investment ===
He is currently focused on discovering new growth engines through strategic investments aimed at global market expansion.
Under his leadership, SeAH Besteel Holdings established SeAH Gulf Special Steel Industries in 2022. This joint venture with Aramco in Saudi Arabia produces seamless steel pipes. Then, in 2024, SeAH Superalloy Technologies, a North American production subsidiary, was formed to meet the demand for special alloys in the North American market.

=== Leadership in table tennis ===
He demonstrates a strong commitment to young table tennis talent. The Korea Table Tennis Association established the SeAH Academy in 2022, sponsored by SeAH. This was followed by the creation of the SeAH Table Tennis Team in 2024. In November 2024, he was elected Chairman of the Korea Table Tennis Association.

== Personal life ==
He is married Chai Moon-sun, daughter of Aekyung Group's vice chairman Chai Hyung-seok.

== Positions ==
Name	Title	Since
SeAH Besteel Holdings Corporation	Chief Executive Officer & President	2022
SeAH Holdings Corporation	Chief Executive Officer & President	2022
SeAH CSS Corp.	Director & Executive Director	(2015 – 2018)
Irongrey	Chief Executive Officer and Director	2015
Korea Table Tennis Association	Chairman	Nov, 2024
