= Korea Aerospace Industries =

South Korean Aerospace company

Korea Aerospace Industries, Ltd.

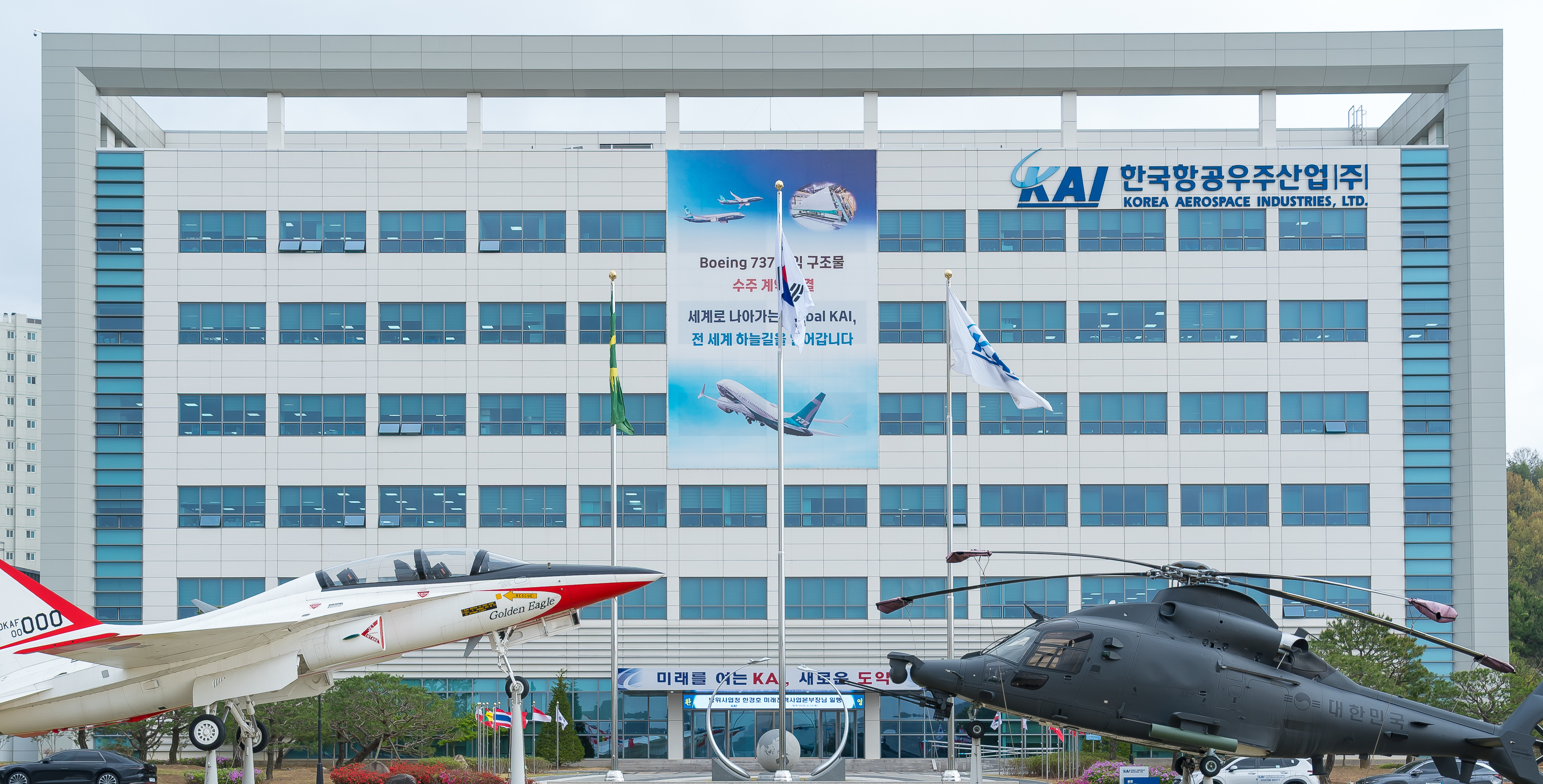
- Headquarters in Sacheon, South Gyeongsang Province
- Native name: 한국항공우주산업주식회사
- Type: Public
- Traded as: KRX: 047810
- Industry: Aerospace; Defense
- Predecessors: Daewoo Heavy Industries; Hyundai Space and Aircraft; Samsung Aerospace
- Founded: 1 October 1999; 27 years ago
- Headquarters: 78, Gongdanro 1-ro, Sanam-myeon, Sacheon-si, Gyeongsangnam-do, South Korea
- Area served: Worldwide
- Key people: Kim Jong-chool (CEO)
- Products: Fixed-wing aircraft; Helicopters; Satellites; Simulators; Space launch vehicles; Unmanned aerial vehicles
- Revenue: ▲ ₩3.6964 trillion (2025)
- Operating income: ▲ ₩269.2 billion (2025)
- Net income: ▲ ₩187.3 billion (2025)
- Total assets: ▲ ₩10.3703 trillion (2025)
- Total equity: ▲ ₩1.8973 trillion (2025)
- Owner: Export–Import Bank of Korea (26.41%); Hanwha Aerospace (12.44%); National Pension Service (8.12%); Fidelity Management & Research (6.77%); Employee stock ownership (1.10%)
- Number of employees: 5,222 (March, 2024)
- Subsidiaries: Aviosys Technologies; Korea Aviation Engineering & Maintenance Service; S&K Aerospace
- Website: Official website in English; Official website in Korean

- Korea Aerospace Industries
- Hangul: 한국항공우주산업
- Hanja: 韓國航空宇宙産業
- RR: Hanguk hanggong uju saneop
- MR: Han'guk hanggong uju sanŏp

Korea Aerospace Industries, Ltd. (KAI; Korean: 한국항공우주산업) is a South Korean aerospace and defense manufacturer. It was originally established as a joint venture of Daewoo Heavy Industries' aerospace division, Samsung Aerospace, and Hyundai Space and Aircraft. During 1999, KAI became more independent of its founding members, acquiring their aerospace interests at the behest of the South Korean government following the financial troubles of these companies that had resulted from the 1997 Asian financial crisis.

KAI has developed various aerospace products, including the Korean Space Launch Vehicle-II (KSLV-II) and various satellites. It has been involved in the production of several foreign-designed aircraft via licensing arrangements, such as the MBB/Kawasaki BK 117, MBB Bo-105 KLH, and the KF-16. KAI has also developed and produced its own aircraft designs, including the KT-1 Woongbi and T-50 Golden Eagle training aircraft, the KC-100 Naraon general aviation aircraft, and the KUH-1 Surion utility helicopter. Both the company's headquarters and several key manufacturing facilities are located in Sacheon, South Gyeongsang Province.

== Projects ==
KAI was involved in the production of the first indigenously developed South Korean aircraft, the KT-1 Woongbi; it was developed under the KTX program, which had been launched during 1988 on behalf of the Republic of Korea Air Force (ROKAF) to develop an indigenously designed trainer aircraft. It was a joint effort between KAI and government body Agency for Defense Development (ADD); the latter was responsible for overseeing the project, while the former performed the detailed design work as well as the majority of manufacturing activity. During 2002, KAI revealed that they were working on the production of an upgraded and armed version of the KT-1, designated KO-1, which was intended to be used in the forward air control and counter-insurgency (COIN) roles. Development was conducted in cooperation with the ADD and had been undertaken in response to an existing RKAF requirement for 20-40 aircraft.

During June 2006, KAI and Eurocopter won a ₩1.3 trillion (US$1.99 billion) research and development contract for the Korea Helicopter Project - Korea Utility Helicopter (KHP-KUH) from the Defense Acquisition Program Administration (DAPA) to start the project. The development of the rotorcraft, the KUH-1 Surion, was funded 84% by the South Korean government and 16% by KAI and Eurocopter. At the time, it was the biggest South Korean defense contract to be issued to a non-American defense company. In January 2011, Eurocopter and KAI established a joint venture, KAI-EC, for the purposes of marketing the Surion and handling export sales; at the time, it was envisioned that 250-300 units would be sold worldwide by 2021. In December 2012, deliveries of the first Surion model formally commenced. In February 2013, low temperature testing in Alaska, United States, was completed, leading to development of the KUH-1 Surion being formally recognized as completed in the following month. The Surion served as the basis for a navalised derivative, the Korean Naval Helicopter (KNH); by 2011, the KNH had entered into the development stage; work was being performed on the project by a partnership between KAI, Eurocopter, and Elbit Systems. In January 2016, following completion of development work on the amphibious variant of the Surion, it was announced that this variant had been cleared to enter production later that year.

Keen to beak into the civilian market and reduce its reliance on government projects, KAI formally launched development of the KC-100 Naraon general aviation aircraft during 2008. While largely conventional in its basic configuration, use of composite materials and the adoption of cutting-edge technologies were intended to allow it to be 10% more fuel efficient than existing rivals. The flight test program was completed successfully on 22 March 2013, the aircraft's type certificate being received shortly thereafter. During the 2010s, KAI commenced development of a military trainer variant, designated KT-100, for the ROKAF; the first aircraft of this model first flew during 2015. Once delivered, the KT-100 fleet will replace the 20 Ilyushin Il-103 aircraft currently stationed at the ROKAF's academy for training student pilots.

In 2008, KAI studied a 60-seat KRJ regional jet: a T-tail, four-abreast aircraft able to be stretched to 100 seats, similar to the Bombardier CRJ. Two years later, the company was reportedly still considering launching a 90-seat turboprop; it was then believed that an announcement could occur as early as 2011. In October 2012, a joint development deal between Bombardier Aerospace and a government-led South Korean consortium was revealed, to develop a 90-seater turboprop regional airliner, targeting a 2019 launch date. The consortium would include both KAI and Korean Air Lines. Despite this announcement, KAI continued to study the prospective 90-seat regional airliner for several more years.

During 2019, it was announced that KAI is to manufacture the wings of the Gulfstream G280 business jet on behalf of Israeli manufacturer IAI, taking over from the Triumph Group; the company is contracted 300 sets until 2030 for $529 million, at a new factory at Goseong, 30 km (20 mi) from its Sacheon main plant. In the long term, the company reportedly has ambitions to license-produce a civil aircraft from 2023; it also seeks to develop a 50-70 seat regional airliner, powered either by turboprop or turbofan engines. The latter is set to complete exploratory development by 2022; a 2030 introduction date has been set.

== Products ==
=== Fixed-wing aircraft ===
- KAI KT-1 Woongbi (2000) - turboprop engine basic trainer
  - KAI KA-1 (2006) - armed airborne controller
- KAI KC-100 Naraon (2011) - four-seat, single piston engine general aviation aircraft
  - KAI KT-100 (2015) - military variant, basic trainer
- KAI T-50 Golden Eagle (2005) - supersonic advanced jet trainer
  - KAI FA-50 Fighting Eagle (2013) - supersonic light combat aircraft
- KAI KF-21 Boramae (2026) - supersonic multirole fighter
- KAI MC-X (research and development) - advanced military transport aircraft to be developed with the United Arab Emirates
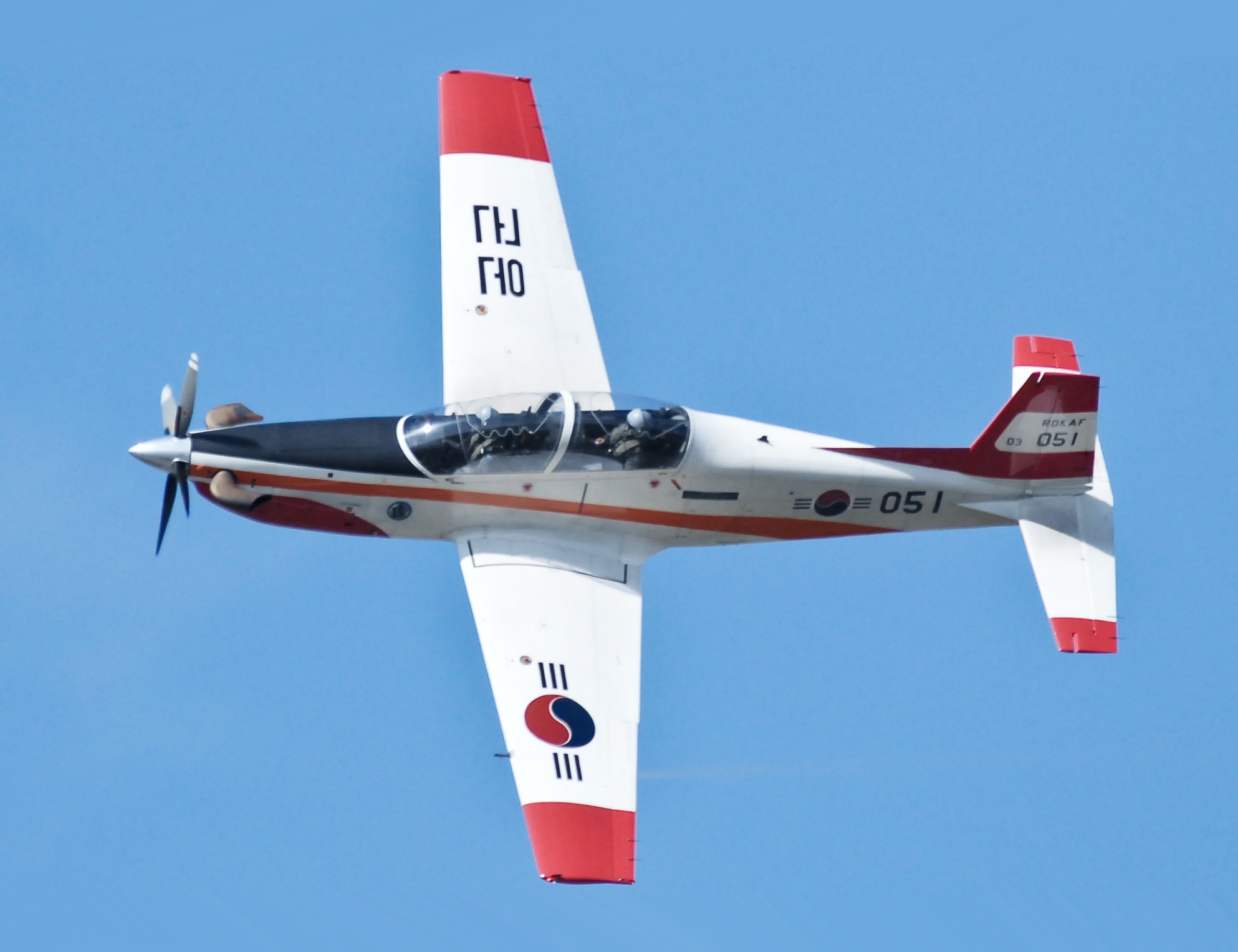
KT-1 Woongbi basic trainer

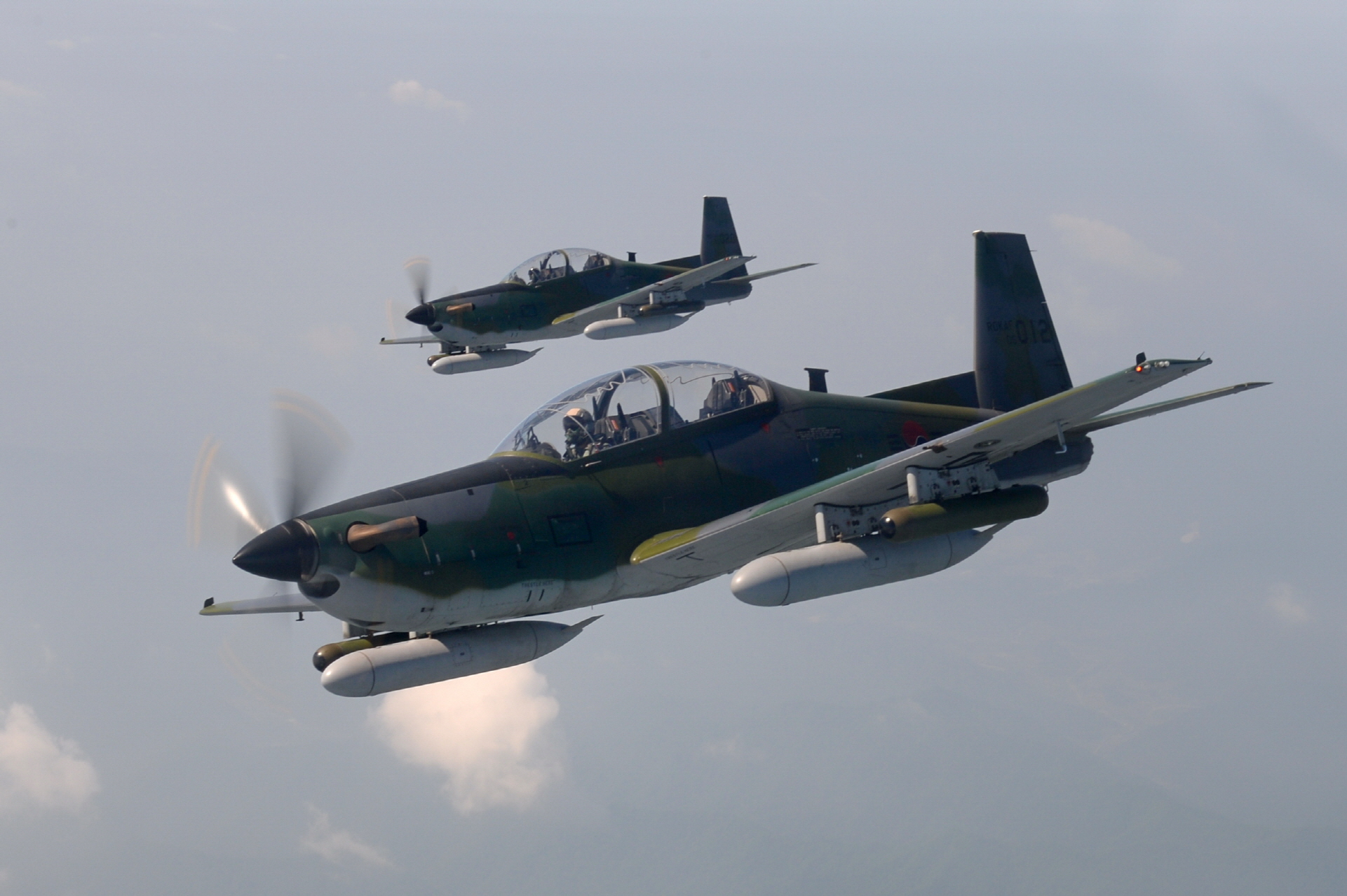
KA-1 armed airborne controller

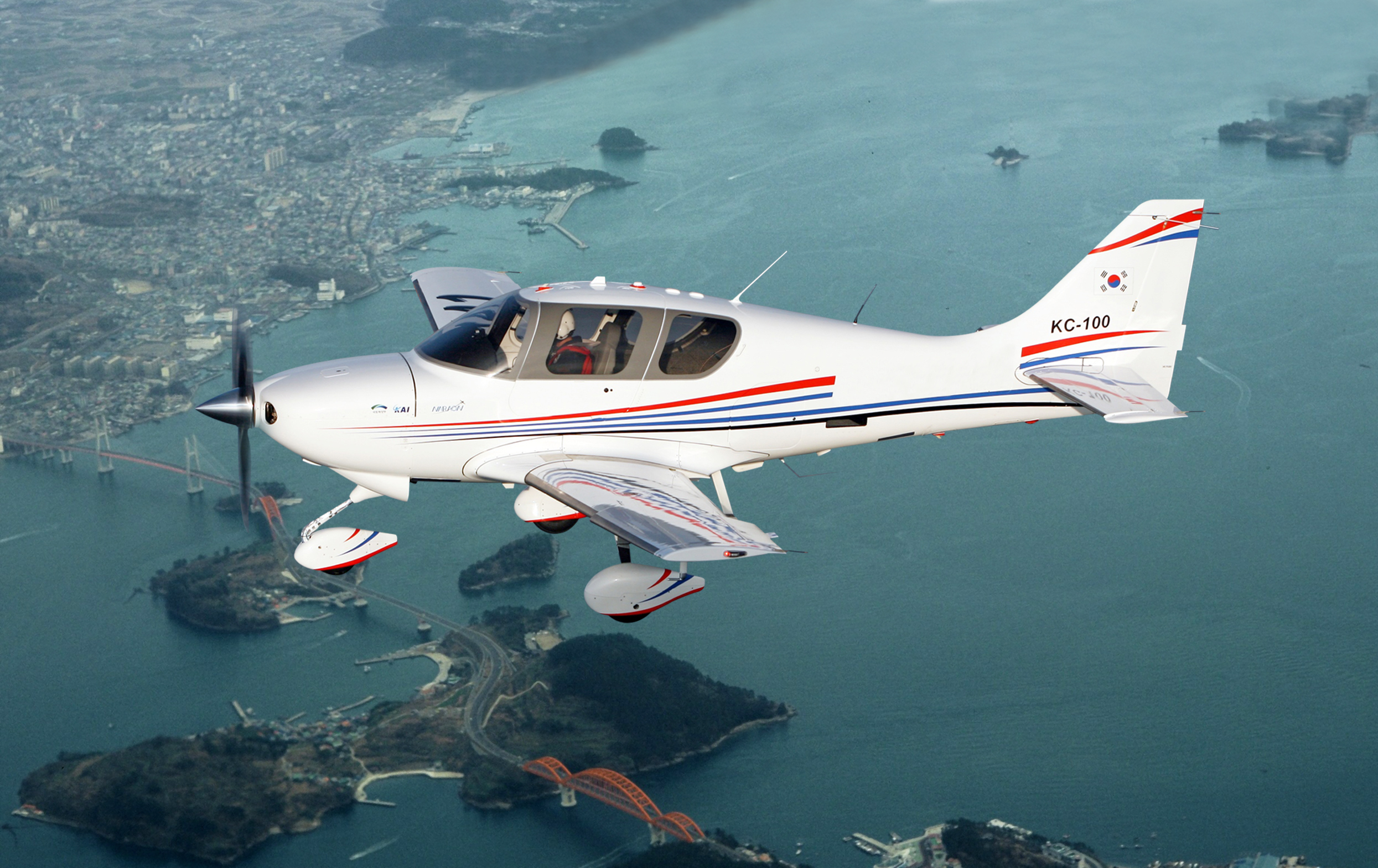
KC-100 light aircraft

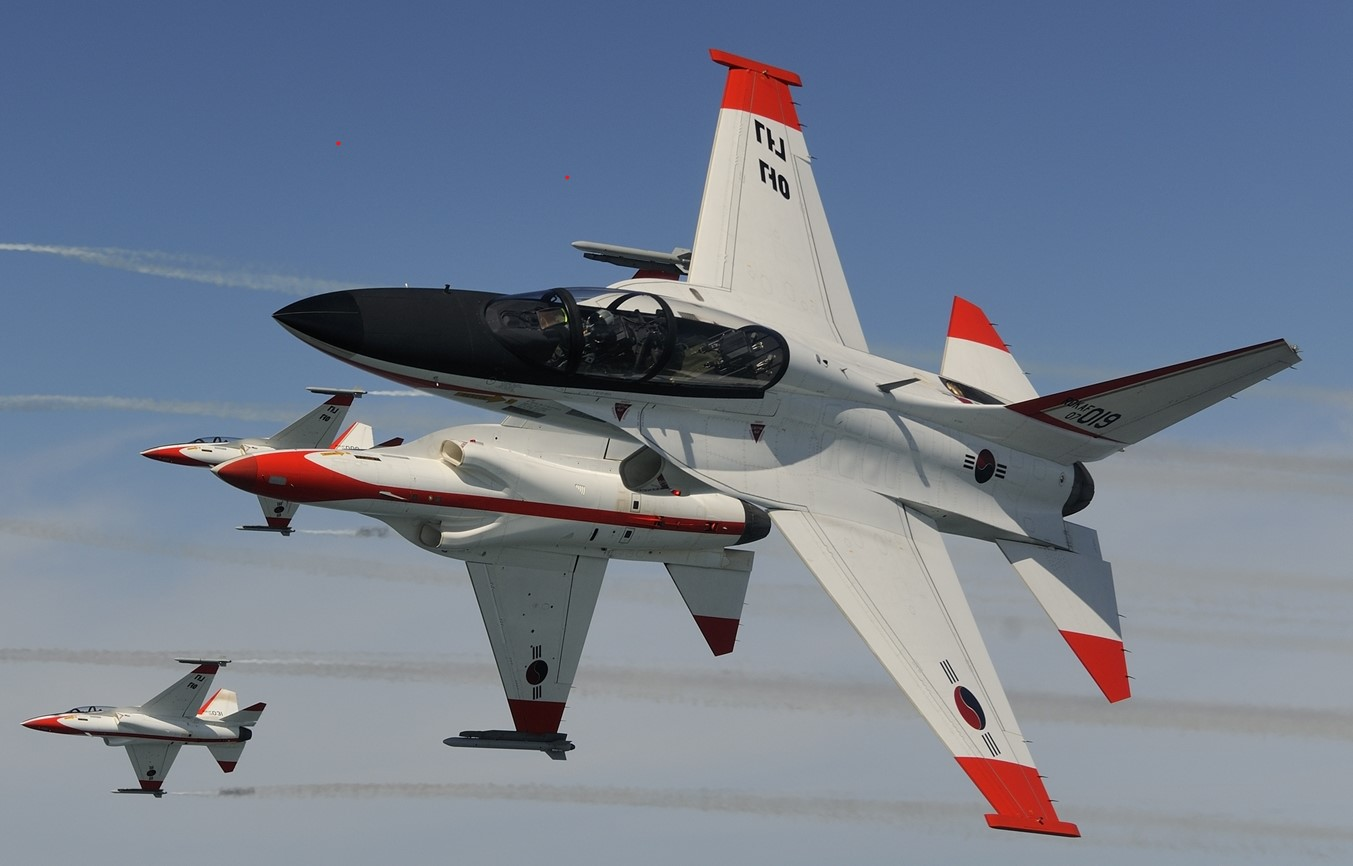
T-50 Golden Eagle advanced trainer

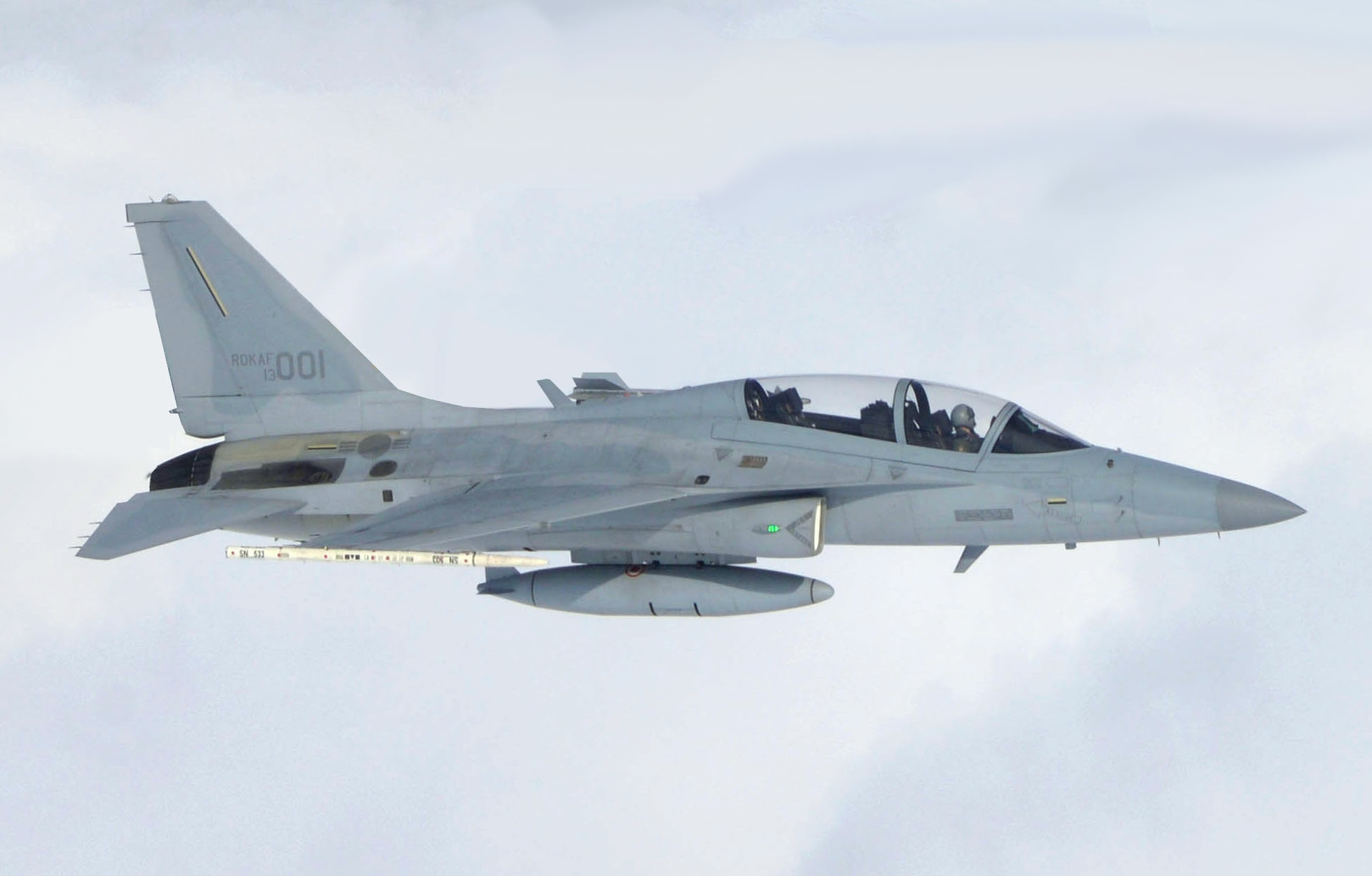
FA-50 Fighting Eagle light combat aircraft

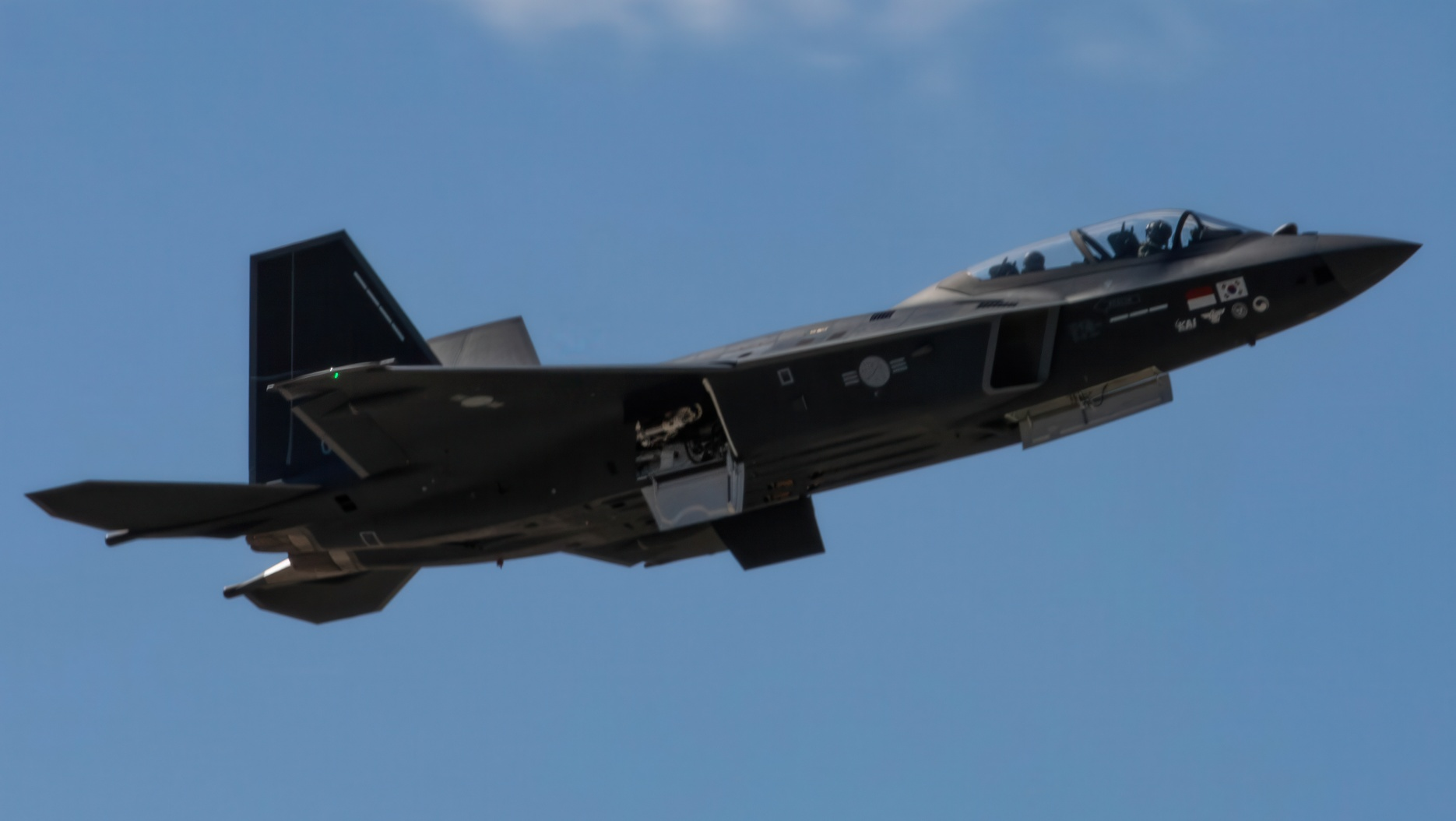
KF-21 Boramae multirole fighter

=== Helicopters ===
- KAI KUH-1 Surion (2013) - medium transport helicopter
- KAI LAH-1 Miron (2024) - military armed helicopter
- KAI LCH (2022) - civil transport helicopter
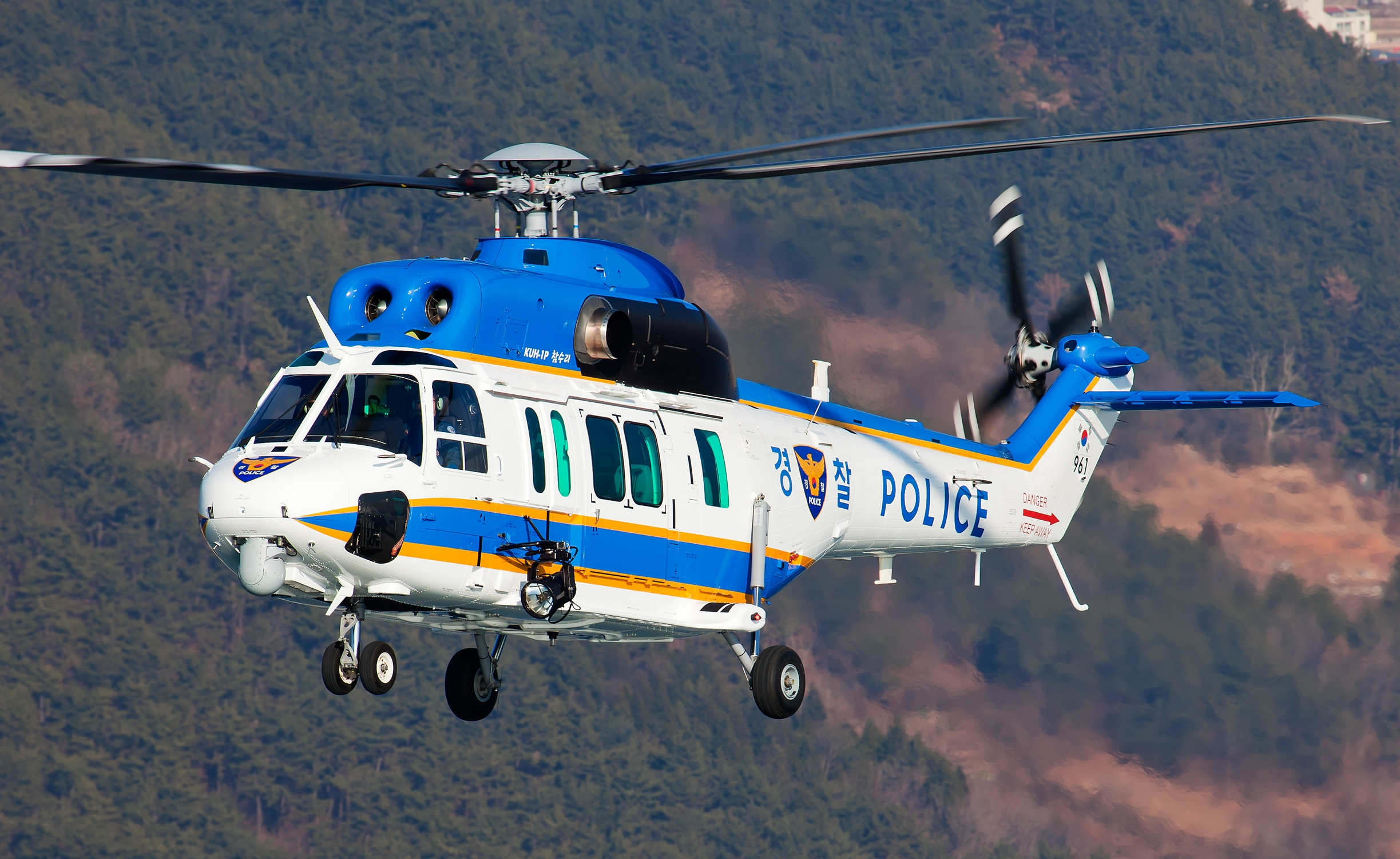
KUH-1 Surion medium transport helicopter

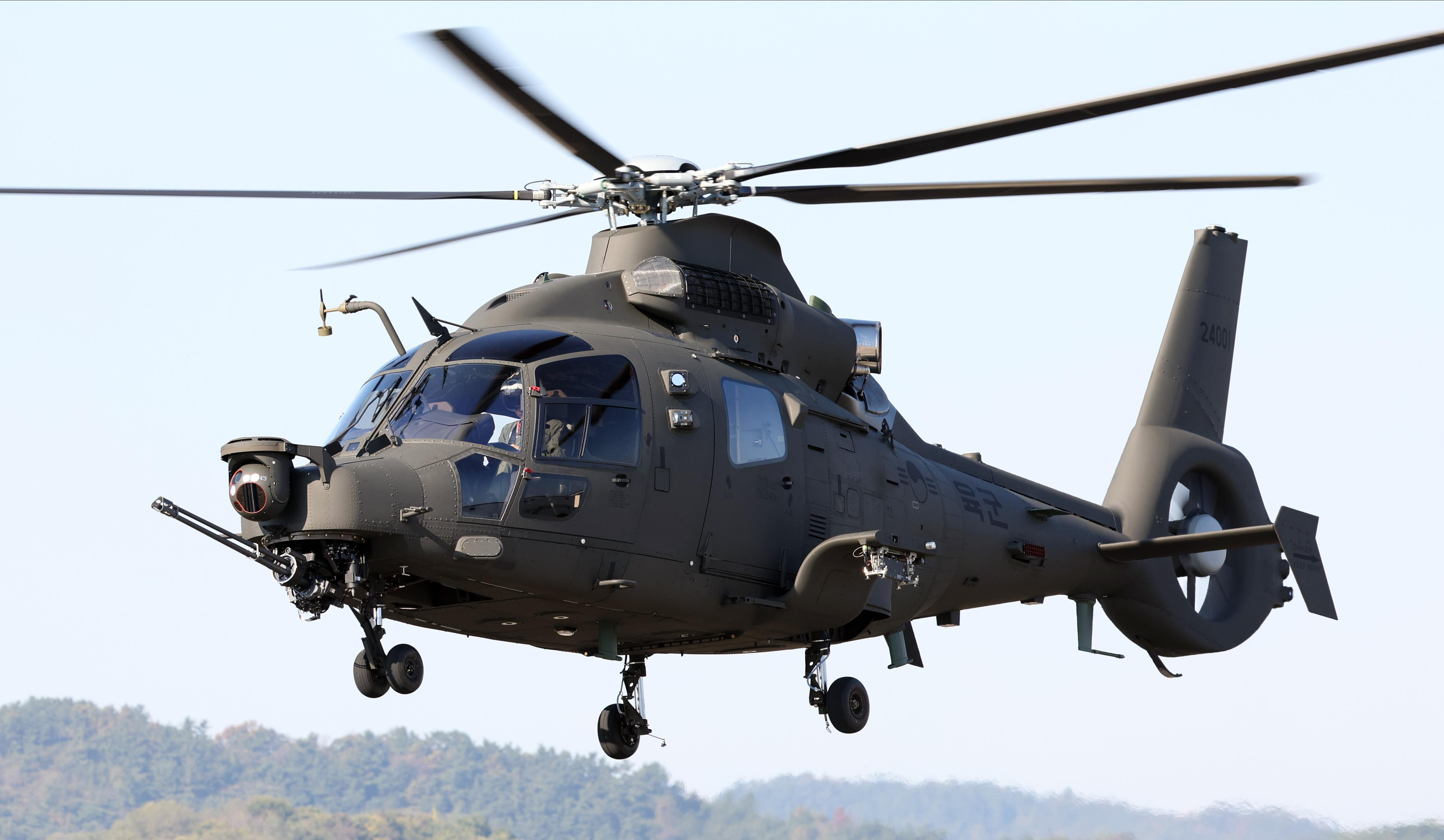
LAH-1 Miron armed helicopter

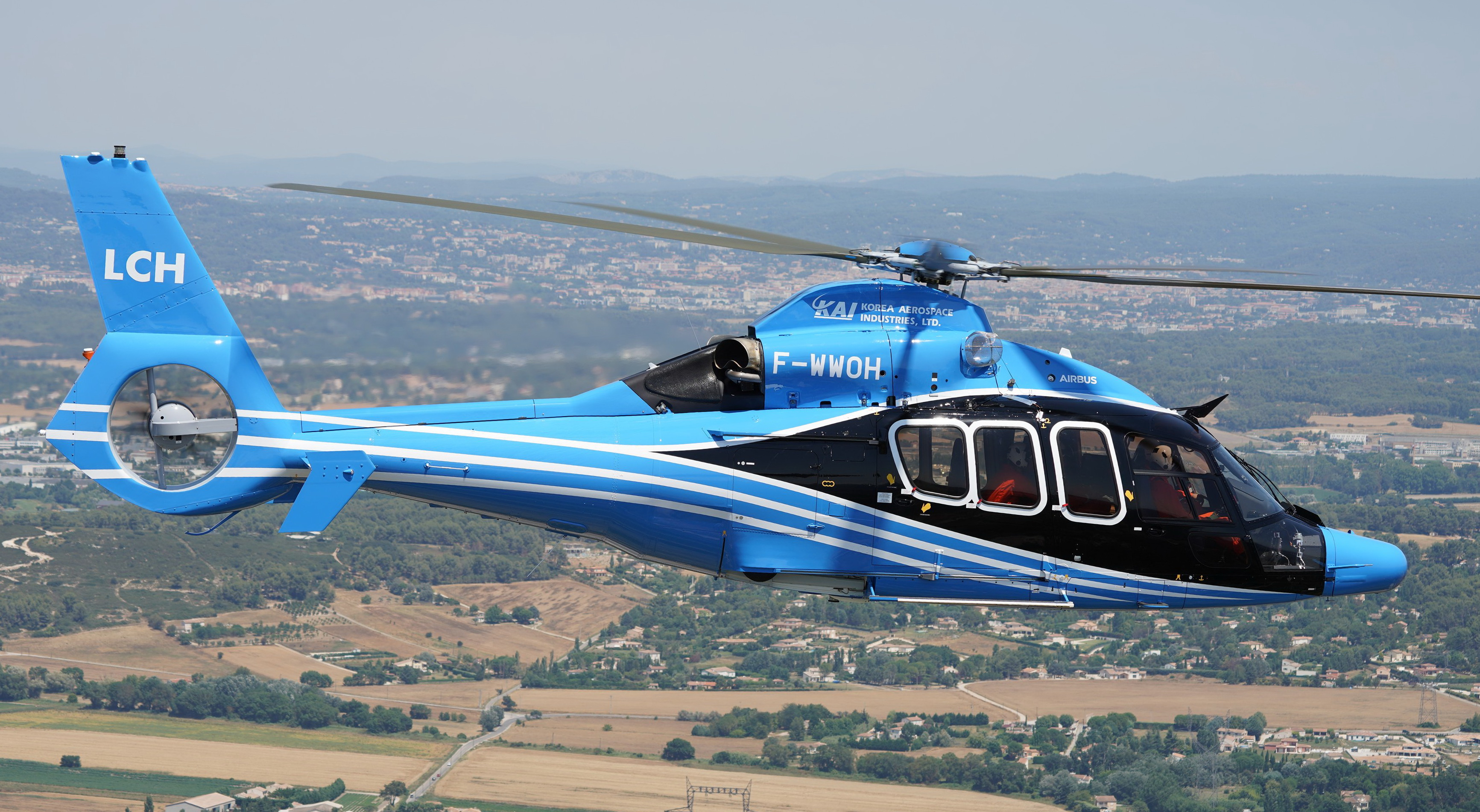
LCH civil transport helicopter

=== Unmanned aerial vehicles ===
- KAI RQ-101 Songgolmae (2000) - military unmanned surveillance and reconnaissance aerial vehicle
- KAI NCUAV (development) - next generation corps level reconnaissance UAV for South Korean Army
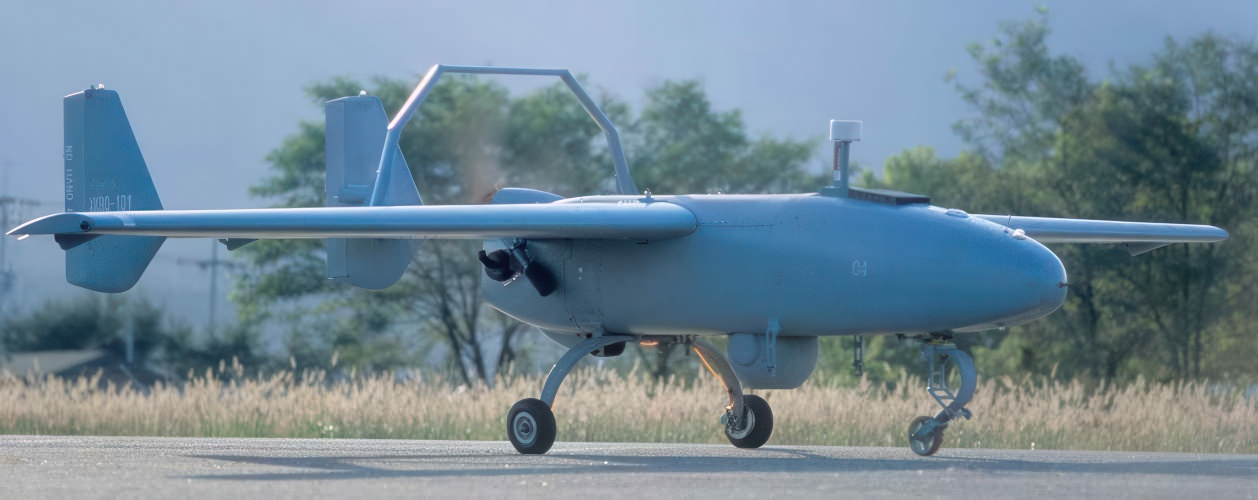
RQ-101 Songgolmae unmanned aerial vehicle

=== Space launch vehicles ===
- Korean Space Launch Vehicle-II (2021) - The Korean Space Launch Vehicle-II (Nuri) has been designed to generate a combined thrust of 300 tons by tying in parallel four 75 ton-class liquid fuel-powered engines. KSLV 2 is the launcher earmarked for the spacecraft that South Korea proposes to send to the moon by 2022. A lunar lander is supposed to follow in 2030.
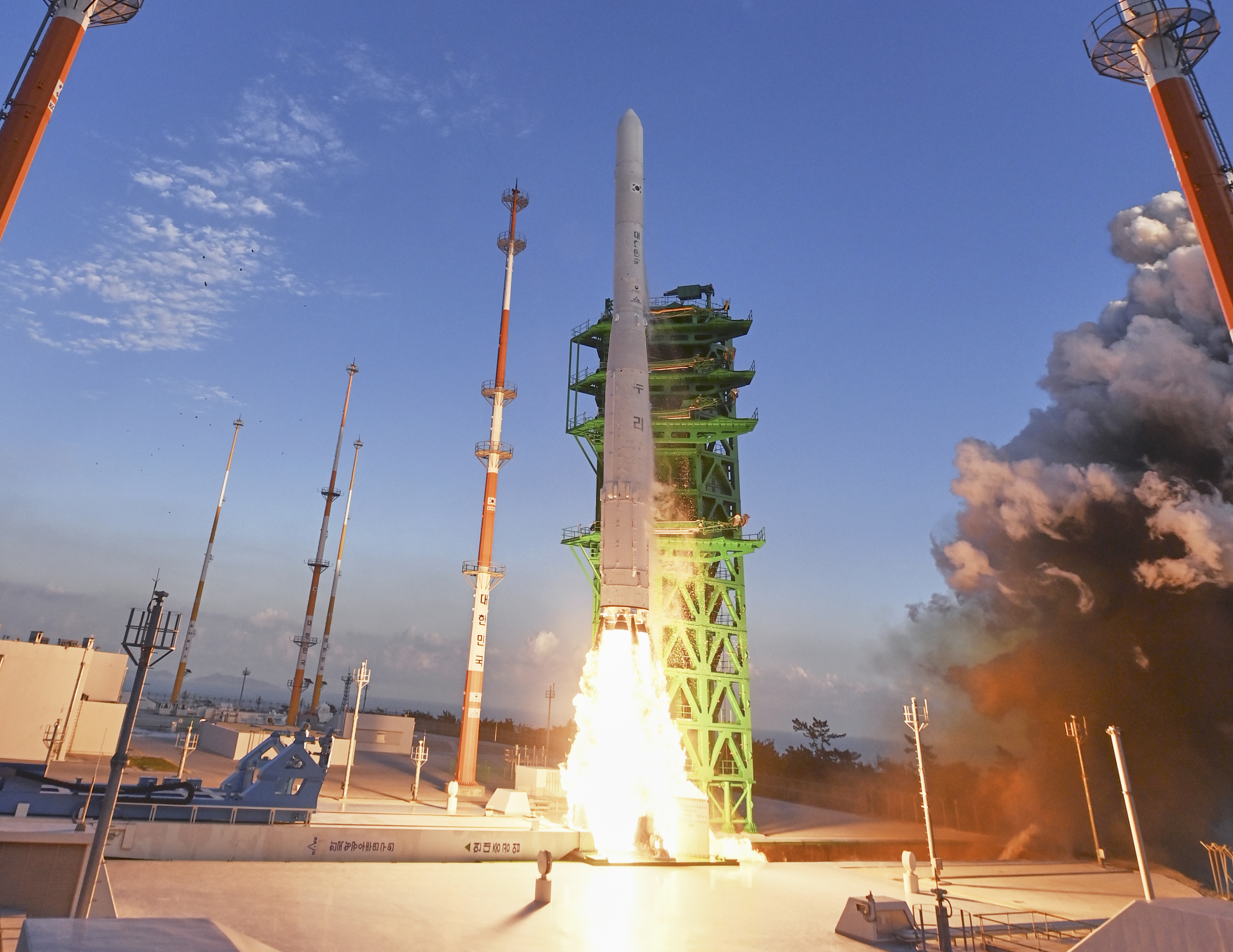
The first flight of the Korean Space Launch Vehicle-II at the Naro Space Center on October 21, 2021.

=== Satellites ===
==== Electro-optical satellites ====
- KOMPSAT-1
- KOMPSAT-2
- KOMPSAT-3
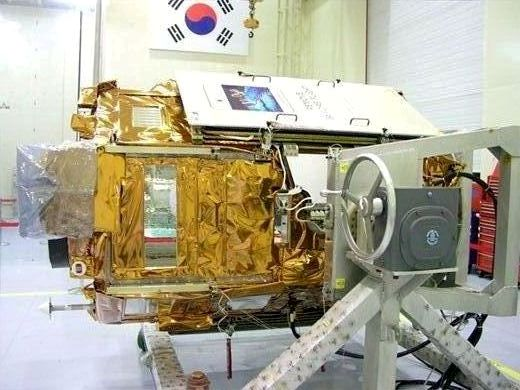
Arirang-1 earth imaging satellite

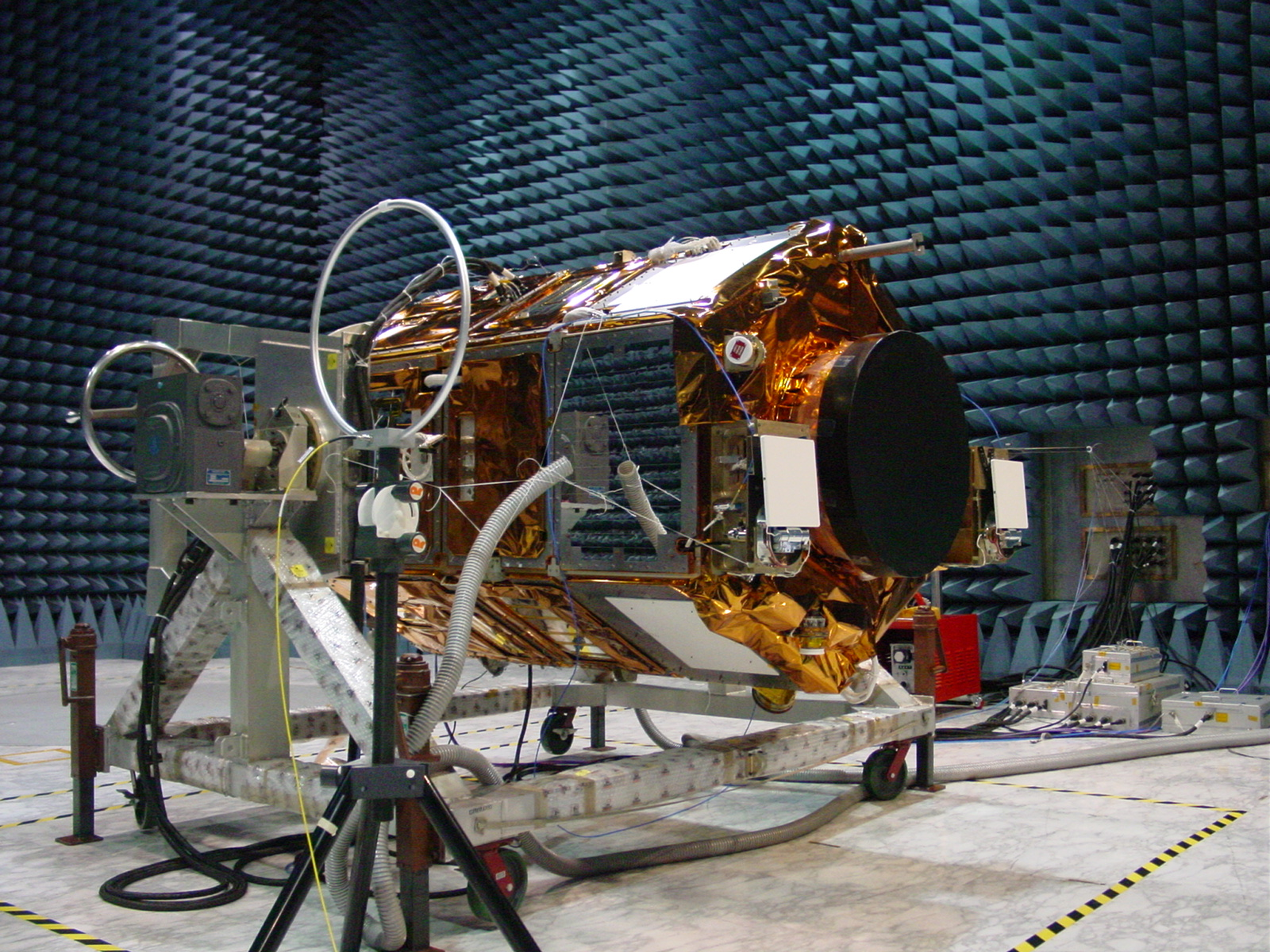
Arirang-2 earth imaging satellite

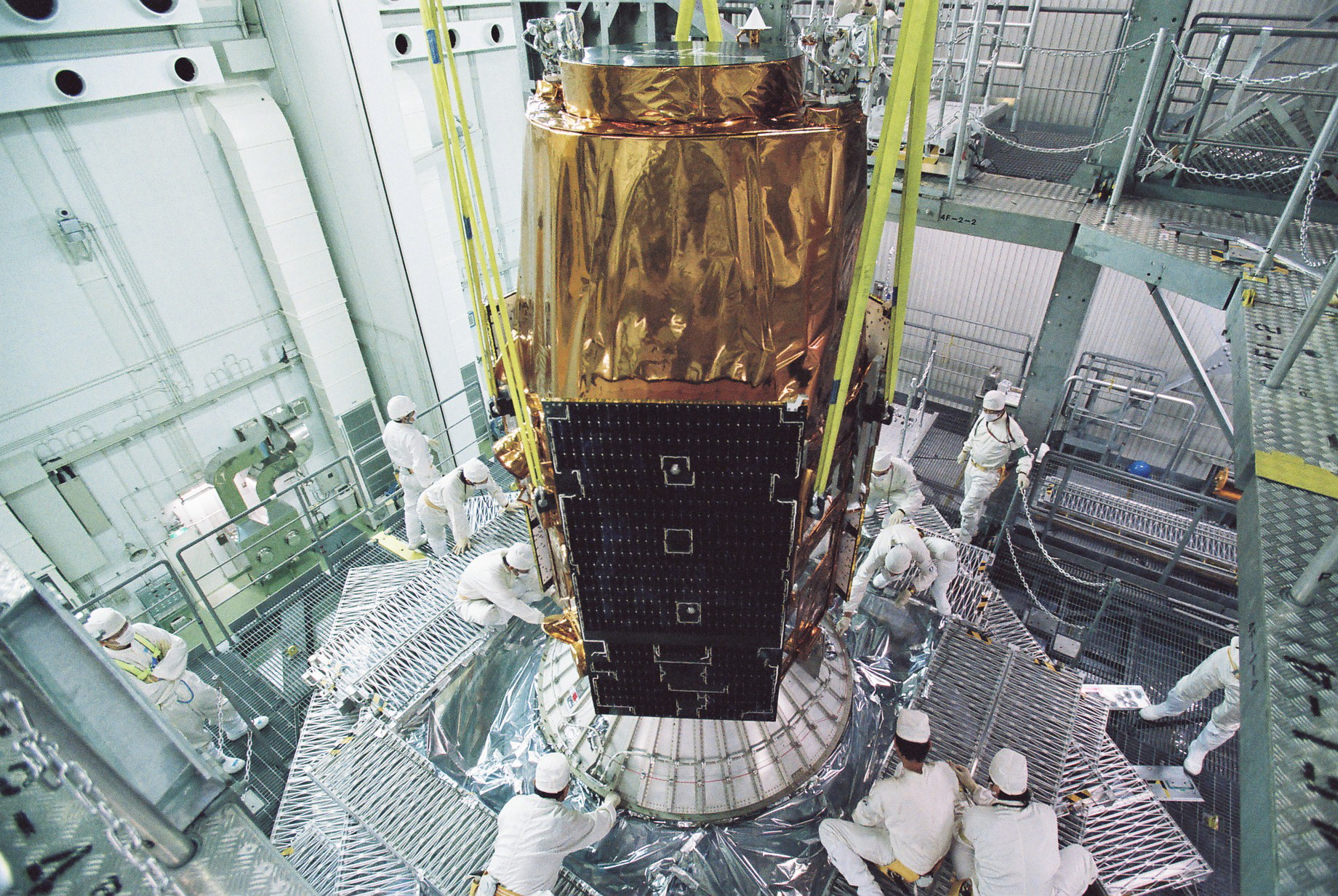
Arirang-3 earth imaging satellite

==== Synthetic aperture radar satellites ====
- KOMPSAT-5
- KOMPSAT-6
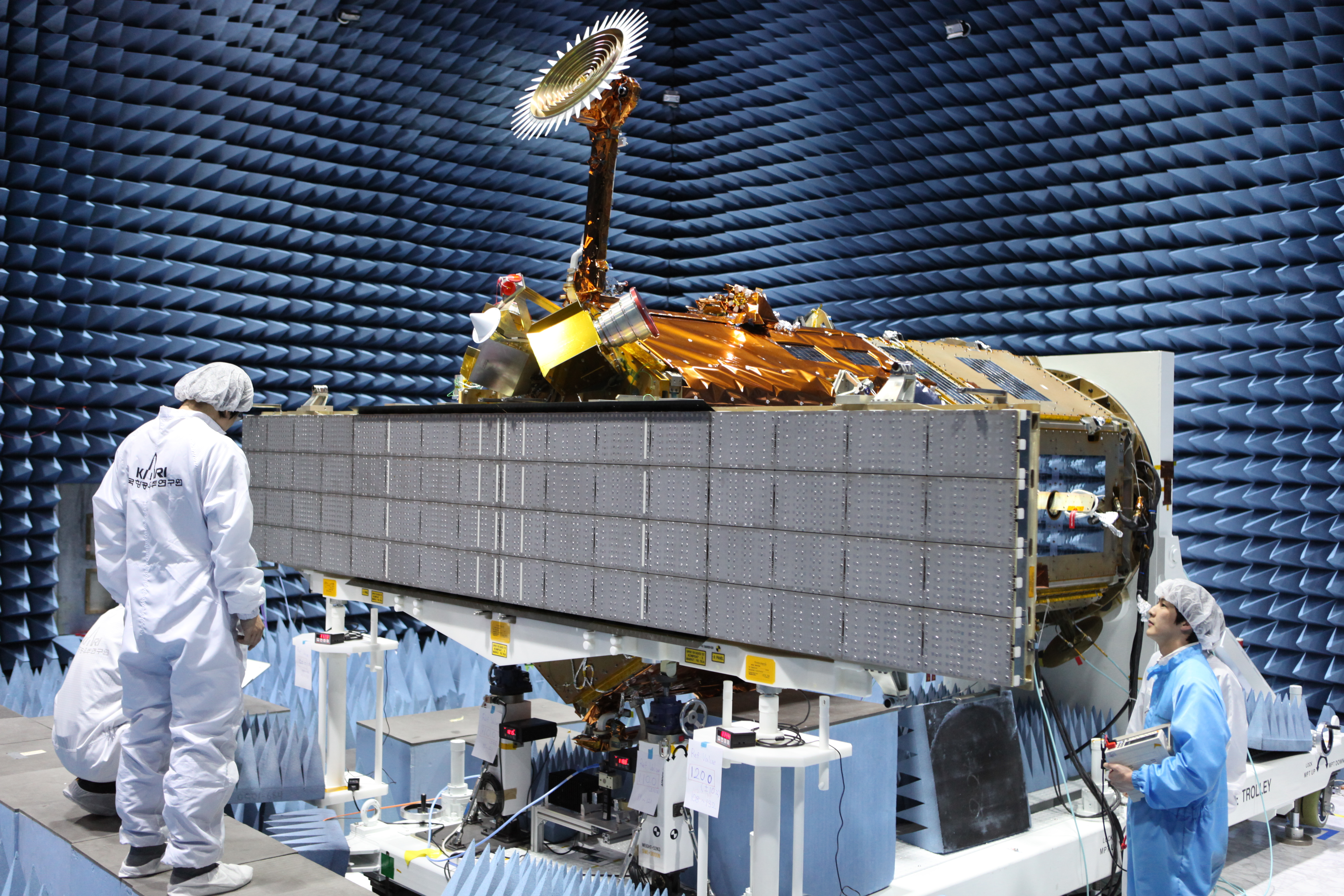
Arirang-5 earth observation satellite

==== Electro-optical/infrared satellites ====
- KOMPSAT-3A
- KOMPSAT-7
- KOMPSAT-7A
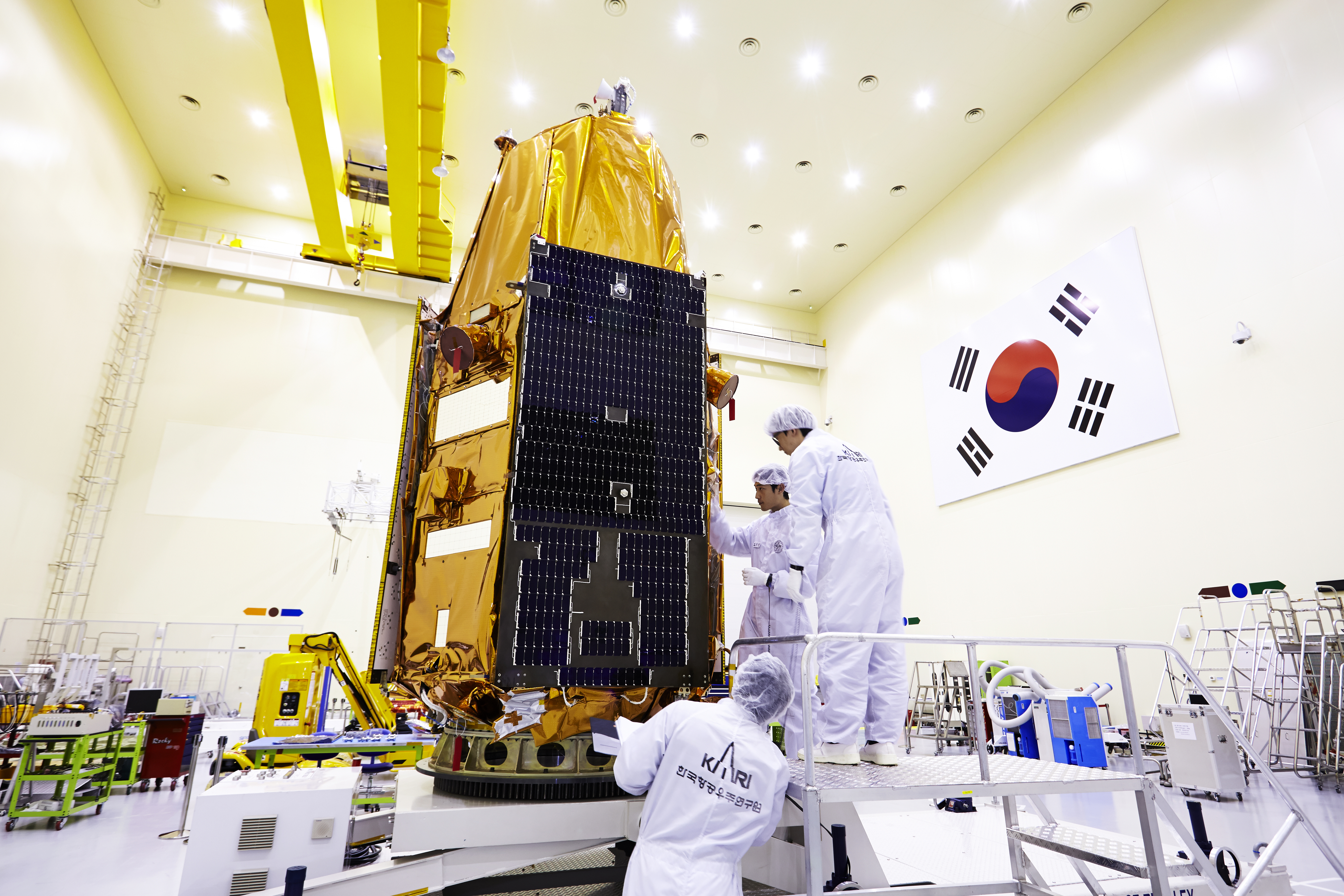
Arirang-3A earth observation satellite

==== Geostationary satellites ====
- GEO-KOMPSAT-2A
- GEO-KOMPSAT-2B
- GEO-KOMPSAT-3
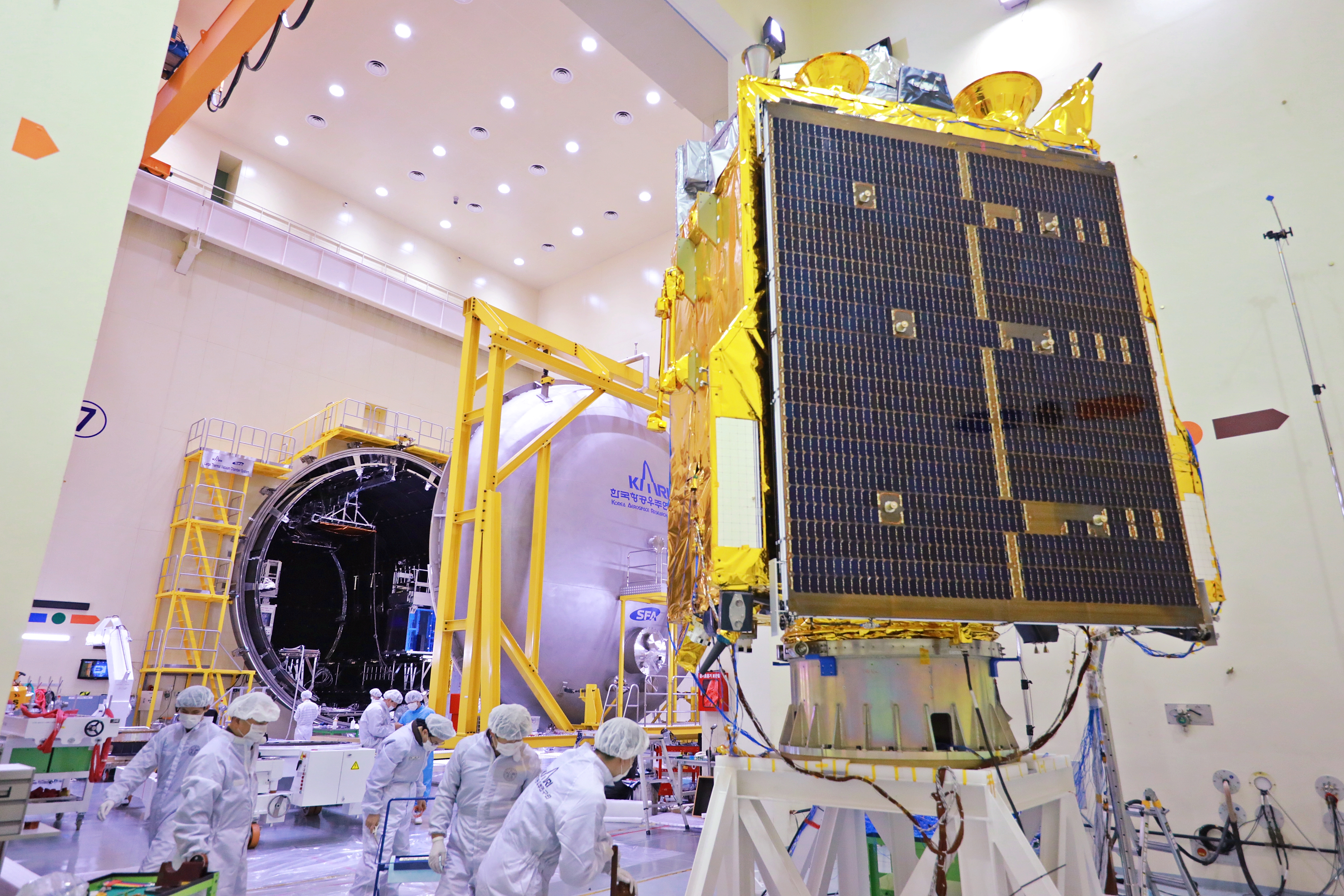
Chollian-2A geostationary satellite

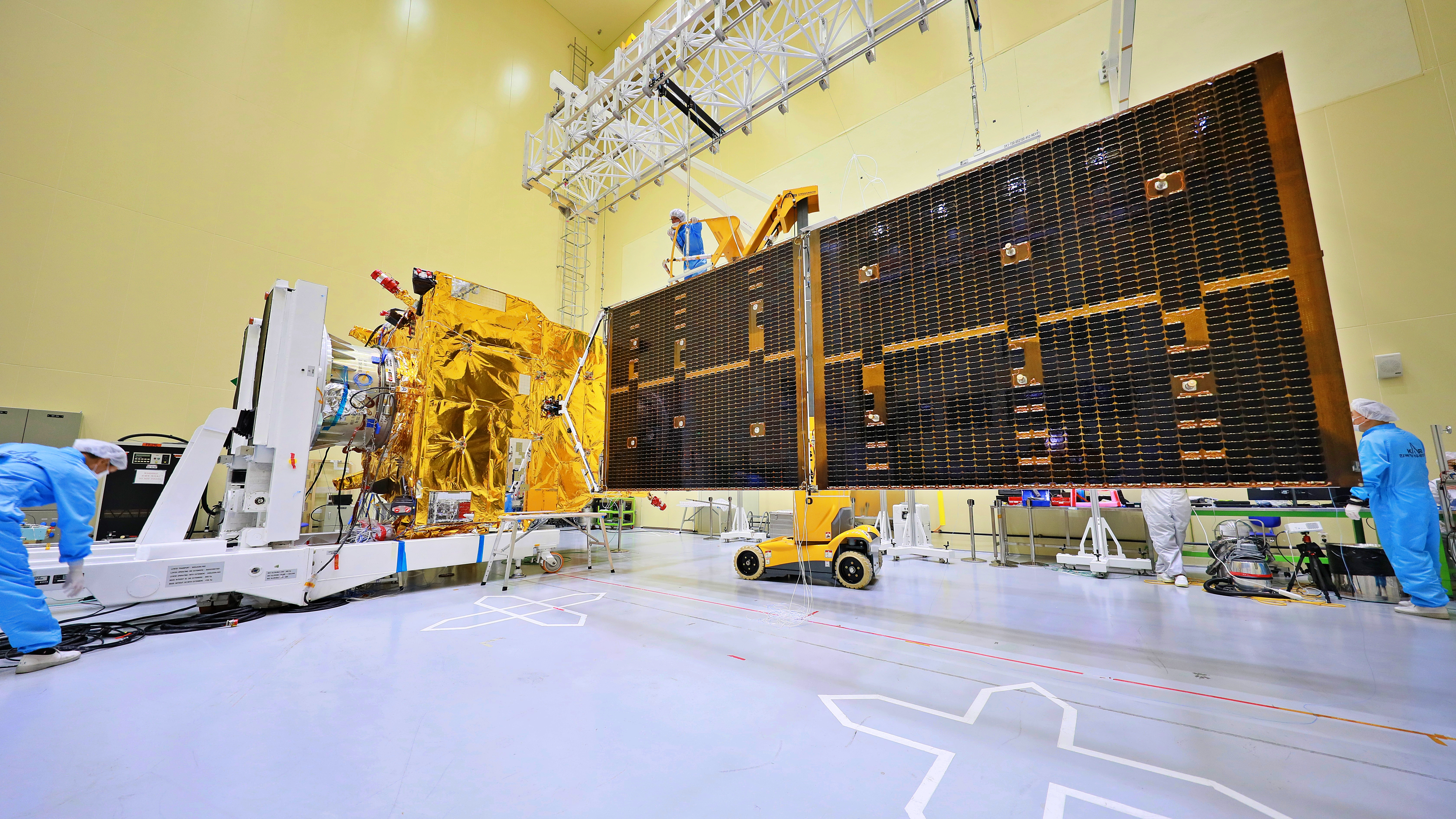
Chollian-2B geostationary satellite

==== Small satellites ====
- CAS500
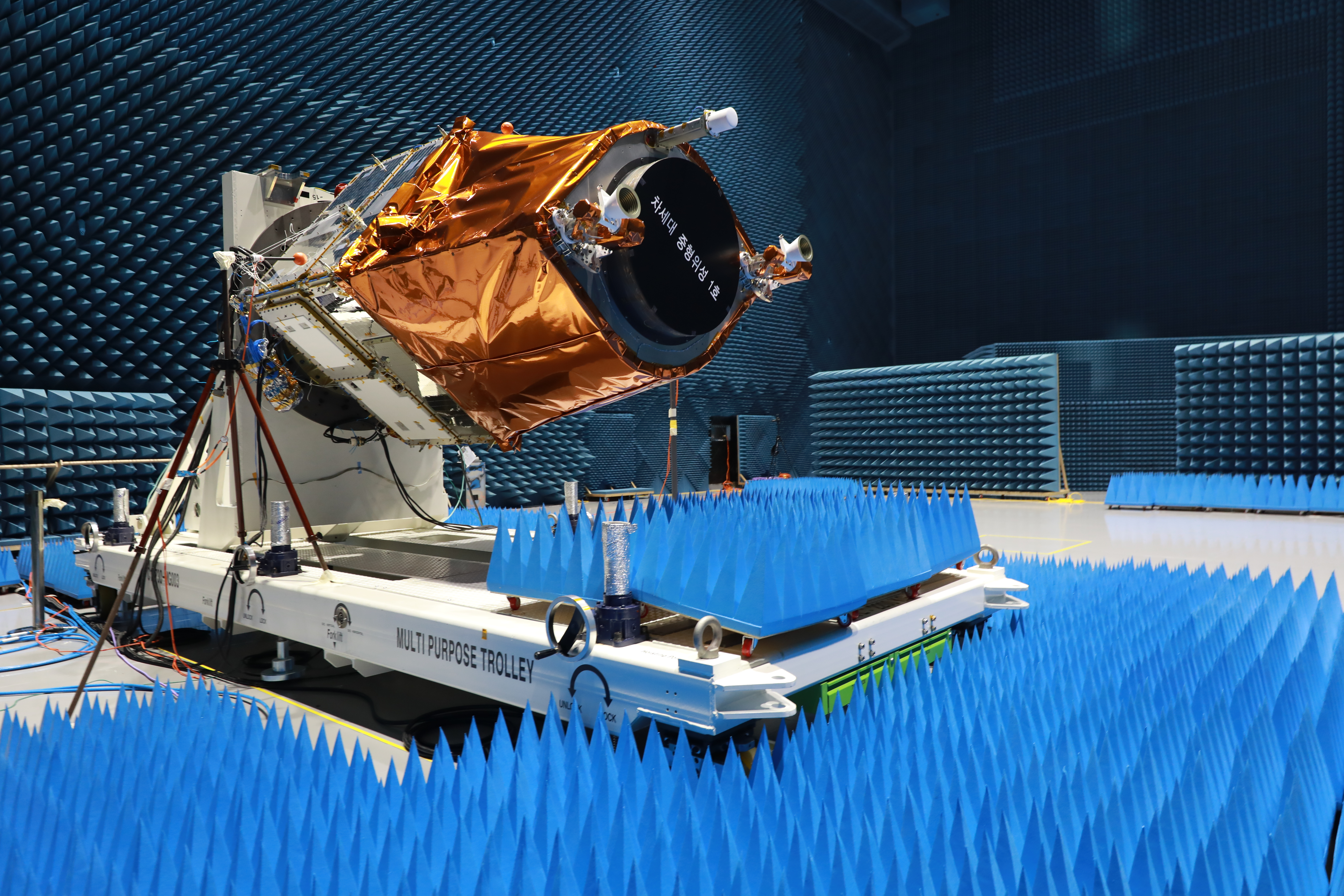
CAS500-1 earth observation satellite

=== Training systems ===
- T/TA-50 training system
- FA-50 training system
- KUH training system
- P-3CK simulator
- KF-16 simulator
- KT-1 simulator
- MUH simulator
- KSS-III (Jangbogo-III) submarine simulator
- VR device
- AI training system
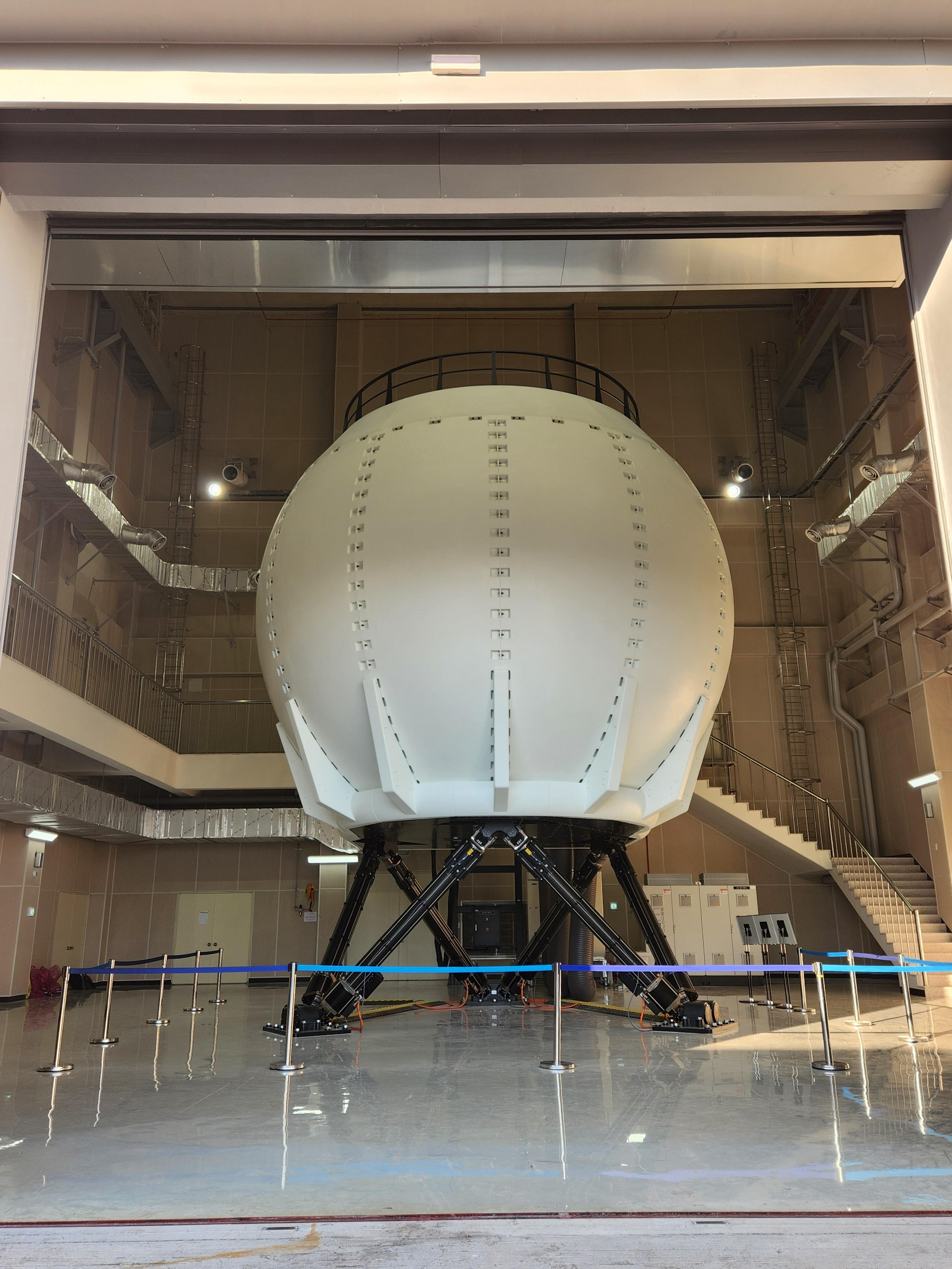
Solgae 631-class LCAC maritime simulator

=== Co-development ===
- Bell 427 helicopter, designed and manufactured by Bell Helicopter and Samsung Aerospace Industries.
- Bell 429 GlobalRanger helicopter, designed and manufactured by Bell Helicopter and Samsung Aerospace Industries.
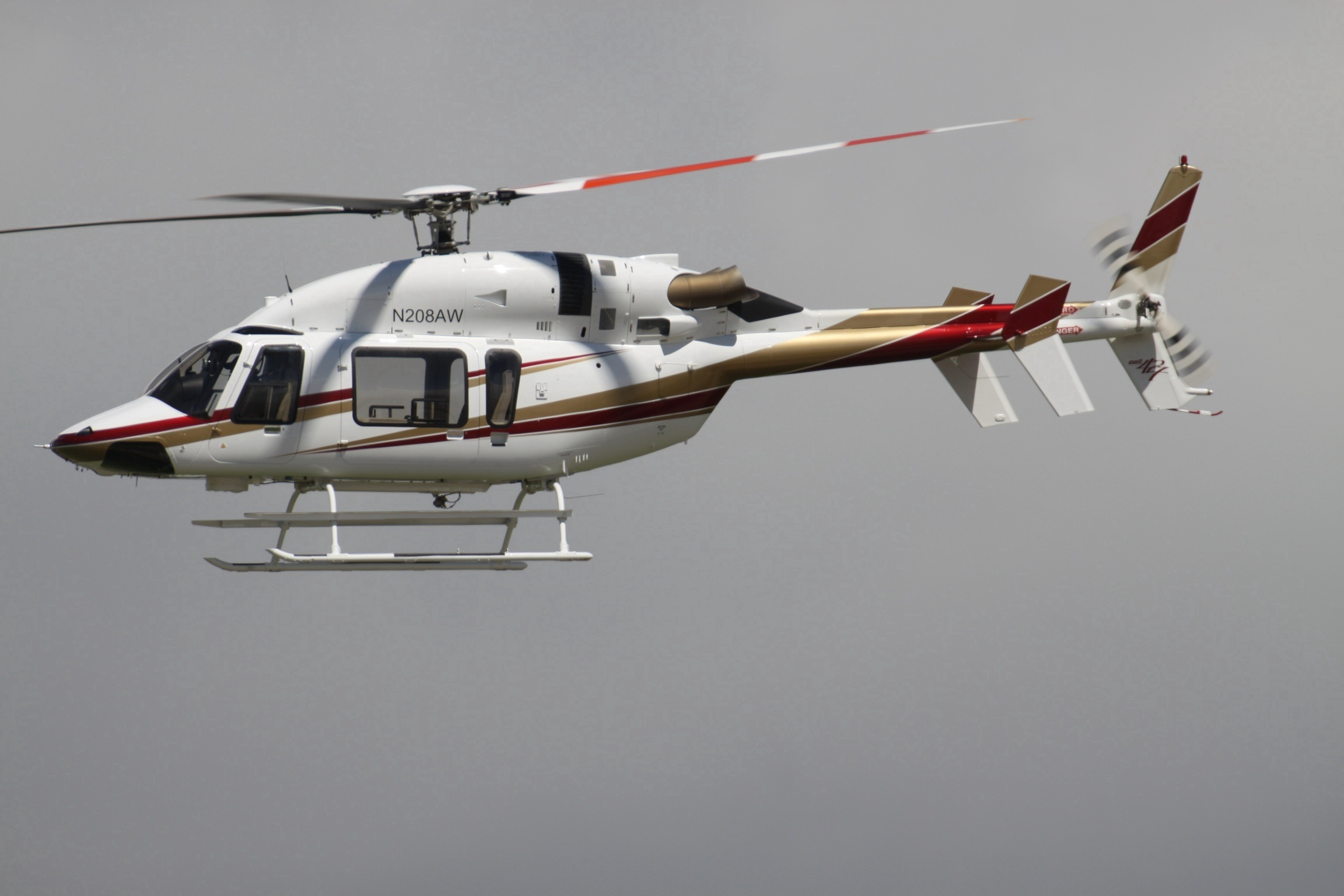
Bell 427 multipurpose utility helicopter

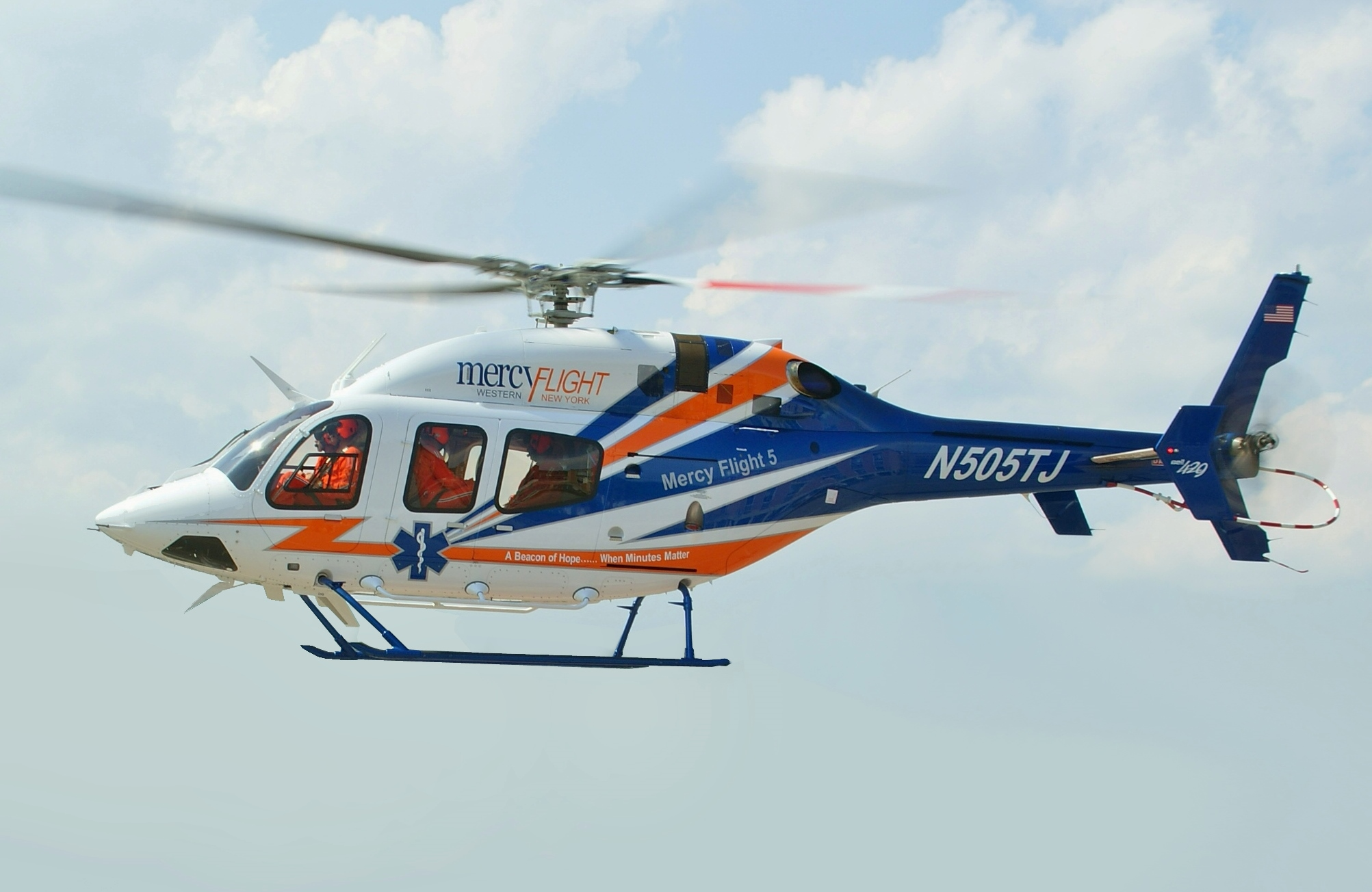
Bell 429 GlobalRanger multipurpose utility helicopter

=== Licensed production ===
- MBB/Kawasaki BK 117: Hyundai Space and Aircraft Company in 1989 assembled a BK-117.
- MBB Bo-105 KLH (1989): Daewoo Heavy Industries (aerospace division) license-produced combat version of CBS-5.
- KF-16, (1991): Samsung Aerospace produced 140 F-16 C/D Block 52 fighters under license from Lockheed Martin in the 1990s.

=== Upgrade and Modification ===
- Boeing 737 AEW&C
- Lockheed C-130 Hercules
- Lockheed P-3 Orion
- Westland Lynx

== Corporate governance ==
=== Ownership ===
Major shareholders as of July 2026
Shareholder	Country	Shares	Stake (%)
Export–Import Bank of Korea	South Korea	25,745,964	26.41%
Hanwha Aerospace	South Korea	12,127,000	12.44%
National Pension Service	South Korea	7,916,541	8.12%
Fidelity Management & Research	United States	6,596,484	6.77%
Korea Aerospace Industries Employee stock ownership	South Korea	1,075,404	1.10%

== See also ==
- KAI Aerospace Museum
- Defense industry of South Korea
