= South Korean space program =

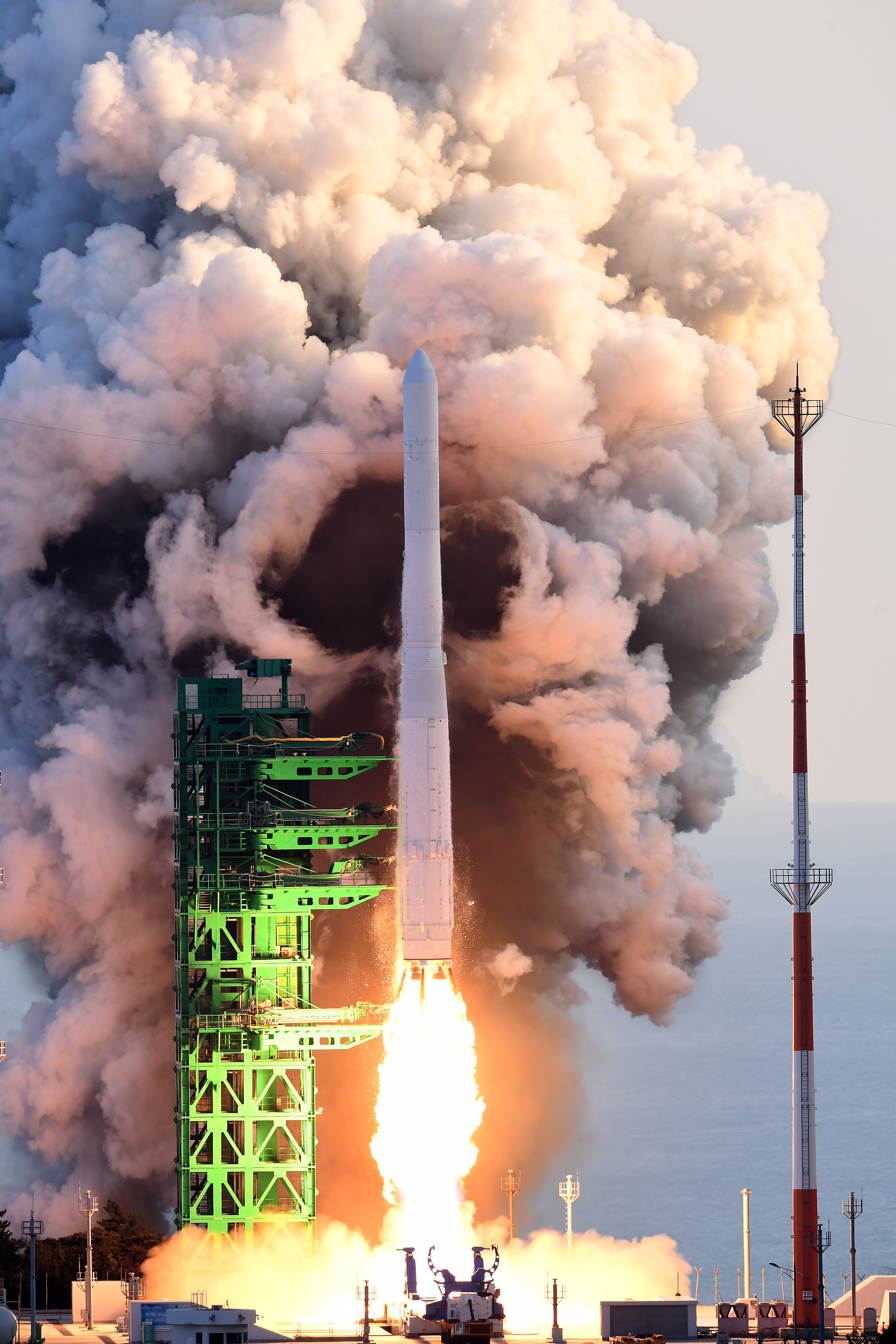
- First Launch of the Nuri
- First flight: 4 June 1993 (KARI KSR-1)

The South Korean space program began in earnest in the 1980s when research on space development began. Korea Aerospace Research Institute was established in October 1989, and the Korea AeroSpace Administration was established in May 2024.

The medium-lift launch vehicle Nuri is specialized for low-Earth orbit satellites weighing 1.9 t or less, and the KSLV-III, currently under development and scheduled for its first launch in 2030, is specialized for inserting large satellites into Earth orbit and launching lunar or Mars probes.

Based on the various data sent back by the lunar probe Danuri, which has been on a mission since 2022, a map of the moon was created. Danuri and the Electronics and Telecommunications Research Institute also exchanged messages through the space internet payload.

== History ==
The Space Science and Technology Development Plan, prepared by the Korea Astronomy and Space Science Institute under the contract of the Ministry of Science and Technology and made public in 1987, included the development and launch of an observation rocket by 1991, the introduction of a small satellite for scientific research into Earth's orbit by 1996, and the launch of a domestically produced commercial communications satellite in 2001.

=== Satellite ===
South Korea's space development began in earnest in the 1990s. In August 1992, the KITSAT-1 was launched from the Guiana Space Centre, followed by KITSAT-2 on September 26, 1993.

==== KITSAT ====
KITSAT-1 is a small satellite weighing 50 kg (110 lb) that was produced by the KAIST Satellite Research Center since 1989 with a total research budget of 6.94 billion won. It is equipped with high-resolution ground observation equipment and cutting-edge digital signal processing technology, and is loaded with broadcasting and communication equipment, ground observation equipment, and scientific experiment equipment. It was equipped with an amateur radio repeater, so amateur radio operators around the world could use it freely. In fact, a researcher working at the King Sejong Station in Antarctica used KITSAT-1 as an amateur radio. KITSAT-2 was independently designed and manufactured with a total investment of 2.8 billion won, and its main purpose was to photograph the Korean Peninsula and conduct various experiments.

KITSAT-3 was developed by the KAIST Satellite Center with 8 billion won in support from the Ministry of Science and Technology and other sources from April 1994, from design to parts manufacturing and assembly, and was launched in May 1999. The satellite was equipped with solar panels that could supply its own electricity and a charge-coupled device camera that could take pictures of objects on the ground as large as 15 meters.

==== Koreasat ====
The country felt the need for a practical communications satellite and launched the Koreasat 1 at Cape Canaveral Space Force Station in August 1995. The design life was 5 years, but it demonstrated performance for 12 years, with communications continuing until 2004.

==== KOMPSAT ====
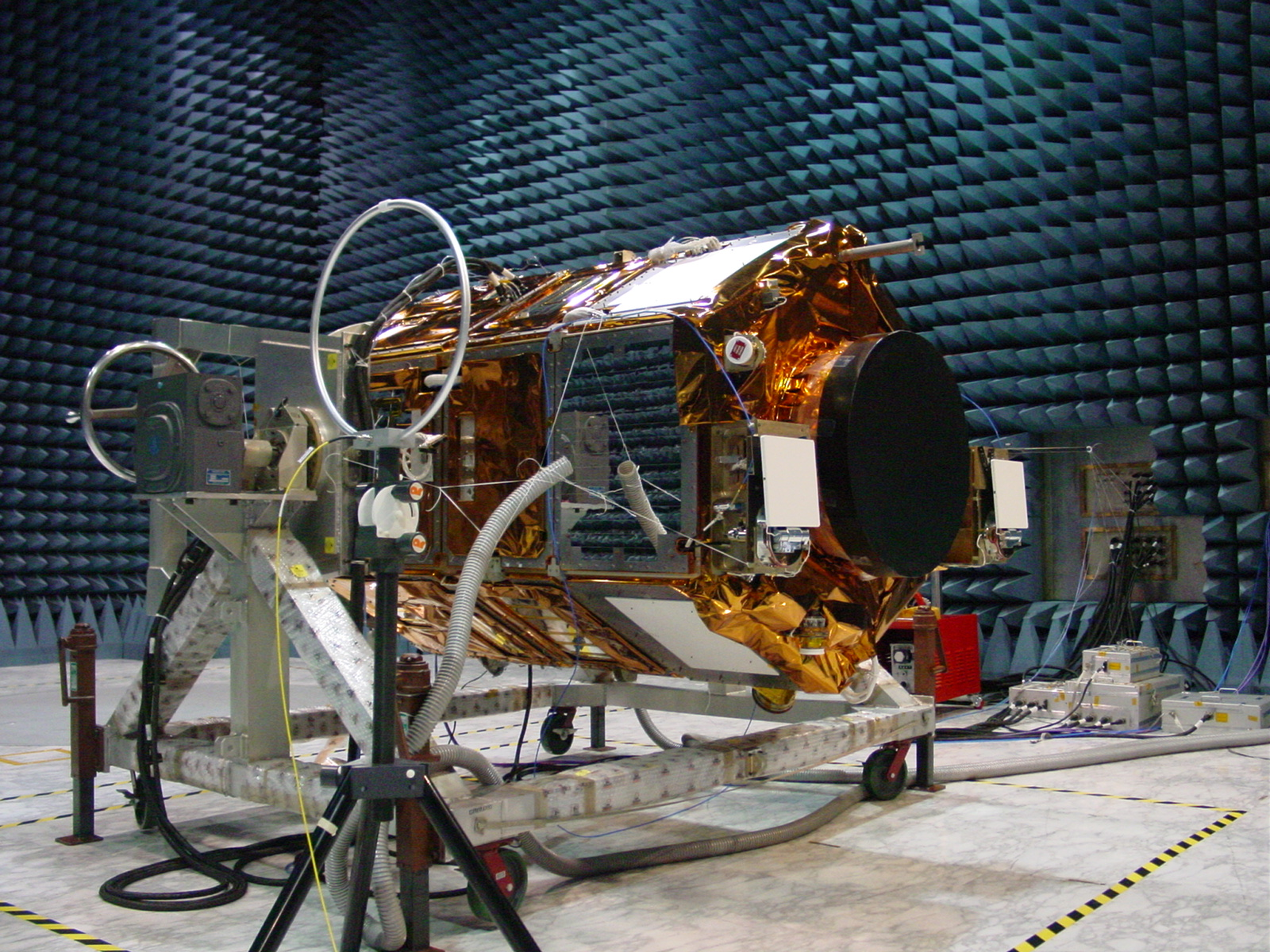
KOMPSAT-2

KOMPSAT-1, launched in December 1999, is a multipurpose satellite jointly developed by domestic researchers including the Korea Aerospace Research Institute and TRW of the United States with a total production cost of 165 billion won. The localization rate was approximately 80%. The main purpose of the launch was ocean observation and space science experiments. The data sent by this satellite were used by major domestic research institutes. In particular, the Aerospace Information Youth Corps and the Aerospace Research Institute received the names of 100,000 domestic youths and recorded them on three semiconductor chips to load into this satellite.

In 2006, Korea's ninth satellite KOMPSAT-2 and Koreasat 5 were launched.

==== Chollian ====
In June 2010, South Korea launched the world's first geostationary ocean observation satellite, Chollian-1. Floating at an altitude of over 36,000 km (22,000 mi) , it observed ocean changes around the Korean Peninsula eight times a day at one-hour intervals for ten years until its retirement through the ocean observation sensor GOCI. Since then, the Chollian series has been continuously launched, including Chollian-2A launched in December 2018 and Chollian-2B launched in 2020. Chollian-5 is planned to be launched.

==== Others ====
The KAIST Satellite Technology Research Center developed a small satellite, STSat-1, weighing 106 kg (234 lb), in October 1998 according to the domestic mid- to long-term plan for space development. The satellite was launched in September 2003. A total of 11.69 billion won was invested in the development. The KARI was in charge of general management, the KAIST Satellite Technology Research Center developed the satellite itself, and KAIST and the Korea Astronomy and Space Science Institute were in charge of developing the payload. It is equipped with a space telescope, the Far-ultraviolet IMaging Spectrograph (FIMS), a space physics package, and data collection equipment.

=== Rocket ===
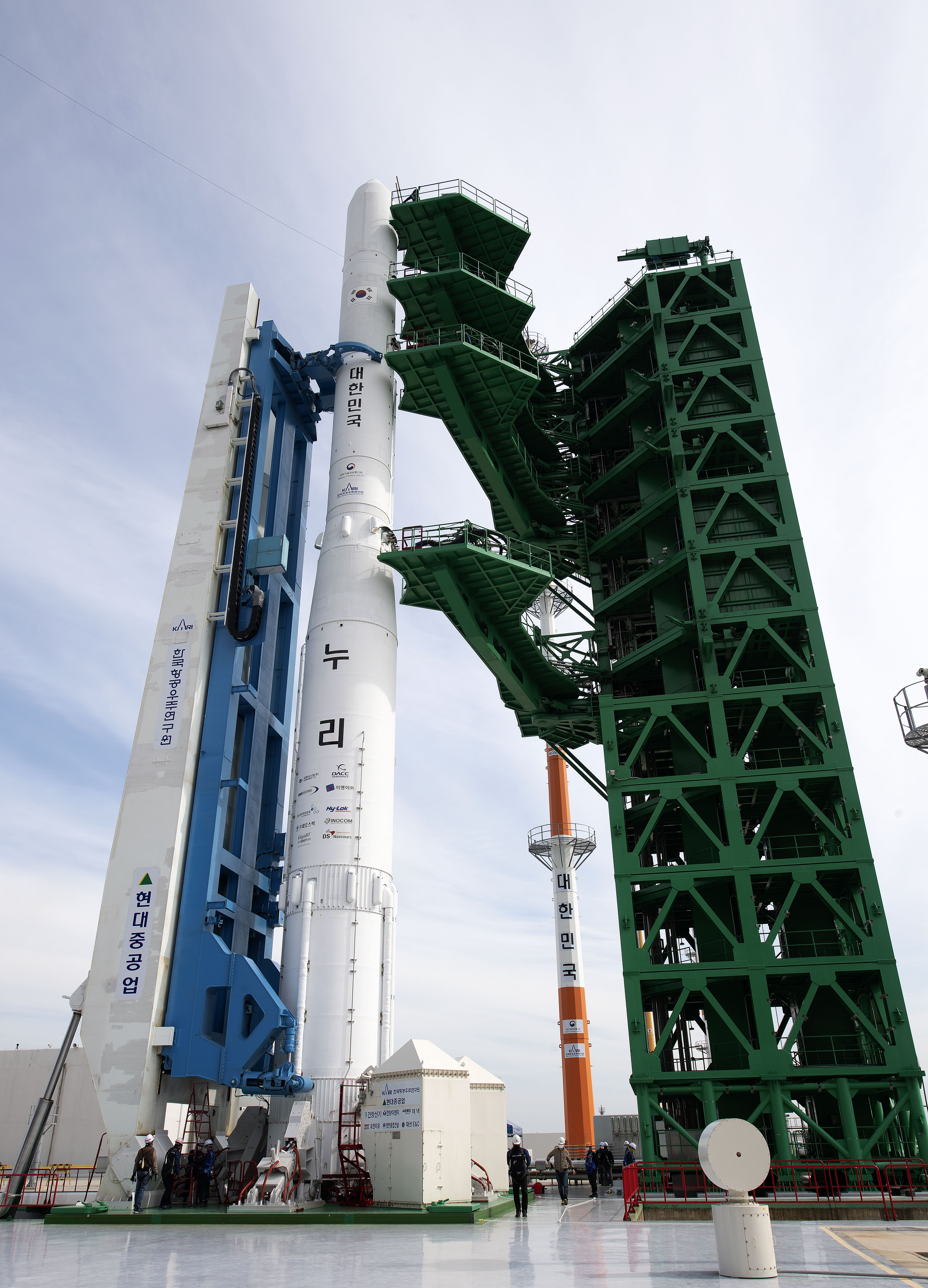
Nuri

In 1958, a rocket research organization was established at the Ministry of National Defense's Research Institute of Science, but full-scale plans for space rockets began in 1987 when the Astronomy and Space Science Institute, the predecessor of the Korea Astronomy and Space Science Institute, began basic research related to launch vehicle development. After the Korea Aerospace Research Institute was established in October 1989, efforts to secure Korean launch vehicle technology began in earnest. Since the early 1990s, Korea has focused on developing technologies in the fields of system integration, liquid propulsion engine design and production, engine testing, guidance control, and attitude control through scientific rocket research.

==== KSR ====
The first of the country's space launch vehicle was the KARI KSR-1, a single-stage solid-fuel propulsion scientific rocket developed under the leadership of Dr. Jang-soo Yoo of KARI from July 1990 and launched twice in 1993. Dr. Yoo later left KARI and founded AP Satellite. The company later produced a performance verification satellite that was aboard Nuri, which was launched in 2022.

From 1993 to 1998, 5.2 billion won was invested to develop the KSR-2, a medium-sized scientific rocket with a two-stage solid engine, with the goal of measuring the ionosphere and ozone layer 150 km above the Peninsula. It was first launched on July 9, 1997. However, the experimental observation failed, and the experimental observation was successful in the second launch on June 11 of the following year.

From 1997 to 2003, 78 billion won was invested over five years to develop the KARI KSR-3, a 13-ton liquid-propellant rocket, which was launched on November 28, 2002.

==== KSLV ====
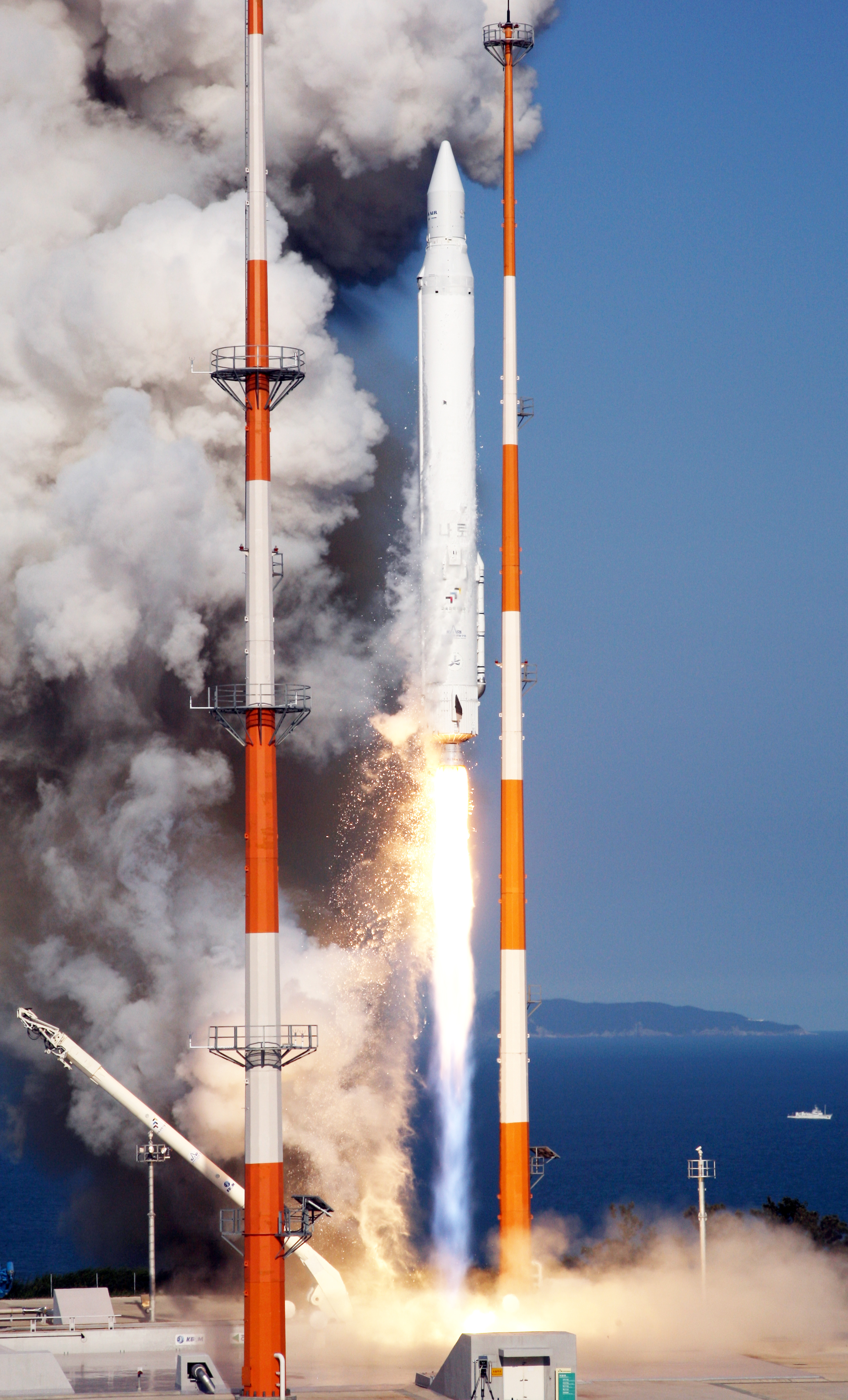
Naro-1

From August 2002 to April 2013, with a total budget of 502.5 billion won for 11 years, domestic researchers focused on developing Naro-1, the first space launch vehicle in the country capable of launching a 100-kg class small satellite into low Earth's orbit. About 150 private companies, including Korean Air, Hanwha, Korea Fiber, and Doowon Heavy Industries, participated in the Naro development project and were responsible for on-site technologies such as parts design and production, ground and launch facility production, and launch vehicle assembly.

The first rocket launched in 2021 was Nuri, which was designed, manufactured, tested, and launched using purely domestic technology, including the engine. It was developed over 12 years, starting in March 2010, with an investment of 1.9572 trillion won. The goal of the Nuri development project was to build a launch vehicle that could place a 1.5-ton practical satellite into low Earth orbit (600–800 km). The engines installed in units 1–3 are as follows. First stage: 4 liquid engines with a thrust of 75 tons (clustered); Second stage: 1 liquid engine with 75 tons of thrust; Third stage: 1 liquid engine with 7 tons of thrust.

The 7-ton engine and 75-ton engine KRE-075 were developed to operate in extreme environments of high pressure, extremely low temperature, and ultra-high temperature. The launch pad is located at the Naro Space Center in Goheung, South Jeolla Province, and was built by Hyundai Heavy Industries from 2016 to 2021. Nuri is scheduled for its fifth launch in October 2026.

As the need arose to develop the KSLV-III into a reusable launch vehicle, the KASA prepared a plan to improve the launch vehicle development project. The chief of KASA Yoon Young-bin explained the reason, saying, "We decided that it was time to discuss ways to simultaneously achieve the two tasks of launching a lunar lander on one's own and developing an economically feasible national space launch vehicle."

=== Lunar exploration ===
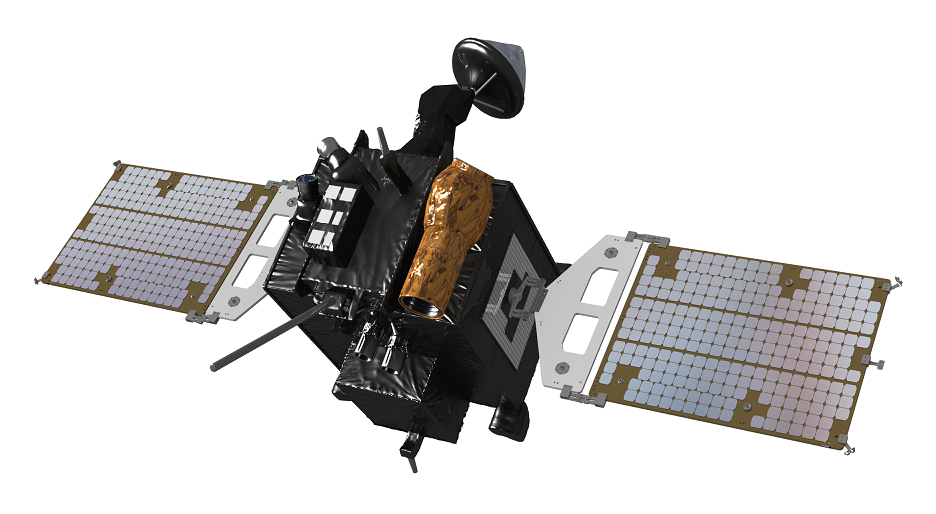
Rendered image of Danuri

Animation of Danuri around Moon

According to the detailed implementation roadmap for space development projects jointly established by nine ministries including the Ministry of Science and ICT in 2007, a lunar orbiter is to be developed by 2020 and a lunar lander by 2025. The plan established in 2011 set the development of the orbiter until 2023, three years later than originally planned, and the lander until 2025. The Third Basic Plan for Space Development Promotion, established in February 2018, states that the goal is to launch a orbiter in 2020, and a lander and rover in 2030.

The Korean Lunar Exploration Program is a lunar exploration program that develops lunar orbiter and lander, and is led by the KARI. In August 2022, Danuri was launched with the primary goal of lunar observation, and is equipped with a high-resolution camera from KARI, a wide-field polarimetric camera from the KASI, a magnetic field meter from Kyung Hee University, a gamma-ray spectrometer from the Korea Institute of Geoscience and Mineral Resources, and a space internet from the Electronics and Telecommunications Research Institute. As of August 2023, one year after its launch, Danuri's total flight distance was 38.01 million km, and it sent 2,576 high-resolution photos of the moon to Earth. Currently, Danuri is carrying out scientific and technological missions such as exploring lunar landing sites, conducting lunar scientific research, and verifying space internet technology.

Based on the various data sent back by Danuri, which has been on a mission since 2022, a map of the moon were created. Danuri and the Electronics and Telecommunications Research Institute also exchanged messages through the space internet payload. The lander and rover are scheduled to be launched in 2032 using the KSLV-III rocket. The preliminary design of the lunar lander is scheduled to be completed by 2027, and the detailed design is scheduled to be completed by 2029, after which full-scale production and testing will begin.

=== Satellite navigation ===
The government is developing the Korean Positioning System (KPS) from 2022 with the goal of providing ultra-precision PNT (position, navigation, and timing) information to enhance the stability of transportation and communication infrastructure operations and foster new industries. The development project will cost 3.723 trillion won by 2035. A total of eight satellites, including five inclined orbit satellites and three geostationary orbit satellites for navigation signal broadcasting to establish KPS, are scheduled to be launched by 2035, with the first satellite scheduled to be launched in 2027.

=== Budget ===
South Korea's annual space budget
Year	Budget
2011	$232M
2012	$221M
2013	$349M
2014	$532M
2016	$689M
2019	$476M
2020	$722M
2022	$600M
2025	$726M

The average annual space budget of the Moon Jae-in government from 2018 to 2021 is a total of $2.66 billion, with an average annual investment of $649 million, while the average annual space budget of the Park Geun-hye government from 2013 to 2017 is a total of $2.88 billion, with an average annual investment of $561 million.

In March 2024, President Yoon Suk Yeol announced that the government-private matching space fund established in 2023 would be more than doubled by 2027, and that he would target a space budget of 1.5 trillion won by 2027.

== Development ==
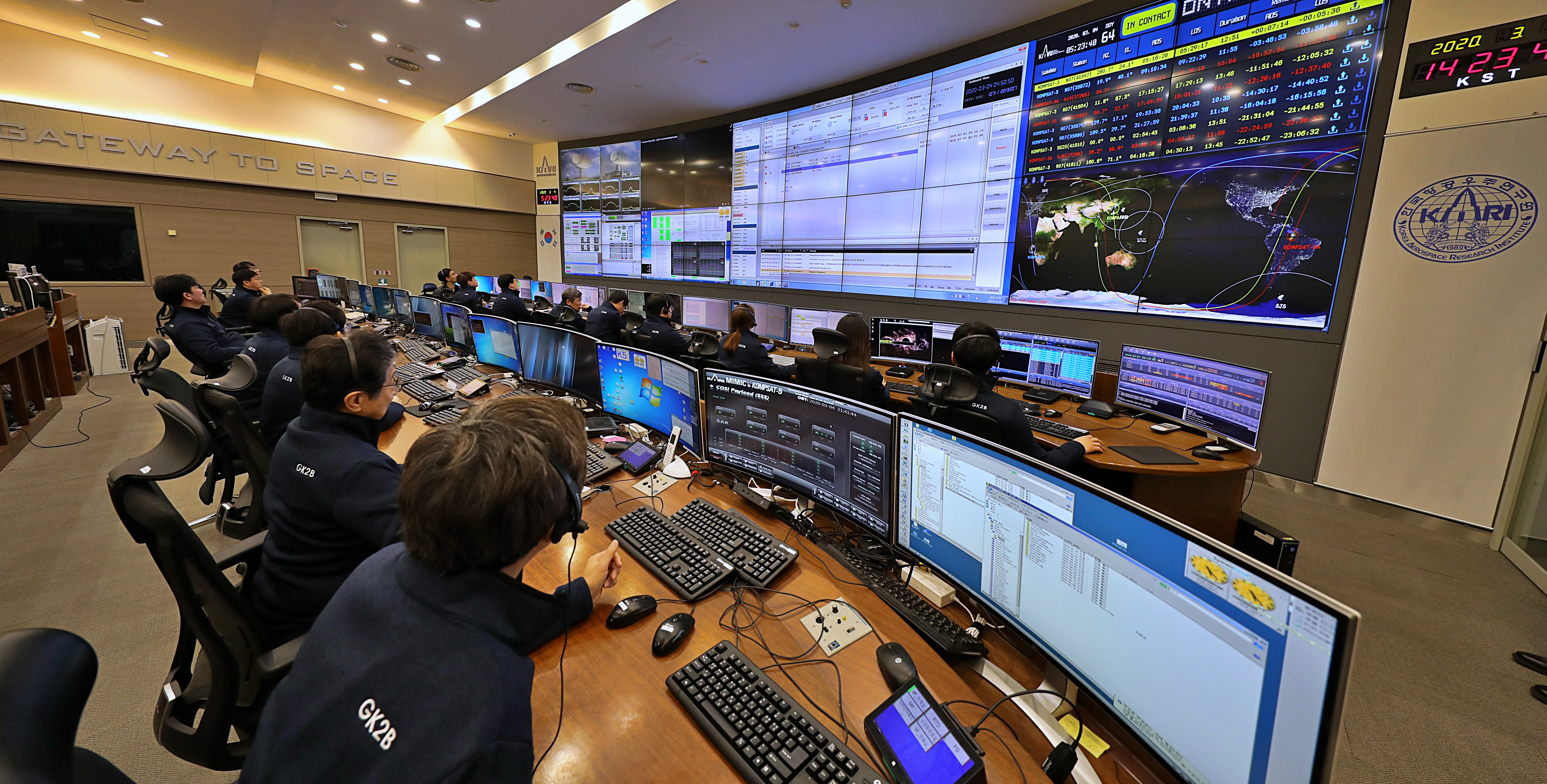
KARI's Satellite Control Center

Currently, the largest aerospace industry cluster in South Korea, the National Aerospace Industrial Complex, is being developed in two districts: Sacheon District in Jinju District, with the goal of completion in June 2025. Its primary role is to bring together all the infrastructure needed for research, manufacturing, and commercialization.

In 1989, KARI was established with about 30 employees, and was designated as a space development specialized organization under the Space Development Promotion Act in 2016. The number of researchers in 2022 is approximately 1,100. Major research institutes and companies in South Korea are as follows:

Logo	Company	Description
	Hanwha Aerospace	Rocket engine
	LIG Defense & Aerospace	Rockets and arms manufacturing
	Perigee Aerospace	Rocket manufacturing startup
	Hyundai Rotem	Reusable launch vehicle
	Korea AeroSpace Administration	Governmental organisation
	Korea Aerospace Industries	Helicopters, fixed-wing aircraft, final assembly of the rocket
	HD Hyundai Heavy Industries	Rocket launch pad
	Satrec Initiative	Satellite manufacturing

== Private companies ==
In March 2023, South Korean space startup Innospace launched its test launch vehicle, HANBIT-TLV. It is the first civilian-made space rocket. The company launched their first attempt to reach orbit with a two-stage rocket, named HANBIT-NANO, in 2025. The first launch was unsuccessful.

Perigee Aerospace, a startup founded by KAIST students, has launched a test launch vehicle called Blue Whale 0.1 four times since 2021, and a small two-stage launch vehicle called Blue Whale 1 is under development, aimed at transporting small satellites to low Earth orbit.

Kairospace developed CubeSat deployers used on the Nuri (KSLV-II) launch vehicle, participated in the development of the PolCam instrument aboard Danuri, and built the KSAT3U CubeSat, launched on Nuri's third flight on 25 May 2023.

== See also ==
- Yi So-yeon
- Korea Aerospace University
- National Aerospace Industrial Complex
- Korean Lunar Exploration Program
- Naro Space Center
- KSLV-III
