= Korean Positioning System =

Planned South Korean navigational system

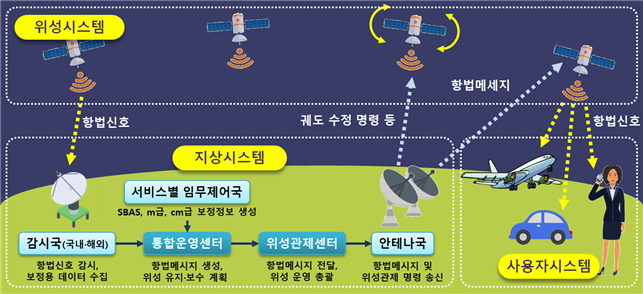
- Country/ies of origin: South Korea
- Status: Planned
- Coverage: Regional

Other details
- Cost: KRW 3.72 trillion

The Korean Positioning System (KPS; Korean: 한국형 위성 항법시스템) is a regional satellite navigation system currently under development by the South Korean government. It will consist of a total of eight satellites, the first of which is scheduled to be launched in 2027. Full operational capability is expected in 2035. KPS will provide an independent positioning, navigation, and timing (PNT) service in the Asia-Oceania region and can also be compatible with other global navigation satellite systems (GNSS).

== History ==
South Korean government has promoted the KPS plan with the goal of providing ultra-precision PNT (position, navigation, and timing) information to areas surrounding the Korean Peninsula, thereby increasing the stability of transportation and communication infrastructure operation and fostering new industries. The plan is to build an independent satellite navigation system that will be used across the economy and society, including transportation and communications, finance, national defense, agriculture, and disaster response. The government expects that once the KPS is completed, the accuracy of location information around the peninsula will greatly increase.

In June 2021, the 19th National Space Committee hosted by the Ministry of Science and ICT deliberated and confirmed the 3rd Amendment to the Basic Plan for Space Development Promotion containing the KPS promotion plan. Work began on the project in 2021 with an initial USD 3.3 billion budget. The KPS project began in earnest in 2022, and is a large-scale national project with an investment of 3.7234 trillion won by 2035. In October 2024, the Korea Aerospace Research Institute and the Korea AeroSpace Administration decided to partially delay the satellite development plan at the KPS Preliminary Design Review. The project is being developed with US and EU assistance. In March the United States and the Republic of Korea held their first technical working group. Work is being carried out through Thales Alenia Space and the project was officially certified by the Korean authorities in 2024.

== Satellites ==
KARI and KASA plan to launch a total of eight satellites, including five inclined orbit satellites for navigation signal broadcasting and three geostationary orbit satellites, to establish KPS by 2035. One of the eight satellites that will form KPS is scheduled to be launched into space in 2027.

== See also ==
- South Korean space program
