= Tropospheric Emissions: Monitoring of Pollution =

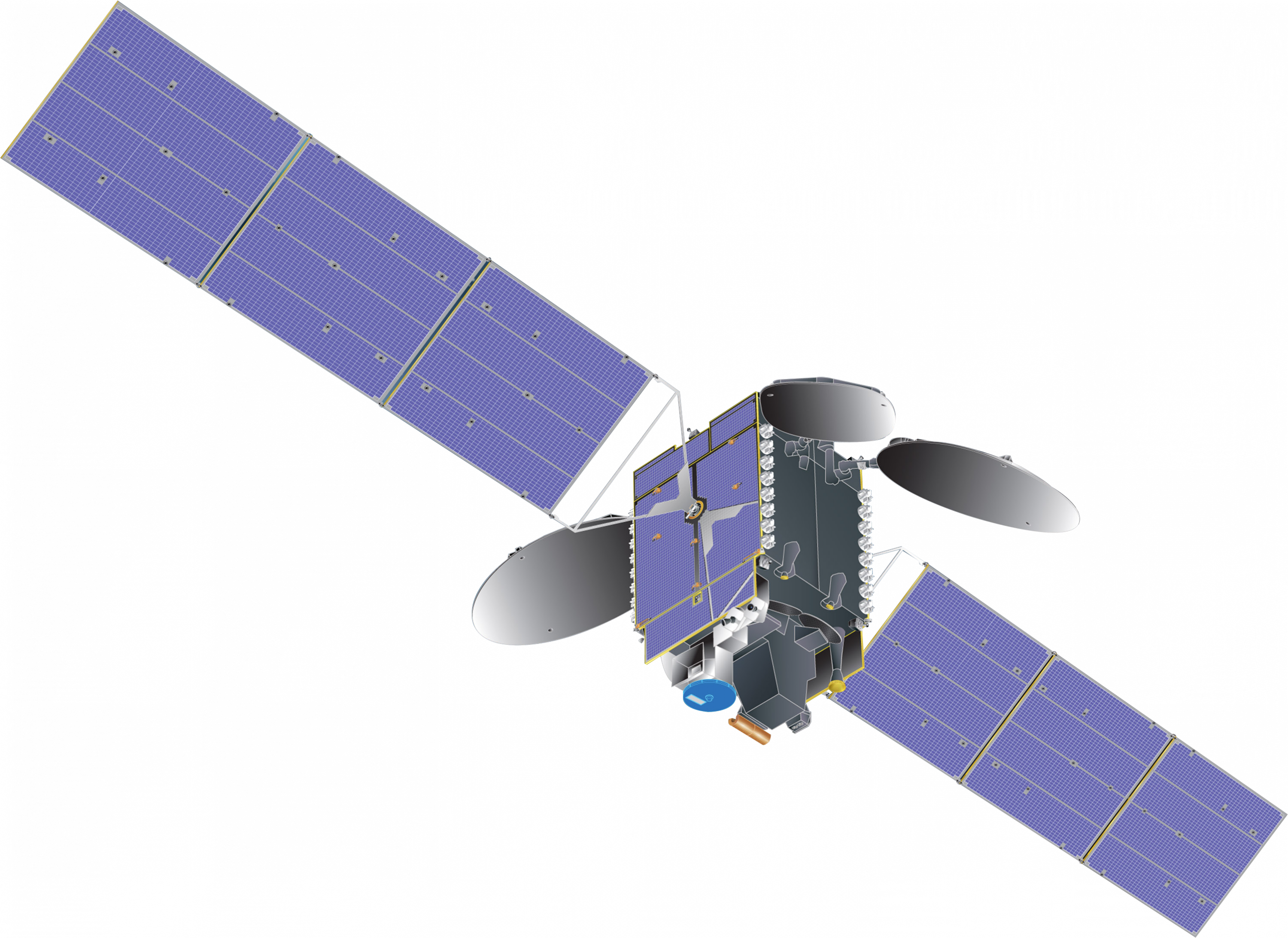
- TEMPO attached to a communications satellite.
- Operator: NASA
- Manufacturer: Ball Aerospace
- Instrument type: UV/Vis spectrometer
- Function: Atmospheric chemistry and pollution monitoring
- Began operations: 2023 (planned)
- Website: tempo.si.edu

Properties
- Resolution: 0.6 nm
- Spectral band: 290–740 nm (UV, Vis)

Host spacecraft
- Spacecraft: Intelsat 40e
- Operator: Intelsat
- Launch date: 7 April 2023, 4:30:00 UTC
- Rocket: Falcon 9 Block 5 B1076.4
- Launch site: Cape Canaveral, SLC-40
- Orbit: Geostationary, 91° W

Tropospheric Emissions: Monitoring of Pollution (TEMPO) is a space-based spectrometer designed to measure air pollution across greater North America at a high resolution and on an hourly basis. The ultraviolet–visible spectrometer provides hourly data on ozone, nitrogen dioxide, and formaldehyde in the atmosphere.

TEMPO is a hosted payload on a commercial geostationary communication satellite with a constant view of North America. TEMPO's spectrometer measures reflected sunlight from the Earth's atmosphere and separates it into 2,000 component wavelengths. It will scan North America from the Pacific Ocean to the Atlantic Ocean and from the Alberta oil sands to Mexico City. TEMPO will form part of a geostationary constellation of pollution-monitoring assets, along with the Sentinel-4 from ESA and Geostationary Environment Monitoring Spectrometer (GEMS) from South Korea's KARI.

On 3 February 2020, Intelsat announced that the Intelsat 40e satellite will host TEMPO. Maxar Technologies, the builder of the satellite, is responsible for payload integration. The launch occurred on 7 April 2023.

== Earth Venture-Instrument program ==
TEMPO, which is a collaboration between NASA and the Smithsonian Astrophysical Observatory, is NASA's first Earth Venture-Instrument (EVI) mission. The EVI program is an element within the Earth System Science Pathfinder (ESSP) program office, which is under NASA's Science Mission Directorate Earth Science Division (SMD/ESD). EVI's are a series of innovative "science-driven, competitively selected, low cost missions". The series of "Venture Class" missions were recommended in the 2007 publication Earth Science and Applications from Space: National Imperatives for the Next Decade and Beyond. "[I]nnovative research and application missions that might address any area of Earth science" are selected through frequent "openly-competed solicitations".

Earth Venture missions are "small-sized competitively selected orbital missions and instrument missions of opportunity" and include NASA-ISRO Synthetic Aperture Radar (NISAR), Surface Water and Ocean Topography (SWOT), ICESat-2, SAGE III on ISS, Gravity Recovery and Climate Experiment Follow On (GRACE-FO), Cyclone Global Navigation Satellite System (CYGNSS), Ecosystem Spaceborne Thermal Radiometer Experiment on Space Station (ECOSTRESS), and the Global Ecosystem Dynamics Investigation lidar (GEDI).
