= Korea AeroSpace Administration =

South Korean government agency

- 우주항공청
- Formation: 27 May 2024; 2 years ago
- Type: Governmental organisation
- Headquarters: Sacheon, South Korea
- Location: 537 Haeansaneop-ro, Sanam-myeon, Sacheon, Gyeongsangnam-do, South Korea
- Coordinates: 35.0520049°N 128.0413561°E
- Administrator: Oh Tae-seok
- Deputy Administrator: Ro Kyung-won
- Main organ: Ministry of Science and ICT
- Budget: ₩1.12 trillion (US$749 million) (FY2026)
- Staff: 293
- Website: www.kasa.go.kr/eng/index.do

Korean name
- Hangul: 우주항공청
- Hanja: 宇宙航空廳
- RR: Uju hanggongcheong
- MR: Uju hanggongch'ŏng

The Korea AeroSpace Administration (KASA; Korean: 우주항공청) is a Korean government-funded space and Aeronautics agency. Established under the Ministry of Science and ICT, KASA oversees the Korea Aerospace Research Institute and Korea Astronomy and Space Science Institute. Its headquarters is located in Sacheon, South Gyeongsang Province.

== History ==
KASA was established on 27 May 2024 as part of a campaign promise made by President Yoon Suk Yeol to reform national politics, including shifting space exploration to the private sector. Seen as the domestic version of NASA, KASA aims to become one of the top five leading space agencies through developing the KSLV-III rocket and creating and landing homegrown spacecraft on the Moon by 2032 and Mars by 2045.

The administration was launched as a temporary headquarters by remodeling the Aaron Aviation Ship Industry building located in Sanam-myeon, Sacheon. On February 25, 2025, the National Space Committee selected the Sacheon District of the National Aerospace Industrial Complex as the final site for the new headquarters, with the goal of moving into the new headquarters by 2030.

== Program ==
=== Lunar exploration ===
On October 30, 2024, KASA and KARI signed an agreement for the second phase of the lunar exploration project, lunar lander development, and announced that it would begin the project in earnest. The main content is to invest approximately 530 billion won over 10 years to independently develop a lunar lander to be sent to the moon with the goal of landing on the moon in 2032.

=== KSLV-III ===
In 2022, KSLV-III, which is under development with a budget of 2.132 trillion won and aims to launch a Korean lunar lander in 2032 and achieve a performance more than three times that of Nuri, passed the preliminary feasibility study. KSLV-III is being developed with the goal of its first launch in 2030.

=== KPS ===
The Korean Positioning System (KPS; Korean: 한국형 위성 항법시스템) is a regional satellite navigation system currently under development by the South Korean government. It will consist of a total of eight satellites, the first of which is scheduled to be launched in 2027. Full operational capability is expected in 2035. KPS will provide an independent positioning, navigation, and timing (PNT) service in the Asia-Oceania region and can also be compatible with other global navigation satellite systems (GNSS).

== International cooperation ==
=== United States ===
In September 2024, the Administrator Yoon Young-bin held a bilateral meeting with NASA Administrator Bill Nelson at NASA Headquarters and signed a joint statement for cooperation in space and aeronautics activities.

The two administration agreed to strengthen cooperation in the fields of lunar and deep space exploration centered around the Artemis Program, and to discover innovative projects with high potential in fields such as space life science, lunar surface science, joint use of deep space antennas, and heliophysics, and to cooperate in technological exchanges and human resource development, as well as space sustainability such as space debris reduction and space traffic management. They signed an agreement on the exploration of the fourth Lagrangian point (L4), the main contents of which are to seek ways to improve space radiation safety and the efficiency of space exploration activities, and to jointly conduct research on data transmission, optical communication, and use of repeaters at L4.

=== Germany ===
Yoon met with the German Aerospace Center and signed an interagency agreement for cooperation in the areas of L4 heliosphere observations, satellite navigation, space safety, space exploration and Earth observation.

== Structure ==
The role of KASA is largely divided into four:

- Establishing national aerospace policy
- Conducting research and development
- Training human resources, promoting industry
- International cooperation

=== Administrator ===
No.	Portrait	Name	Term of office		
No.	Portrait	Name	Took office	Left office	Time in office
1		Yoon Young-bin 윤영빈	27 May 2024	Incumbent	2 years, 92 days

== See also ==
- Danuri
- South Korean space program
