= Waryongsan =

Mountain in South Gyeongsang, South Korea

Highest point
- Elevation: 799 m (2,621 ft)
- Coordinates: 34°59′13″N 128°06′23″E

Geography
- Location: Sacheon, South Korea

Waryongsan is a mountain of South Gyeongsang Province, southeastern South Korea. It has an elevation of 799 metres.

== See also ==
- List of mountains of Korea
