= Free space (disambiguation) =

Free space may refer to:

- A perfect vacuum, that is a space free of all matter
- In electrical engineering, free space means air (as opposed to a material, transmission line, fiber-optic cable, etc.):
  - Free-space optical communication is communication by shining light through air
  - Free-space path loss, the spreading-out of light as it travels through 3D space
  - Free-space display is a 3D display projected into the air, often with the help of mist
- Autonomous free space, community centers in which non-authoritarians enact principles of mutual aid
- Social centre the free shared space in a community
- Descent: FreeSpace – The Great War, a space combat simulation computer game
- The area of a data storage device (for example, a computer disk drive) that is still available for more data storage
- Motion planning § Free space, the subset of a configuration space where a robot will not collide with obstacles

== See also ==
- Deep Space (disambiguation)
