= Air pollution in South Korea =

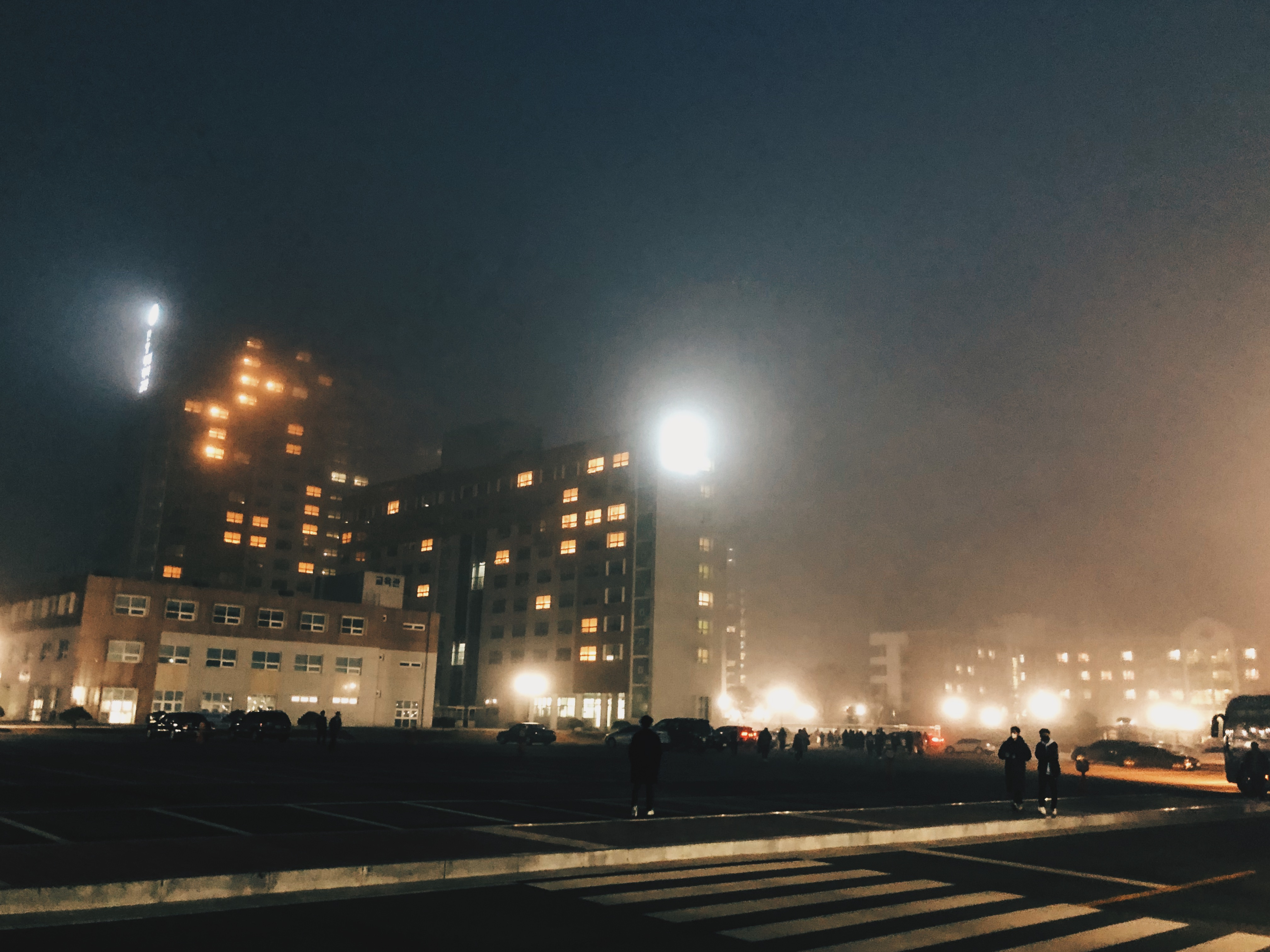
Pollution in South Korea is visible on some nights

Air pollution in South Korea is an increasing threat to people and the environment. The air pollution comes from many sources, both domestic and international. Many forms of pollution have increased in South Korea since its rapid industrialization, especially in Seoul and other cities. According to the U.S. National Aeronautics and Space Administration (NASA), Seoul is one of the world's cities with the worst air pollution. From 2009 and 2013, the city's mean PM_{10} were higher than in many of the largest metropolitan cities in the world such as: Los Angeles, Tokyo, Paris, and London. This has resulted in health and environmental problems. Koreans buy masks and air purifiers to breathe cleaner air, and are working to reduce the country's emissions.

== Overview ==
South Korea has the worst air quality of the 35 richest countries in the world that are part of the OECD. According to the 2019 World Air Quality Report AirVisual, South Korea's annual average ultrafine dust concentration in 2018 was 24.9μg/m^{3}, which was the worst among OECD member countries.

Pollution in South Korea increased after World War II. In 1960, Korea was a developing country with a small manufacturing sector and was heavily dependent on foreign aid. The society of South Korea began a massive shift from an agrarian to industrial economy, which was only accelerated by the Korean War. In the aftermath of the war, the United States funneled significant aid to South Korea under the auspices of the United Nations Korea Reconstruction Agency (UNKRA). Once a fledgling industrial nation, South Korea's economy grew 10% each year through the 1980s and 1990s. Today, South Korea is a manufacturing and export powerhouse, as of 2015 it was the world's 11th largest gross domestic producer, but this has been driven by coal-fired power generation and high vehicle emissions.

From 2014 to 2016 there was a 1,139 million dollar cut in the South Korean Air Pollution Control Industry. However, since then, the Korean Ministry of Environment has regulated 11 air pollutants and 32 other air substances that are categorized as hazardous. Korea also plans to close 10 of their 61 running coal power plants by 2025.

With this rapid growth South Korea itself became a major source of air pollution in the country, including from diesel vehicles, construction equipment, heating and air conditioning, and power plants.

In a 2018 survey of the Korean Ministry of Environment, 97% of respondents noted that air pollution was causing physical or psychological pain. In response, the South Korean government responded to the public by declaring a social disaster to release emergency funding. During the COVID-19 pandemic, there was a 27% decrease in the concentration of air pollutants. However, in March 2021, South Korea experienced the worst yellow dust storm in ten years.

== Causes ==
=== China ===
Multiple studies show that most of South Korea's pollution comes from China because of the spread of fine dust produced by China's factories and coal-fired power plants. China causes 30 to 50 percent of the PM_{2.5} at South Korea on days of average air quality, but 60 to 80 percent on days with the worst air quality.

China is particularly blamed when slow air currents in colder months create smog-like conditions. However, many experts say that Korea's heavy reliance on coal-fired power plants and diesel fuel is also a major part of the problem. Fine dust particles from China together with domestic air pollutants contribute to the surge in the concentration of air pollutants in the Korean air. China's growing economic activity has allowed them to burn a yearly average of 4 billion tons of coal, which in turn has contributed up to 50% of Korea's PM_{2.5} particles. This gets worse with slow air currents in colder months, the National Institute of Environmental Research said in a report in 2016. During the colder months, rumors and complaints about China grow. Many people in South Korea suffer from mental distress and are at risk of respiratory problems because of the fine dust that blows into South Korea from the western deserts of China. Long range transportation of harmful particles from southwestern China, specifically Shanghai was found to be the culprit. This statistic is only expected to worsen with a predicted increase in China's number of power plants fueled by coal.

=== Traffic ===
In modern South Korea, fossil fuel combustion is the biggest contributor to air pollution. Korea has minimal fossil fuel resources and imports all but 1% of its coal supplies. The country relies heavily on fossil energy, due to its growing economy and need for energy sources, with oil accounting for 38% of the primary energy supply, coal 29% and gas 15%.

Traffic, factories and power plants all contribute to pollution. Conventional power plants combust fossil fuels to produce energy and release hazardous gases such as oxides and nitrogen, carbon monoxide, particulates, and hydrocarbons into the air.

The number of cars on the road is increasing. In a fast growing economy like South Korea, the growth of imports and exports can increase fossil fuel combustion. Growing pollution in large cities cause further problems for residents.

=== Asian dust storms ===
Every spring, South Korea and Japan experience severe dust storms. The dust storms originate from dry desert regions in western China and Inner Mongolia. These dust storms were first recorded 2,000 years ago in South Korea and China. The effects of Asian Dust Storms are respiratory diseases, cardiovascular diseases, cause of pinkeye, obstructing visibility, and damaging goods. As a result, the mortality rate and health problems within the respiratory and cardiovascular diseases increased in 2002. These storms have also caused economic problems where damages amounted to an estimate of $15.5 billion in 2002.

=== Prevailing winds ===
These prevailing winds occur year-round from the west toward the east in the middle latitudes between 30 degrees and 60 degrees. The Korean peninsula sits in the prevailing westerlies zone between 43 degrees north and 33 degrees north. During the spring, dry sand storms from deserts in China and Inner Mongolia travel long distances with these prevailing westerlies and causing sandstorms.

== Consequences ==
=== Health ===
Air pollution can cause harm to the human body. According to the U.S. Centers for Disease Control and Prevention (CDC), increasing PM_{2.5} air pollution has been linked to cancer, heart disease, pneumonia and low birth weight. Long-term air pollution can lead to higher mortality rates. Women who are in their first and second trimester of pregnancy, are also more at risk of their children developing congenital malformations to their circulatory system, musculoskeletal system or genitourinary system. Korean researchers have suggested an association with Parkinson's disease, cardiovascular illnesses and other neurological diseases.

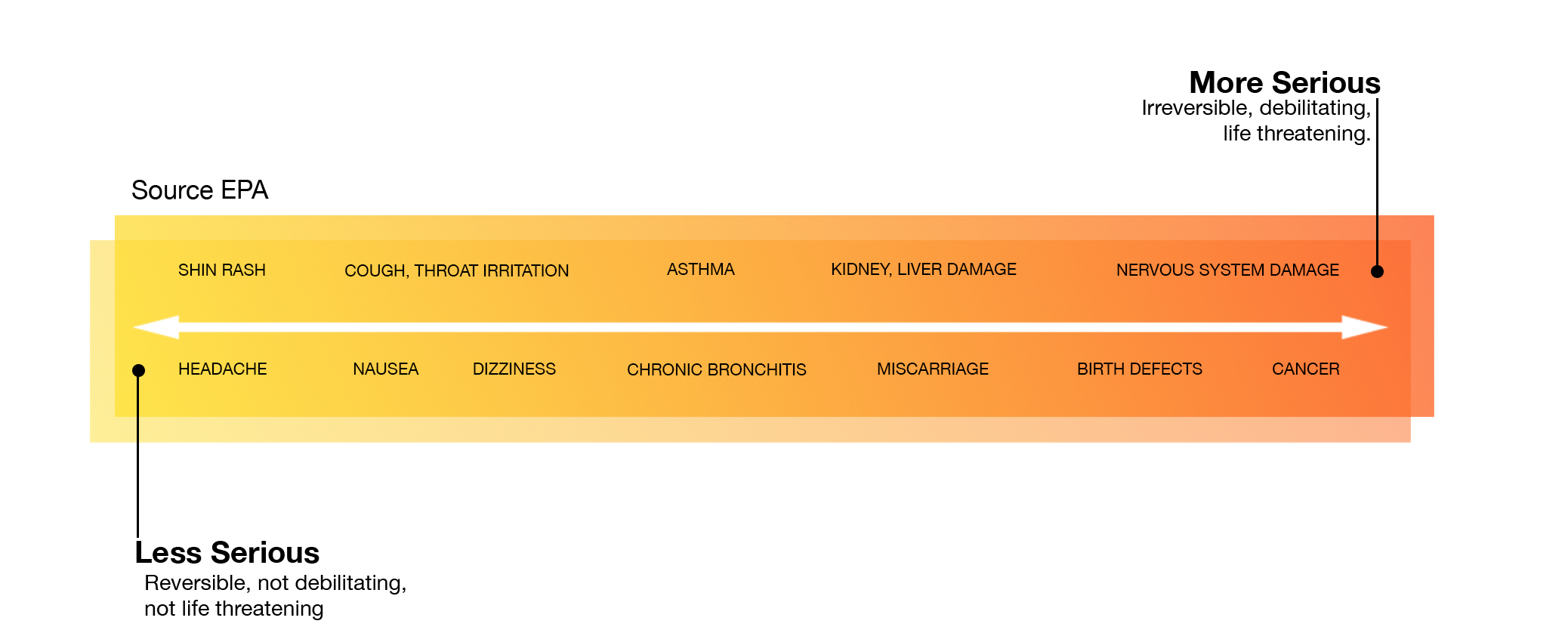
Diseases caused by air pollution

Pollution has been linked to increase in illness and deaths in South Korea. For example, exposure to sulfur dioxide causes chronic lung disease and respiratory disorders. Exposure to ozone and particulate matter is associated with respiratory and circulatory diseases and increased mortality.

The state-sponsored Korea Environment Institute (KEI) said the dust kills up to 165 Korean civilians a year, mostly the elderly or those with respiratory ailments, and makes 1.8 million ill.

According to Organization for Economic Cooperation and Development (OECD) estimates, air pollution will be linked to the premature deaths of 1.069 per 1 million South Koreans in 2060, making South Korea the only OECD country predicted to have over 1,000 deaths per million linked to air pollution. According to the University of Chicago's Energy Policy Institute (EPIC), the average South Korean citizen can expect to lose approximately 1.4 years of life expectancy due to poor air quality. Seoul, the nation's largest city, has the worst levels of air pollution, and residents of that city will live 1.7 years less if pollution levels are not remediated.

=== Socio-economic ===
People of different sexes, health behaviors, and socioeconomic levels are also affected by air pollution differently. Those in more urban areas with factories are more likely to be vulnerable to the averse effects of air pollution like citizens living in one of the seven major cities. A protest group in Seoul called Dust Out with 44,000 female members, mostly mothers petition the government to seriously consider the health situation for their children and future generations.

South Korea's decreasing air quality has an impact on a number of outdoor sports. The Korea Baseball Organization recently changed its regulations to allow cancellation or suspension of a professional baseball game in case of severe fine dust warning.

Local studies have put the economic damage caused by air pollution, largely because of lost production, at about $9 billion a year and have predicted that this will be double by 2060.

== Proposed solutions ==
=== Masks ===
A popular, affordable method for protection is the use of pollution masks. Koreans often wear masks but sometimes complain that they are uncomfortable. Cheap masks can last for a day or a few weeks. Expensive ones can last for a few months. Pollution masks are therefore not an eco-friendly solution as they generate pollution when made and waste when thrown away. Also, over a long period of time they are expensive for the majority of Korean citizens.

=== Air quality measures ===
A long-term solution is to buy an expensive air purifier for houses or cars. Citizens are asking for government subsidies for buying those expensive products, especially middle-class families. Those petitions are made on the Blue House's official website.

Another solution is to inform citizens about current air quality through air pollution maps, smartphone apps, and text message alerts so outdoor activities can be avoided when there is elevated pollution.

=== Government regulations ===
Since signing the Paris Agreement in 2016, Korea has been committed to clean its air. By 2022, domestic emissions are planned to be cut by 30% as President Moon Jae-in vowed to shut down old coal plants (while also opening new ones). The Korean Government is planning on providing air purification systems for public facilities and schools consisting of air purifiers and air purifying plants. On high pollution days, the government bans heavy vehicles and old, diesel-using vehicles. In 2018, public transportation was free in Seoul during three days on which a high level of pollution was observed. The aim was to decrease the use of cars in the city. However, the measure failed as it did not make much difference.

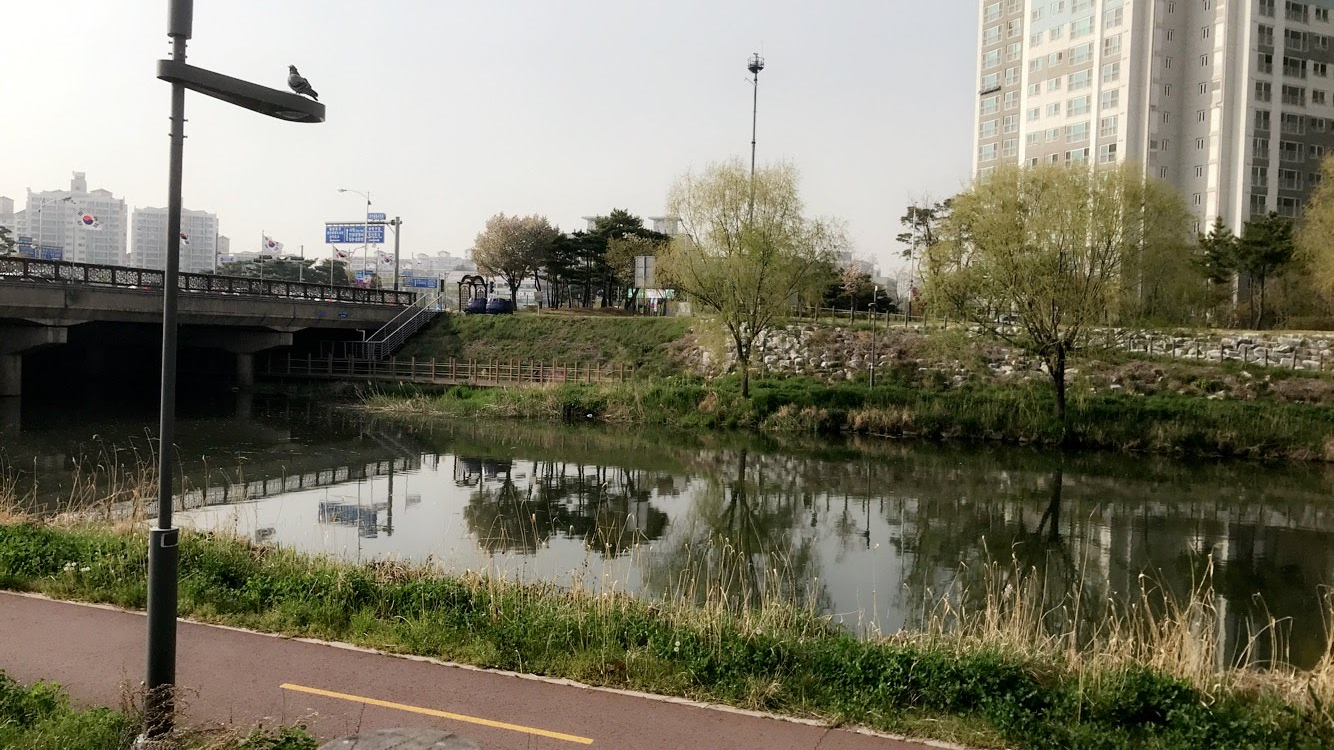
A five-mile linear park in Ansan (Gyeongi-do)

On a local level, Korean cities have many bicycle routes, pedestrian-only zones and a five-mile linear park. Diesel buses are being replaced with natural gas vehicles, and emission-reduced devices are provided to cars.

The government has taken action of improving air quality in the Seoul Capital region by implementing the Special Act on Seoul Metropolitan Air Quality Improvement in December 2003. The first phase of the air management plan took action in 2005 for nearly a decade (2005–2014). The Seoul Capital region is a metropolitan area which includes Seoul, Incheon and Gyeonggi-do province. The priority pollutants were selected as PM_{10}, nitrogen oxides, sulfur oxides, and volatile organic compounds. More precisely, its goal was aimed to reduce average annual PM_{10} and NO_{2} concentrations from 69 μg per cubic meter (μg/m^{3}) and 38 parts per billion (ppb) to 40 μg/m^{3} and 22 ppb by 2014.

The use of unmanned aerial vehicles is part of a pilot program announced by South Korea's Ministry of Environment. Its purpose is to inspect factory emissions in Seoul's greater metropolitan area. Government officials plan to identify illegal incinerations producing pollutants, fine dust, and carbon dioxide. Experts and citizens hope this plan will mark a turning point for Seoul because the area is marked as the major driver of emissions.

Another planned measure is a cloud-seeding plane that causes artificial rain to "wash away" pollution. However, the pollution is not gone but "falls down" to the earth, which can harm plants and the environment. The South Korean and Chinese governments are planning on having artificial rain in the Yellow Sea, which could kill many marine animals.

=== Green Growth Policy ===
Green Growth is an idea that was first brought up in 2009. It was the concept that countries will embrace more environmentally friendly alternatives to motivate growth as the two concepts, green and growth go hand in hand. Despite Green Growth being a concept in the making, it contains the two components that makes it a part of sustainable development: growth and environment. South Korea was one of the first countries to diligently integrate green growth into their national strategy to reduce the emissions of greenhouse gasses (GHG), pollution, and unnecessary usage of nonrenewable energy. By following the values of the Green Growth Policy that gave rise to the Framework Act on Low Carbon Green Growth in 2009, South Korea set its goals to be seventh in Green World Power by 2020 and fifth in 2050.

Before the Green Growth Policy, 96% of South Korea's energy sources had been imported. In order to honor their new policy, South Korean politicians worked to encourage energy independence while promoting green technologies and the new industry's green structure. To highlight green technologies, green lifestyles, transportation (public buses and intricate subway systems) along with sustainable water and land use were introduced to the South Korean citizens.

Despite the movement of the Green Growth Policy, there are flaws in the goals that are set to reduce the usage of nonrenewable energy. For example, President Lee Myeong Bak's target of increasing South Korea's renewable usage to 20.1% by 2029 is lackluster considering that other countries such as Sweden has set their goal for a 100% of their energy to come from renewable sources. Some countries like Costa Rica and Scotland have been successful in generating 97-98% of their energy from renewable energy sources.

=== Five Year Action Plan ===
The Five Year Action Plan was a plan that was introduced to help initiate the Green Growth Policy and kickstart green technological advancements. The Five Year Action Plan prioritized urban planning, buildings, and transportation and took place in 2009 till 2013. Not only did the Five Year Action Plan work to promote and create a new market for new and renewable energy (NRE) but it also helped to create almost 960,000 green jobs which ultimately helped the country overcome an economic crisis. Jobs were created for development of certain green technologies such as silicon based solar cells and smart grids.

Although South Korea has been dedicating around 2% of their GDP annually (US$23 billion), almost double the recommended amount suggested by the UN, private investments were needed to invest in NRE. The private investments assisted in creating a market and creating a flow of supply and demand for NRE technologies. During this phase, almost 30 different South Korean companies had invested approximately US$13.6 billion in NRE technologies. The investments from the private businesses positively impacted on reducing GHG emissions by marketing green technology. According to the environmental investment assessment of GHG that was launched in 2010, roughly 11.47 million tons of GHG emissions from their annual emission of 595.95 million tons of GHG has been reduced due to the development of 53 new businesses in the green technology field.

=== Pollution in the Seoul Metro ===
Reducing dust pollution in the Seoul Metro system was the target of a ₩300 billion investment programme spread over three years and commencing in 2024, at which date around 7 million passengers daily used the system. The aim was to install improved ventilation, air conditioning, less dusty tunnel beds, dust-trap mats at turnstiles, and publicly available information as to platform pollution. The intention was to reduce the then average pollution concentration from 38.8 μg/m3 to 32 μg/m3 by 2026. The legal limit was 50 μg/m3.

== See also ==
- Korea Federation for Environmental Movements
