= Kairospace =

South Korean space private company

KAIROSPACE Co., Ltd.
- KAIROSPACE booth at the 11th Small Satellite Workshop 2026, organized by the Korean Society for Aeronautical and Space Sciences in Busan, South Korea.
- Industry: Aerospace
- Founded: 2019
- Headquarters: Seongnam, Gyeonggi Province, South Korea
- Key people: Shin Gyung Woo (CEO)
- Products: Small satellites; CubeSat deployment systems; Spacecraft subsystems; Optical payloads
- Website: www.kairo.space

KAIROSPACE Co., Ltd. is a South Korean space company founded in 2019 and headquartered in Seongnam, Gyeonggi Province. The company develops small satellites, CubeSat deployment systems, spacecraft subsystems, and optical payloads for satellites and scientific spacecraft.

== History ==
KAIROSPACE was founded in 2019. Although the company was established that year, members of its engineering team had worked on satellite-related components since 2013, and CubeSat deployment systems developed by the team had been exported since 2015. Shin Gyung Woo is the company's chief executive officer.

The company participated in the development of the Wide-Angle Polarimetric Camera (PolCam), one of the scientific payloads aboard the Korea Pathfinder Lunar Orbiter (KPLO), also known as Danuri, South Korea's first lunar orbiter. PolCam was developed by the Korea Astronomy and Space Science Institute (KASI). KAIROSPACE designed and manufactured the instrument's optical system and polarizing filters.

KAIROSPACE also developed CubeSat deployment systems used on South Korea's Nuri (KSLV-II) launch vehicle. Its deployment hardware was used beginning with Nuri's second launch in 2022 and again on the third launch in 2023.

On 25 May 2023, KAIROSPACE's KSAT3U, a 3U CubeSat, was launched into a 550 km Sun-synchronous orbit as a secondary payload on the third Nuri mission. The spacecraft was developed for polarimetric Earth observation and for demonstrating a passive system intended to accelerate the removal of small satellites from low Earth orbit after their missions.

In August 2023, KSAT3U successfully acquired and transmitted imagery of the Sacheon and Tongyeong areas of South Korea. The images had a ground resolution of approximately 30 metres, and the mission was reported as the first successful Earth-imaging mission performed by a CubeSat developed by a South Korean private company. KSAT3U remained operational later that year and transmitted imagery of the Mount Paektu area in November 2023.

KSAT3U also carried DORB, a passive deorbit system developed by KAIROSPACE. After approximately one year of satellite operation, the system was deployed to increase atmospheric drag. By 2026, the spacecraft's orbital decay rate had increased by more than a factor of two, while other small satellites launched on the same Nuri mission remained approximately 80–150 km higher in orbit.

In September 2025 antenna, developed by the company, was installed on the rooftop of Hallym University.

== Space missions and projects ==
=== PolCube ===
KAIROSPACE's work on PolCam was subsequently used in the development of PolCube, a multi-angle, multi-spectral imaging polarimeter based on the PolCam concept. The project was developed through an international collaboration primarily involving NASA's Langley Research Center and KASI. PolCube measures the intensity and polarization of sunlight reflected by the Earth at multiple wavelengths and viewing angles for studies of aerosols, clouds, oceans, and the atmosphere.

PolCube was installed aboard the BusanSat-B CubeSat. The instrument operates at wavelengths of 410, 555, 670, and 865 nm and observes the Earth from multiple viewing angles. BusanSat was launched aboard a SpaceX Falcon 9 from Vandenberg Space Force Base on 3 May 2026 and subsequently established two-way communication with a ground station.

=== GrainCams ===
Under a project with KASI, KAIROSPACE developed the optical system for LevCam, one of the two light-field cameras forming the GrainCams payload, and delivered a flight model in 2023.

GrainCams consists of SurfCam and LevCam and was designed for operation on a lunar rover. SurfCam is intended to study the three-dimensional microstructure of the upper lunar regolith, while LevCam is intended to detect electrostatically lofted dust particles near the lunar surface. The instrument package was proposed for delivery to the Moon through NASA's Commercial Lunar Payload Services (CLPS) program.

=== BioCabinet ===
KAIROSPACE participated in the development of BioCabinet, a space biology payload developed by a research team at Hallym University for South Korea's CAS500-3 satellite. The KAIROSPACE engineering team designed and built electronic systems for the payload.

BioCabinet incorporates a bio-3D printer and a stem-cell differentiation incubator for biological experiments in microgravity. CAS500-3 was launched aboard the fourth Nuri mission on 27 November 2025. In December 2025, the Korea AeroSpace Administration reported that BioCabinet had successfully completed its initial functional tests and performed its first bio-3D-printing experiment in orbit.
