= Geostationary Environment Monitoring Spectrometer =

Air quality observation satellite mission

- Operator: NIER, KARI
- Manufacturer: BAE Systems, Space and Mission Systems
- Instrument type: UV/Vis spectrometer
- Function: Atmospheric chemistry and pollution monitoring
- Mission duration: 10 years
- Began operations: 2020
- Website: nesc.nier.go.kr/en/html/index.do

Properties
- Resolution: 0.6 nm
- Spectral band: 300–500 nm (UV, Vis)

Host spacecraft
- Spacecraft: GEO-KOMPSAT-2B
- Operator: KARI
- Launch date: 18 February 2020, 22:18:00 UTC
- Rocket: Ariane 5 ECA
- Launch site: Guiana Space Center, Kourou, French Guiana]
- Orbit: Geostationary, 128.2° E

Geostationary Environment Monitoring Spectrometer (GEMS) is an air quality observation satellite mission of National Institute of Environmental Research (NIER) of Korea, with the science P.I. institute at Yonsei University, Seoul, Korea. GEMS was built by Korea Aerospace Research Institute (KARI) and BAE Systems, Space and Mission Systems (formerly Ball Aerospace & Technologies Corp (BATC)), and launched by Ariane 5 from Guiana Space Center, Kourou, on February 18, 2020. GEMS is the first ultraviolet(UV)-visible hyperspectrometer in Geostationary Earth Orbit (GEO) to observe air quality over Asia at unprecedented spatio-temporal resolution. Before GEMS, satellite remote sensing of air quality was from Low Earth Orbit (LEO) providing observations 1–2 times a day (e.g. OMI, TROPOMI, MOPITT etc.). EPIC onboard DISCOVR has provided atmospheric composition observations including aerosol and ozone from the Sun-Earth Lagrangian point, L1, covering the sunlit part of the Earth. GEMS has provided successfully the diurnal variation of air quality over Asia in addition to spatial distribution since Nov. 2020, after the in orbit test (IOT). Diurnal variation of emissions from urban, industry, ship track, and wildfires, dust outbreak, volcanic eruption, and UV indices are well captured by GEMS.

GEMS is the first component of the geostationary constellation of air quality observation, together with the NASA's TEMPO over North America launched in 2023 and ESA's Sentinel-4 over Europe launched in 2025, as recognized by the Committee on Earth Observation Satellites (CEOS). Furthermore, there is an initiative to launch a similar UV-Vis instrument over the Middle East and Africa, known as Middle East & Africa Space-based Monitoring of Atmospheric-pollution(MEASMA) to cover missing part of the globe.
