= Chollian-2B =

South Korean weather satellite

- Names: GEO-KOMPSAT-2B
- Mission type: Earth observation
- Operator: Korea Aerospace Research Institute
- COSPAR ID: 2020-013B
- SATCAT no.: 45246
- Mission duration: 10 years (planned); 6 years, 7 months and 4 days (in progress)

Spacecraft properties
- Spacecraft type: KOMPSAT
- Launch mass: 3,400 kg (7,500 lb)
- Dimensions: 3.5 m diameter x 8.9 m in height x 4.2 m length
- Power: 2.62 kW

Start of mission
- Launch date: 18 February 2020
- Rocket: Ariane-5
- Launch site: Guiana Space Centre

Orbital parameters
- Reference system: Geocentric
- Regime: Geostationary
- Periapsis altitude: 35,857 kilometres (22,281 mi)

Chollian-2B, also known as GEO-KOMPSAT-2B (Geostationary Korea Multi Purpose Satellite-2B), is a geostationary satellite of South Korea, launched on February 18, 2020. It is a twin satellite of Chollian-2A. It can precisely observe the movement of Fine dust-causing substances in the atmosphere.

== Development ==
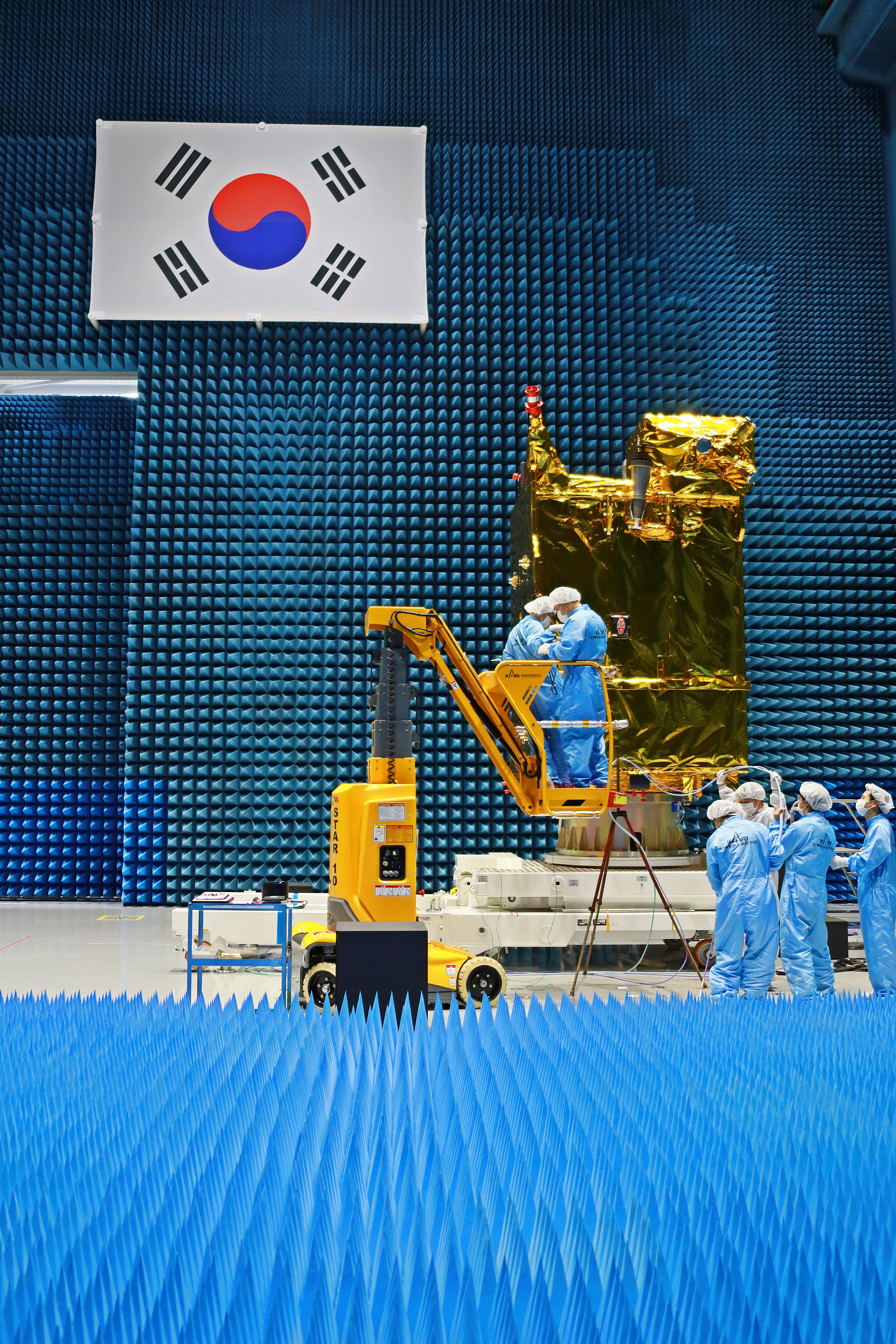
Electromagnetic testing

Chollian-2A and 2B were developed as follow-up satellites to Chollian, which was launched in 2010. They were developed over a period of nine years, starting in 2011, in cooperation with the Ministry of Science and ICT, the Ministry of Environment, and the Ministry of Oceans and Fisheries. 386.7 billion won was invested in the development of 2A, and 318 billion won was invested in the that of 2B. While Chollian, launched in 2010, carried a variety of payloads for meteorological, oceanographic, and communications purposes and played a variety of roles, Chollian-2A and Chollian-2B were designed to focus on their own unique missions: meteorological observation and environmental and oceanographic observation, respectively. Two large corporations and 36 small and medium-sized venture companies participated in the development of the 2B satellite. It is the world's first geostationary satellite for 24-hour atmospheric environment monitoring.

It passed several tests to see if it could withstand the harsh space environment. In June 2019, it passed an acoustic test to see if it could withstand the noise of a launch vehicle, in July and August, it passed a thermal vacuum test, and in October, it passed an electromagnetic test.

== Technology ==
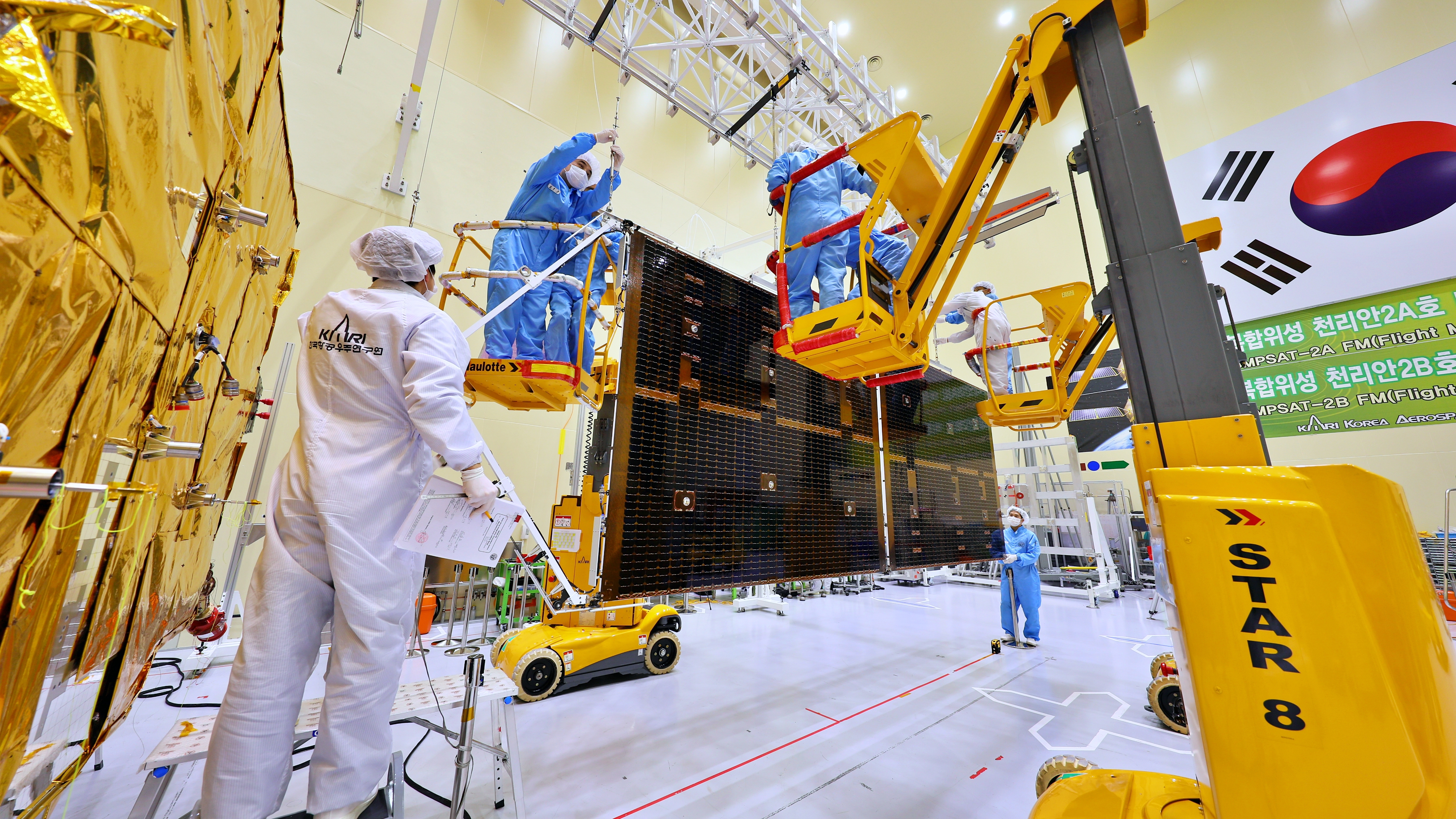
Chollian-2B combined with solar panels

The resolution of the ocean payload is four times higher than that of Chollian, and the number of types of information produced has also doubled from 13 to 26. The number of daily observations has also increased from 8 to 10. It is equipped with the Geostationary Environment Monitoring Spectrometer (GEMS), a precision atmospheric environment observation device, and the Geostationary Ocean Color Imager-II (GOCI-II), an ocean observation device.

The environmental payload, GEMS can observe about 20 types of air pollutants, including particulate matter (aerosol), ozone, and their precursors including nitrogen dioxide, sulfur dioxide, formaldehyde, glyoxal, in the atmosphere, where ozone and aerosol are climate change drivers. The ocean payload, GOCI-II provides 26 types of information, including red tide, floating algae, sea fog, and sea ice occurring in Korean territorial waters. This is twice the 13 types of information from the first satellite. The resolution is 250 metres (820 ft), which is better than the 500 metres (1,600 ft) of the Chollian, and the data transmission speed is 18 times faster.

== Mission ==
Video of Chollian-2B

It was launched on February 18, 2020 from the Guiana Space Centre on an Ariane 5. It separated from the launch vehicle at 7:49 a.m., 31 minutes after launch. On March 6, after arriving at the target orbit, it entered a test run to optimize equipment performance.

Since it is placed in a geostationary orbit above the equator at 128.2 degrees east longitude and 35,786 kilometres (22,236 mi; 19,323 nmi), it has the advantage of being able to monitor a specific area 24 hours a day. Its main mission is real-time monitoring of marine pollutants such as red tide, green tide, and oil spills, and monitoring and analyzing the movement of air pollutants. The government expects that by combining and analyzing the information sent by Chollian-2A, launched in 2018, with the observation information from Chollian-2B, the ability to forecast air pollution such as fine dust will greatly improve.

The observation range of the satellite spans from North Asia, including Korea and Japan, to northern Indonesia and southern Mongolia. It measures the atmospheric conditions of Asian countries, including Korea, China, Japan, the Philippines, Laos, Thailand, Cambodia, Vietnam, Malaysia, Singapore, Indonesia and Mongolia.

In November 2020, the MSIT, the Ministry of Environment, and the Ministry of Oceans and Fisheries released visualized air quality data from Asia around the Korean Peninsula captured by the satellite.

== See also ==
- Chollian-2A
- South Korean space program
