= Gwangpo Bay =

Bay in Sacheon, South Korea

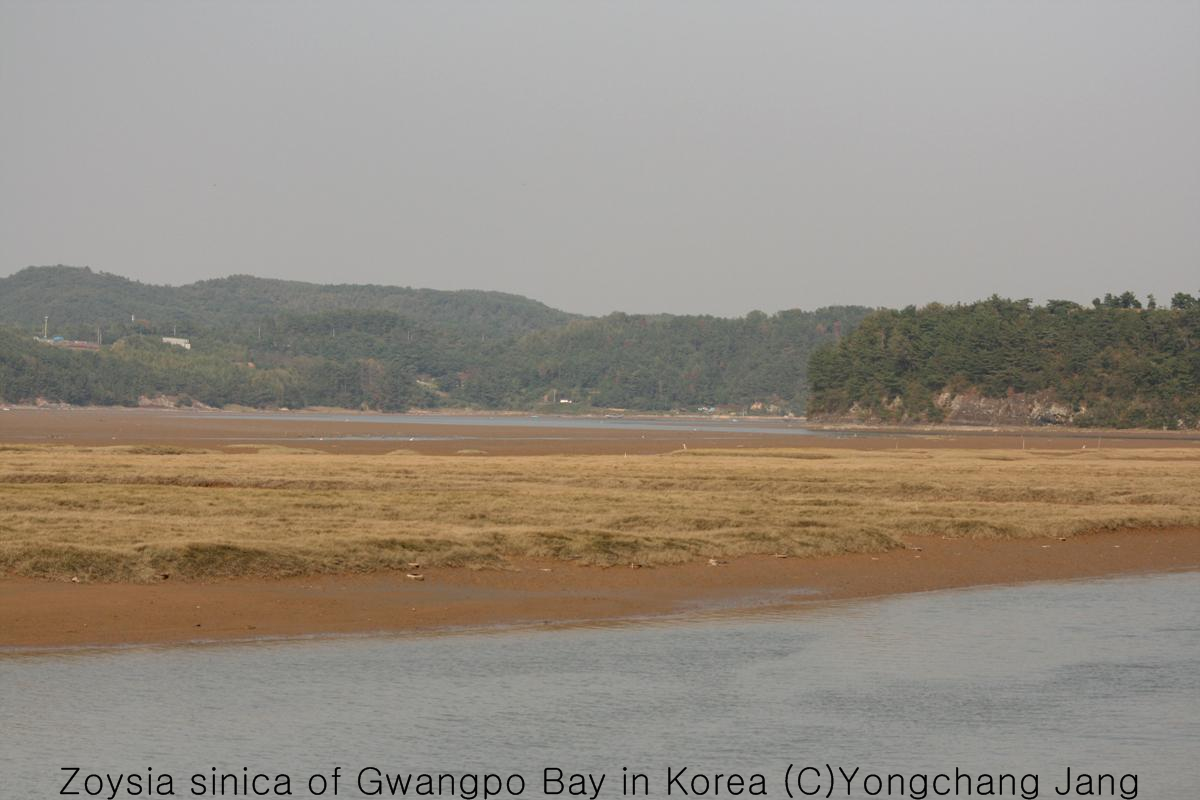
Seashore lawn grass (Zoysia sinica) of Gwangpo Bay in South Korea

Gwangpo Bay (Korean: 광포만) is located in Sacheon, South Gyeongsang Province, South Korea. The bay is located at the estuary of Gonyang Stream, and the city is located in the middle of the southern seashore of South Korea. Gwangpo Bay is a part of larger Sacheon Bay, which is surrounded by Sacheon City, Gwangyang City, and Namhae County.

According to the Korean Ministry of Land, Transportation, and Marine Affairs, a plan made by local government in 2008 to reclaim Gwangpo Bay covers an area of 1,976,256 m^{2} (488.343 acres). The length of the bay is about 3 km (1.9 mi), and the width of the bay is about 1.3 km (0.81 mi).

== Wildlife ==
According to the Sacheon branch of the Korean Federation for Environmental Movement (Friends of the Earth Korea), 117 species of birds were found in the bay by the research conducted from 2000 to 2007. During the research, 150 Saunders's gulls were found together. White-naped cranes and black-faced spoonbills were also found there.

A large area of the bay is covered with seashore lawn grass (Zoysia sinica), and it is estimated that this is the biggest population of this species in Korea. Populations of a threatened species of Ellobium chinense, which belongs to the mollusc family Ellobiidae were found in June 2008 among the seashore lawn grass.

A community of eelgrass (Zostera marina) was found in the Gwangpo Bay. Eelgrass holds a very important ecological role, as it provides fishes spawning ground, and it absorbs a large amount of CO_{2}. According to research conducted in Gwangyang Bay, next to Gwangpo Bay, 57 species of fish were found in the eelgrass.

== Socioeconomics ==
=== Population ===
The population of Sacheon City is about 110,000. The population was steady from 1995 to 2005. While the population of fishers and farmers decreased, some people migrated to Sacheon from 2006 to get jobs in the newly developed shipbuilding and machinery industries.

=== Industry ===
Traditionally, Sacheon was an important port through which marine products were transported to Jinju City, an important city in the southern part of Korea. As fish were abundant in the bay, fishing was the most important industry before modernization.

After the 1990s, the municipal government has supported aircraft manufacturing industry in the region. Korean Aerospace Industries has factories in the city with 2800 employees. The local government also supports the shipbuilding industry; SPP Plant and Shipbuilding is the largest such company in the city.

== Threats ==
The local government has a plan to reclaim almost 2,000,000 m^{2} (490 acres) of land from Gwangpo Bay for the shipbuilding industry. The government expects the cost would be 350 billion South Korean wons (350 million US dollars). Prior to the current plan, in the 1990s, a company was planning to reclaim the tidal flat. The debates between reclamation and protection have continued since then.

== Actions ==
The local branch of Friends of the Earth made a civil research group to study the bay's ecology. The group conducted monthly research from 2000 to 2007. The plan to reclaim the bay was not accepted by the central government on July 8, 2008; the local government has not given up the plan for reclamation, preparing for the next review by the central government.
