= Yoon Young-bin =

South Korean aerospace engineer

- 윤영빈
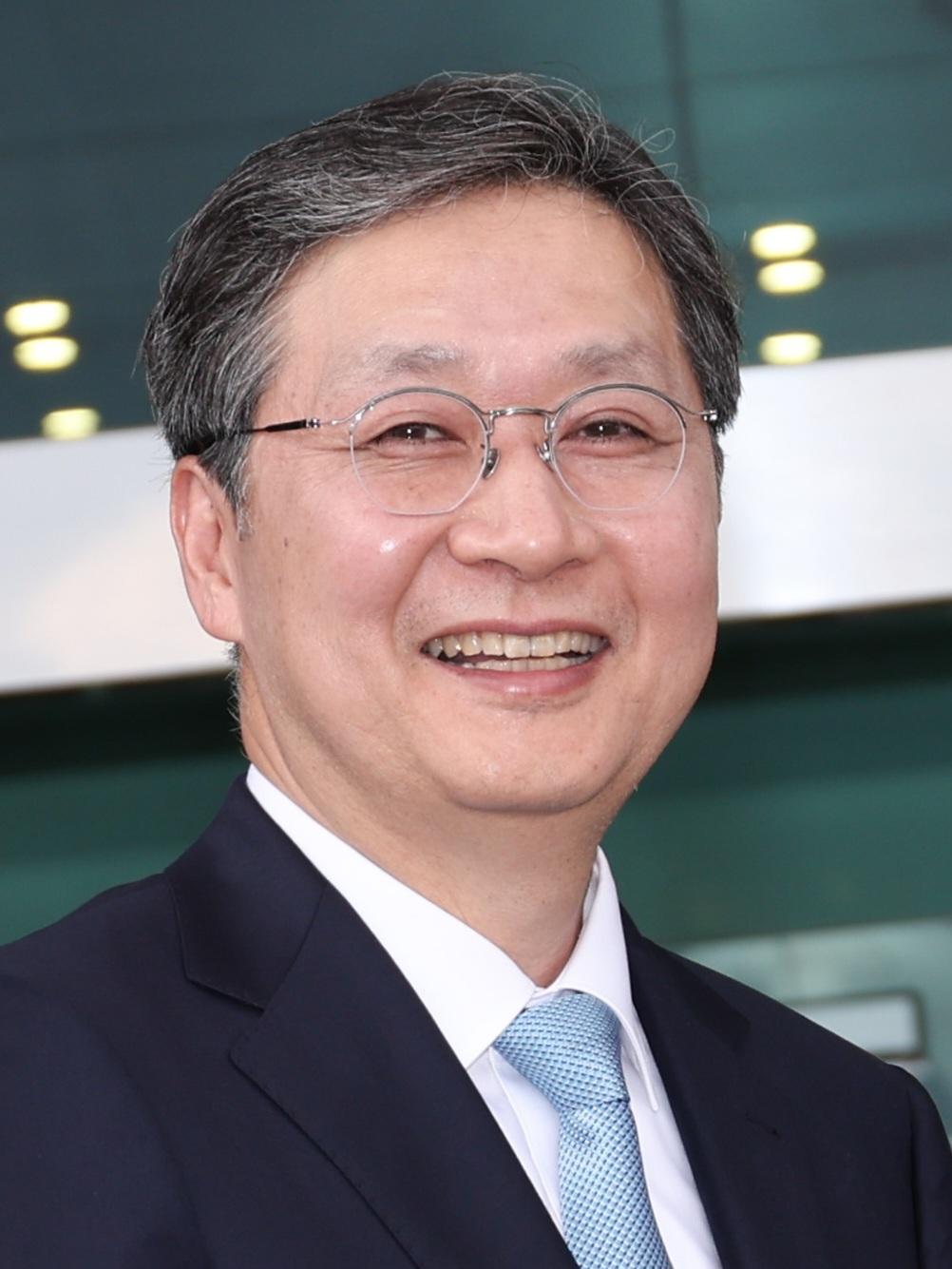
- Yoon in 2024

1st Administrator of KASA
- In office 27 May 2024 – 2 February 2026
- Succeeded by: Oh Tae-seog

Personal details
- Party: Independent
- Education: University of Michigan (Ph.D. in Aerospace Engineering)

Yoon Young-bin (Korean: 윤영빈) is a South Korean aerospace engineer and the first administrator of the Korea AeroSpace Administration (KASA).

== Career ==
Yoon has been a professor at the Department of Aeronautics and Space Sciences at Seoul National University since 1996. He has conducted research on liquid rockets and gas turbine engines for over 40 years, and participated in the development of Naro-1 and Nuri, and the first phase of the Korean Lunar Exploration Program.

He also served as the director of the SNU Aerospace New Technology Research Institute and the director of the Next Generation Space Propulsion Research Center. Sung Tae-yoon, the chief of staff for policy at the president, introduced him as "Korea's leading researcher in the field of space propulsion."

- 1994: Researcher, University of California Davis Campus
- 1996: Full-time lecturer, Department of Aerospace Engineering, SNU
- 1998: Assistant professor, Department of Aerospace Engineering, SNU
- 2002: Professor, Department of Mechanical and Aerospace Engineering, SNU
- 2024: Founding director, KASA
