= Sacheon =

City in South Gyeongsang, South Korea

Coordinates: 35°04′N 128°05′E

- Municipal City
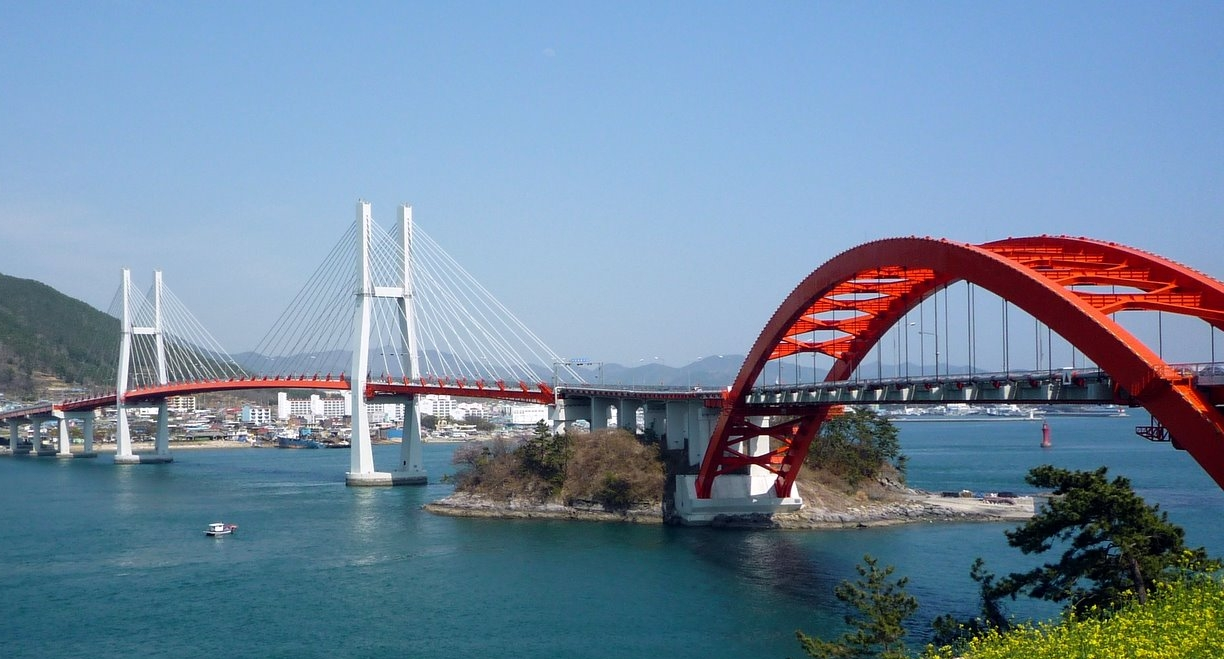

- Flag Emblem of Sacheon

- Location in South Korea
- Country: South Korea
- Region: Yeongnam
- Administrative divisions: 1 eup, 7 myeon, 6 dong

Area
  - Total: 396.99 km^{2} (153.28 sq mi)

Population (September 2024)
  - Total: 108,650
  - Density: 288.6/km^{2} (747/sq mi)
  - Dialect: Gyeongsang

Korean name
- Hangul: 사천시
- Hanja: 泗川市
- RR: Sacheon-si
- MR: Sach'ŏn-si

Sacheon (Korean: 사천; Korean pronunciation: [sʰa.tɕʰʌn]) is a city in South Gyeongsang Province, South Korea. Sacheon's chief fame comes from its being the site of two naval battles in the Seven Year War.

The city as it now exists results from the merging of Sacheon-gun and Samcheonpo-si in 1995. The northern part of the city is called Sacheon-eub and is located at the top of Sacheon Bay, near the city of Jinju. The southern part of the city is located in the old Samcheonpo-si, which is located at the mouth of Sacheon Bay.

== History ==
During prehistoric times, the local area was very important for trade between the interior and coastal area. A large central settlement called the Igeum-dong site developed in the neighbourhood of the same name in Samcheonpo. This complex site was a major settlement, megalithic cemetery, and ceremonial area during the latter part of the Middle Mumun pottery period (c. 700-550 B.C.). Several islands that lie just off the coast of Samcheonpo, including Neuk-do Island and Ma-do Islet, were also important during the same period and into the Korean Protohistoric period when this part of Korea increased its trade contacts with the chiefdoms in the Liaoning Province region of China, Taedong-gang River area of North Korea, and Yayoi chiefdoms of Western Japan (c. 300 B.C.- A.D. 300/400).

== Economy ==
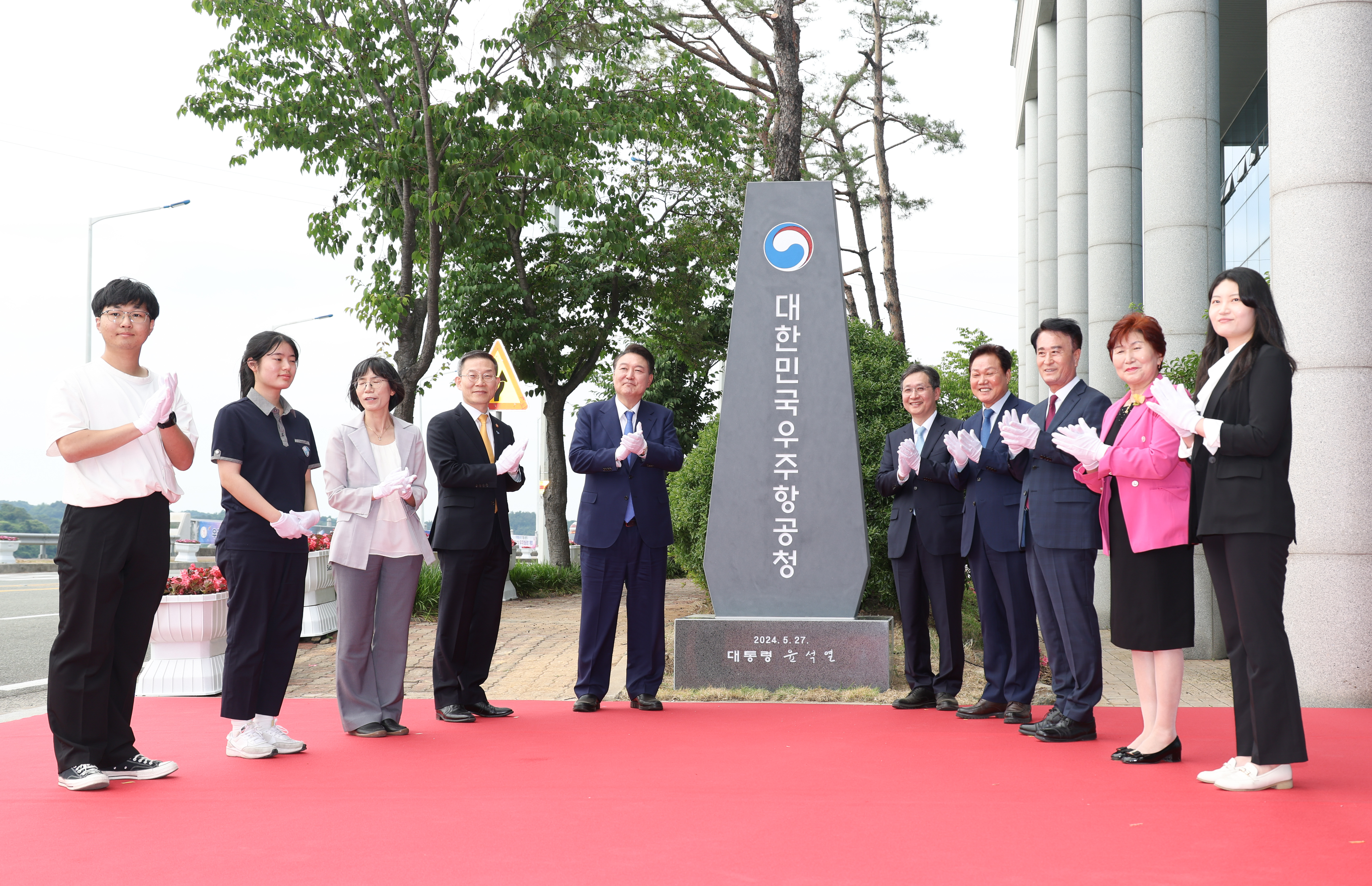
Opening ceremony of Korea AeroSpace Administration, May 2024

Traditionally, the urbanized part of Sacheon (Sacheon-eub) and the coastal settlement of Samcheonpo have different economic functions. Samcheonpo has a good harbour and has been sustained by fishing and other marine industries for hundreds of years. This part of the city continues to be a regional hub for these industries:a major fish market and a number of live fish distribution centres are located at the harbour area. Sacheon-eub is in close proximity to the Namhae Expressway and the city of Jinju, thus contains manufacturing, transport and service industry facilities.

Korean Aerospace Industries, a national aerospace company, and Korea AeroSpace Administration is based in Sacheon. British American Tobacco Korea has a major manufacturing complex in Sacheon, too. The National Aerospace Industrial Complex, measuring 803,341 m^{2} (8,647,091 sq ft), has been under construction since April 2019. This complex, which focuses on the aerospace industry, is expected to house related companies.

Much of the area between Sacheon-eub and Samcheonpo is a narrow coastal plain, and devoted to fruit producing orchards as well as wet and dry agriculture.

== Transportation ==
Sacheon Airport is located in the industrial part of Sacheon-eup, and there are two daily flights to Seoul's Gimpo airport. The Korean National Railroad passenger terminal is located in nearby Jinju. Sacheon-eup and Samcheonpo both have bus terminals that serve local and regional destinations such as Jinju, Masan, and Busan.

== Attractions ==
The harbour area of Samcheonpo contains a multitude of rustic but popular raw fish restaurants close to the waterfront. The fish and traditional market areas are nearby.

The harbour of Samcheonpo is the gateway to a number of small islands lying offshore, where people still practice a traditional fishing subsistence lifestyle that dates back to the Jeulmun Period (c. 4000 BC).

== Twin towns – sister cities ==
Sacheon is twinned with:

- Uiryeong County, South Gyeongsang Province
- Jeongeup, North Jeolla Province
- Miyoshi, Hiroshima, Japan
- Rzeszów, Poland (2023)

== Trivia ==
In Korean, the idiom "잘 나가다가 삼천포로 빠진다", literally "Was going well but suddenly slips into Samcheonpo," means that a speaker has gone off-topic.

Park Seonghwa, member of the K-pop group ATEEZ, was born in Sacheon, but was raised in Jinju.

== See also ==
- Igeum-dong site
- Gyeongnam International Foreign School
- Gwangpo Bay
- South Korean space program
- List of cities in South Korea
- Battle of Sacheon (disambiguation)
