= Deep Space =

Deep Space may refer to:

== NASA ==
- Deep Space Network (disambiguation), international network of satellite ground stations
  - Goldstone Deep Space Communications Complex, satellite ground station in California, US
  - Madrid Deep Space Communication Complex, satellite ground station in Spain
  - Canberra Deep Space Communication Complex, satellite ground station in Australia
- Deep Space 1, spacecraft
- Deep Space 2, two highly advanced miniature probes

== Astronomy ==
- Empty regions of the universe in outer space
- Interstellar space
- Intergalactic space

== Music ==
- Deep Space (EP) or the title song, by Eisley, 2012
- "Deep Space", a song by Blank Banshee from Blank Banshee 0, 2012
- "Deep Space" (Sub Focus song), a song by Sub Focus from their self-titled album, 2009

== Other uses ==
- Deep Space (collection), a 1954 collection of short stories by Eric Frank Russell
- Deep Space (film), a 1988 horror sci-fi movie
- Deep Space Industries, an American company developing and producing spacecraft technology

== See also ==
- Deep space exploration
