= KSLV-III =

Geostationary launch vehicle

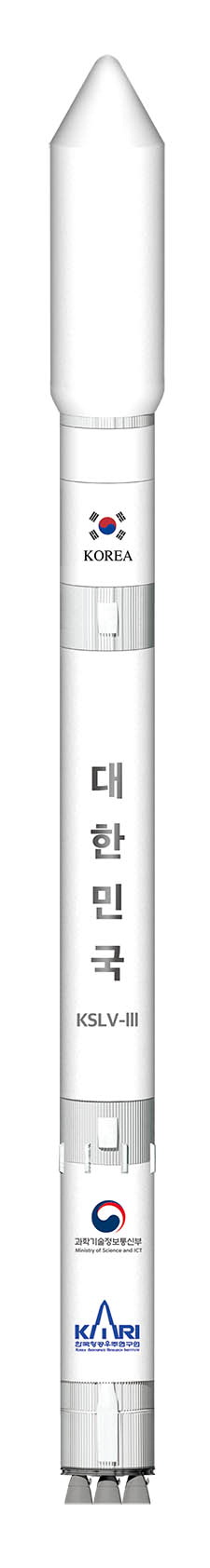
- KSLV-III
- Function: Orbital launch vehicle
- Manufacturer: Korea Aerospace Research Institute; Hanwha Aerospace
- Country of origin: South Korea

Size
- Height: 70.0 m (229.7 ft)
- Diameter: 4.2 m (14 ft)
- Stages: 2

Capacity

Payload to LEO
- Altitude: 200 km (120 mi)
- Mass: 10,000 kg (22,000 lb) +

Payload to SSO
- Altitude: 700 km (430 mi)
- Mass: 7,000 kg (15,000 lb) +

Payload to LTO
- Mass: 1,800 kg (4,000 lb)

Launch history
- Status: Planned

KSLV-III is a medium orbit geostationary launch vehicle currently under development in South Korea. The first launch is scheduled for 2031.

== History ==
In February 2018, the Ministry of Science and ICT held a National Space Committee meeting and announced the 3rd Basic Plan for the Promotion of Space Development. In the launch vehicle sector, in order to establish a self-powered launch service foundation, a plan was established to foster a launch service ecosystem based on Nuri in the first stage from 2021 to 2025, and to secure price competitiveness through a domestic satellite launch mass production system in the second stage from 2026 to 2030.

On November 29, 2022, the MSIT held a meeting of the National Research and Development Project Evaluation Committee and passed the preliminary feasibility study for the Next-Generation Launch Vehicle Development Project; it was decided to develop the next-generation launch vehicle, KSLV-III, by investing 2.132 trillion won from 2023 to 2032.

In March 2024, Hanwha Aerospace was selected as the preferred bidder for the government-commissioned Next-Generation Launch Vehicle Development Project Launch Vehicle General Production project, passing the technology capability suitability assessment.

In February 2025, the agenda to develop KSLV-III as a reusable launch vehicle has passed the National Space Committee. Korea AeroSpace Administration stated that through this, they expect to achieve the lunar exploration mission in 2032 and secure full reusability technology from 2035 to launch more than 20 times a year and secure universal access to space.

== Design ==
Compared to Nuri, which was developed in June 2021, KSLV-III is more advanced in comprehensive propulsion performance. Nuri's first stage thrust is 300 tons generated by four 75 tons liquid engines, but that of KSLV is 500 tons.

The KSLV-III's payload is over 10 tons, and it can be used to build a space station or assemble a lunar lander. Methane engines, hydrogen engines, launch vehicle reuse research, and solid booster technology are also being handled by the KSLV-III project.

In November 2022, the MSIT announced that "unlike Naro-1 and Nuri, which were developed under the leadership of the Korea Aerospace Research Institute, we plan to enter into joint design of the KSLV-III with a system integration company."

== Mission ==
One of the most important missions is to transport the Korean lunar lander. It can send a 1.8-ton object to the Moon. The launch vehicle is scheduled to be launched three times in total, and the main plan is as follows:

The preliminary model of the lunar lander will not carry any lunar exploration equipment and will only land on the Moon. The final model, scheduled for launch in 2032, is expected to carry various exploration equipment.

Flight No.	Date (UTC)	Payload(s)	Outcome
TF1	NET NET 2031		Planned
TF2	NET NET 2032		Planned
F3	NET NET 2032	KLLR	Planned

== See also ==
- South Korean space program
