= Chollian-2A =

South Korean weather satellite

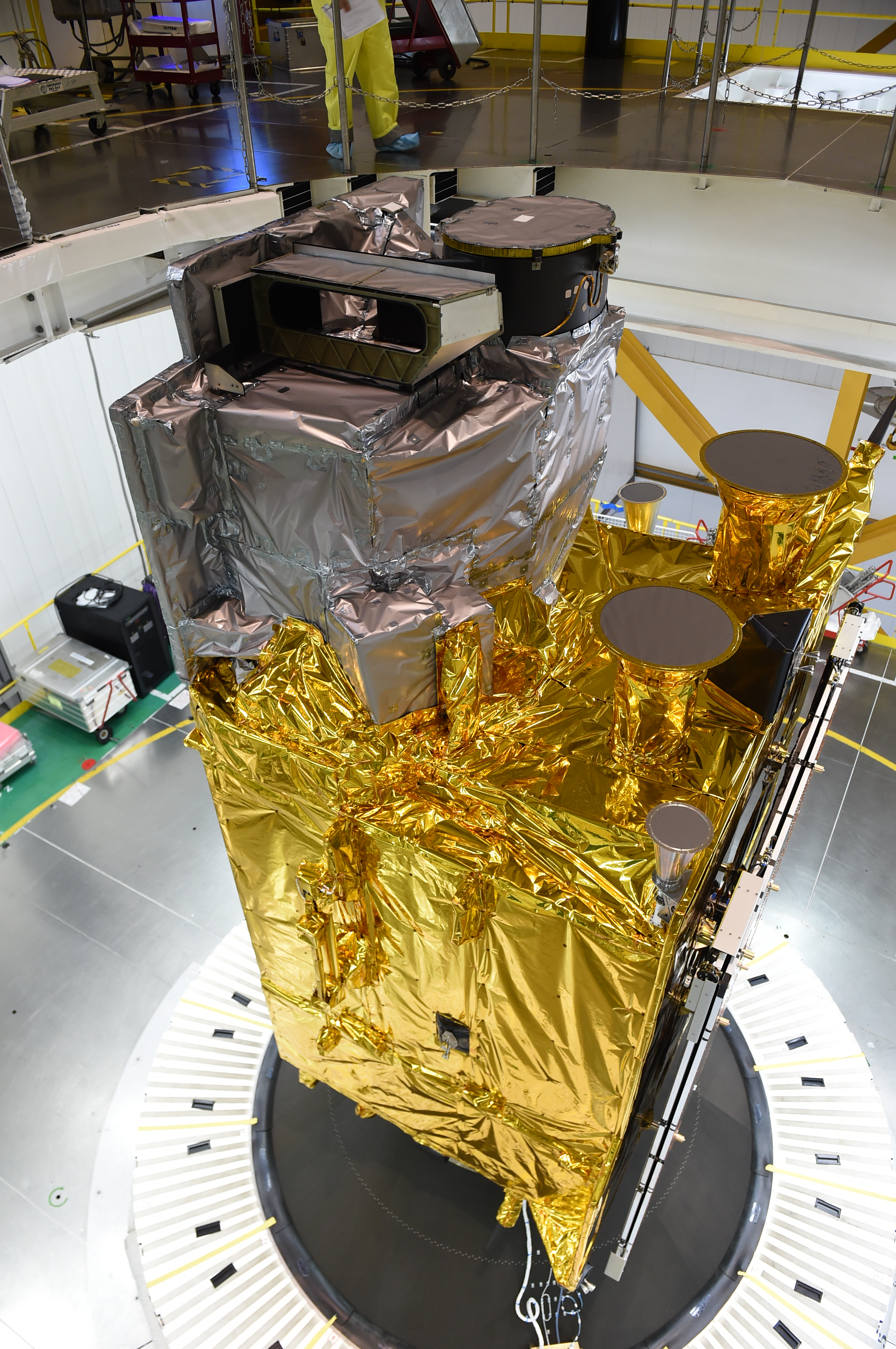
- Names: GEO-KOMPSAT-2A
- Mission type: Earth observation
- Operator: Korea Aerospace Research Institute
- COSPAR ID: 2018-100A
- SATCAT no.: 43823
- Mission duration: 10 years (planned); 7 years, 5 months and 13 days (in progress)

Spacecraft properties
- Spacecraft type: KOMPSAT
- Launch mass: 3,500 kg (7,700 lb)
- Dimensions: 3.5 m diameter x 9.1 m in height x 5.1 m length
- Power: 2.62 kW

Start of mission
- Launch date: 4 December 2018
- Rocket: Ariane-5
- Launch site: Guiana Space Centre

Orbital parameters
- Reference system: Geocentric
- Regime: Geostationary
- Periapsis altitude: 35,857 kilometres (22,281 mi)

Chollian-2A, also known as GEO-KOMPSAT-2A (Geostationary Korea Multi Purpose Satellite-2A), is a weather satellite of South Korea, launched on December 4, 2018. It is a twin satellite with Chollian-2B.

== Development ==
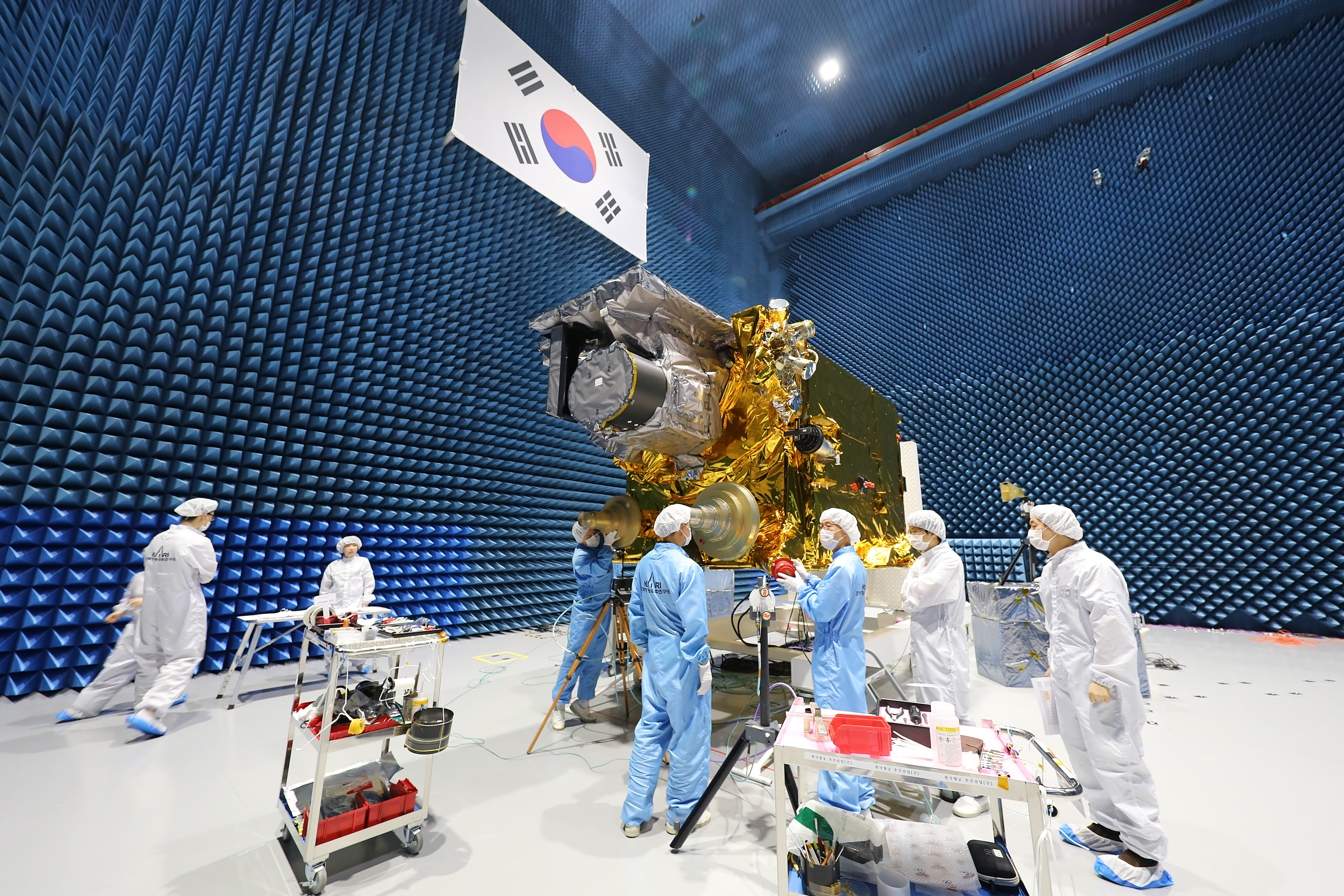
Electromagnetic wave test

The Geostationary Composite Satellite Development Project for the self-reliance of geostationary satellite development technology was conducted from July 2011 to October 2020. The design, assembly, and testing of the main body were all done with domestic technology, and through this, the technology for geostationary satellites was secured. The Ministry of Science and ICT and the Korea Meteorological Administration supported the development of the system and main body of the satellite with a total project cost of 325.2 billion won. The Korea Aerospace Research Institute, the main research institute, has been designing the satellite system through analysis of the system requirements of each ministry since March 2012.

Satellite assembly began in April 2016, and various performance tests were conducted starting in 2018. In March 2018, it passed the launch environment test, in May, the thermal vacuum test, and in July, the electromagnetic wave test.

== Technology ==
Chollian-2A can transmit high-definition color images with a resolution four times higher than that of Chollian to the ground every 10 minutes through its meteorological observation payload. The observation speed has increased three-fold from Chollian to less than 10 minutes, the data transmission speed has increased 18-fold to 115 Mbps, and the operating life has increased 1.5-fold to 10 years. The number of weather sensor channels has increased more than three-fold to 16.

A payload for observing space weather related to communications and satellite operations is mounted on the opposite side of the meteorological payload.

== Mission ==
Launch of Cheollian-2A, December 2018

It was launched on December 4, 2018 from the Guiana Space Centre. 34 minutes after launch, it separated from the Ariane 5 launch vehicle at an altitude of 2,340 km, and made its first contact with the Western Australian Space Centre ground station in Dongara, approximately 5 minutes later. Through communication with the ground station, KARI confirmed that the satellite's main body system was in good condition and confirmed that it had successfully settled into the first elliptical orbit reached by the launch vehicle.

After launch, the satellite's own thrusters were fired five times over the course of about two weeks to approach a geostationary orbit with a target altitude of 36,000 kilometres (22,000 mi) from a transfer orbit, and after settling into the orbit, it underwent a six-month in-orbit test process, with the plan to begin providing full-scale meteorological services in July of the following year.

Since Chollian-2A has 16 weather sensors, it can obtain 52 types of weather information, including typhoons, heavy rain, heavy snow, fog, and yellow dust, through the observed data. It can observe the development of localized heavy rain, so it can detect it at least 2 hours in advance. The accuracy of typhoon path tracking is improved, and space weather observation information, such as solar flares, can also be received.

Observations can be made every two minutes in the East Asian region centered around Korea and other local regions.

== See also ==
- Chollian
- South Korean space program
