= Chollian =

South Korean satellite (2010–2020)

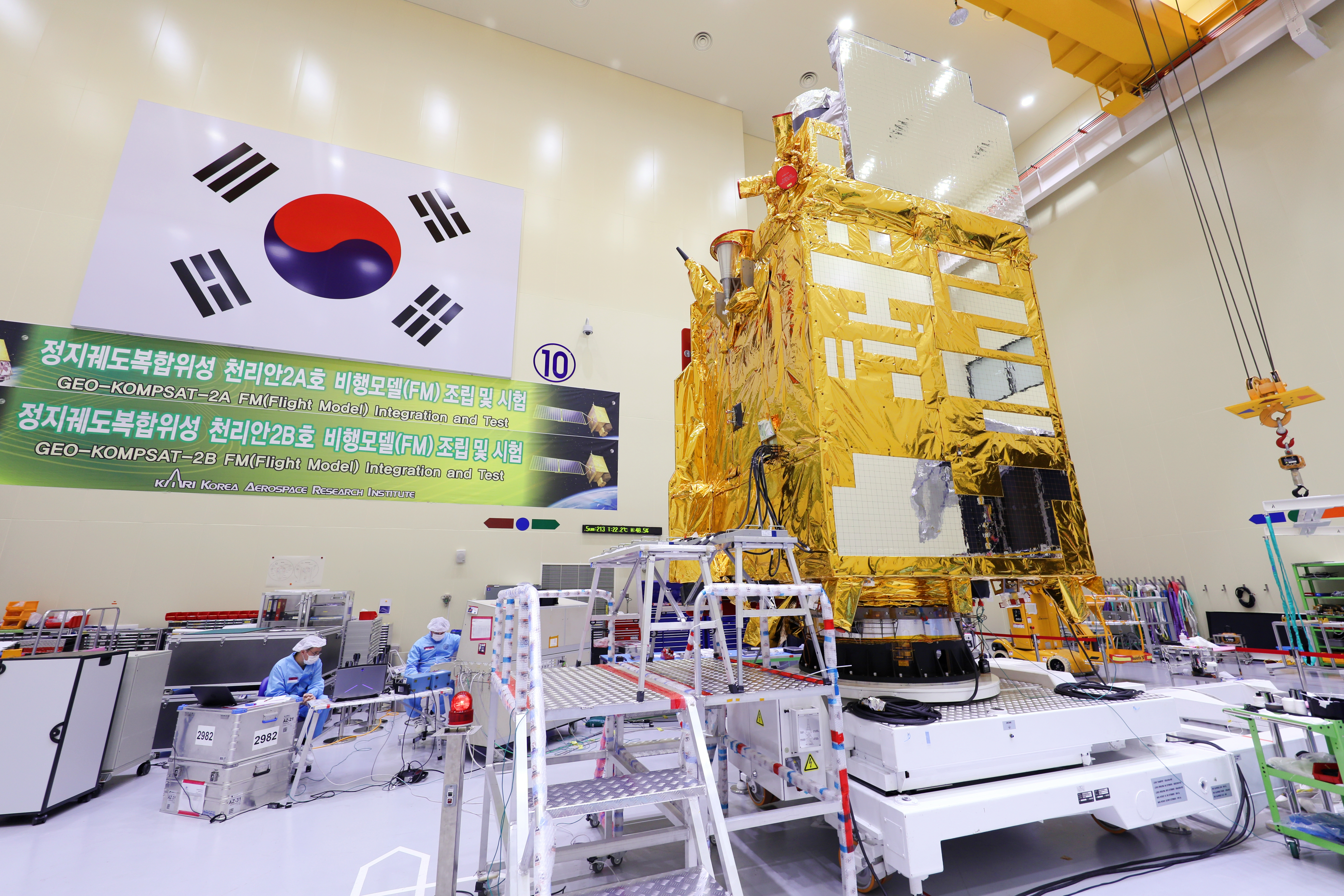
- Chollian 2A (GEO-KOMPSAT 2A) final inspection
- Mission type: Communication; Oceanography; Weather
- Operator: KARI
- COSPAR ID: 2010-032A
- SATCAT no.: 36744
- Mission duration: Planned: 7 years Final: 9 years

Spacecraft properties
- Bus: Eurostar-3000S
- Manufacturer: EADS Astrium
- Launch mass: 2,460 kilograms (5,420 lb)
- Power: 2.5 kilowatts

Start of mission
- Launch date: 26 June 2010, 21:41 UTC
- Rocket: Ariane 5 ECA (V195)
- Launch site: Kourou ELA-3
- Contractor: Arianespace

End of mission
- Deactivated: 31 March 2020, 23:59 UTC

Orbital parameters
- Reference system: Geocentric
- Regime: Geostationary
- Longitude: 128.2° East
- Perigee altitude: 35,791 kilometres (22,239 mi)
- Apogee altitude: 35,795 kilometres (22,242 mi)
- Inclination: 0.03 degrees
- Period: 1436.13 minutes
- Epoch: 23 January 2015, 17:05:20 UTC

Chollian, (Korean: 천리안; lit. 'Thousand Li View; clairvoyance') also known as Communication, Ocean and Meteorological Satellite 1 (COMS-1), was a South Korean satellite which was launched on 26 June 2010 and began operations on 1 April 2011. It was operated by the Korea Aerospace Research Institute, who used it for communication, oceanography, and meteorological observation.

== History ==
COMS-1 was constructed by EADS Astrium, and was based on the Eurostar-3000S satellite bus, bringing together lessons learned from Eurostar satellites and NASA-made GOES satellites respectively. It had a mass of 2,460 kilograms (5,420 lb), and carried transponders broadcasting in the D/E and K bands of the NATO-defined spectrum, or the L/S and Ka bands of the IEEE-defined spectrum respectively. Its single solar array generated a minimum of 2.5 kilowatts of power.

COMS-1 was launched by Arianespace using an Ariane 5 ECA carrier rocket lifting off from ELA-3 at the Guiana Space Centre in Kourou, French Guiana. The first launch attempt occurred on 23 June 2010; the launch was scrubbed due to a problem with one of the rocket's subsystems. A subsequent attempt on 24 June was also scrubbed, due to a problem with the pressurisation of the rocket's fuel tanks. The launch occurred at 21:41 UTC on 26 June 2010. The Saudi Arabian Arabsat-5A satellite was launched by the same rocket, with a SYLDA adaptor being used to separate the spacecraft. Arabsat-5A was mounted atop the SYLDA, with COMS-1 underneath it.

Following launch, COMS-1 separated into a geosynchronous transfer orbit. It used an apogee motor to raise itself into geosynchronous orbit. It then underwent testing before beginning operations at a longitude of 128.2 degrees East on 1 April 2011. Its mission was scheduled to last seven years, though the satellite had a design life of ten years.

COMS-1 was deactivated on 31 March 2020, following a two-year extension of its seven-year primary mission. Sister satellites Chollian-2A and Chollian-2B were launched in 2018 and 2020.
