= Korean Lunar Exploration Program =

South Korean space program

Korean Lunar Exploration Program (Korean: 대한민국의 달탐사 계획) is led by the Korea Aerospace Research Institute (KARI), which develops lunar orbiters and landers. The plan includes the Danuri, a lunar orbiter launched in 2022, and a future lunar lander, scheduled to be launched in 2032.

== Lunar orbiter ==
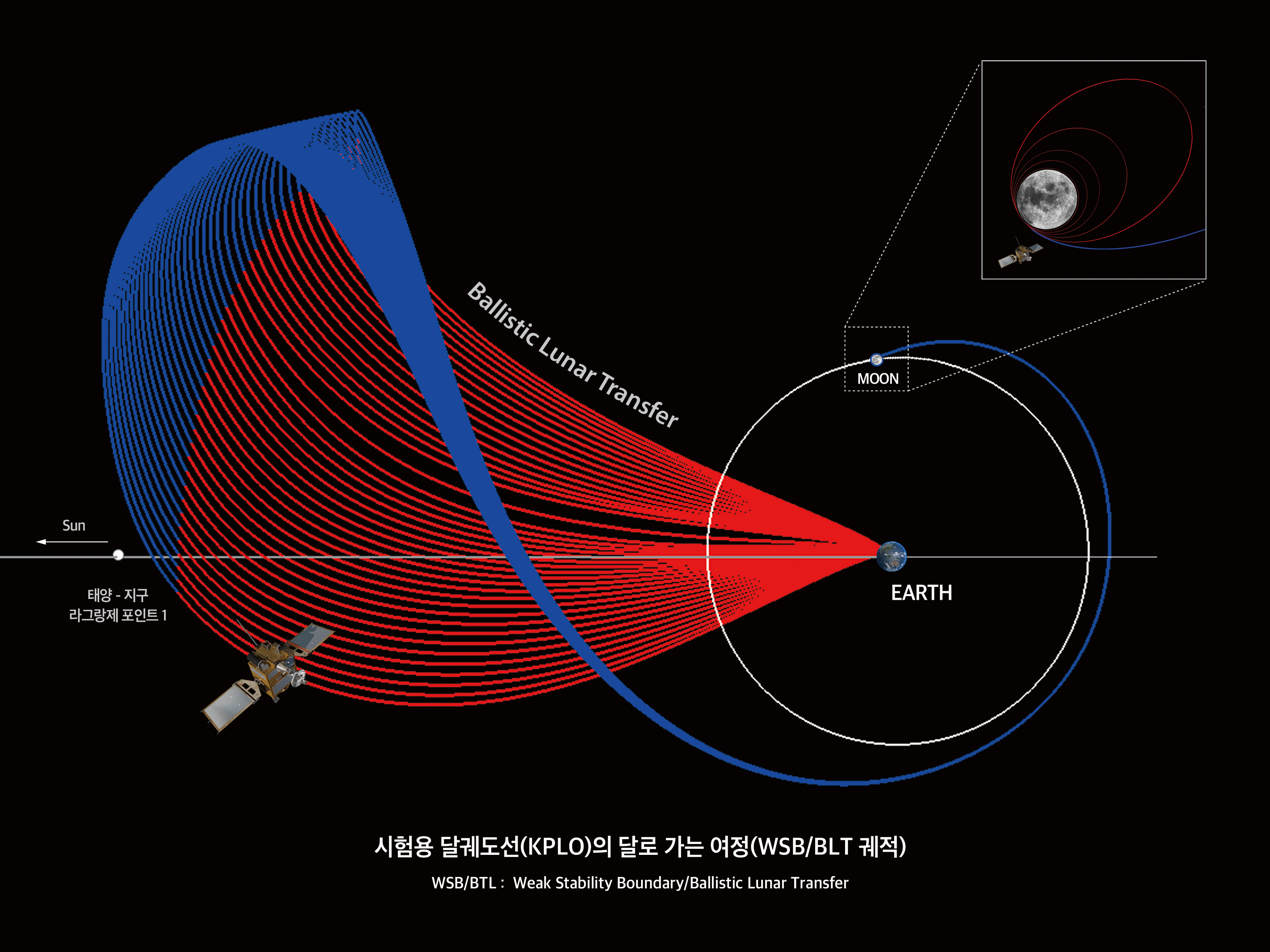
The trajectory of KPLO (Danuri) via the ballistic lunar transfer (BLT)

South Korea's first lunar orbiter is named Danuri and its main mission is to perform various scientific and technological missions, including lunar observation. Danuri is equipped with payloads developed by research institutes in South Korea. Major payloads include a high-resolution camera from the Korea Aerospace Research Institute (KARI), a wide-field polarimetric camera from the Korea Astronomy and Space Science Institute (KASI), a magnetic field measuring instrument from Kyung Hee University, a gamma-ray spectrometer from the Korea Institute of Geoscience and Mineral Resources, and a space internet from the Electronics and Telecommunications Research Institute.

It was launched on August 4, 2022 from the Cape Canaveral Space Force Station. As of August 5, 2023, its total flight distance was 38.01 million kilometers, and it sent 2,576 high-resolution photos of the Moon to Earth. Danuri is carrying out scientific and technological missions such as exploring lunar landing sites, conducting lunar scientific research, and verifying space internet technology.

Danuri's mission period was originally scheduled to end in late 2023, but was extended to end in 2025 due to remaining fuel and other factors.

== Lunar lander ==
KARI plans to launch the Korean lunar probe, a lunar lander, in 2032 using the KSLV-III. Once the preliminary design of the lunar lander is completed by 2027, the detailed design of the lunar lander is planned to be completed by 2029, after which full-scale production and testing will begin.

== See also ==
- South Korean space program
