= National Aerospace Industrial Complex =

Industrial complex in South Korea

The National Aerospace Industrial Complex (Korean: 우주항공국가산업단지) is a South Korean national industrial complex that will be built in Sacheon and Jinju, South Gyeongsang Province in June 2025, and is the largest aerospace industry cluster in Korea. Complex is divided into two zones: Jinju and Sacheon.

South Gyeongsang Province accounts for 43% of the national space industry production, and is home to Korea Aerospace Industries and Hanwha Aerospace, as well as 125 industrial complexes.

== History ==
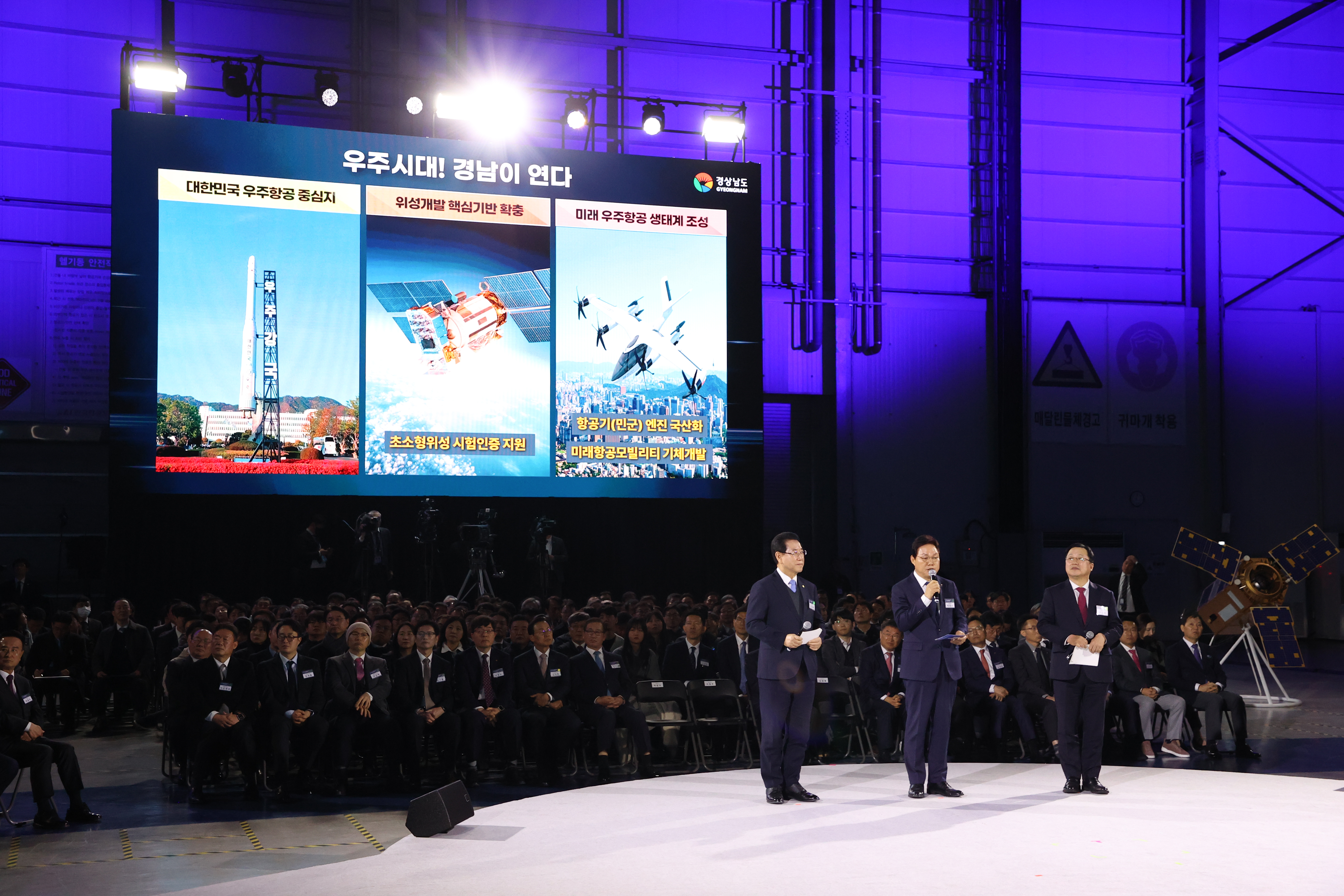
Launching Ceremony of Korea Space Industry Cluster, Sacheon, March 2024

In April 2017, the government newly approved a national industrial complex specializing in the aerospace industry by dividing the areas of Jinju and Yonghyeon-myeon, Sacheon, South Gyeongsang Province, which are close to Korea Aerospace Industries, into the Jinju District and Sacheon District, each measuring exactly 828,999.

In December 2022, the National Space Committee selected Jinju and Sacheon as a Satellite Specialized Zone, a cluster of private space-related companies.

In March 2024, Jinju and Sacheon government established the Smart Green Industrial Complex Basic Plan. Afterwards, the project executor, Korea Land & Housing Corporation, requested the Ministry of Land, Infrastructure and Transport to designate it, and the ministry designated the National Aerospace Industrial Complex as a Smart Green Industrial Complex after consultation with relevant organizations and deliberation by the Industrial Location Policy Deliberation Committee.

The development area has been partially modified, and the development period from 2017 to October 2024 was extended to June 2025.

== Sacheon District ==
This area is in Yongyeon-myeon, Sacheon City.

The Satellite Development Innovation Center is planned to be built here with a total project cost of 38.1 billion won, with 1 underground floor and 2 above-ground floors, and a total floor area of 5,900 m^{2}. It will serve as a hub that brings together all the infrastructure necessary for satellite-related research, manufacturing, and commercialization. It will also serve as a dedicated support center that supports the entire satellite industry, such as promoting startups, supporting companies, and training professional personnel.

== Jinju District ==
This area is in Yeha-ri, Jeongchon-myeon, Jinju City.

The Space Components Testing Center of the Korea Testing Laboratory currently located in Sangdae-dong, Jinju plans to invest 155.4 billion won by 2028 to expand and relocate the space environment testing facility to Jinju, which will be 10 times the current size, with 1 underground floor and 3 above-ground floors. It will be equipped with orbital and launch environment testing equipment and ground testing equipment.

== See also ==
- Manufacturing in South Korea
- South Korean space program
