= Battle of Sacheon =

Battle of Sacheon may refer to:

- Battle of Sacheon (1592)
- Battle of Sacheon (1598)
