= National Institute of Environmental Research =

Coordinates: 37.5691°N 126.6403°E

- 국립환경과학원
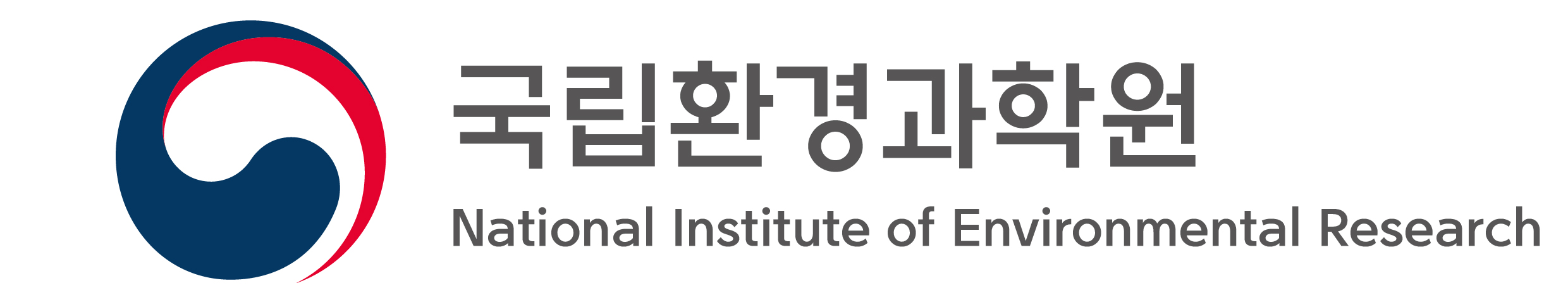

Agency overview
- Formed: 1978
- Agency executive: Seong-Kyu Yoon
- Website: www.nier.go.kr

Korean name
- Hangul: 국립환경과학원
- Hanja: 國立環境科學院
- RR: Gungnip hwangyeong gwahagwon
- MR: Kungnip hwan'gyŏng kwahagwŏn

The National Institute of Environmental Research, or NIER, is a research agency operated by the South Korean government. Its president is Seong-Kyu Yoon. It is charged with environmental research, education, international cooperation, and setting criterion levels for various pollutants. The main building for the institute is located in Gyeongseo-dong, Seo-gu, Incheon.

NIER was first established in 1978 as the National Environment Protection Institute. It gained its current name and status in 1986.

== See also ==
- Science in South Korea
- Environment of South Korea
- Government of South Korea
