= Deep Space Network (disambiguation) =

A Deep Space Network is a communication network that supports interplanetary spacecraft missions; several instances exist, such as:

- NASA Deep Space Network, a worldwide network of large antennas and communication facilities, located in the United States (California), Spain (Madrid), and Australia (Canberra), that supports interplanetary spacecraft missions
- Chinese Deep Space Network, a network of large antennas and communication facilities that supports the lunar and interplanetary spacecraft missions of China
- European Deep Space Network
- Japanese Deep Space Network
- Indian Deep Space Network, an Indian network of large antennas and communication facilities that supports the interplanetary spacecraft missions of India
- Russian Deep Space Network, a Russian managed network of large antennas and communication facilities that supports interplanetary spacecraft missions, and radio and radar astronomy observations for the exploration of the Solar System and the universe
