= Manufacturing in South Korea =

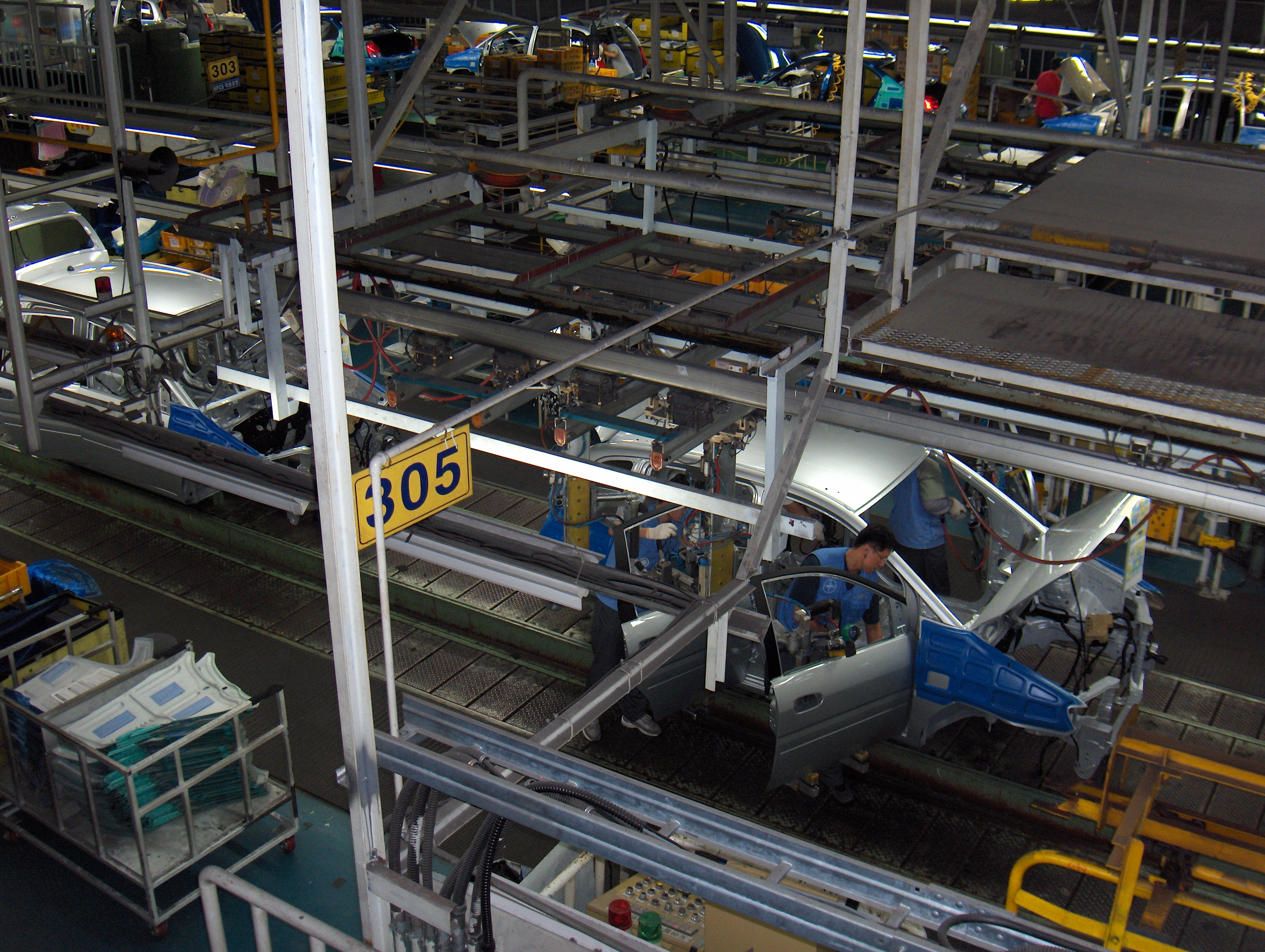
Automobile manufacturing in Ulsan, South Korea

South Korea's major export industries include semiconductors, automobiles, and shipbuilding. Other major industries in South Korea are electronics, telecommunications, chemicals, and steel. The country's manufacturing output is the sixth highest in the world. Well-known Korean manufacturing and tech companies include Hyundai Motors, Samsung Electronics, LG Electronics, Kia, SK Hynix, Celltrion, Posco, Krafton, Hancom, and NCSoft.

== Steel ==
The steel industry plays a key role in the South Korean economy as it is the material for major industries such as automobiles, shipbuilding, and construction. In South Korea, the steel industry's GDP is 1.5 percent of all industries, and 4.9 percent of the manufacturing industry. In 2016, steel exports were $27.7 billion and imports were $19.4 billion.

As of 2021, POSCO was the world's seventh largest producer of steel. Hyundai Steel was the world's 18th largest producer of steel.

Major South Korean steel companies include:

- Dongkuk Steel
- Posco
- Hyundai Steel

== Shipbuilding ==
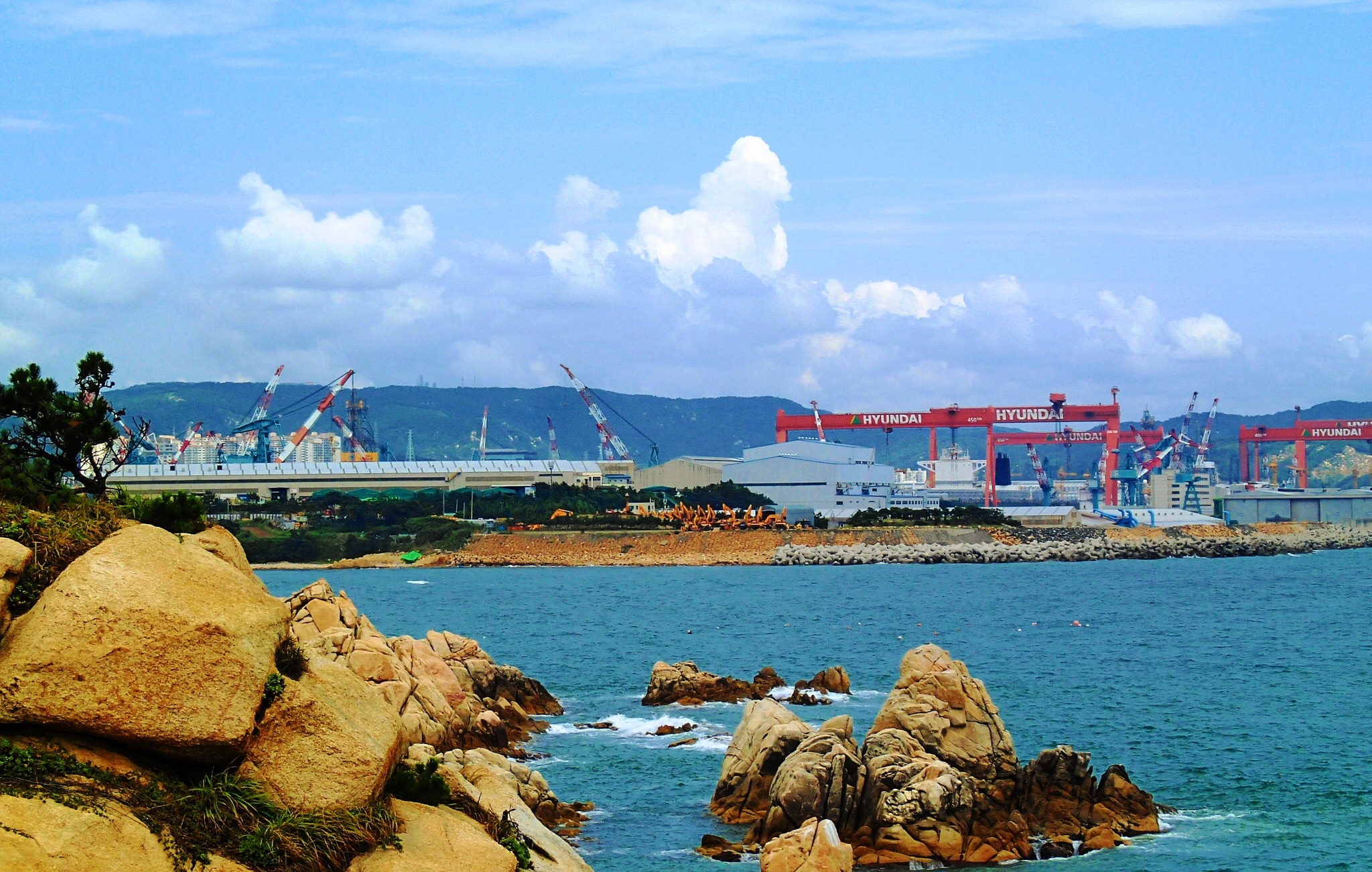
Hyundai Heavy Industries shipyard and cranes in Ulsan

Global Orders of Large LNG Carriers (2022)
1. Won by South Korea (70.0%)
2. Won by other countries (30.0%)

The South Korean shipbuilding industry holds the world's largest market share, winning 58% of the orders for high value-added ships orders and 70% of large LNG carriers ordered in 2022. Also the country's shipbuilders accounted for 62% of the world's orders, according to an October 2023 survey. Even in the eco-friendly ship market, the country has won more than 50% of the world's 26.06 million CGT orders. The country won 54% of the orders for LNG-powered ships.

Major South Korean shipbuilding companies include:

- HJ Shipbuilding & Construction
- STX Corporation
- Samsung Heavy Industries
- HD Hyundai Heavy Industries

== Shipping ==
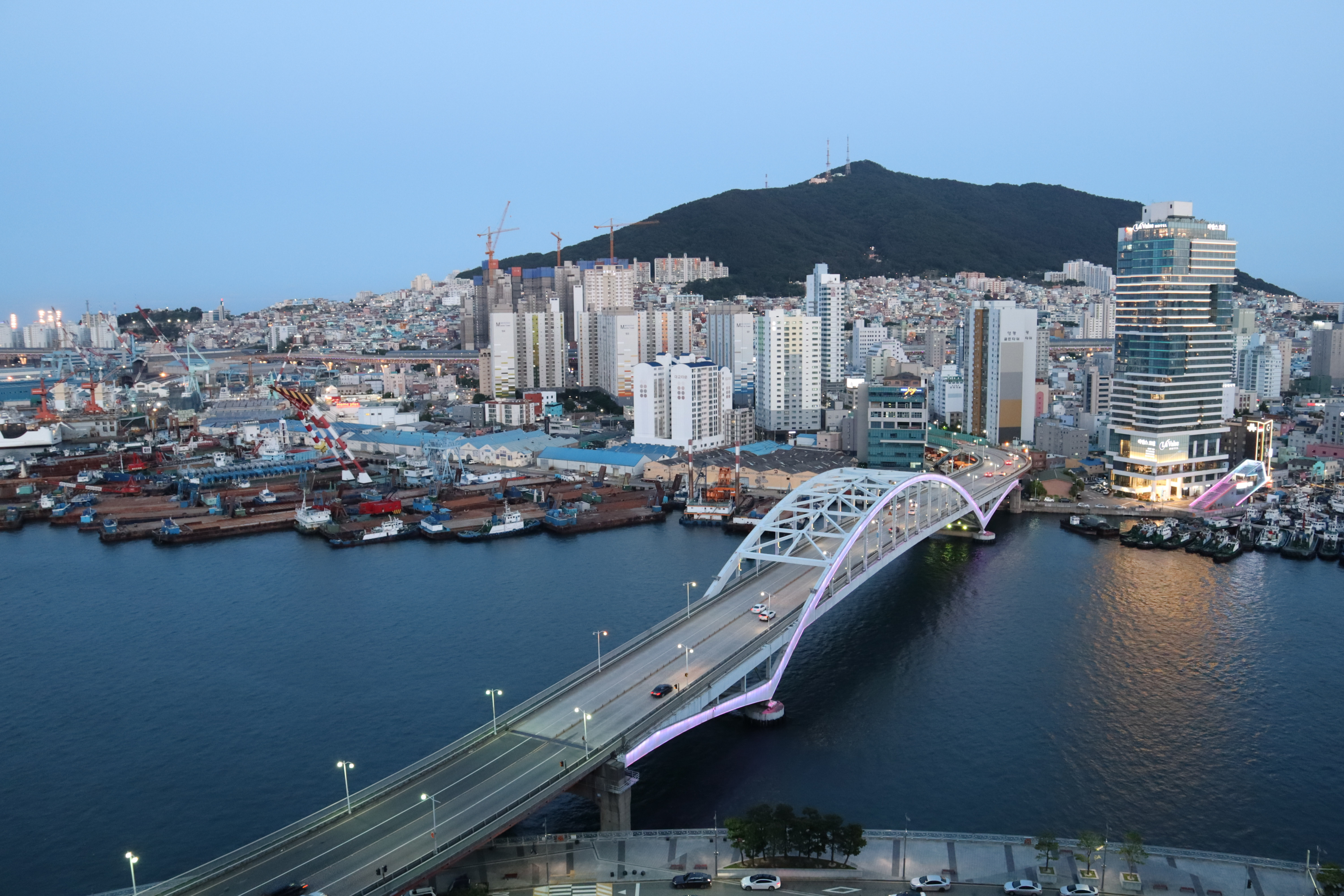
Busan is the center of South Korea's exports.

Busan Port in southern South Korean city, Busan, is the world's sixth largest container port. Hyundai Merchant Marine remains eighth in the world with a 3.1% share in the global container market.

Major South Korean shipping companies include:

- Pan Ocean
- Kobee
- Hyundai Glovis
- HMM
- Hanjin Shipping
- EUKOR
- Chonghaejin Marine

== Biotechnology and pharmaceutics ==
In the South Korean pharmaceutical industry, exports of finished products, pharmaceutical substances, and technology are steadily increasing. The total export of Korean drugs sold in 188 countries in 2016 was $3.12 billion, an increase of 6% compared to 2015. In 2017 alone, eight technology transfers were made, with $1.23 billion in technology exports.

A representative biotech industrial complex is the Osong Life Science Complex in Cheongju, North Chungcheong Province.

Top 10 export countries of South Korea in 2016 (Unit: 1,000 U.S. Dollars)
Country	Raw materials	Finished products	Total
Japan	304,626	158,180	462,860
Croatia	28	397,830	397,858
Ireland	228,835	2,771	231,606
China	95,938	112,084	208,022
Vietnam	23,472	158,980	182,452
Hungary	374	134,660	135,034
United States	86,215	30,065	116,280
Brazil	18,386	94,873	113,259
Germany	60,804	20,167	80,972
India	54,769	22,073	76,841
Others	535,624	579,643	1,115,267
Total	1,409,072	1,711,325	3,120,397

South Korea is a global biopharmaceutical powerhouse with human resources and infrastructure equipped with clinical research capabilities and IT platforms. Korea ranks fourth in biopharmaceutical technology after the United States, the EU, and Japan.

President Yoon Suk Yeol announced goal to raise the production volume of the bio industry to 200 trillion won by 2035. In January 2025, the National Bio Committee was launched.

== Oil and gas and petrochemical ==
The petrochemical industry is a key industry that plays an important role and export, accounting for 6.1% of South Korea's total manufacturing production, 4.4% of added value, and 8.2% of exports.

South Korean petrochemical companies raised their forecast for Ethylene production capacity in 2018 to 14.03 million tons by 2023 through a series of investment plans based on their positive performance in recent years to maintain their competitiveness in the global market.

Major South Korean petrochemicals companies include:

- LG Chem
- Hanwha Solutions
- Lotte Chemical
- Kumho Petrochemical

== Oil refining ==
South Korea is the fifth-largest country with refining capacity, capable of refining almost 3.6 million barrels of oil a day as of 2021. The country produces a wide range of petrochemicals, from fuel oil to lubricating oil, and has several large petrochemical companies.

Major South Korean oil refining companies include:

- SK Energy
- GS Caltex
- S-Oil
- Hyundai Oil Bank

== Motor vehicles and machinery ==
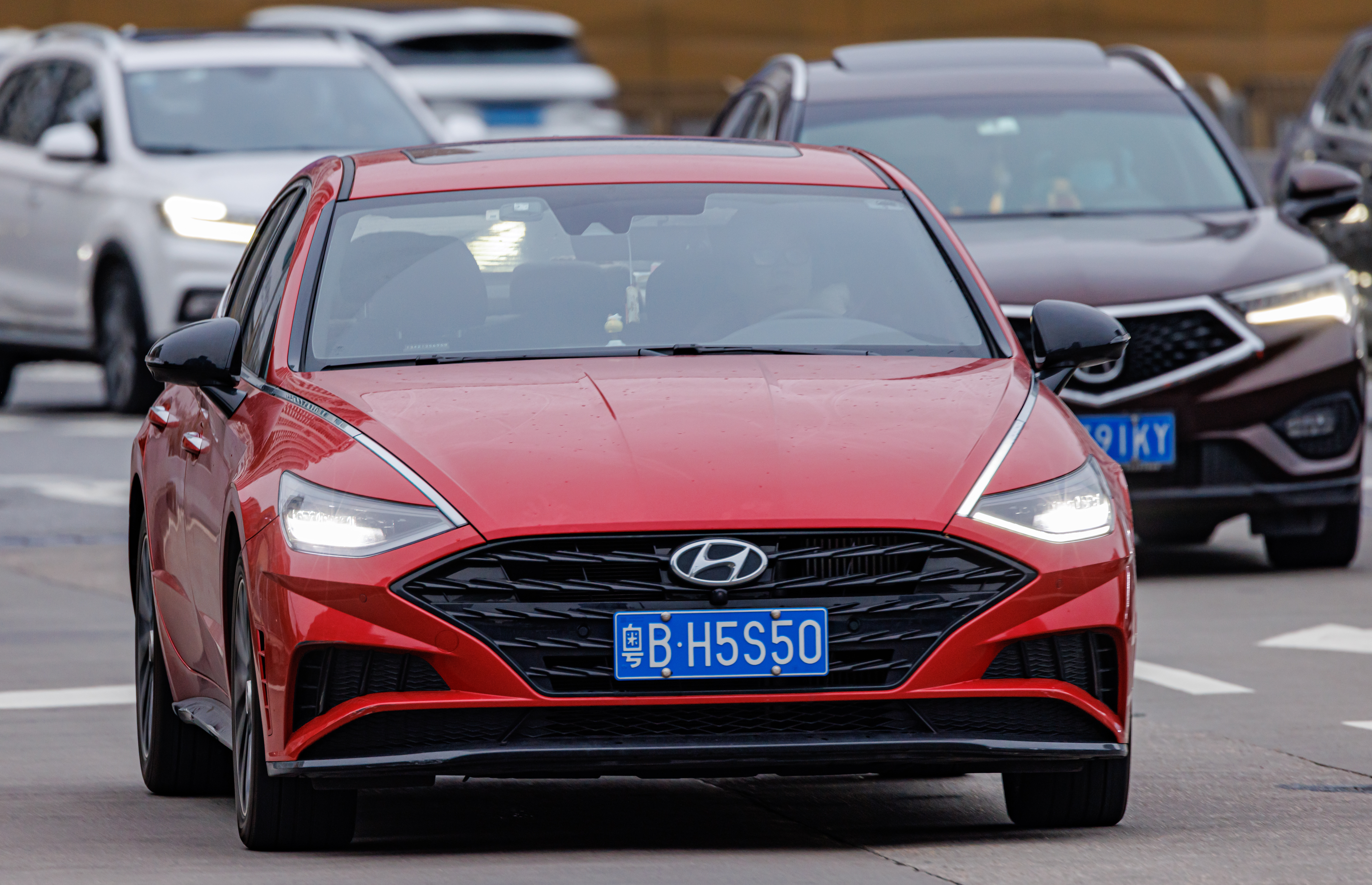
Hyundai Sonata]

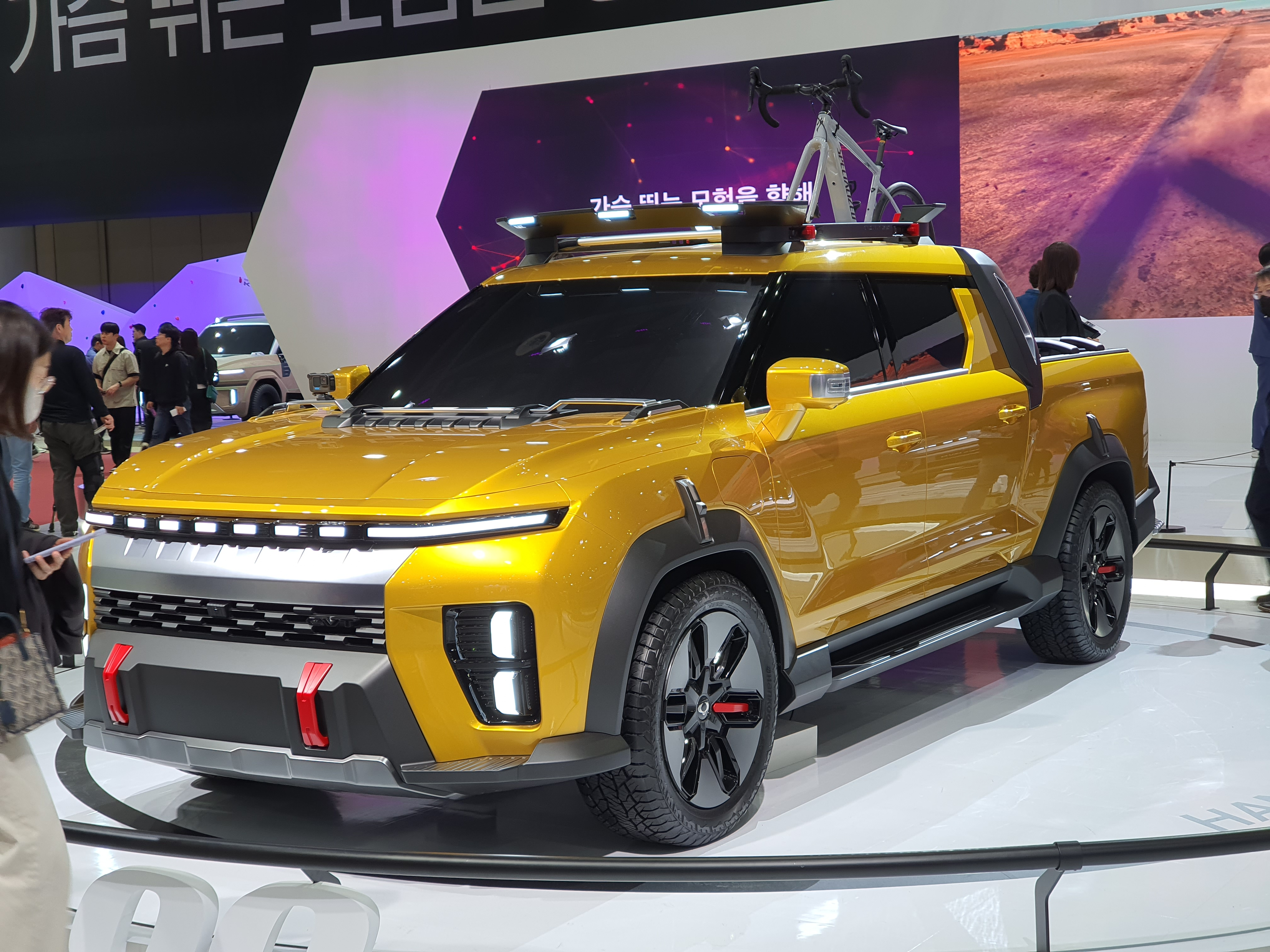
KG Mobility O100 Concept at Seoul Mobility Show 2023

The Korean automobile industry produced 3.51 million units in 2020, ranking fifth in the world after China, the United States, Japan, and Germany. In addition to automobile production, parts, materials, sales, repair, and service utilization play a pivotal role in the South Korean economy.

South Korea's major global automakers are Hyundai Motor, Kia and Genesis, one of the world's three largest automakers in terms of sales.

The auto parts industry is also important to South Korea, with nine South Korean companies listed on the list of the top 100 auto parts companies based on sales in 2020.

Major South Korean auto parts makers include:

- Hyundai Mobis
- Hyundai Transys
- Hyundai Wia
- Hanson Systems
- Mando
- SL
- Yura Corporation
- Seoyon E-Hwa
- Hyundai Kefico

== Aerospace ==
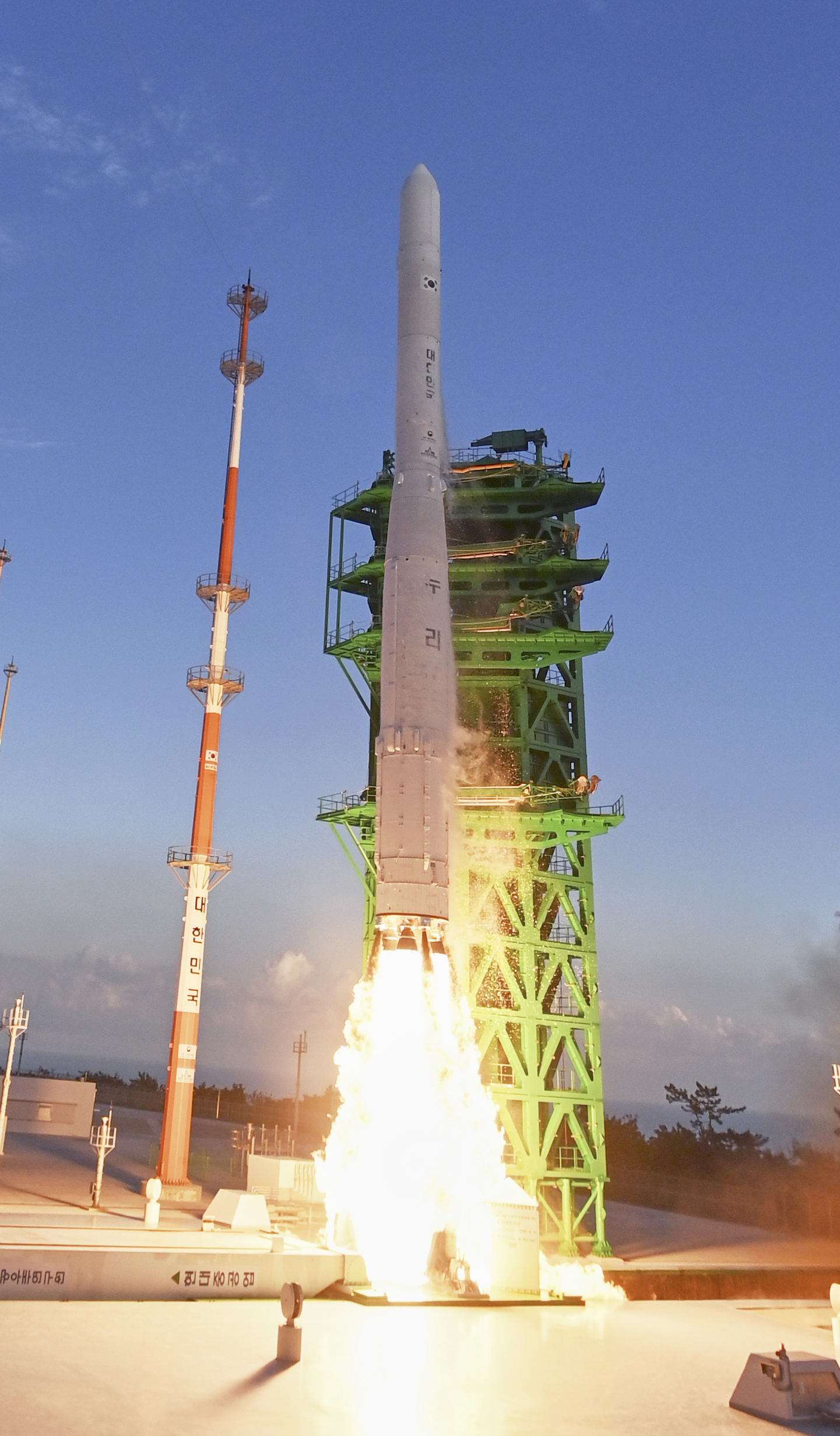
KSLV-II Nuri launching from the Launch Pad 2 at Naro Space Center, 21 October 2021

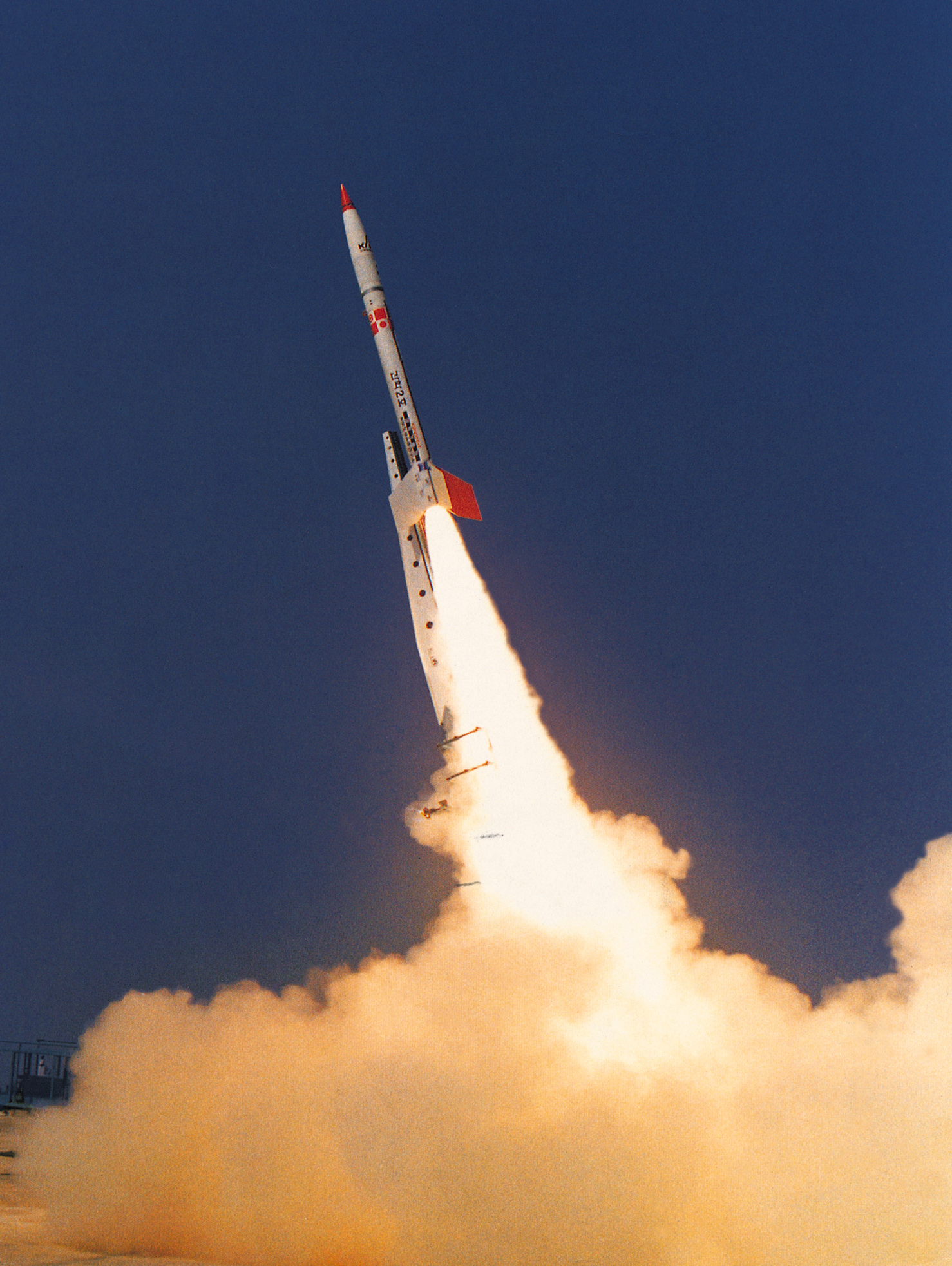
The launch of KARI KSR-1

Korea Aerospace Research Institute, KARI, developed the first-stage solid-propelled science rocket (KARI KSR-1, 1993), the second-stage solid-propelled medium-sized science rocket (KARI KSR-2, 1998) and the liquid-propelled science rocket (KARI KSR-3, 2002). It developed the Naro space launch vehicle, which was successful in launching in 2013, and gained know-how and experience in space launch vehicles. Currently, South Korea has developed a three-stage Korean rocket (Nuri) and launched a 1.5-ton application satellite at an altitude of about 600-800 kilometers into solar synchronous orbit. With the development of the Nuri space rocket, South Korea has finally secured three elements of space development: a satellite, a projectile, and a launch site.

== Semiconductor ==
As of 2022, South Korea accounted for 60.5% of the global memory semiconductor market, with a DRAM market share of 70.5% and a NAND market share of 52.6%. South Korea is continuously focusing on R&D and investment to maintain its competitive advantage. In addition, South Korea is pushing to expand its foundry market share based on ultra-fine processing technology. The country accounts for 17.3% of the global foundry market. semiconductor exports reached a record $15 billion in August 2025, an increase of nearly a third from 2024, contributing to total monthly exports of $58.4 billion.

Global memory semiconductor market share (2022)
1. South Korea (60.5%)
2. other countries (39.5%)
Global DRAM market share (2022)
1. South Korea (70.5%)
2. other countries (29.5%)
Global NAND market share (2022)
1. South Korea (52.6%)
2. other countries (47.4%)

Major South Korean semiconductor companies include:

- Seoul Semiconductor
- Samsung Electronics
- SK Hynix

== Electronics ==
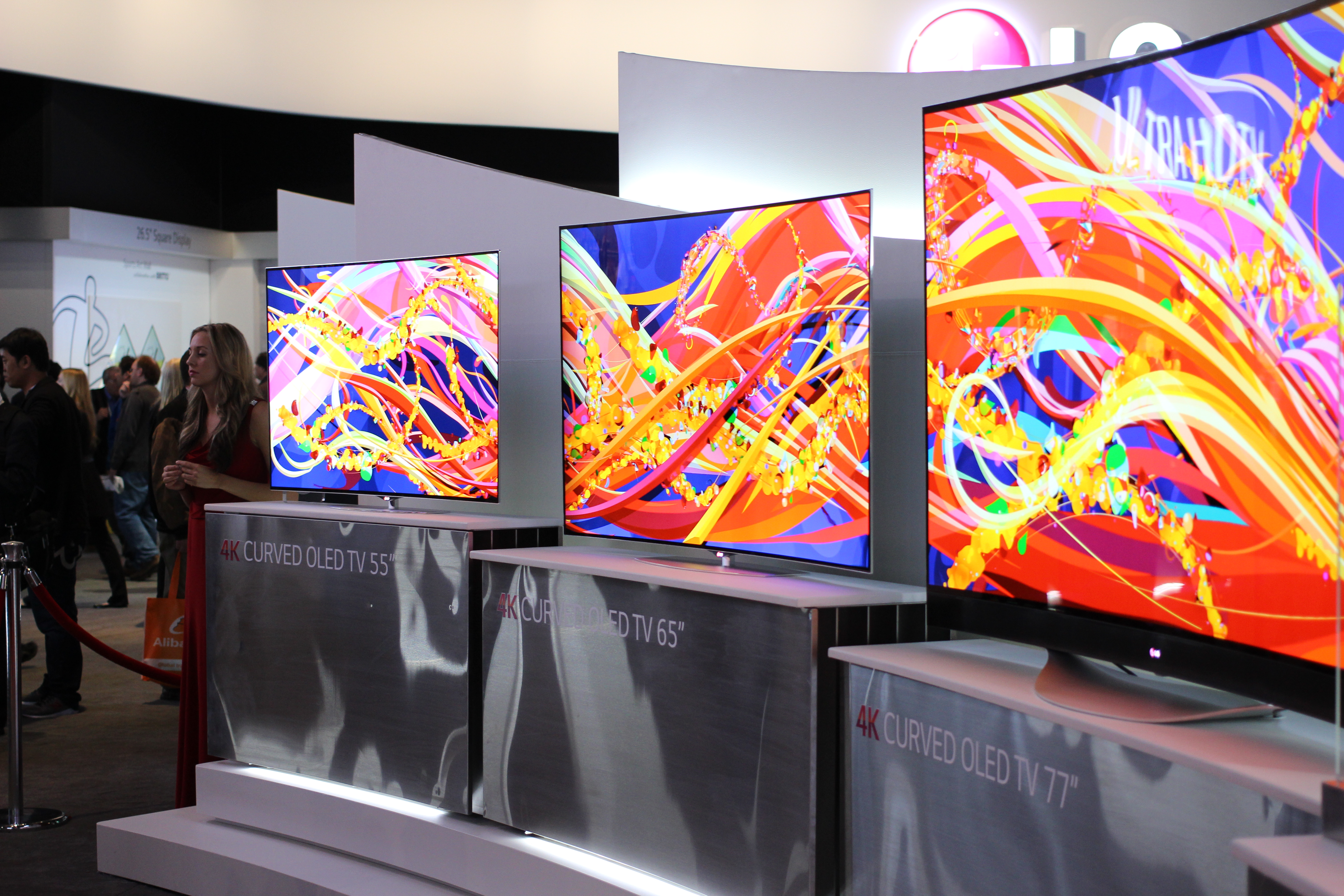
LG-made 4K curved OLED TV

In terms of industry share in South Korea's exports in 2015, electronics, including semiconductors, wireless communication devices, flat panel displays, computers, and home appliances, topped the list with 27.6 percent, followed by automobiles and auto parts with 13.5 percent.

LG ranked first in the OLED TV market in the first quarter of 2023, accounting for about 60% of the total shipments. The LG OLED TV is currently sold in more than 130 countries, making it the most widely available OLED TV in the world.

Many of the world's major electronics companies are based in South Korea, includes:

- Samsung Electronics
  - Samsung SDI
- LG Electronics
  - LG Display
  - LG Energy Solution
- SK Hynix
- Winia Electronics
- HD Hyundai Robotics

== See also ==
- Economy of South Korea
  - Economy of Seoul
- List of companies of South Korea
- South Korean robotics
- Science and technology in South Korea
- List of Korean inventions and discoveries
- International rankings of South Korea
