= K-Humanoid Alliance =

South Korean robotics research coalition

The K-Humanoid Alliance (Korean: K-휴머노이드 연합) is a humanoid robot research and development alliance of government, academic, and robot manufacturing companies, and was launched in April 2025. Major South Korean robot manufacturing companies, small and medium-sized companies related to parts, software companies, and universities are part of the alliance.

	General Committee		Supporting Institutions
AI Specialized Companies	Robot Manufacturers	Robot Parts Companies		Robot Demand Companies	University Talents	Experts

== Overview ==
As global investment in humanoid robots rapidly grew, South Korean government saw the need to consolidate the capabilities of the humanoid ecosystem and planned the alliance organization.

On April 10, 2025, the Ministry of Trade, Industry and Energy held the K-Humanoid Alliance launch ceremony at The Plaza Hotel in Seoul. Minister Ahn Duk-geun and Seoul National University President Yoo Hong-rim attended the event, and AI robot experts, the country's robot manufacturing companies such as Rainbow Robotics, and affiliates of large corporations such as LG Electronics and Doosan Robotics participated in the alliance.

== Plan ==
Researchers from SNU's AI Research Institute, Korea Advanced Institute of Science and Technology (KAIST), Yonsei University, and Korea University plan to collaborate to develop a common AI model that will be installed on robots by 2028. This is a plan to develop an AI module that corresponds to the brain of a robot and link it with a physical AI that physically implements it.

The alliance plans to develop a commercial humanoid robot that can lift objects weighing 20 kg or more, weighs less than 60 kg, has more than 50 joints, and moves at a speed of 2.5 m/s or faster by 2028 through its own development or through cooperative projects. Semiconductor and battery companies participated, and large-scale research and development projects for the development of AI semiconductors for on-device will be led by the MOTIE.

The MOTIE plans to launch a humanoid fund by 2025. In addition, by having 20 major domestic universities, including SNI and KAIST, participate in the alliance, it plans to foster excellent talent by providing undergraduate students with opportunities to directly and indirectly participate in major projects being carried out by the alliance.

== Participating organizations ==
Participating robotics companies include:

- Holiday Robotics
- Rainbow Robotics
- Doosan Robotics
- A Robot
- Wonik Robotics
- Werobotics
- Blue Robin
- Robros
- Angel Robotics
- Neuromeca
- Aideen Robotics
- Robotis
- HD Hyundai Robotics

Other participating companies include:

- Samsung SDI
- SK On
- LG Energy Solution
- DEEPX
- Tesolo
- Faraday Dynamics
- Komotech
- SBB Tech
- Samsung Display
- HD Hyundai Mipo
- Samsung Heavy Industries
- CJ Logistics
- POSCO E&C
- POSCO Holdings

== See also ==
- Science and technology in South Korea
- South Korean robotics
- HUBO
