= STSat-2C =

2013–2019 South Korean satellite

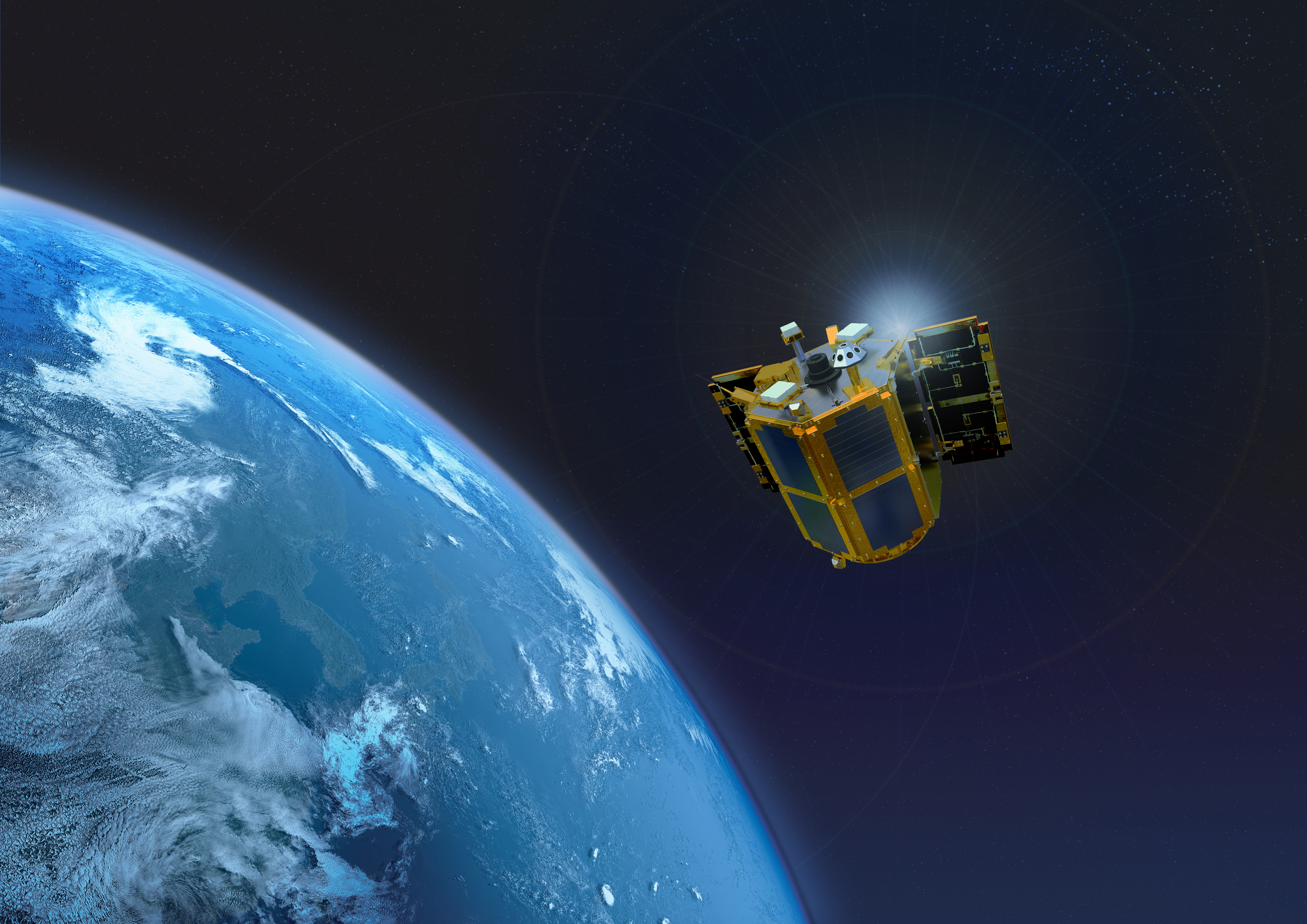
- An artist rendering of the STSat-2C satellite.
- Names: Science and Technology Satellite-2C; Naro Science Satellite
- Mission type: Technology, Science
- Operator: Korea Aerospace Research Institute (KARI)
- COSPAR ID: 2013-003A
- SATCAT no.: 39068
- Mission duration: Planned: 1 year Final: 6 years, 9 months and 13 days

Spacecraft properties
- Spacecraft type: STSat
- Bus: STSat-2A
- Manufacturer: Korea Aerospace Research Institute (KARI)
- Launch mass: 100 kg (220 lb)
- Dimensions: 62 cm x 70 cm x 90 cm
- Power: 160 watts

Start of mission
- Launch date: 30 January 2013, 07:00:00 UTC
- Rocket: Naro-1 # 3
- Launch site: Naro Space Center
- Contractor: Khrunichev / KARI

End of mission
- Disposal: Deorbited
- Decay date: 13 November 2019

Orbital parameters
- Reference system: Geocentric orbit
- Regime: Low Earth orbit
- Perigee altitude: 301 km (187 mi)
- Apogee altitude: 1,433 km (890 mi)
- Inclination: 80.26°
- Period: 102.14 minutes

Instruments
- Langmuir probe Laser Retroreflector Array (LRA); Space Radiation Effects Monitor (SREM); Reaction Wheel Assembly (RWA); IR Sensor (IRS); Femto second Laser Oscillator (FSO)

STSat-2C, or Science and Technology Satellite-2C, or Naro Science Satellite (ko:나로과학위성) was a South Korean satellite which was launched in 2013. It was operated by the Korea Aerospace Research Institute (KARI), and was intended to demonstrate technology for future spacecraft. The satellite had a mass of 100 kg (220 lb), and was expected to operate for less than a year.

== Instruments ==
STSAT-2C carries six payloads: the Laser Retroreflector Array (LRA) allows the spacecraft to be tracked with centimeter accuracy by satellite laser ranging (SLR) stations which make up the International Laser Ranging Service (ILRS). A Langmuir probe will be used to determine the electron temperature, electron density, and electric potential of plasma. The Space Radiation Effects Monitor (SREM) will be used for measurements and monitoring of the near-earth space environment. In addition, the Reaction Wheel Assembly (RWA), IR Sensor (IRS), and Femto second Laser Oscillator (FSO) are carried for the verification of new space technologies.

== Launch ==
STSat-2C was launched at 07:00:00 UTC on 30 January 2013, on the third flight of the Naro-1 launch vehicle, with a Russian first stage derived from the Angara and a South Korean second stage. Liftoff occurred from the Naro Space Center, and the launch vehicle successfully deployed the satellite into at 301 by 1,433 km (187 by 890 mi) low Earth orbit, with an orbital inclination of 80.26° and orbital period of 102.14 minutes. The launch marked the first successful flight of the Naro-1, which had previously failed to launch STSat-2A in 2009 and STSat-2B in 2010.
