= South Korean robotics =

South Korea is one of the leading countries in the use of industrial robots worldwide, with the International Federation of Robotics listing it as having the world's second most automated manufacturing industry in 2019. The country's robot industry has grown from ₩6.29 trillion in 2016 to ₩9.18 trillion in 2020.

The South Korean government plans to nearly quadruple the country's robot market to 20 trillion won from 2021 to help ease labor shortages in South Korea, which has one of the lowest birth rates in the world.

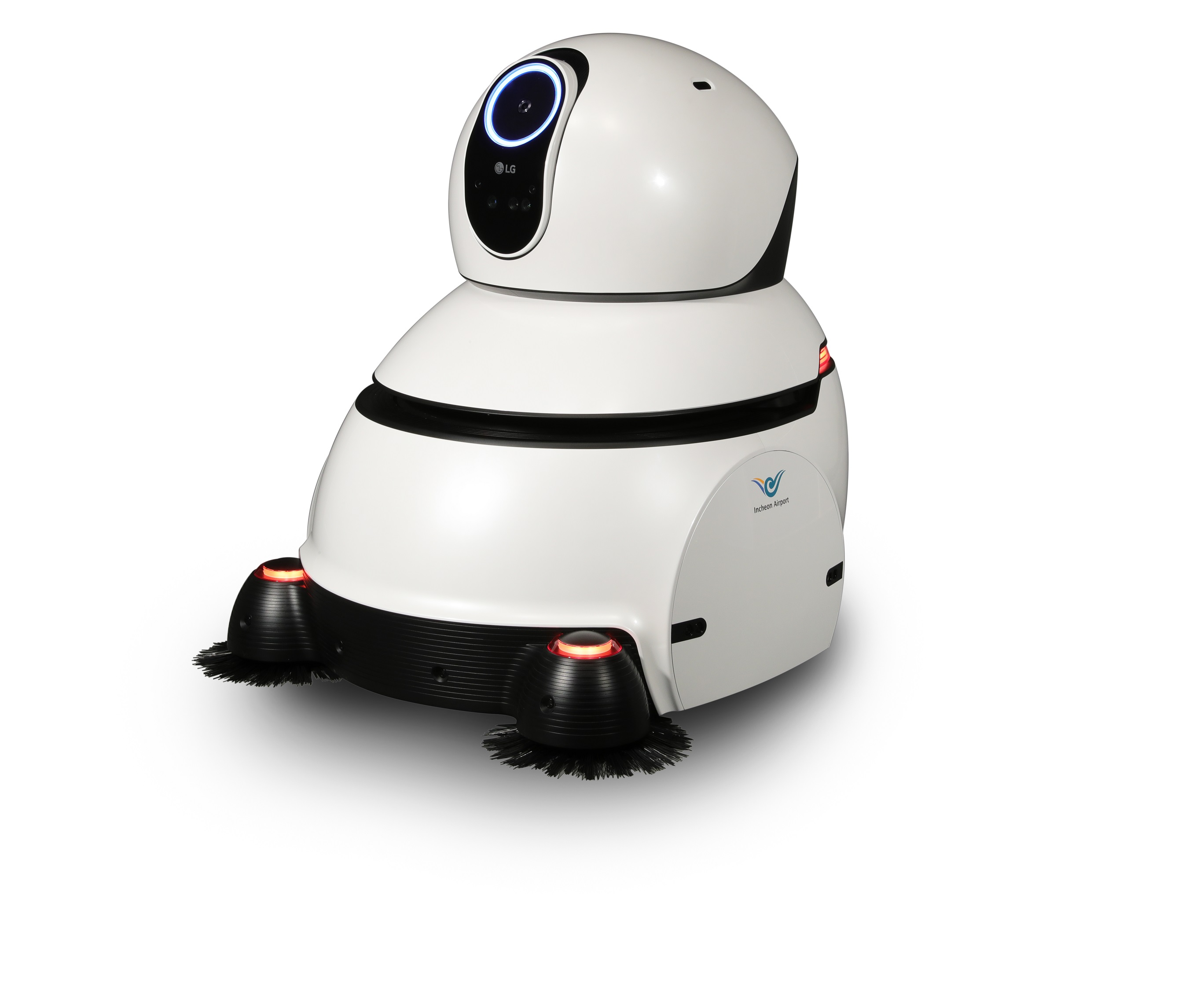
Airport cleaning robot by LG

== List of robots ==
=== HUBO ===
HUBO (Korean: 휴보) was developed by HUBO Laboratory, a humanoid robot laboratory at KAIST.

=== CRX10 ===
CRX10 (Korean: 시알엑스텐) is an autonomous mobile robot platform for education, training, and research. It was developed by CNRobot and released in May 2011.

=== EveR ===
EveR (Korean: 에버) is a female android series developed by a team of Korean scientists from the Korea Institute of Industrial Technology at the Korea University of Science and Technology. It was unveiled to the public in 2003.

=== Others ===
- Genibo (Korean: 제니보)
- MAHRU & AHRA (Korean: 마루/아라)
- Musa (Korean: 무사)
- Raptor (Korean: 랩터)
- SEROPI (Korean: 세로피)

== South Korean robotics companies ==
=== General robotics ===
- LG Electronics
- Samsung Electronics

=== Industrial robotics ===
- HD Hyundai Robotics
- Hyundai WIA
- Doosan Robotics
- Hanwha Robotics
- Higen Motor

== See also ==
- Economy of South Korea
- Manufacturing in South Korea
- Science and technology in South Korea
- K-Humanoid Alliance
