= STSat-2A =

Failed South Korean satellite

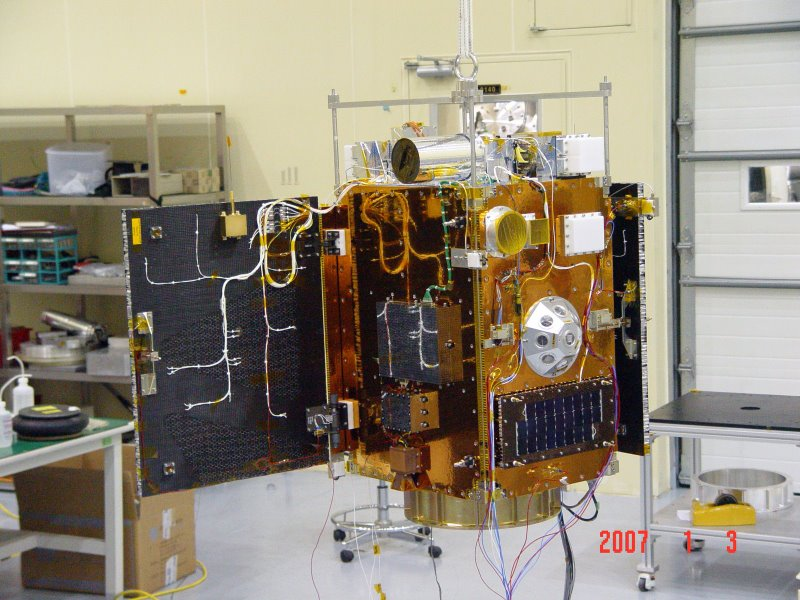
- Names: Science and Technology Satellite-2A
- Mission type: Technology, Science
- Operator: KAIST Satellite Technology Research Center (SaTReC)
- Mission duration: 2 years (planned); Failed to orbit

Spacecraft properties
- Spacecraft type: STSat
- Bus: STSat-1
- Manufacturer: KAIST Satellite Technology Research Center (SaTReC)
- Launch mass: 100 kg (220 lb)
- Dimensions: 62 cm x 70 cm x 90 cm
- Power: 160 watts

Start of mission
- Launch date: 25 August 2009, 08:00:33 UTC
- Rocket: Naro-1 # 1
- Launch site: Naro Space Center
- Contractor: Khrunichev / KARI

End of mission
- Last contact: Failed to orbit

Orbital parameters
- Reference system: Geocentric orbit (planned)
- Regime: Low Earth orbit
- Perigee altitude: 300 km (190 mi)
- Apogee altitude: 1,500 km (930 mi)
- Inclination: 80.0°
- Period: 103.0 minutes

Instruments
- Dual-channel Radiometers for Earth and Atmosphere Monitoring (DREAM); Laser Retroreflector Array (LRA); Dual Head Star Tracker (DHST); Pulsed Plasma Thruster (PPT); Fine Digital Sun Sensor (FDSS)

STSat-2A (Science and Technology Satellite-2A) was a satellite launched by the Korea Aerospace Research Institute (KARI), the national space agency of South Korea, from the Naro Space Center in Goheung County, South Jeolla using the Naro-1 (KSLV-1) launch vehicle.

== Spacecraft ==
The KAIST Satellite Technology Research Center (SaTReC) developed STSat-2A as a Sun observation, satellite laser ranging and engineering and technology demonstration sponsored by the Ministry of Science and Technology. It was expected to be operational for about two years, and was scheduled to be launched between 2005 and 2007. The Laser Retroreflector Array (LRA) instrument was intended to measure the orbit of STSAT-2A, in order to investigate variations in its orbit.

It was a follow-up to STSat-1, which was launched using a Kosmos-3M rocket on 27 September 2003. Originally a Dual-channel Radiometers for Earth and Atmosphere Monitoring (DREAM) microwave radiometer was intended as the principal payload of STSat-2A for an expected launch in 2007. The Laser Retroreflector Array (LRA) was described as an early expected payload for STSat-2A which would consist of nine retroreflectors in a mechanical casing.

== Mission ==
STSat-2A has three missions: the indigenous research and development to place a satellite into low Earth orbit, development of indigenous spacecraft, and the ability to develop scientific payloads.

== Launch ==
STSat-2A was launched on the maiden flight of the Naro-1 launch vehicle, which lifted off the Naro Space Center, on the southern coast of South Korea at 08:00:33 UTC on 25 August 2009. The launch failed to place STSat-2A into orbit after half of the payload fairing failed to separate. This resulted in the second stage being too heavy to reach orbit, and it fell back to Earth along with the satellite. A second satellite, STSat-2B, was launched on 10 June 2010, but the launch vehicle failed again.

== See also ==
- Arirang-2 (KOMPSAT-2)
