= STSat-2B =

Failed South Korean satellite

- Names: Science and Technology Satellite-2B
- Mission type: Technology, Science
- Operator: Korea Aerospace Research Institute (KARI)
- Mission duration: 2 years (planned); Failed to orbit

Spacecraft properties
- Spacecraft type: STSat
- Bus: STSat-2A
- Manufacturer: KAIST Satellite Technology Research Center (SaTReC)
- Launch mass: 100 kg (220 lb)
- Dimensions: 62 cm x 70 cm x 90 cm
- Power: 160 watts

Start of mission
- Launch date: 10 June 2010, 08:01 UTC
- Rocket: Naro-1 # 2
- Launch site: Naro Space Center
- Contractor: Khrunichev / KARI

End of mission
- Last contact: Failed to orbit

Orbital parameters
- Reference system: Geocentric orbit
- Regime: Low Earth (planned)
- Perigee altitude: 300 km (190 mi)
- Apogee altitude: 1,500 km (930 mi)
- Inclination: 80.0°
- Period: 103.0 minutes

Instruments
- Dual-channel Radiometers for Earth and Atmosphere Monitoring (DREAM); Laser Retroreflector Array (LRA); Dual Head Star Tracker (DHST); Pulsed Plasma Thruster (PPT); Fine Digital Sun Sensor (FDSS)

STSat-2B, or Science and Technology Satellite-2B, was a South Korean satellite which was lost in the failure of the second flight of the Naro-1 launch vehicle. It was to have been operated by the Korea Aerospace Research Institute (KARI), and was intended to demonstrate technology for future spacecraft. The satellite had a mass of 100 kg (220 lb), and was expected to operate for at least two years.

STSat-2B was originally intended to operate alongside a second spacecraft, STSat-2A; however STSat-2A was lost in 2009 after the payload fairing of its carrier rocket failed to separate, leaving the rocket unable to achieve orbit.

== Instruments ==
The primary instrument aboard STSat-2B was the Dual-channel Radiometer for Earth and Atmosphere Monitoring, or DREAM, which would have measured the brightness temperature of the Earth at 23.8 GHz and 37 GHz. The secondary payload, the Laser Retroreflector Array (LRA) was to have been used for the Satellite laser ranging experiment, which was intended to determine the parameters of the satellite's orbit with a greater degree of precision. Data collected by the secondary payload would have been used to calibrate DREAM, to conduct geodetic research, and to evaluate the performance of the launch vehicle. Due to lower manufacturing tolerance, the retroreflectors on STSat-2B would have provided greater precision than those intended on STSat-2A.

A series of technological experiments were also to have been conducted; investigating attitude control systems, and testing pulsed plasma thrusters, star trackers, a Sun sensor, as well as an experimental onboard computer, and data relay at rates of up to 10 megabits per second.

== Launch ==
STSat-2B was launched by a Naro-1 launch vehicle, flying from the Naro Space Center. The launch was the second flight of the Naro-1, which consisted of a modified Angara first stage manufactured by Khrunichev, and a South Korean solid-fuelled upper stage. The previous Naro-1 launch was that of STSat-2A, which occurred in August 2009 and ended in failure.

The launch was initially scheduled to occur on 9 June 2010, during a two-hour launch window opening at 07:30 UTC (16:30 local time). Further launch attempts were available at the same time each day until 19 June 2010. The launch attempt on 9 June 2010 was scrubbed after the launch pad's fire suppression system activated for no apparent reason.

Following the scrub, the launch was rescheduled for the next day, and took place at 08:01 UTC (17:01 local time) on 10 June 2010. During the first stage burn, around 137 seconds into the flight, contact with the rocket was lost. South Korean science minister Ahn Byung-man later told reporters that the rocket was believed to have exploded. If the launch had been successful, STSat-2B would have been deployed into an orbit with a perigee of 300 km (190 mi), an apogee of 1,500 km (930 mi), and around 80.0° of inclination.
