= Science and technology in South Korea =

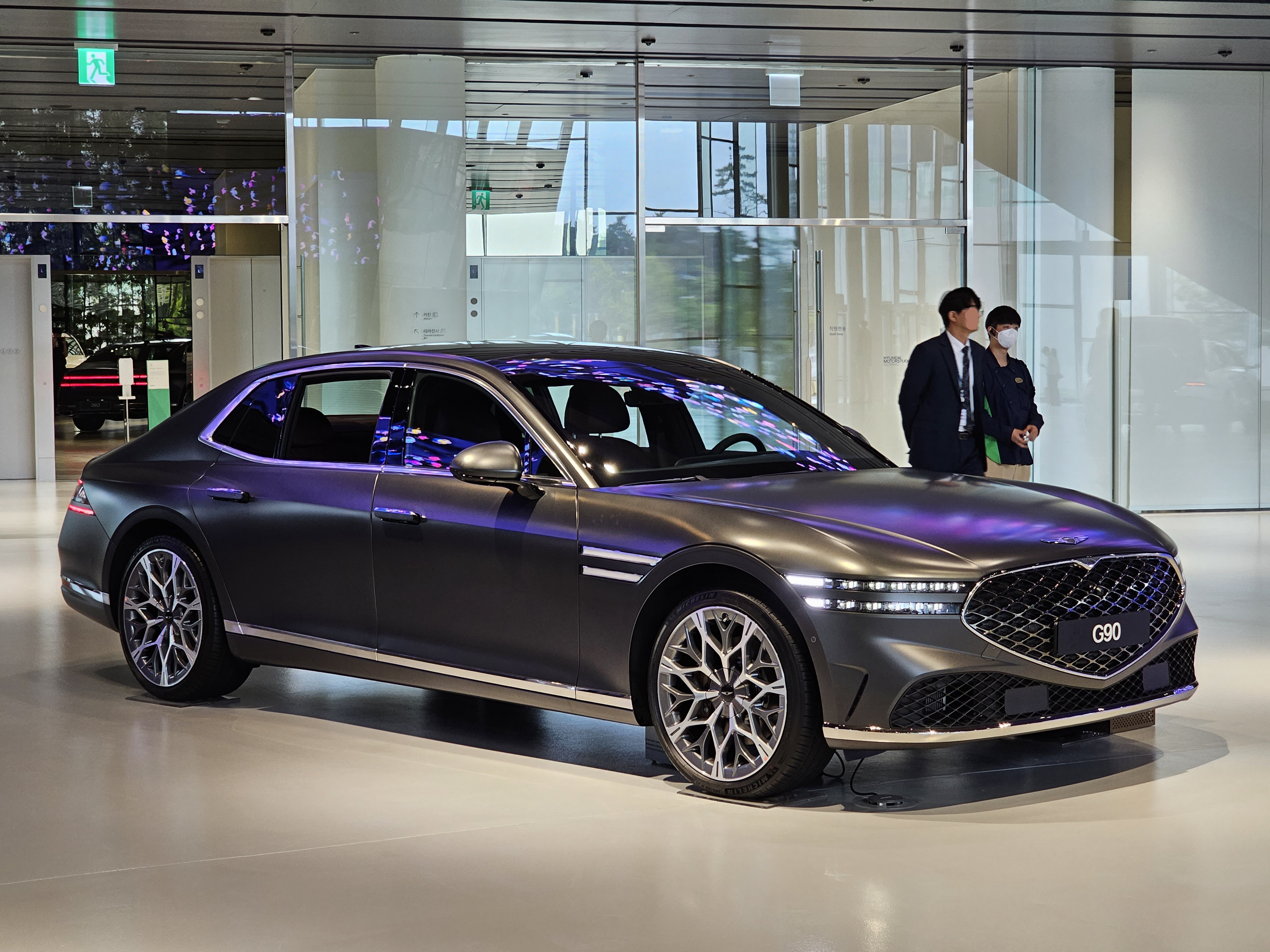
Hyundai Motor Group, one of the top three car brands in the world

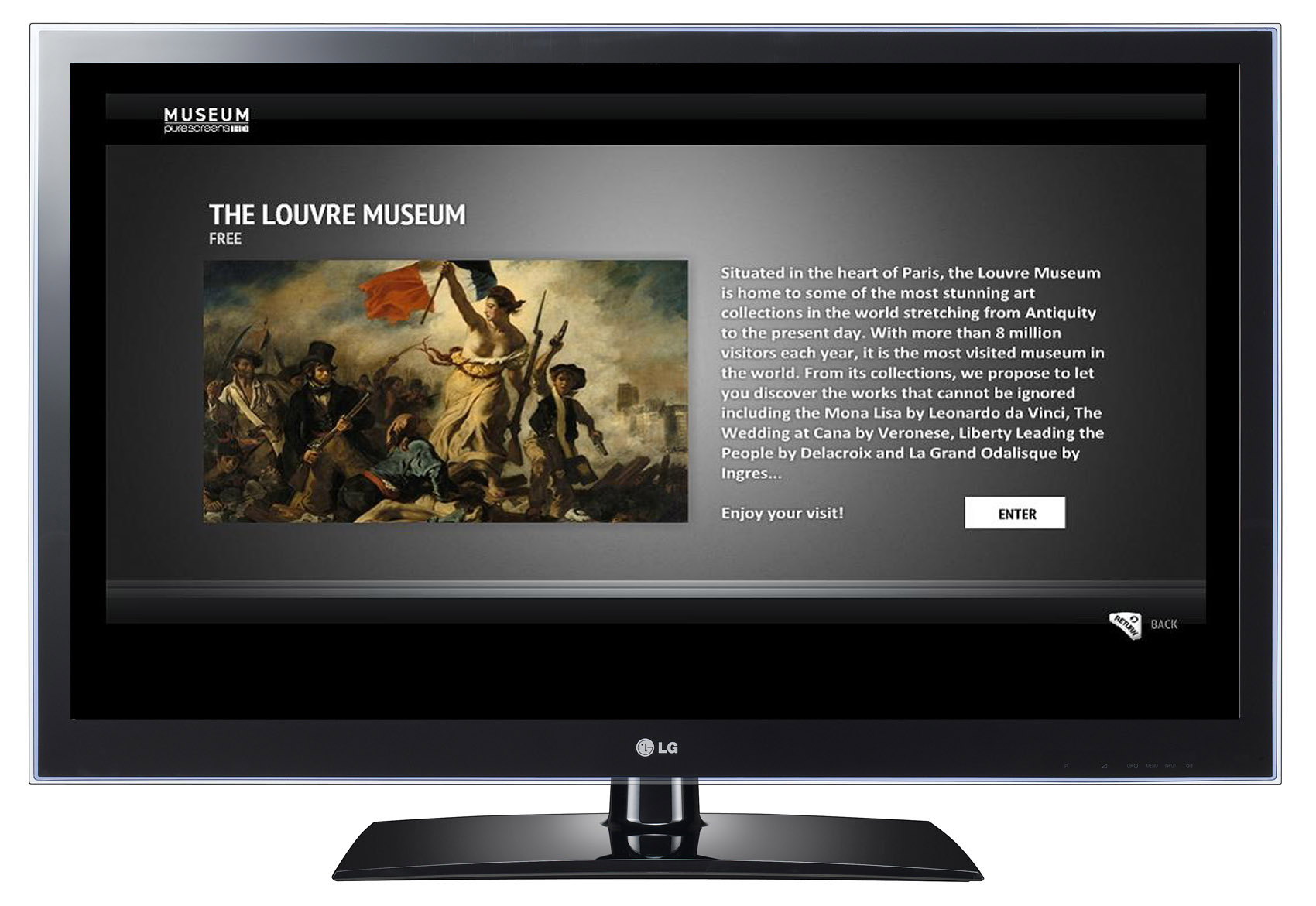
LG Electronics, the No. 1 TV market player in the world

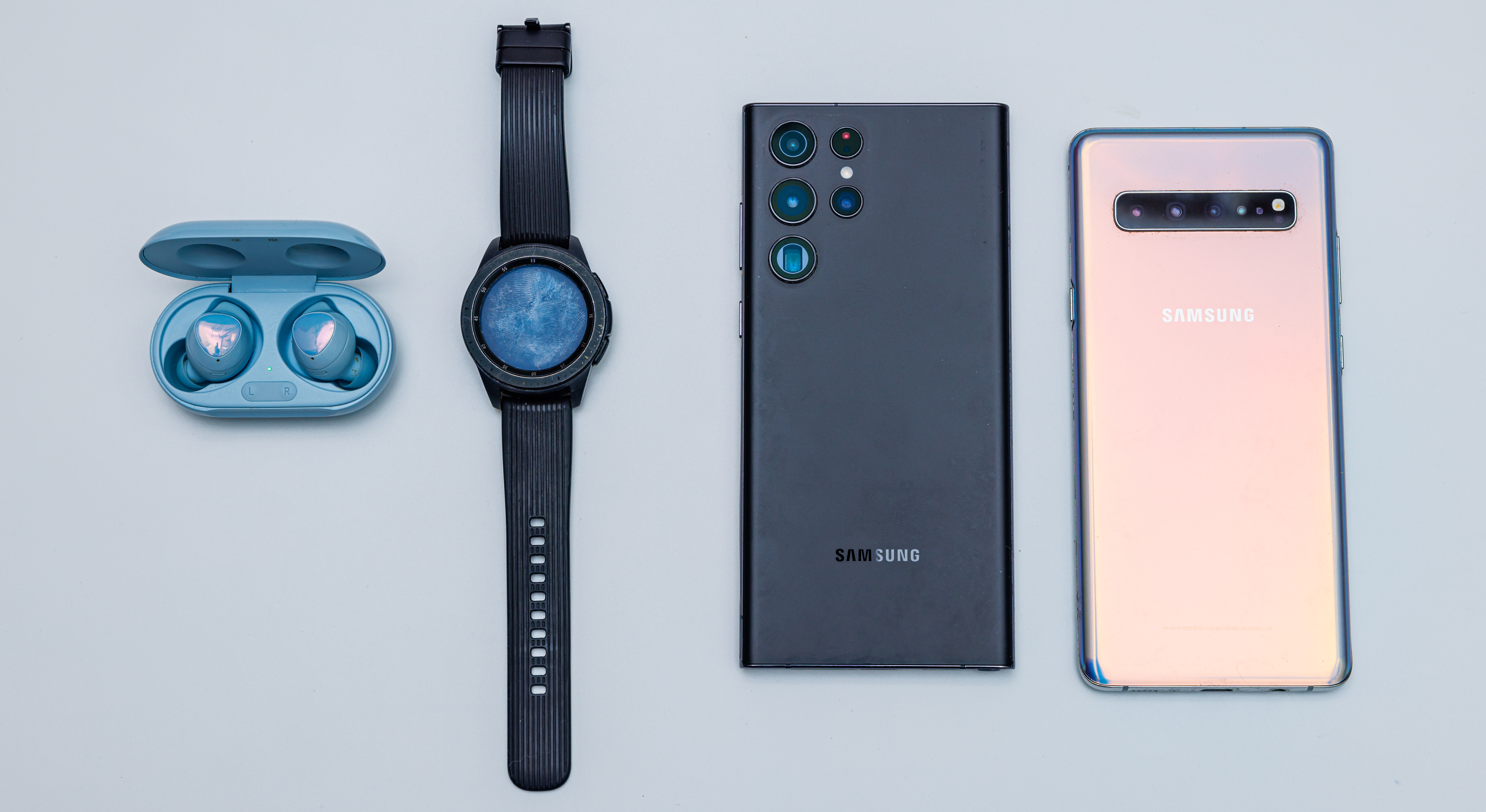
Samsung Electronics, the world's No. 1 smartphone market share as of 2022

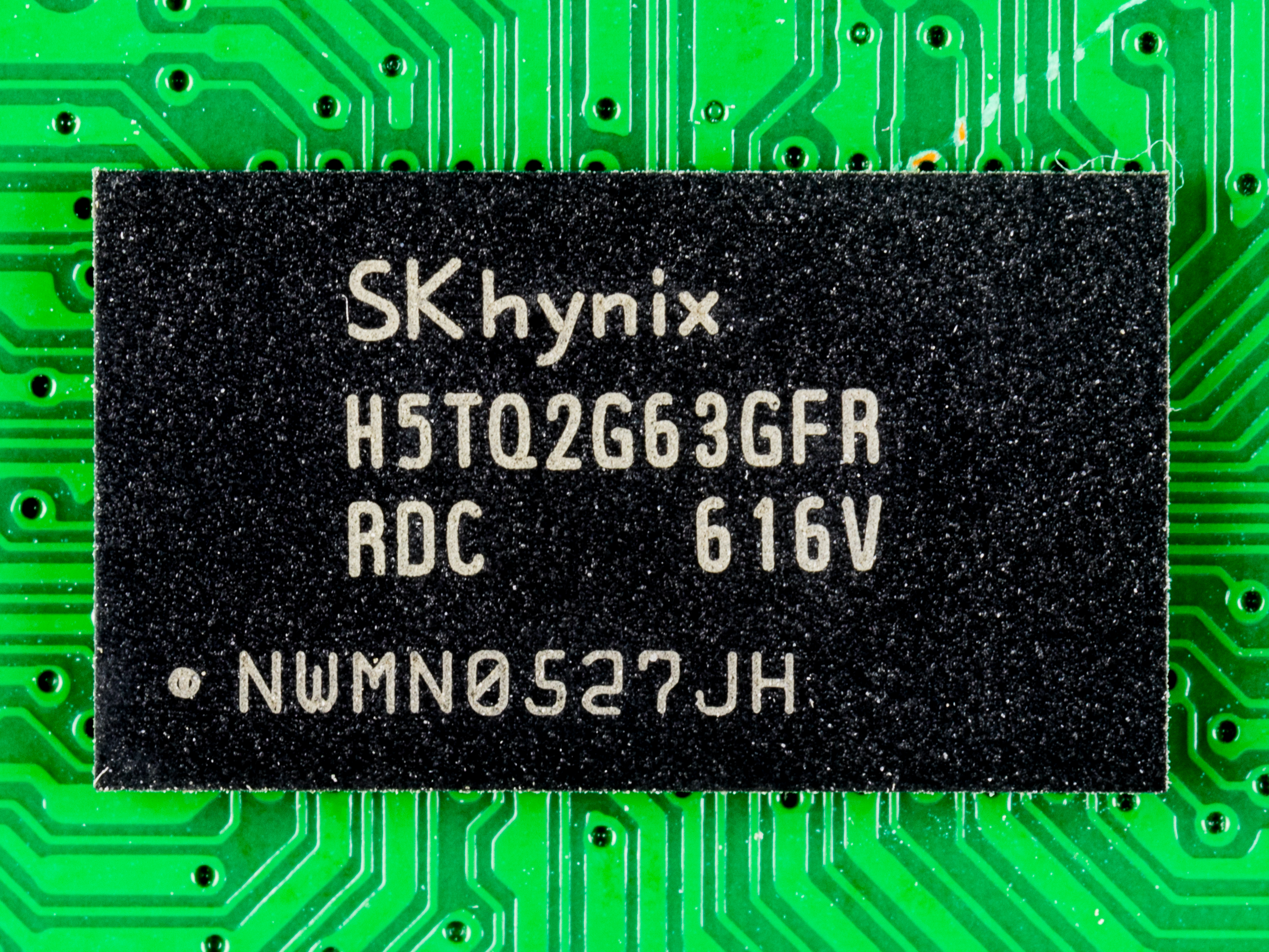
SK Hynix, the world's fourth-largest chipmaker in sales as of 2023

Science and technology in South Korea has advanced throughout the decades. The advancement of science and technology has become an integral part of economic planning in South Korea. Fast-growing industries have created a massive demand for new and more advanced technologies. Additionally, Korean engineers and scientists propose that the advancement of science and technology in partnership with North Korea could help facilitate the peaceful reunification of North and South Korea.

In the pursuit of advancement, South Korea has taken a centralized approach. South Korea was ranked 4th in the Global Innovation Index in 2025, and remained in the same position in the index of 2026. As of 2022, South Korea has the sixth largest private investment in artificial intelligence.

== Korean Federation of Science and Technology Societies (KOFST) ==
The Korean Federation of Science and Technology Societies was established in 1966 and consists of 780 organizations as of 2012. The goals of the KOFST are to make the sharing of technology and research data between these societies easier and to encourage and facilitate the cooperation of Pacific Rim countries.

== Aerospace engineering ==
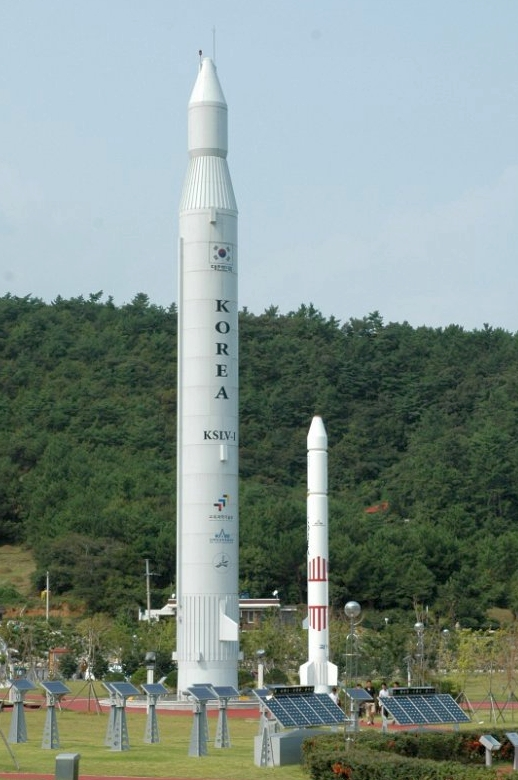
A replica of the Naro-1

South Korea has sent up 10 satellites from 1992, all using foreign rockets and overseas launch pads, notably Arirang-1 in 1999, and Arirang-2 in 2006 as part of its space partnership with Russia. Arirang-1 was lost in space in 2008, after nine years in service.

In April 2008, Yi So-yeon became the first Korean to fly in space, aboard the Russian Soyuz TMA-12.

In June 2009, the first spaceport of South Korea, Naro Space Center, was completed at Goheung, South Jeolla Province. The launch of Naro-1 in August 2009 resulted in a failure. The second attempt in June 2010 was also unsuccessful. However, the third launch of the Naro 1 in January 2013 was successful. The government plans to develop Naro-2 by the year 2018.

Companies involved in the aerospace and defense markets of South Korea are primarily large multinational companies. These large companies have been further strengthened by a push towards consolidation in the market. This results in a difficulty for newer companies to enter the South Korean aerospace market.

With the final successful launch of the Nuri, which South Korea launched for the third time in 2023, South Korea has become the seventh country in the world to have a medium-sized liquid-propellant rocket engine over 75 tons.

Two years after South Korea officially expressed its intention to join Horizon Europe in 2022, South Korea and the European Union signed a Horizon Europe agreement, which is expected to allow Korea to participate in that from 2025.

National Aerospace Industrial Complex is being built in South Gyeongsang Province, bringing together aerospace-related companies and agencies, with the goal of completion in June 2025.

== Defense technology ==
Due to the growing perceived threat of North Korea, South Korea is increasing defense spending. In 2019, South Korea is expected to increase spending by the largest amount in 11 years.

Hanwha Techwin is a leading South Korean company manufacturing defense products, security devices, engines, digital solutions, and integrated control systems in South Korea. Hanwha Techwin produces video recorders, surveillance software, access control products, and intelligent machinery and solutions.

== Biotechnology ==
Since the 1980s, the South Korean government has invested in the development of a domestic biotechnology industry, and the sector is projected to grow to $6.5 billion by 2010. The medical sector accounts for a large part of the production, including production of hepatitis vaccines and antibiotics.

Recently, research and development in genetics and cloning has received increasing attention, with the first successful cloning of a dog, Snuppy (in 2005), and the cloning of two females of an endangered species of wolves by the Seoul National University in 2007.

The rapid growth of the industry has resulted in significant voids in regulation of ethics, as was highlighted by the scientific misconduct case involving Hwang Woo-Suk.

In January 2025, the country launched the National Bio Committee, an advisory committee directly under the president.

== Robotics ==
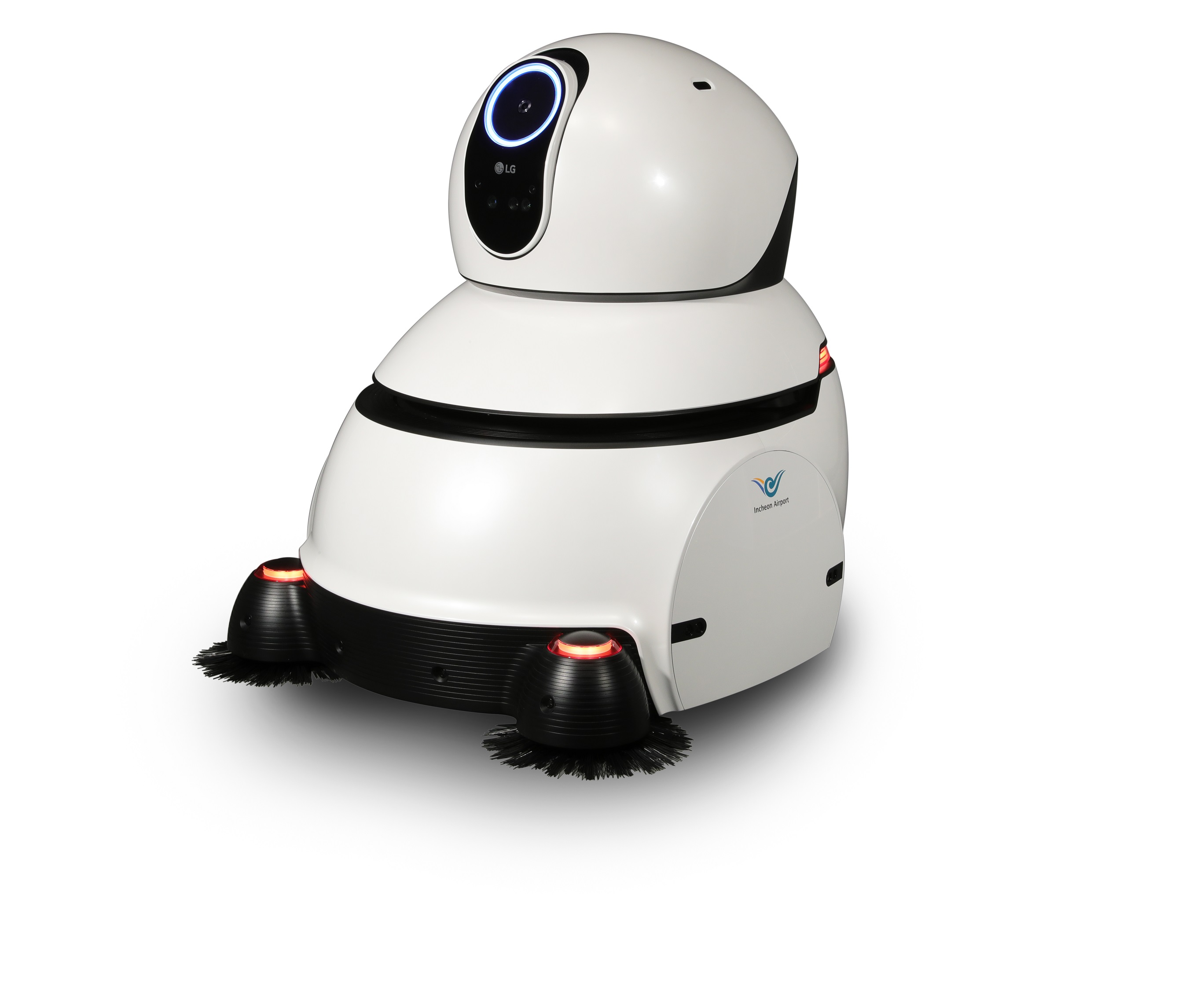
Airport cleaning robot by LG

Robotics has been included in the list of main national R&D projects in South Korea since 2003. In 2009, the government announced plans to build robot-themed parks in Incheon and Masan with a mix of public and private funding.

In 2005, Korea Advanced Institute of Science and Technology (KAIST) developed the world's second walking humanoid robot, HUBO. A team in the Korea Institute of Industrial Technology developed the first South Korean android, EveR-1 in May 2006. EveR-1 has been succeeded by more complex models with improved movement and vision.

Plans of creating English-teaching robot assistants to compensate for the shortage of teachers were announced in February 2010, with the robots being deployed to most preschools and kindergartens by 2013. Robotics are also incorporated in the entertainment sector as well; the Korean Robot Game Festival has been held every year since 2004 to promote science and robot technology.

== International Science Olympiads ==
Performance of South Korean students in International Science Olympiads

- South Korea's rank based on number of Gold Medals in last 10 years (2014–2023):
  - Physics - 2-nd
  - Chemistry - 6-th
  - Biology - 6-th
  - Mathematics - 3-rd

== Cooperation with other countries ==
=== European Union ===
South Korea is the first country in Asia to participate in Horizon Europe, the world's largest multilateral research and innovation program.

== See also ==
- Automotive industry in South Korea
- Economy of South Korea
- Korea Aerospace Research Institute
- List of Korean inventions and discoveries
- Manufacturing in South Korea
