= STSat-1 =

South Korean satellite launched in 2003

- Names: Science and Technology Satellite-1; KAISTSat-4; Korea Advanced Institute of Science and Technology Satellite-4
- Mission type: Technology, Astrophysics
- Operator: KAIST Satellite Technology Research Center (SaTReC)
- COSPAR ID: 2003-042G
- SATCAT no.: 27945
- Mission duration: 2 years (planned)

Spacecraft properties
- Spacecraft type: STSat
- Bus: STSat-1
- Manufacturer: KAIST Satellite Technology Research Center (SaTReC)
- Launch mass: 106 kg (234 lb)
- Dimensions: 66 cm x 60 cm x 80 cm
- Power: 150 watts

Start of mission
- Launch date: 27 September 2003, 06:11:44 UTC
- Rocket: Kosmos-3M (11K65M)
- Launch site: Plesetsk, Site 132/1
- Contractor: Yuzhnoye / NPO Polyot

Orbital parameters
- Reference system: Geocentric orbit
- Regime: Sun-synchronous orbit
- Perigee altitude: 675 km (419 mi)
- Apogee altitude: 695 km (432 mi)
- Inclination: 98.20°
- Period: 98.50 minutes

Instruments
- Far-ultraviolet Imaging Spectrograph (FIMS); Space Physics Package (SPP); Data Collection System (DCS)

The STSat-1 (Science and Technology Satellite-1), formerly known as KAISTSat-4 (Korea Advanced Institute of Science and Technology Satellite-4), is an ultraviolet telescope in a satellite. It is funded by the Korea Aerospace Research Institute (KARI), and was launched on 27 September 2003, from Plesetsk Cosmodrome by a Kosmos-3M launch vehicle, into an Earth orbit with a height between 675 and 695 km.

STSat-1 is a low-cost KAIST / KAIST Satellite Technology Research Center (SaTReC) satellite technology demonstration mission, funded by the Ministry of Science and Technology (MOST) of South Korea, a follow-up mission in the KITSAT program. STSat-1 is a South Korean astrophysical satellite that was launched by a Kosmos 3M launch vehicle from Plesetsk at 06:11:44 UTC on 27 September 2003. The 106 kg satellite carries a special UV imaging spectrograph to monitor gas clouds in the Galaxy. It will complete a full sky mapping in about a year, by scanning a one-degree strip every day. Additionally, it may also aim the telescope downward to image auroral displays.
