= Rainbow Robotics =

South Korean robotics company

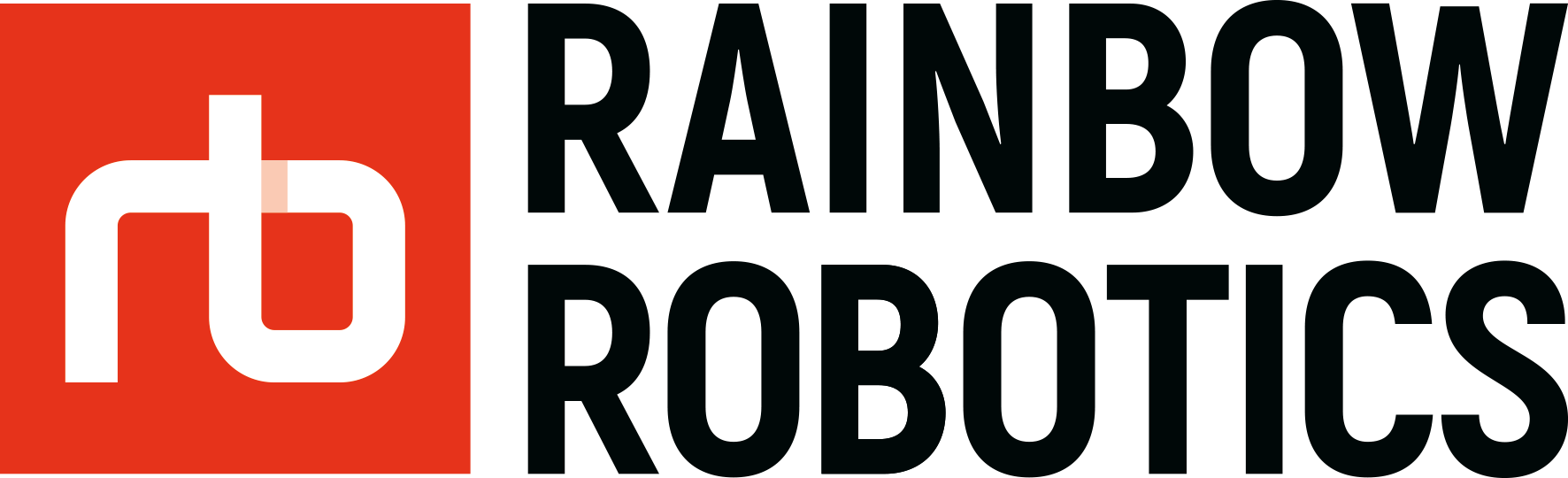
- Native name: 레인보우로보틱스
- Company type: Public
- Traded as: KRX: 277810
- Industry: Robotics
- Founded: 10 February 2011; 15 years ago
- Headquarters: Yuseong District, Daejeon, South Korea
- Products: Cobot, humanoid robot
- Website: www.rainbow-robotics.com

Rainbow Robotics (Korean: 레인보우로보틱스) is a South Korean robotics company founded in 2011 by Professor Oh Jun-ho of the HUBO Lab at the KAIST.

== History ==
Oh Jun-ho, Professor of KAIST, founded Rainbow in 2011 with students at the KAIST Humanoid Robot Research Center. The company produced 15 units of the mass-produced model of HUBO-2, HUBO-2 Plus, by 2012, exporting four units to domestic humanoid research teams and 11 units to overseas research teams in the United States, Japan, Singapore, and China. Rainbow Robotics was acquired by Samsung Electronics in March 2025.

== Location ==
The headquarters is located in the Daedeok Innopolis in Yuseong District, Daejeon. In 2023, a local corporation with a dedicated collaborative robot sales and customer management organization was established in Schaumburg, Illinois, and a branch office was subsequently established in the United States.

== Product ==
The flagship product, HUBO, is the first bipedal humanoid robot developed by KAIST. DDRC-HUBO, an exoskeleton-type disaster relief robot, is the winning model in the 2015 DARPA Robotics Challenge. It has an original actuator cooling system and a wheeled driving mode. HUBO-2 is the world's first commercialized humanoid robot platform and is a humanoid robot with a size similar to an actual person. It applies a cable-driven adaptive five-finger hand, and the fingers can close according to the shape of the object, allowing it to grasp objects of various shapes.

Other products include astronomy mount system, media service robot, medical laser robot toning system, cocktail and barista robot, cobot, mobile robot, and quadruped robot.

== See also ==
- Humanoid robot
- HUBO
