= KARI KSR-1 =

South Korean sounding rocket

KSR-I (Korean Sounding Rocket-I) is a South Korean sounding rocket designed by KARI.

== Spec ==
- Payload: 150 kg
- Apogee: 75 km
- Thrust: 86 kN
- Weight: 1200 kg
- Diameter: 0.42 m
- Length: 6.7 m
- Launch: June 4, 1993 (1st)/September 1, 1993 (2nd)

== See also ==
- KARI KSR-2
- KARI KSR-3
- KSLV-I
- KSLV-II
