= KSR-2 (sounding rocket) =

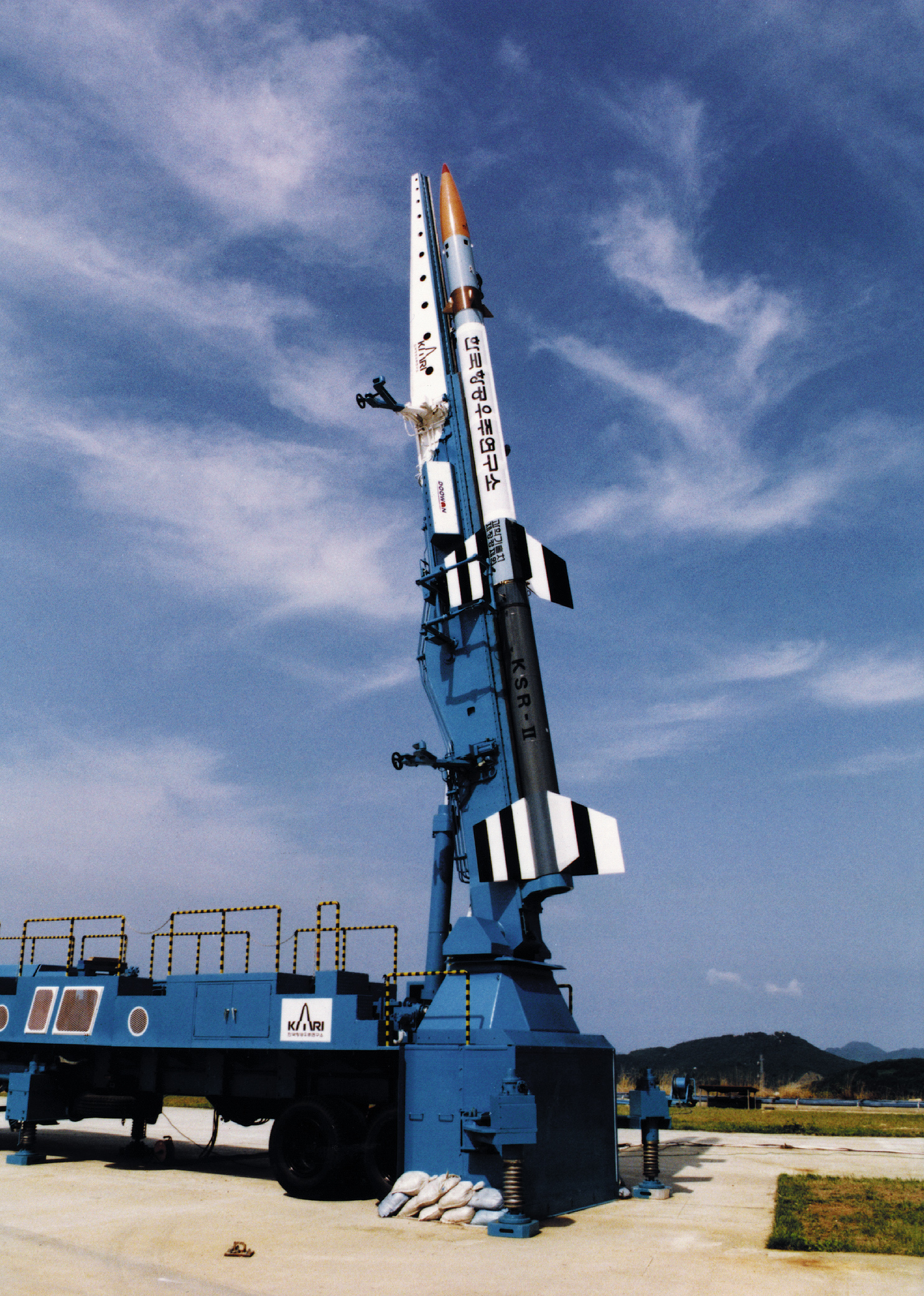
KSR-II at a launchpad

KSR-2 (Korean Sounding Rocket-2) is a South Korean sounding rocket designed by KARI.

== Spec ==
- Payload: 150 kg
- Apogee: 160 km
- Thrust: 86 kN
- Weight: 2000 kg
- Diameter: 0.42 m
- Length: 11.04 m
- Launch: July 9, 1997 (1st)/June 11, 1998 (2nd)

== See also ==
- KARI KSR-1
- KARI KSR-3
- KSLV-I
- KSLV-II

== General references ==
- KSR-II on Encyclopedia Astronautica
