= KARI KSR-3 =

South Korean rocket

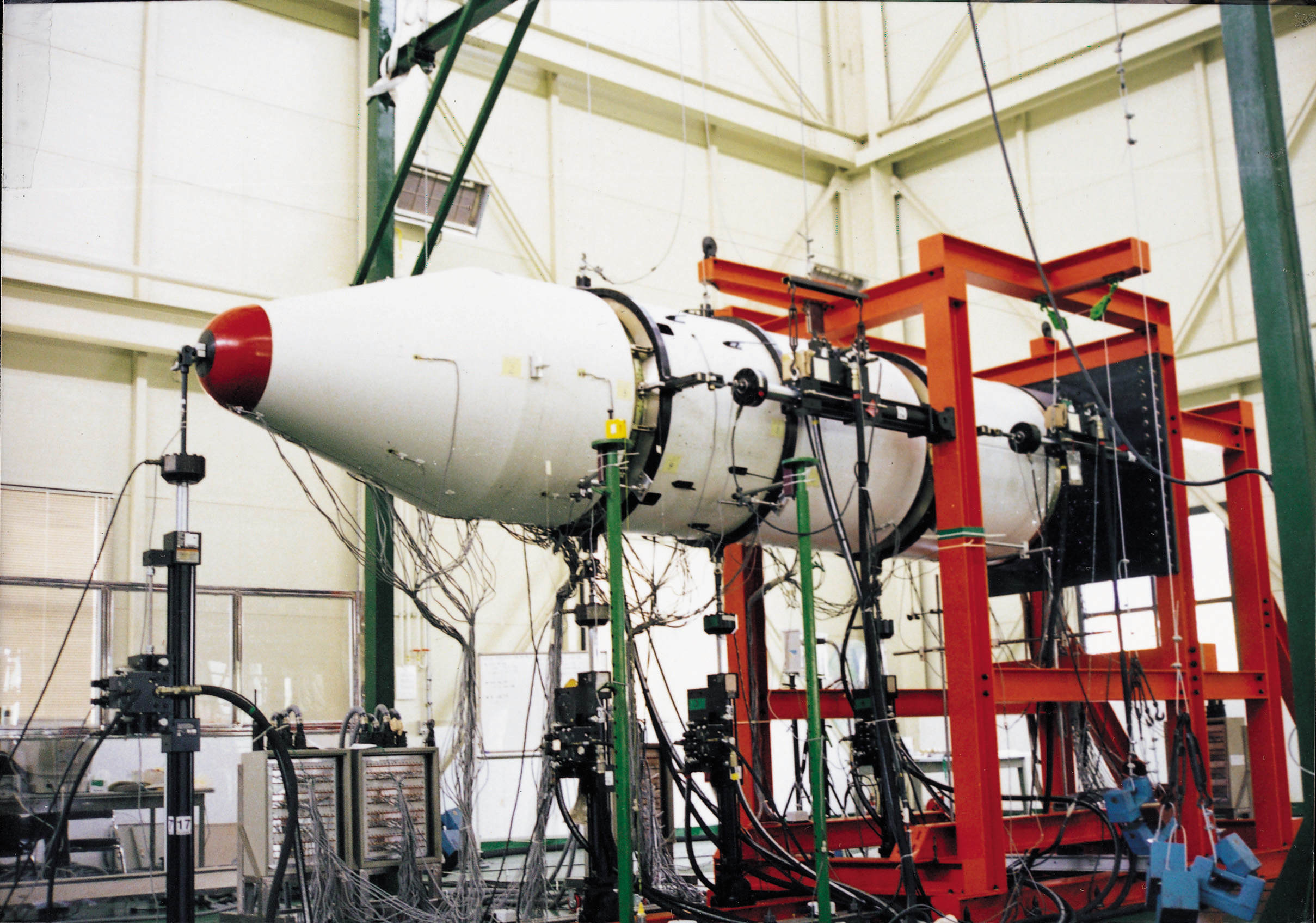
- KSR-3
- Country of origin: South Korea
- Date: 2002
- Designer: Korea Aerospace Research Institute

Liquid-fuel engine

KSR-3 or KSR-III (Korean Sounding Rocket-3) is a South Korean liquid sounding rocket designed by Korea Aerospace Research Institute. It was launched successfully on November 28, 2002, for scientific surveillance purposes. The first test flight of KSR-III was carried out by the KARI rocketry team from Anheung Proving Ground, reaching an altitude of 42.7 km (26.5 mi) and flying over 84 km (52 mi).

== Spec ==
- Payload: 150 kg
- Apogee: 42.7 km
- Range: 79 km
- Thrust: 13 t
- Weight: 6.1 t
- Diameter: 0.42 m
- Length: 13.5 m
- Burn time: 53 sec
- Launch: November 28, 2002

== See also ==
- KSLV-I
- KSLV-II
- KARI KSR-1
- KARI KSR-2
