= Osong Life Science Complex =

Industrial complex in Cheongju, South Korea

Osong Life Science Complex (Korean: 오송생명과학단지) is a bioscience complex established in 2010 in Cheongju, South Chungcheong Province, South Korea. It is the first complex in the country where companies, universities, research institutes, and national organizations are linked to support all processes from human resource development and R&D, licensing and approval, manufacturing, and sales. It was promoted by the South Korean government to foster the healthcare and Biotechnology fields as national strategic projects.

The Complex is responsible for biopharmaceutical research and development, Osong Cosmetics Industrial Complex is responsible for the preparation of fusion biomaterials, and Osong Bio Industrial Complex is responsible for the manufacturing of biopharmaceutical small and medium-sized businesses.

A third complex is currently being planned, which will include additional capabilities including validation of biopharmaceutical material components.

== History ==
The overall life science complex development project began in 1997 and was completed in 2010. The relocation of six national organizations, including the Ministry of Food and Drug Safety and the Korea Disease Control and Prevention Agency, began in 2007 and was completed in 2010 when the construction project was completed. Research support facilities such as the National Human Resources Development Bank, preclinical and clinical facilities, etc., which will support corporate R&D and industrialization, were attracted or built. In addition, Osong station on the KTX Gyeongbu high-speed Line was built. Nearby, there are many apartment complexes, single-family homes, elementary, middle, and high schools, and public facilities.

In 2009, It was designated as an Advanced Medical Complex. The Osong Advanced Medical Complex Promotion Committee expressed its expectations that this complex will soon contribute to raising the level of the country's healthcare industry to the world-class level. In addition, synergy effects with various national organizations, universities, and research institutes located in this complex, spillover effects on the medical industry and other industries, and job creation are expected.

== First and Second Complex ==
The six national government agencies are located in Osong Health and Medical Administration Town, in Heungdeok-gu, Cheongju, North Chungcheong Province: the Ministry of Food and Drug Safety, the Korea National Institute of Health, the Korea Disease Control and Prevention Agency, the Korea Health Industry Development Institute, the Korea Human Resource Institute for Health and Welfare, and the National Institute of Food and Drug Safety Evaluation.

== Third Complex ==
The third complex will be built in Osong-eup, Heungdeok-gu, and has a single area of approximately 4,139,753 m^{2} (44,559,930 sq ft), making it the second-largest national industrial complex in North Chungcheong Province in terms of single area, following Ochang National Industrial Complex. Originally, the project began with a scale of 6,769,091 m^{2} (72,861,889 sq ft), and passed the preliminary feasibility study of the Ministry of Strategy and Finance in September 2020. However, the area was reduced in the subsequent preliminary feasibility study. The Province plans to begin construction in 2026 and complete it in 2030, two years ahead of the original plan.

In 2024, the Biopharmaceutical Material Component Verification Support Test Bed Construction Project was finally selected as the Ministry of Trade, Industry and Energy's Material Component Industry Technology Development Base Construction Project. The province plans to invest 43.18 billion won, including 20 billion won in national funds, by 2028 to construct a material/component performance comparison test verification support center, an AI-based cell culture medium development platform, and material/component performance comparison test equipment.
