= Doosan Robotics =

South Korean robotics company

- Native name: 두산로보틱스 주식회사
- Company type: Public
- Traded as: KRX: 454910
- Industry: Robotics
- Founded: July 31, 2015; 10 years ago
- Headquarters: Suwon, Gyeonggi Province, South Korea
- Key people: Park In-won, Ryu Jeong-hoon
- Products: Cobot, service robot
- Parent: Doosan Group
- Website: www.doosanrobotics.com

Doosan Robotics (Korean: 두산로보틱스) is a South Korean robotics company founded in 2015. It mainly manufactures cobots and has a global market share of 5th place as of 2022.

== History ==
In July 2015, it was selected as a new growth engine for Doosan Group and established as a subsidiary. It went into mass production for the first time in 2018. As of 2024, it has a total of 13 product groups.

In October 2023, it was listed on the KOSPI stock market.

In September 2025, Doosan Robotics opened a new research and development hub, the Doosan Robotics Innovation Center, in Bundang, Gyeonggi Province, consolidating its AI, software, and intelligent robot research activities.

== Location ==
In May 2022, Doosan Robotics Americas, a U.S. corporation, was established in Plano, Texas.

In May 2024, a European branch was established in Düsseldorf, Germany, and a service center was built in Heerhugowaard, the Netherlands, to provide after-sales service such as installation and recovery of cobots and replacement of parts.

In July 2025, Doosan Robotics expanded its U.S. presence through the acquisition of ONExia Inc., a Pennsylvania-based engineering and automation company, strengthening its full-stack collaborative robotics capabilities.

== Products ==
As of 2022, the product sales volume is approximately 1,400 units, and the company's sales in North America and Europe account for 70% of the total. It ranks first in the domestic collaborative robot market share in South Korea. As of 2022, it holds approximately 72% of the global cobot market share for payloads of 20kg or more.

The company's other product lines are service robots, including camera robots, modular robot cafes, ice cream robots, and medical assistance robots. The camera robot also won a 2022 Consumer Electronics Show Innovation Award.

The company's cobot lineup can be largely categorized into the M, A, H, E, and P series: The E series is a model specialized for the Food and Beverage industry that was released in April 2023. The P series is a model unveiled at Automate 2024 in May 2024, and is specialized for palletizing with a payload of 30kg.
