= Naro-1 =

South Korea's first carrier rocket (2009–2013)

Naro 나로호
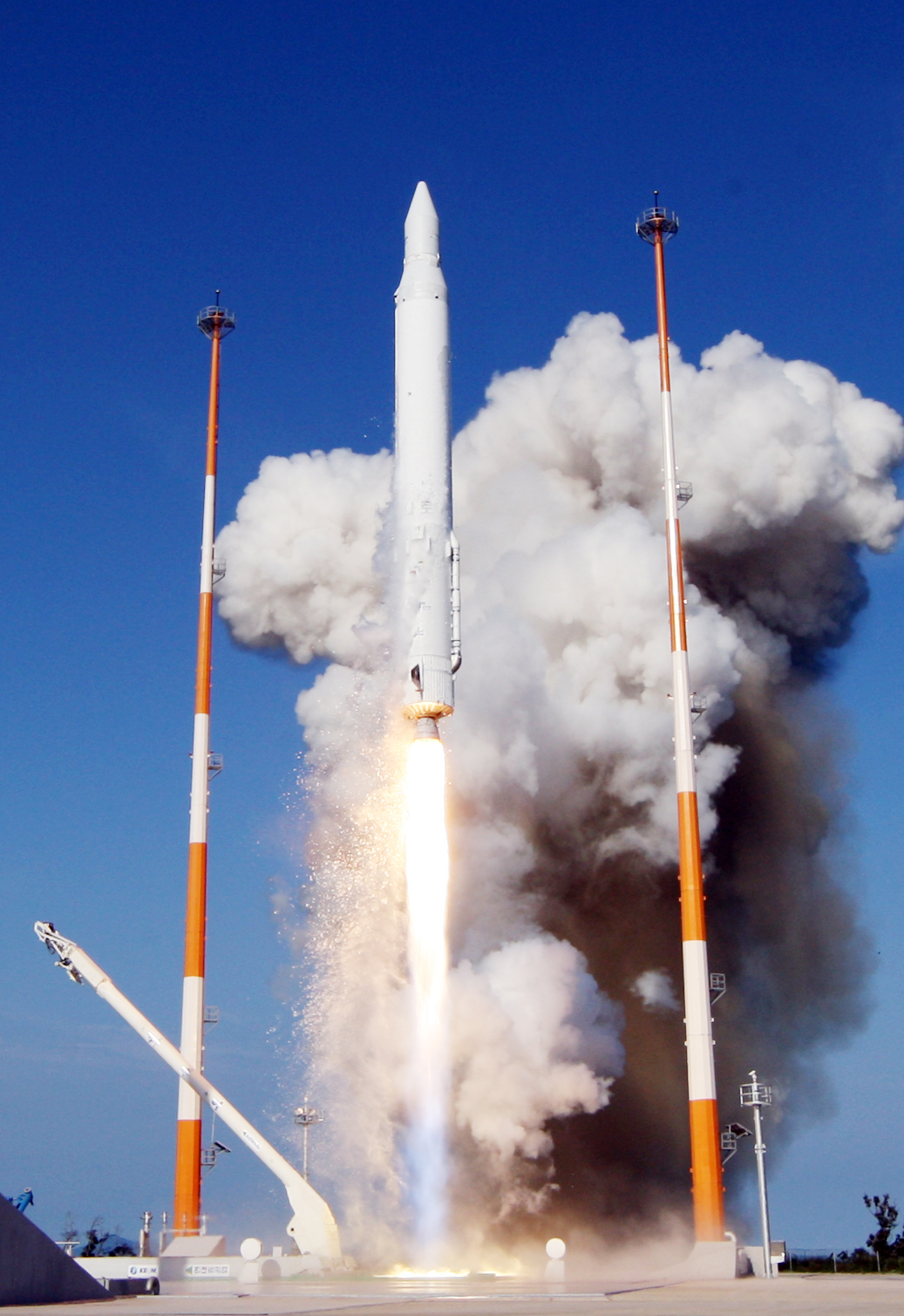
- Naro lifts off from the Launch Pad 1 at Naro Space Center, 25 August 2009.
- Function: Launch vehicle
- Manufacturer: Khrunichev (first stage); KARI (second stage)
- Project cost: ₩ 520.5 billion; US$460 million

Size
- Height: 33 m (108 ft)
- Diameter: 3 m (9.9 ft)
- Mass: 140,000 kg (300,000 lb)
- Stages: 2

Launch history
- Status: Retired
- Launch sites: Naro Space Center
- Total launches: 3
- Success(es): 1
- Failure: 2
- First flight: 25 August 2009
- Last flight: 30 January 2013

First stage
- Engines: 1 RD-191
- Thrust: 1670 kN
- Specific impulse: 338 sec
- Burn time: 300 seconds
- Propellant: LOX/RP-1

Second stage
- Engines: 1 Solid rocket motor
- Thrust: 86.2 kN
- Specific impulse: 288 sec
- Burn time: 25 seconds
- Propellant: Solid

Naro-1 (Korean: 나로호), previously designated the Korea Space Launch Vehicle or KSLV (also KSLV-1), was South Korea's first carrier rocket, and the first South Korean launch vehicle to achieve Earth orbit. On 30 January 2013, the third Naro-1 vehicle built successfully placed STSAT-2C into low Earth orbit.

The first stage was a modified Russian Angara (Russian: Ангара) URM. The solid-fuel second stage was built by KARI, the national space agency of South Korea, and Korean Air.

Neither the maiden flight on 25 August 2009, nor the second flight on June 10, 2010, reached orbit. The third flight on 30 January 2013, successfully reached orbit. The launches took place from the Naro Space Center. The official name of the first KSLV rocket, KSLV-I, is Naro, which is the name of the region in which Naro Space Center is located. Since Naro's retirement, the South Korean government has announced the rocket Nuri as its replacement and successor.

== History ==
In 1992, the Republic of Korea developed and launched several satellite systems and rockets overseas, such as the solid-fueled KSR-1 and KSR-2 sounding rockets. In 2000, Republic of Korea began construction of the Naro Space Center, located on Naro Island in Goheung, 485 kilometres (301 mi) south of Seoul, with Russian assistance. The work was completed by the launch of the 6,000-kilogram (13,000 lb) KSR-3 liquid-propellant sounding rocket on 28 November 2002. South Korea announced in 2002 that it intended to develop a small satellite launch vehicle by 2005 that would be based on technology flown on the KSR-3 test vehicle. The launcher would be entirely indigenous, based on the 122.500-kilonewton (27,539 lb_{f}) thrust LOX/kerosene motor used for the KSR-3 rocket stage. In 2005 a change was announced, indicating that they would use the Russian RD-191 as the vehicle's first stage. The program, like that of the Angara, was subject to continuous funding shortages and schedule delays.

On 26 October 2004, during the visit of a GKNPTs Khrunichev delegation headed by A. A. Medvedev, Director General to Republic of Korea, a contract was signed to design and build a Space Rocket Complex for the small-lift launch vehicle KSLV-1. The design represented a joint effort between GKNPTs Khrunichev partner NPO Energomash "V. P. Glushko", who would build the first stage of KSLV-1, and Republic of Korea KARI, who would design and produce the second stage. As the prerequisite to signing the contract South Korea joined the Missile Technology Control Regime (MTCR). All documentation was reviewed by the Russian Space Agency (RSA), and the joint project to build the Korean rocket complex was approved. The vehicle was unveiled at the Naro Space Center in Goheung, South Jeolla Province in October 2008. South Korea has spent some KR₩ 500 billion (US$ 490 million) since 2002 on the project.

The total cost of the first three launches was over 500 billion won (US$450 million), raising concerns among the Korean populace about the value of the Naro space program.

=== Impediments to South Korean rocket development ===
Republic of Korea efforts to build an indigenous space launch vehicle is hindered due to persistent political pressure of the United States, who had for many decades hindered South Korea's indigenous rocket and missile development programs in fear of their possible connection to clandestine military ballistic missile programs. South Korea has sought the assistance of foreign countries such as Russia through MTCR commitments to supplement its restricted domestic rocket technology. South Korea is working on an engine for an indigenous launcher planned for 2021.

== Vehicle description ==
The whole rocket was originally planned to be completely indigenous, but due to technological constraints largely spurred by political pressure from the United States that discouraged independent research and development of rocket technology by South Korea, KARI decided that the KSLV would be built on the basis of the universal rocket module (URM) designed for the Russian Angara family of rockets. The first stage of the vehicle uses the Russian RD-151 engine, which is essentially the RD-191 de-powered to 170 tonnes-force (1.7 MN; 370,000 lbf) from 190 tonnes. The second stage is a solid rocket motor developed and built by KARI. The launch vehicle weighs 140 tonnes (310,000 lb), stands 33 metres (108 ft) tall and has a diameter of almost 3 metres (9 ft 10 in).

== Launch history ==
Flight No.	Date / time (UTC)	Rocket, Configuration	Launch site	Payload	Payload mass	Orbit	Customer	Launch outcome
1	25 August 2009; 08:00	Naro-1	Naro Space Center	(South Korea) STSAT-2A	90 kg	Low Earth (planned)	KARI	Failure
1	Fairing did not separate, failed to reach orbit							
2	10 June 2010; 08:01	Naro-1	Naro Space Center	(South Korea) STSAT-2B	100 kg	Low Earth (planned)	KARI	Failure
2	Signal lost 137 seconds after launch, cause disputed.							
3	30 January 2013; 07:00	Naro-1	Naro Space Center	(South Korea) STSAT-2C	100 kg	Low Earth	KARI	Success
3	First successful launch of Naro-1							

=== First flight ===
The first launch of the Naro-1 took place on 25 August 2009. The rocket was launched from the Naro Space Center. The Khrunichev-built first stage reportedly performed nominally, and the second stage separation took place as expected, but the payload fairing separation system malfunctioned and half of the satellite protective cover stayed bolted to the second stage. The added weight of the remaining fairing caused the rocket to tumble upwards and to be thrown off its nominal course, soaring 20 kilometres (12 mi) above the planned altitude before falling down. The payload (STSAT-2) reentered the atmosphere and disintegrated.

The Government of the Republic of Korea officially approved the launch of the KSLV in June 2009, which was expected to send the STSAT-2A satellite into orbit. The launch was first tentatively scheduled for 11 August, after receiving approval from the National Space Committee. The first actual attempt to launch Naro-1 was conducted on 19 August 2009, but the launch was canceled seven minutes 56 seconds before launch.

=== Second flight ===
The launch of the second Naro-1 took place on 10 June 2010 at 08:01 UTC. The launch ended in failure 137 seconds (2 minutes 17 seconds) later, when contact with the rocket was lost. Ahn Byung-man, Minister of Science and Technology, told reporters that the rocket was believed to have exploded in midair. The launch originally had been scheduled for 9 June 2010, but was postponed due to a malfunction of a fire protection system.

Thirteen engineering experts from Republic of Korea and thirteen from Russian Federation formed a Failure Review Board and met in August 2010 to discuss the launch. They were able to officially conclude that the launch had failed. Further investigation was ongoing as to the cause of the failure. A new independent team consisting of 30 experts was formed in June 2011 for the further investigation but failed to conclude the cause of the failure, deciding to send four recommendations for the Failure Review Board instead.

=== Third flight ===
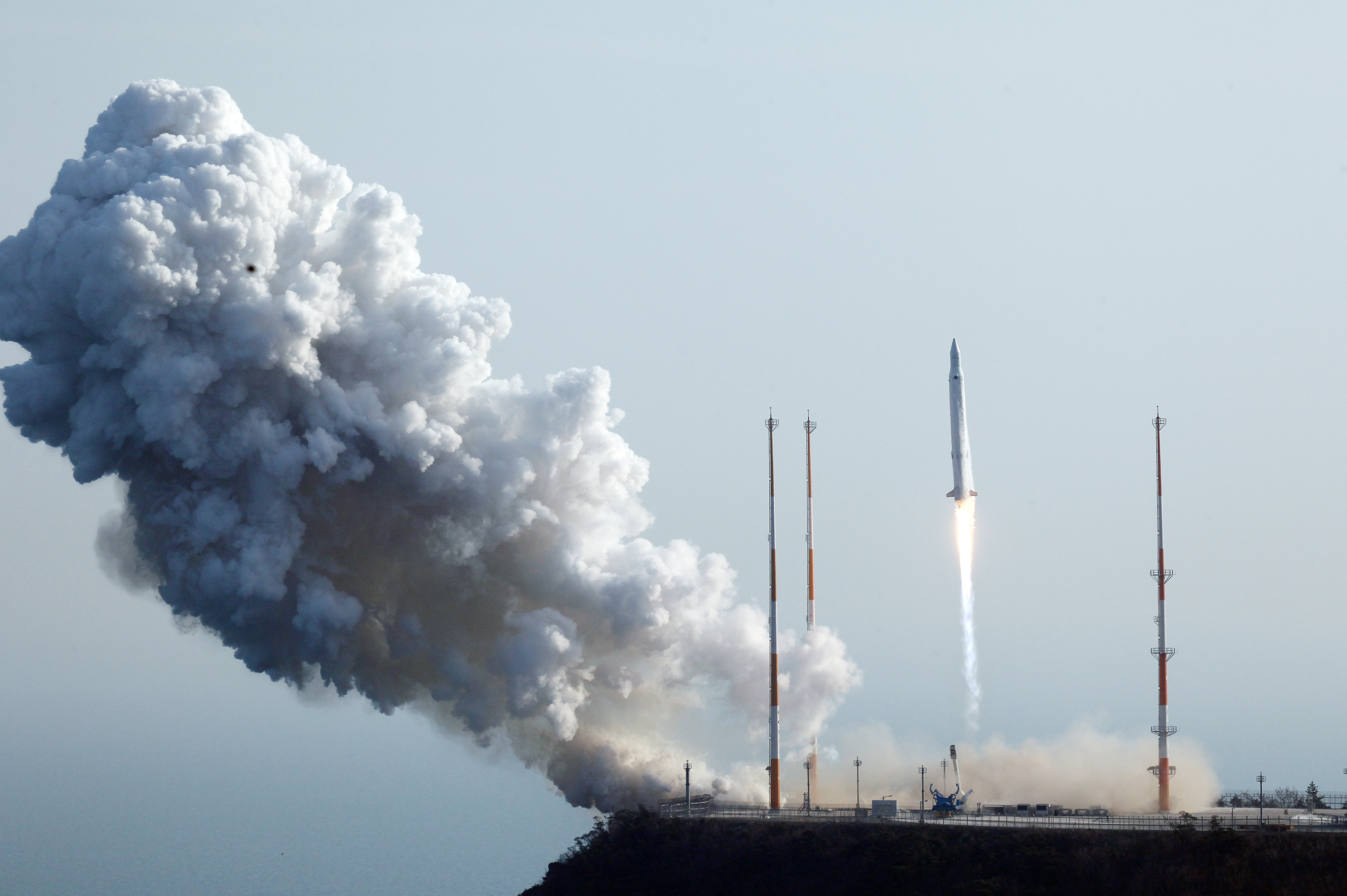
Launch of the Naro-1 carrying STSAT-2C on 30 January 2013

Naro-1 became the first South Korean launch vehicle to achieve Earth orbit on 30 January 2013, when it was successfully used to launch the Science and Technology Satellite 2C (STSAT-2C). Naro-1 launched from the Naro Space Center, located 480 kilometers south of Seoul.

==== Previous launch history for the third flight ====
Launch of the third flight was postponed from its original launch date of late October to sometime in mid to late November due to a damaged rubber ring that caused a fuel leak. A launch countdown on 29 November was halted 17 minutes prior to launch due to an excessive electric current reading, indicating some type of electrical malfunction. Diagnosing and correcting the problem were reported to require delaying the launch for at least four days. The Republic of Korea government announced this would be the final flight attempt. Had the mission failed there would not be another attempt and the project would come to an end.

While the immediate cause of the leak was a damaged rubber seal further investigation into the failure revealed a defective adapter bloc linking the rocket to the port. Korean ministry announced that the new adapters will be brought in from Russia in preparation for the launch. A new preliminary launch date no earlier than 24 November 2012 was also announced.

While no cause for the failure of the second launch has officially been declared, changes to the third launch were to include eliminating the flight termination system on the second stage (built by Republic of Korea KARI), and changes to the system on the first stage (supplied by Russia). Changes to the electrical system that operates the payload fairing were also to be made. The first stage of the rocket Naro-1 for the third attempt was delivered from the Russian manufacturer at the end of August 2012.

Shortly after the mishap with the second launch attempt, South Korea had announced the third flight would take place in 2011. Specific plans were never announced and no launch attempt was made in 2011.

== Political impact ==
The third launch of Naro-1 occurred one month after North Korea's successful December 2012 launch of their Unha-3 rocket developed with North Korean technology. The launch came in the wake of news that North Korea had plans for a third nuclear test.

== Comparable rockets ==
- Unha
- VLS-1
- ASLV

== See also ==
- Comparison of orbital launchers families
- Comparison of orbital launch systems
- 2010 in spaceflight
- List of launch vehicles
- Timeline of first orbital launches by country
- KSLV-2
