= Naro Space Center =

South Korean spaceport in South Jeolla

Naro Space Center Korean: 나로우주센터
- IATA: none; ICAO: none

Summary
- Airport type: Spaceport
- Owner: Government of South Korea
- Operator: KARI
- Location: Outer Naro Island, Goheung, South Jeolla, South Korea
- Opened: June 11, 2009
- Time zone: Korea Standard Time (+09:00)
- Coordinates: 34°25′55″N 127°32′06″E
- Website: www.kari.re.kr/narospacecenter

Map
- Location within South Korea Location within Asia Location within Earth

- Naro Space Center
- Hangul: 나로우주센터
- Hanja: 羅老宇宙센터
- RR: Naro uju senteo
- MR: Naro uju sent'ŏ

The Naro Space Center is a South Korean spaceport in South Jeolla's Goheung County, operated by the state-run Korea Aerospace Research Institute.

The spaceport is located about 485 km (300 mi) south of Seoul. It includes two launch pads, a control tower, rocket assembly and test facilities, facilities for satellite control testing and assembly, a media center, an electric power station, a space experience hall and a landing field. It has supported five launches including the KSLV-II launch in 2021, and will support SSLV launches in 2025.

== History ==
=== Naro-1 ===
The first launch, initially planned for August 19, 2009, was performed on August 25, 2009 using a Russo-South Korean Naro-1 rocket, but failed to reach the desired orbit. Another rocket launch from Naro was planned for May 2010, but delays pushed the launch to June. On June 10, 2010, this second attempt also ended in failure when the rocket lost communications 137 seconds after launch. The South Korean science minister Ahn Byung-man later told reporters that the rocket was believed to have exploded.

A third attempt was made on January 30, 2013 and finally succeeded in putting a satellite into orbit.

=== KSLV-II TLV ===
The TLV (Test Launch Vehicle) was the second vehicle to use the Naro Space Center. It was launched on a suborbital mission on November 28, 2018, having a mission objective of qualifying the KRE-075 engine which powers the KSLV-II. The launch was a success. The single-stage TLV rocket reached an altitude of 209 kilometres (130 mi) before splashing down into sea; the flight was 10 minutes long.

=== Nuri ===
On 21 October 2021 the Nuri rocket (KSLV-II) was launched on its maiden flight from Naro. The rocket reached the planned altitude but failed to put a dummy satellite payload into orbit due to a problem with the rocket's third stage. While South Korea says it intends to use Nuri to launch satellites exclusively, the test has also been viewed by some experts as part of the country's ongoing efforts to develop ballistic missile capabilities. The second flight of Nuri on 21 June 2022 successfully reached orbit.

== Facilities ==
=== LC-1 (LB-1) ===
LC-1, also called LB-1 for the pad itself, is the first pad constructed in the Naro Space Center. It supported 3 Naro-1 launches and the KSLV-II TLV launch. It will also support the SSLV (Small Satellite Launch Vehicle) launches from 2025. It is located at 34.431803°N 127.536397°E.

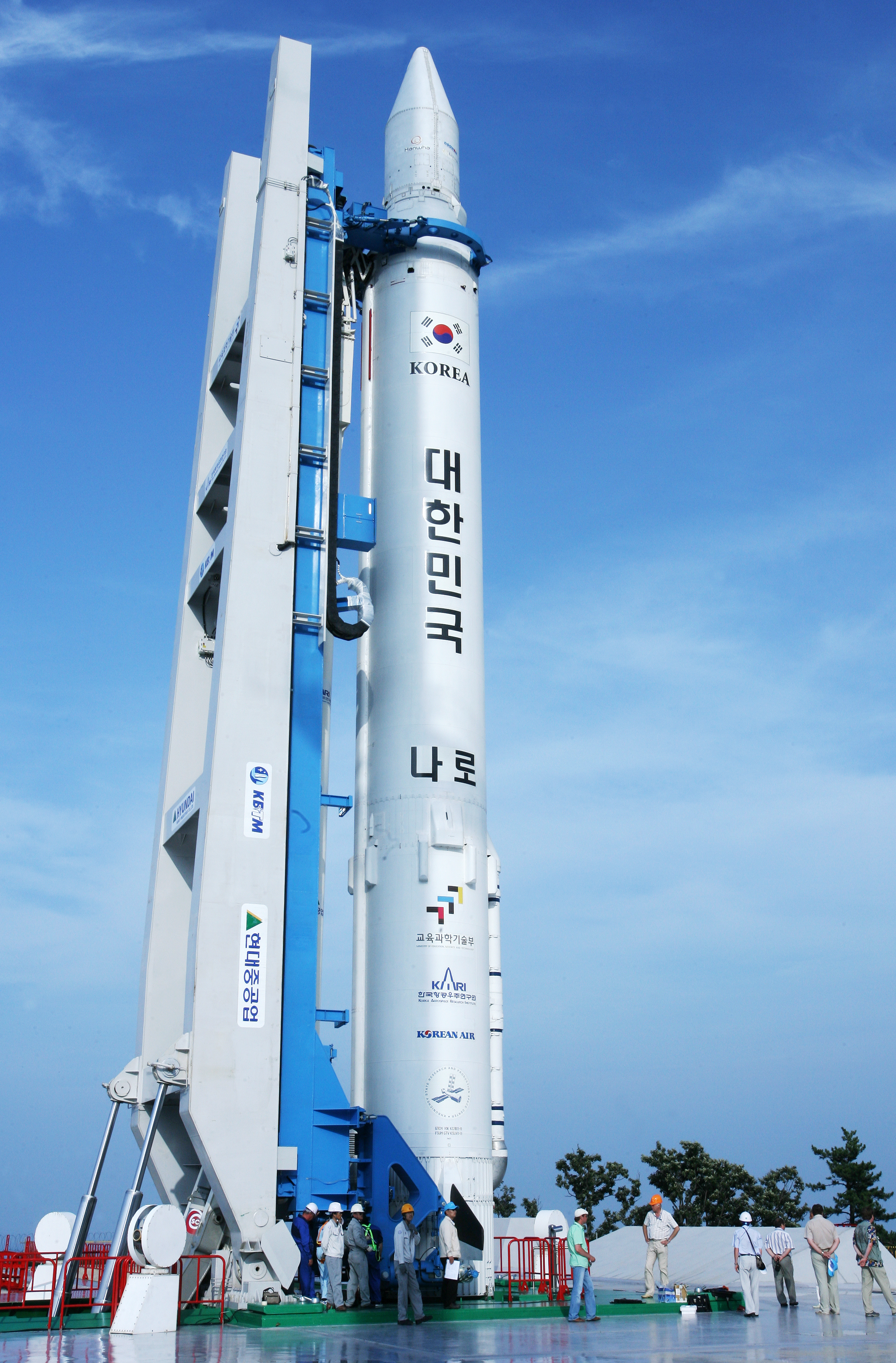
Naro-1 at LC-1

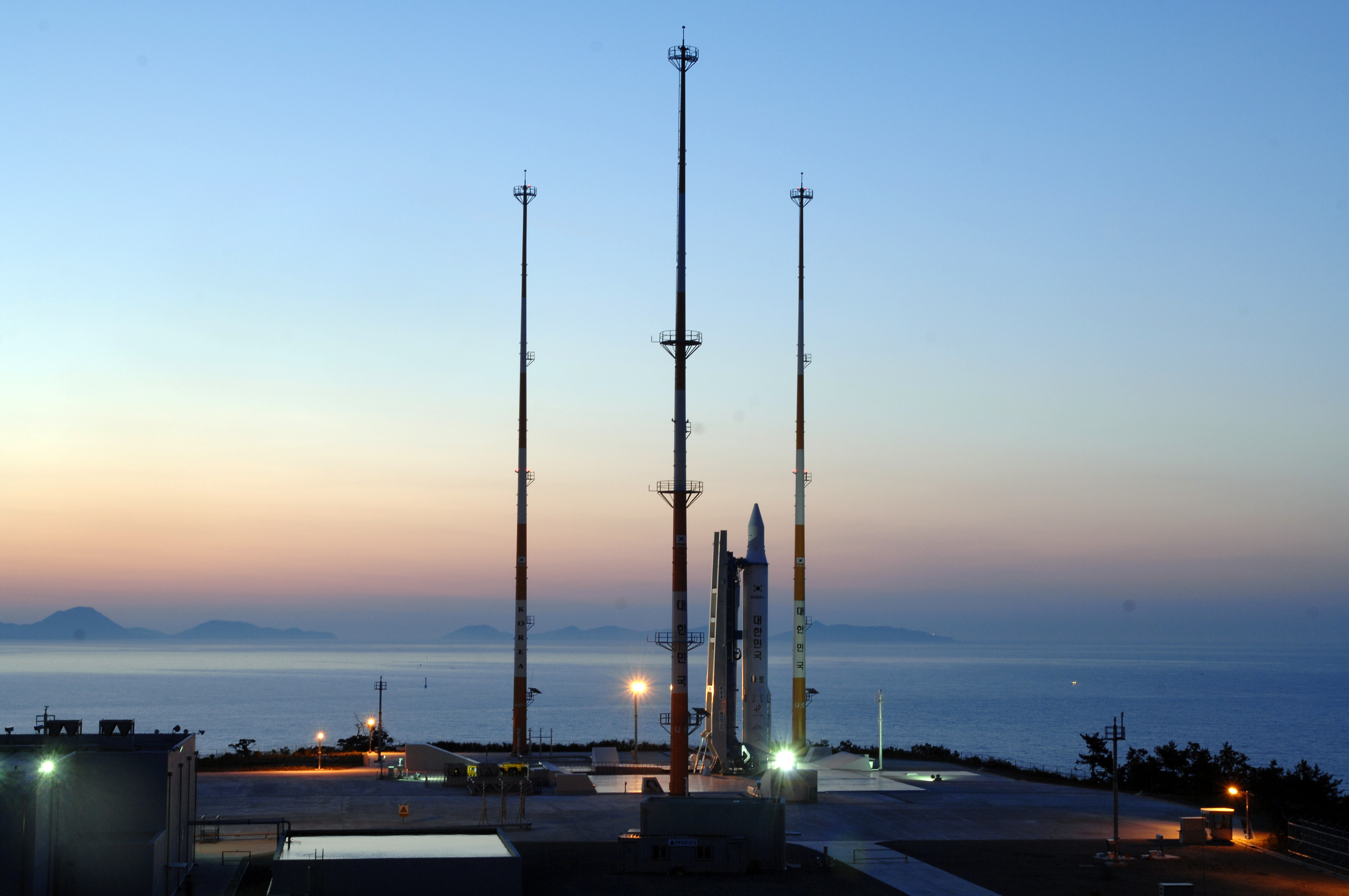
Naro-1 at LC-1

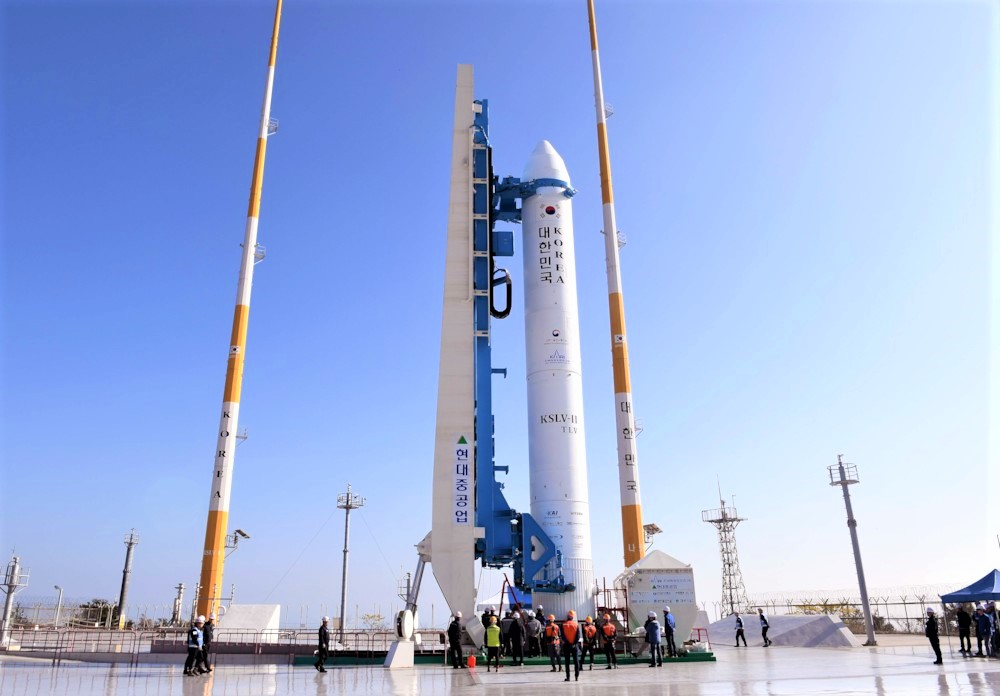
KSLV-II TLV at LC-1

=== LC-2 (LB-2) ===
LC-2, also called LB-2 for the pad itself, is the second pad in the Naro Space Center. It supported the first Nuri launch in 2021. Different from LC-1, which doesn't have an umbilical tower, LC-2 has a tower to support the KSLV-II. It is located at 34.431636°N 127.534411°E.

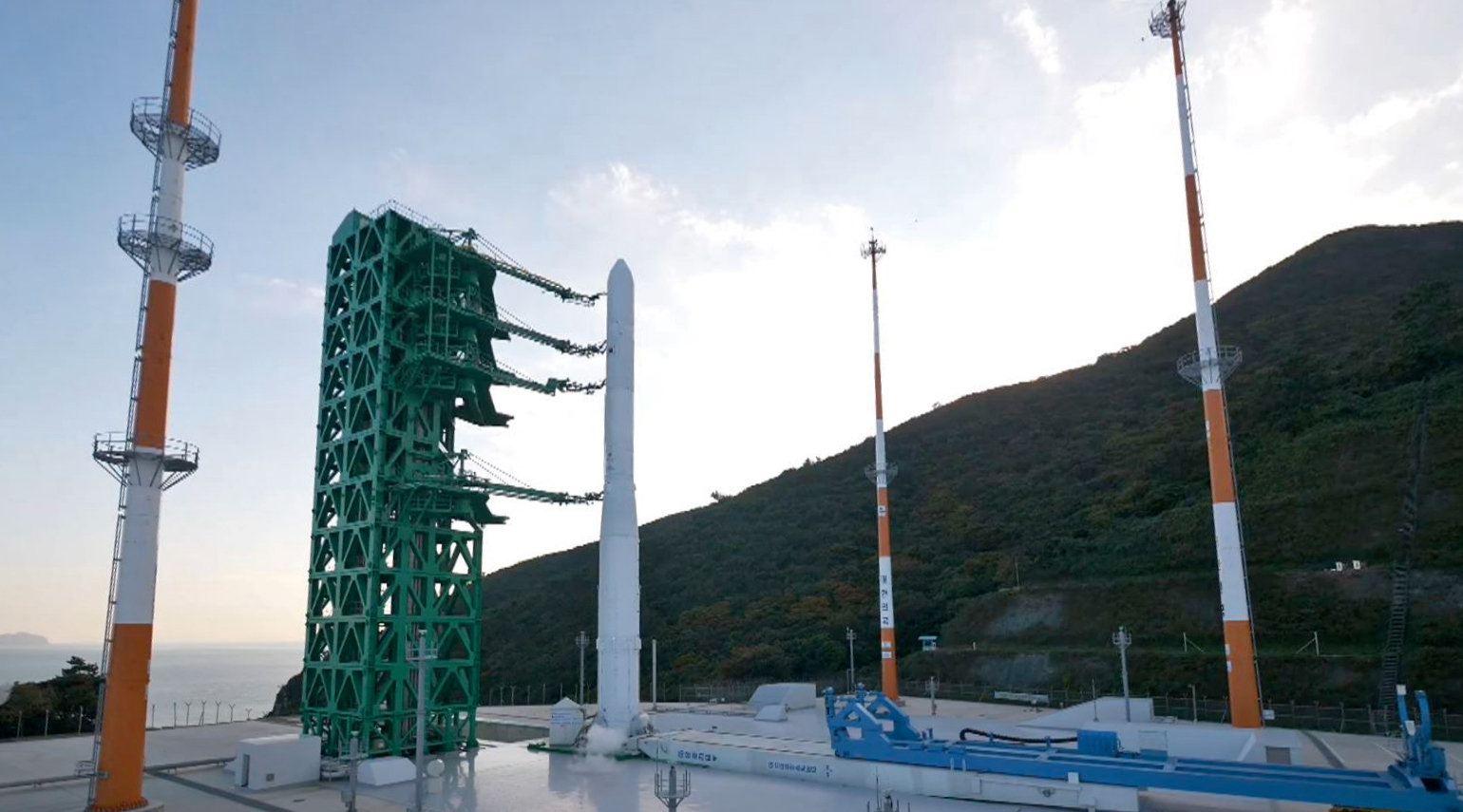
Nuri at LC-2

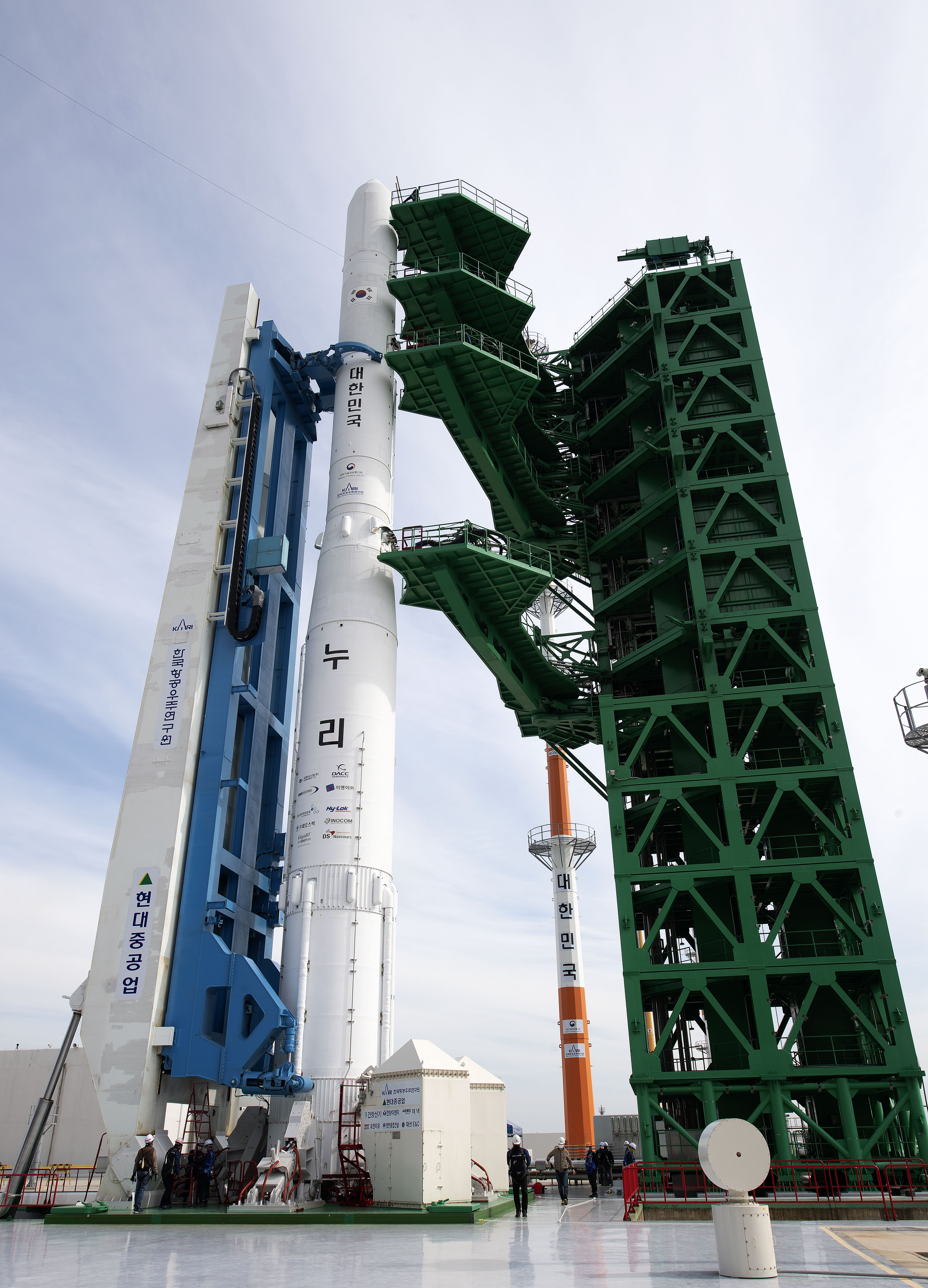
Nuri at LC-2

== See also ==
- Korea Aerospace Research Institute
- Korean Astronaut Program
