= Arirang (disambiguation) =

"Arirang" is a Korean folk song.

Arirang may also refer to:

== In North Korea ==
- Arirang Fantasy
- Arirang Mass Games
- Arirang (smartphone)

== In South Korea ==
=== Entertainment ===
- Arirang TV
- Arirang Radio

=== Film ===
- Arirang (1926 film)
- Arirang geuhu iyagi (1930 film)
- Arirang 3 (1936 film)
- Arirang (1954 South Korean film)
- Arirang (1968 film)
- Arirang (2003 South Korean film)
- Arirang (2011 film)
- Kuro Arirang
- Susanne Brink's Arirang

=== Albums ===
- Arirang (album), by BTS (2026)
  - Arirang World Tour

=== Satellites ===
- Arirang-1 (1999)
- Arirang-2 (2006)
- Arirang-3 (2012)
- Arirang-5 (2013)
- Arirang-3A (2015)

=== Other ===
- Arirang bond

== Other uses ==
- Alilang Group, Chinese music group
- Arirang F.C., football club based in the Philippines
