= Seung Jo Kim =

Korean engineer

- 김승조

The Chief Executive Officer of SpaceD Corporation

Personal details
- Born: June 24, 1950 (age 76) South Korea

Seung Jo Kim is a South Korean aerospace engineer, academic, and technology entrepreneur. He is a Professor Emeritus at Seoul National University and the founder of the space technology company SpaceD. Kim served as the 9th President of the Korea Aerospace Research Institute (KARI) from 2011 to 2014, where he managed key national aerospace projects including the successful launch of South Korea's first space launch vehicle, Naro-1 (KSLV-I), as well as the KOMPSAT-3 and KOMPSAT-5 satellites. His research and professional work focus on integrating aerospace systems engineering with high-performance parallel supercomputing, advancing the "New Space" economy, and developing space datacenter technologies.

== Educational Background ==
Kim completed his bachelor's degree in the Department of Aerospace Engineering at Seoul National University in 1973. Following his graduation, he served as a scientific officer and senior researcher at the Agency for Defense Development (ADD) from 1973 to 1979, where he contributed to missile-related research and development. He subsequently pursued graduate studies in the United States, earning his M.S. (1981) and Ph.D. (1985) in Aerospace Engineering from the University of Texas at Austin.

== Academic career and parallel supercomputing ==
In 1986, Kim joined the faculty of the Department of Mechanical and Aerospace Engineering at Seoul National University, where he served until his retirement in 2015. He held several academic leadership roles, including serving as the president of the Korean Society for Aeronautical and Space Sciences (KSAS) in 2009, the Korean Society for Composite Materials (KSCM) from 2005 to 2006, and the Korean Society for Industrial and Applied Mathematics (KSIAM) from 2004 to 2008. He was elected as a Fellow of the American Institute of Aeronautics and Astronautics (AIAA) in 2009.

=== IPSAP and the Gordon Bell prize ===
During his academic tenure, Kim led the development of IPSAP (Internet Parallel Structural Analysis Program), a parallel finite-element structural analysis code used in the aerospace, automotive, and shipbuilding industries. To support the massive computational requirements of this software, Kim focused on building cluster supercomputers utilizing commercial off-the-shelf (COTS) components rather than proprietary mainframe servers. In recognition of his team's advancements in parallel structural analysis algorithms, Kim was awarded the Gordon Bell Prize at the Supercomputing 2001 (SC2001) conference in Denver, Colorado.

=== The PEGASUS Supercomputer ===
Following the Gordon Bell Prize, Kim initiated a project to build a cluster supercomputer based on the Windows operating system. The project expanded into an international industry-academia collaboration, with Microsoft providing initial research funding along with the Windows OS, Intel contributing server CPUs and Samsung Electronics providing motherboards and ECC memory modules to ensure system stability.

Named PEGASUS, the system achieved performance exceeding one teraflops. In 2003, PEGASUS was ranked 56th on the TOP500 list, the highest position attained by a South Korean supercomputer at that time. In 2006, Microsoft expanded the collaboration by signing an MOU to support the development of a user-friendly graphical user interface (GUI) for IPSAP, running on the Windows Compute Cluster Server (WCCS) environment.

=== Cyclocopter ===
Since 2000, Kim has been doing research on the cyclocopter with 4 rotors. In 2012, he held an outdoor flight demonstration of the cyclocopter for the first time in the world. The cyclocopter is a new VTOL (Vertical Take-Off and Landing) air vehicle that employs a unique propulsion system of cycloidal blades to generate the propulsion and lift for a VTOL maneuver. The rotor system consists of several blades rotating about a horizontal axis that is perpendicular to the direction of normal flight. The cycloidal propeller offers powerful thrust levels, and a unique ability to change the direction of the thrust almost instantly.

== KARI president ==
Kim was appointed as the 9th President of the Korea Aerospace Research Institute (KARI) in June 2011. His tenure followed two consecutive launch failures of the Naro-1 (KSLV-I) vehicle. On January 30, 2013, KARI successfully conducted the third and final launch of the Naro-1, placing a satellite into orbit and making South Korea the 11th nation to successfully launch a satellite using a domestically developed vehicle.

During his presidency, KARI launched the KOMPSAT-3 (Arirang-3) optical satellite in May 2012 and the KOMPSAT-5 (Arirang-5) synthetic aperture radar (SAR) satellite in 2013. He also directed the development of the KOMPSAT-3A satellite and supervised the development of the Smart Unmanned Aerial Vehicle (UAV) and the KARI Satellite Design System (KSDS).

== Media contributions and public advocacy for space economy ==
Following his retirement from Seoul National University, Kim has been an active contributor to public discourse regarding the "New Space" economy. He is the author of Disruptive Innovation in Space Technology, Now the 5th Industrial Revolution (2023).

Since 2025, Kim has authored a column series in The JoongAng titled "Seung Jo Kim's Space Economy of Innovation" (김승조의 혁신의 우주경제). In his columns, he provides analysis on global aerospace trends, including the development of reusable launch vehicles such as SpaceX's Starship and Falcon 9. His writings also address the strategic importance of Low Earth Orbit Positioning, Navigation, and Timing (LEO PNT) systems, the role of solid-fuel launch vehicles in national security, and the integration of AI-powered orbital data centers.

== SpaceD and the space datacenter vision ==
In 2024, Kim founded SpaceD, a technology company developing Software-Defined Datacenter Satellite (SDDS) systems. The company aims to evolve satellite architecture from single-purpose hardware to multi-tenant orbital computing platforms. At the 2026 BEXCO exhibition, SpaceD demonstrated the practical application of SDDS technology for orbital data processing and AI-driven services.

SpaceD's architecture involves equipping low Earth orbit (LEO) satellites with high-performance processors, such as space-grade GPUs, to serve as distributed computing nodes. The system employs autonomous resource management algorithms for workload scheduling and thermal control—an approach built upon Kim's previous research in parallel computing and system optimization, specifically his leadership of the PEGASUS supercomputer project.

The company operates a fabless business model, outsourcing physical satellite manufacturing while focusing on the software-defined mission layer and system integration. This model intends to integrate South Korea's semiconductor manufacturing capabilities into the development of radiation-hardened space components.

== Awards ==
- 2001 Gordon Bell Prize (SC2001, Denver, Colorado, United States)
- 2004 Fellow, Institute of Physics, United Kingdom
- 2007 Leadership Award for Technical Computing, Microsoft
- 2008 The Research Award of Seoul National University
- 2010 Fellow, American Institute of Aeronautics and Astronautics
- 2013 Medal of Innovation in Science by the South Korean government
- 2013 '21st Century Award of the Year' in Science & Technology
