= KOMPSAT-3A =

South Korean Earth observation satellite

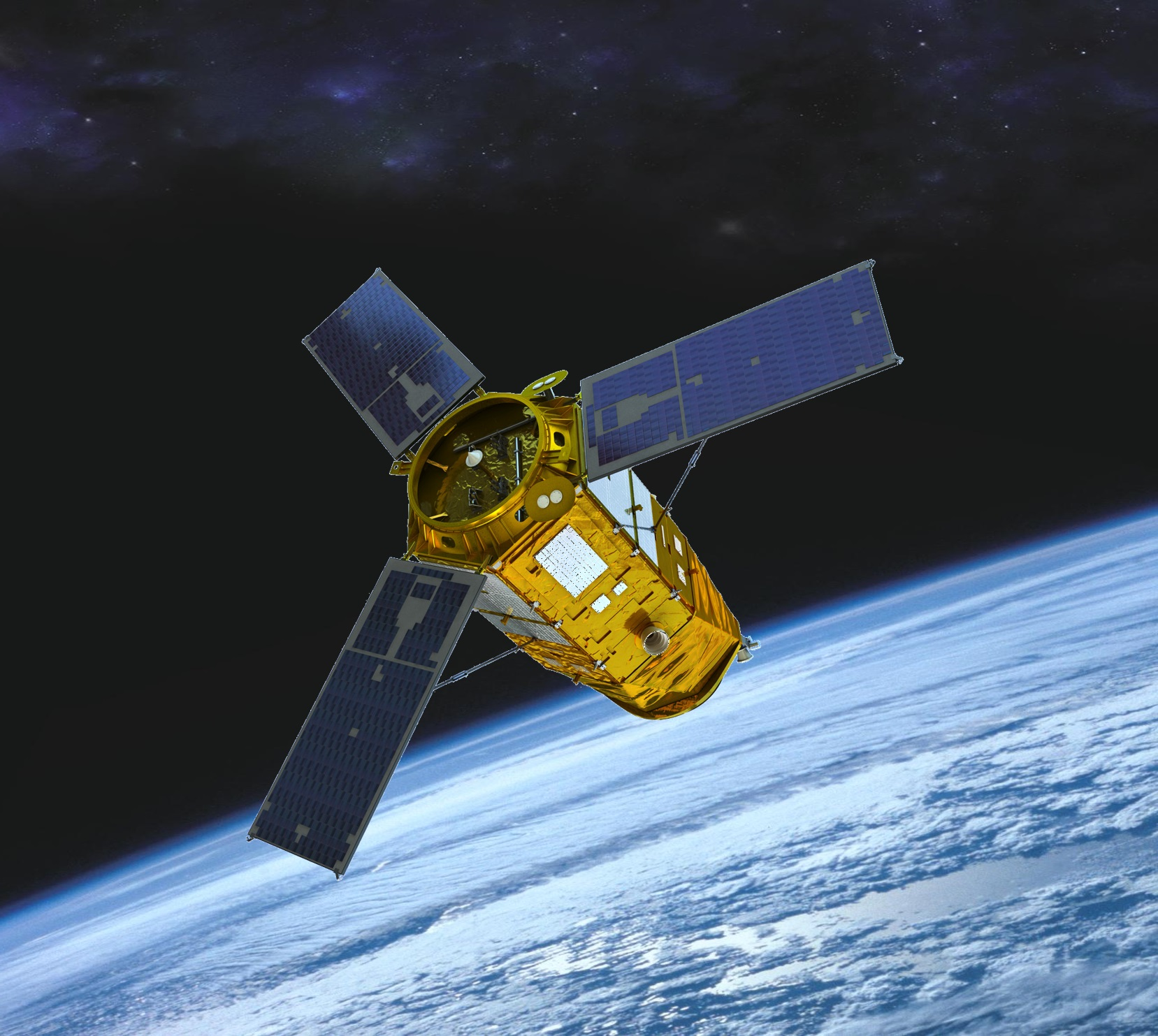
- Names: Korean Multi-purpose Satellite-3A; Arirang-3A
- Mission type: Earth observation
- Operator: Korea Aerospace Research Institute
- COSPAR ID: 2015-014A
- SATCAT no.: 40536
- Mission duration: 5 years (planned); 11 years and 1 month (in progress)

Spacecraft properties
- Spacecraft type: KOMPSAT
- Manufacturer: Korea Aerospace Industries, several private companies
- Launch mass: 1,100 kg (2,400 lb)
- Dimensions: 2.0 m in diameter x 3.8 m in height
- Power: 4.5 kW

Orbital parameters
- Regime: Sun-synchronous orbit
- Altitude: 528 km (328 mi)

KOMPSAT-3A (Korean Multi-purpose Satellite-3A), also known as Arirang-3A, is a South Korean Earth observation satellite equipped with a 55cm-resolution electro-optical camera and an infrared sensor developed by the Korea Aerospace Research Institute. It was launched on March 25, 2015.

== Development ==
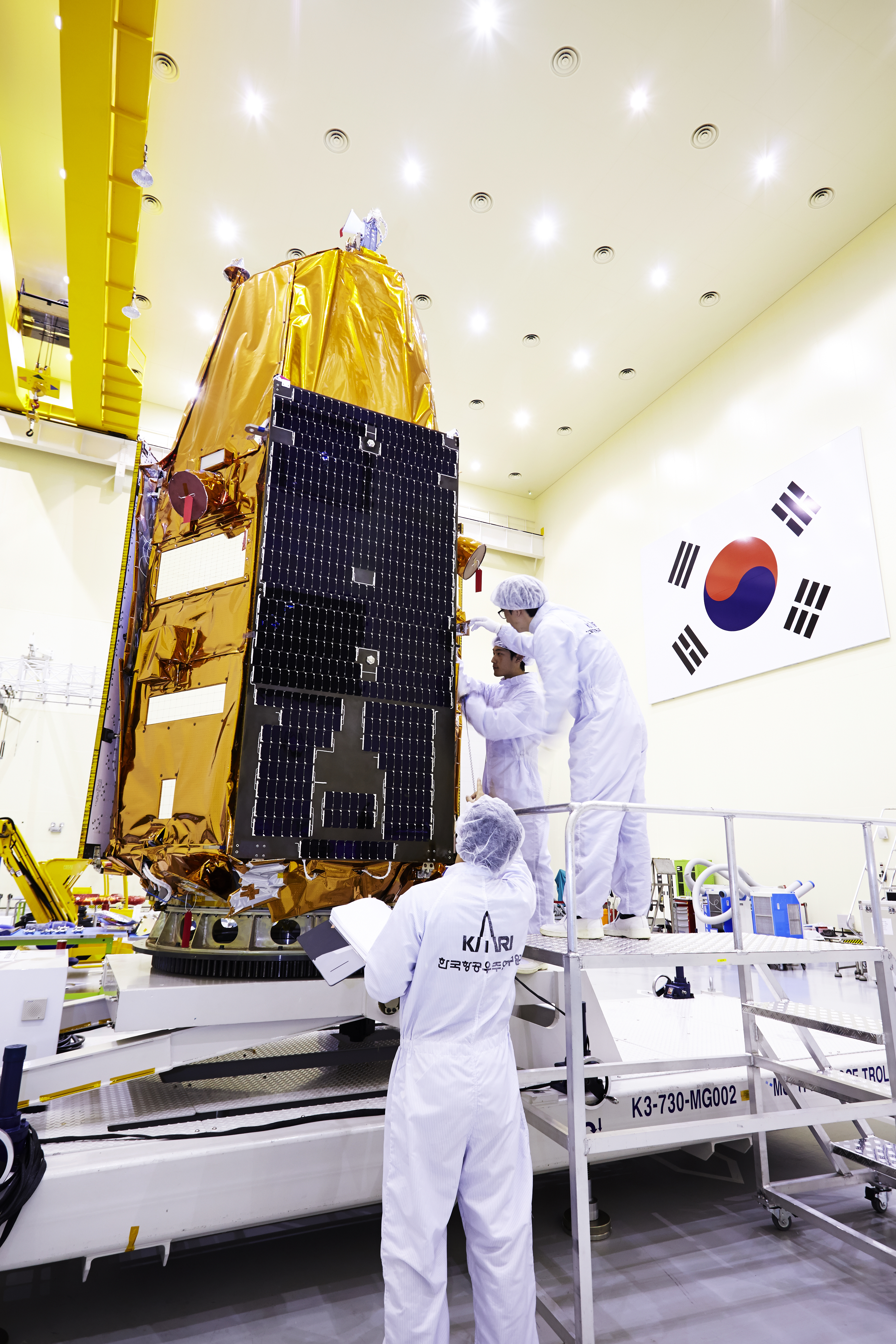
KOMPSAT-3A being built by engineers

KOMPSAT-3A was developed by the Korea Aerospace Research Institute over eight years from December 2006 with a total project cost of 235.9 billion won.

Four companies, including Korean Air, Hanwha, Satrec Initiative, and the AP System-Korea Aerospace Industries consortium, participated in the private sector bid for satellite development that closed in 2009. All of these companies participated in the development of KOMPSAT-1 and KOMPSAT-2.

The KAI-AP Aerospace consortium was responsible for manufacturing the main body after receiving technology of KARI, while Korean Air, Doowon Heavy Industries, Hanwha, Alpion, Setrec Initiative, and Samsung Thales were in charge of the main body and payload sectors.

== Technology ==
It is the first South Korean-made satellite to be equipped with a high-performance infrared sensor and a submeter-level optical sensor. The onboard electro-optical camera identifies objects 0.5 cm above ground in both width and height. In addition, when post-processing images obtained from a satellite, high-resolution images with a resolution of 0.5 m or less can be obtained. The main functions of the equipped infrared sensor are as follows:

- The resolution is 0.55 m in black and white and 2.2 m in color, which is a significant improvement over the 0.7 m in black and white and 2.8 m in color of KOMPSAT-3 launched in 2012.
- Since it detects the heat of the observation target with an observation wavelength band of 3.3~5.2μm, imaging is possible even at night.
- It can detect heat from the ground and obtain observation images regardless of time and weather.

Its size is 2.0 m in diameter, 3.8 m in height, 6.3 m in width, weighs 1.1 tons, and its design life is 4 years.

== Mission ==
It was launched on March 25, 2015, at 3:08 a.m. aboard the Dnepr from the Yasny launch base in Russia.

- 3:08: Launch
- 3:15: Separated from the launch vehicle 537 km above the southern Arabian Peninsula

At 1:04 p.m. KST, through communication with the Korea Aerospace Research Institute Satellite Control Center in Daejeon, it was confirmed that the satellite's overall condition was good.

The main mission of KOMPSAT 3-A is to perform an Earth observation mission by orbiting the Korean Peninsula twice a day and night, 528 km for four years. It can photograph the Peninsula for 10 minutes with an optical lens and for 2 minutes with an infrared sensor, and can observe natural disasters such as forest fires, volcanic eruptions, oil wells or coal seam fires, and climate phenomena such as urban heat islands.

In 2018, Setrec Imaging Services (SIIS), a national satellite image export sales agency, signed a contract with India to supply images of Indian territory taken by KOMPSAT-3 and 3A for 4 million dollars for two years.

== See also ==
- South Korean space program
