= KOMPSAT-3 =

South Korean Earth observation satellite

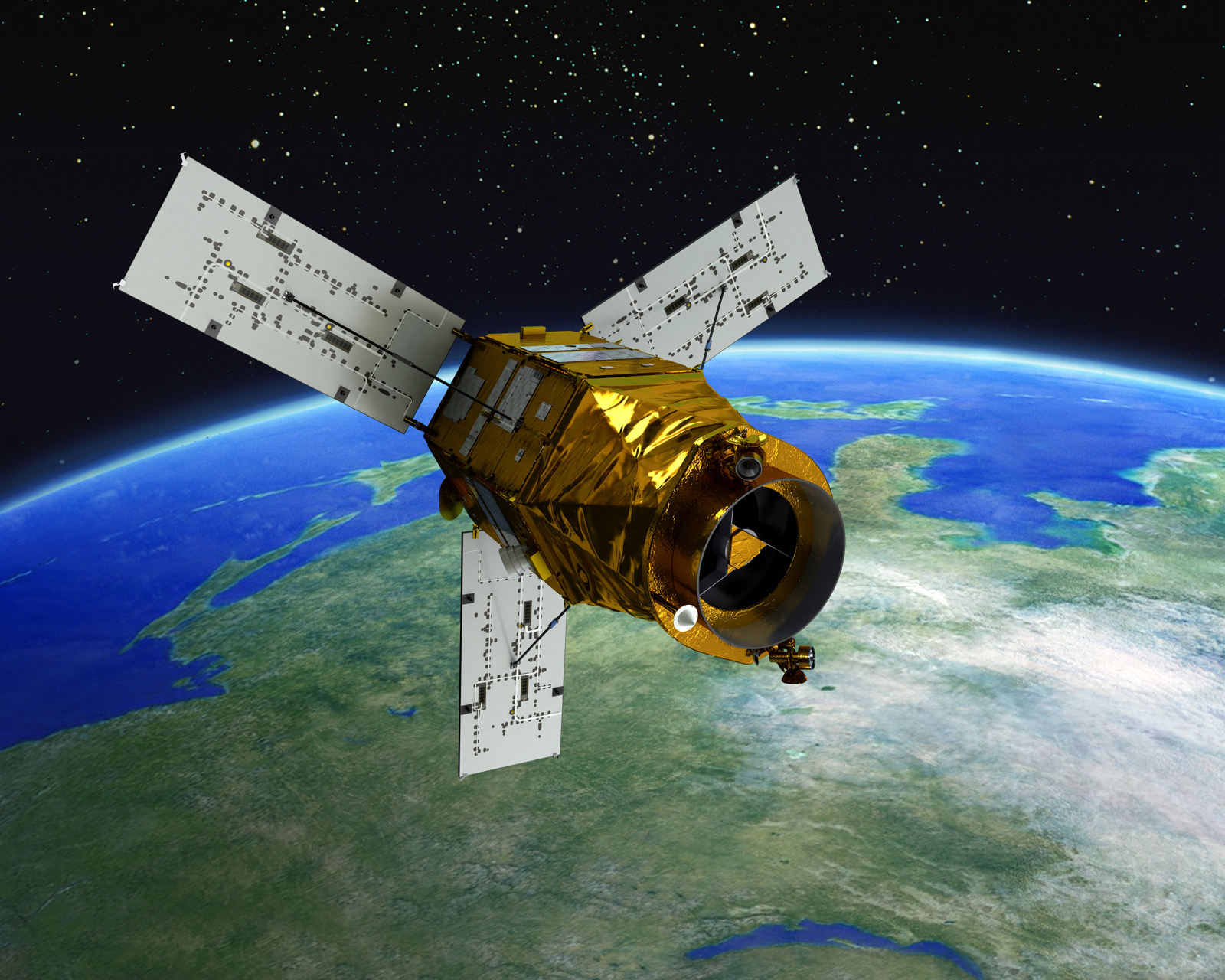
- Names: Korean Multi-purpose Satellite-3; Arirang-3
- Mission type: Earth observation
- Operator: Korea Aerospace Research Institute
- COSPAR ID: 2012-025B
- SATCAT no.: 38338
- Mission duration: 4 years (planned); 14 years (in progress)

Spacecraft properties
- Spacecraft type: KOMPSAT
- Manufacturer: Korea Aerospace Industries; Korea Aerospace Research Institute; EADS Astrium (bus)
- Launch mass: 980 kg (2,160 lb)
- Dimensions: 2.9 m in diameter x 3.5 m in height
- Power: 1.3 kW

Start of mission
- Launch date: 17 May 2012, 16:39 UTC
- Rocket: H-IIA (202) (# 21)
- Launch site: Tanegashima Space Center
- Contractor: Mitsubishi Heavy Industries
- Entered service: 29 March 2013

Orbital parameters
- Reference system: Geocentric orbit
- Regime: Sun-synchronous orbit
- Altitude: 685 km (426 mi)
- Inclination: 98.13°
- Period: 98.5 minutes

Instruments
- Advanced Earth Imaging Sensor System (AEISS)

KOMPSAT-3 (Korean Multi-purpose Satellite-3), also known as Arirang-3, is a South Korean multipurpose Earth observation satellite. It was launched from Tanegashima Space Center, Japan at 16:39 UTC on 17 May 2012. Like the earlier KOMPSAT-1 and KOMPSAT-2 satellites, it takes its name from the popular Korean folk song Arirang. Its launch was the culmination of a project begun in 1995.

KOMPSAT-3 orbits at a height of 685.1 km (425.7 mi), circling the Earth 14 times per day, and is expected to maintain that orbit for 4 years. It weighs 980 kg (2,160 lb). The satellite carries an Advanced Earth Imaging Sensor System (AEISS), which can distinguish to a 70-cm resolution, allowing the identification of individual vehicles on the ground.

The satellite was succeeded by KOMPSAT-5 and KOMPSAT-3A, which were launched on 2013 and 2015 respectively.

== History ==
South Korea started the KOMPSAT programme in 1995 to nurture its national Earth-imaging industry and supply services for remote-sensing applications. The South Korean KOMPSAT-3 Earth-imaging satellite was developed by Korea Aerospace Industries (KAI) and Korea Aerospace Research Institute (KARI), in partnership with EADS Astrium, to assure continuity with the KOMPSAT-2 satellite launched in 2006. KOMPSAT-3 was orbited on 17 May 2012 by a launch vehicle from Tanegashima Space Center, Japan. SI Imaging Services is the worldwide exclusive distributor of KOMPSAT imagery since November 2012.

== Technologies ==
=== Orbit ===
KOMPSAT-3 operates in a near-polar, circular Sun-synchronous orbit. The orbital parameters are:

- Mean altitude: 685.1 km
- Mass: 980 kg
- Inclination: 98.13° (Sun-synchronous orbit)
- Orbital period: 98.5 minutes
- Orbital cycle: 28 days

=== Instruments ===
KOMPSAT-3's instruments are designed to acquire high- and very-high-resolution imagery with a footprint of 16.8 km. The satellite has the capacity to acquire 20 minutes of imagery on each orbit and it can steer its sensors both ways out to 30° off track. Panchromatic and multispectral images can be acquired at the same time.

KOMPSAT-3 radiometer features:

Kompsat-3 radiometric parameters
mode	Channel	Spectral band	Spatial resolution	Footprint
Multispectral	1	0.45 - 0.52 μm (blue)	2.8 m	16.8 km
	2	0.52 - 0.60 μm (green)	2.8 m	16.8 km
	3	0.63 - 0.69μm (rouge)	2.8 m	16.8 km
	4	0.76 - 0.90 μm (near-infrared)	2.8 m	16.8 km
Panchromatic	P	0.50 - 0.90 μm (black and white)	70 cm	16.8 km

=== Ground receiving stations ===
Two receiving stations deliver KOMPSAT-3 imagery 1 to 3 days after acquisition. The Deajeon station in South Korea is responsible for tasking the satellite.

== Advantages and applications of KOMPSAT-3 imagery ==
KOMPSAT-3 is designed for very-high-resolution (VHR) remote-sensing applications, such as:

- Land planning: to detect and identify features smaller than 1 square meter, e.g. vehicles, street furnishings, roads and bushes
- Agriculture: to pinpoint crop or tree diseases
- Urban planning and demographics: to locate detached houses
- Civil engineering: to plan road, railroad and oil pipeline corridors
- Defence: to describe high-value assets or military sites

== South Korea ==
It serves along with the existing Kompsat-2 to provide continuous satellite observation of the Korean Peninsula, sending images twice a day at 01:30 and 13:30.

== See also ==
- STSAT-2
- GIS
- Remote sensing
- Korean Aerospace Research Institute
