= KOMPSAT-5 =

South Korean reconnaissance satellite

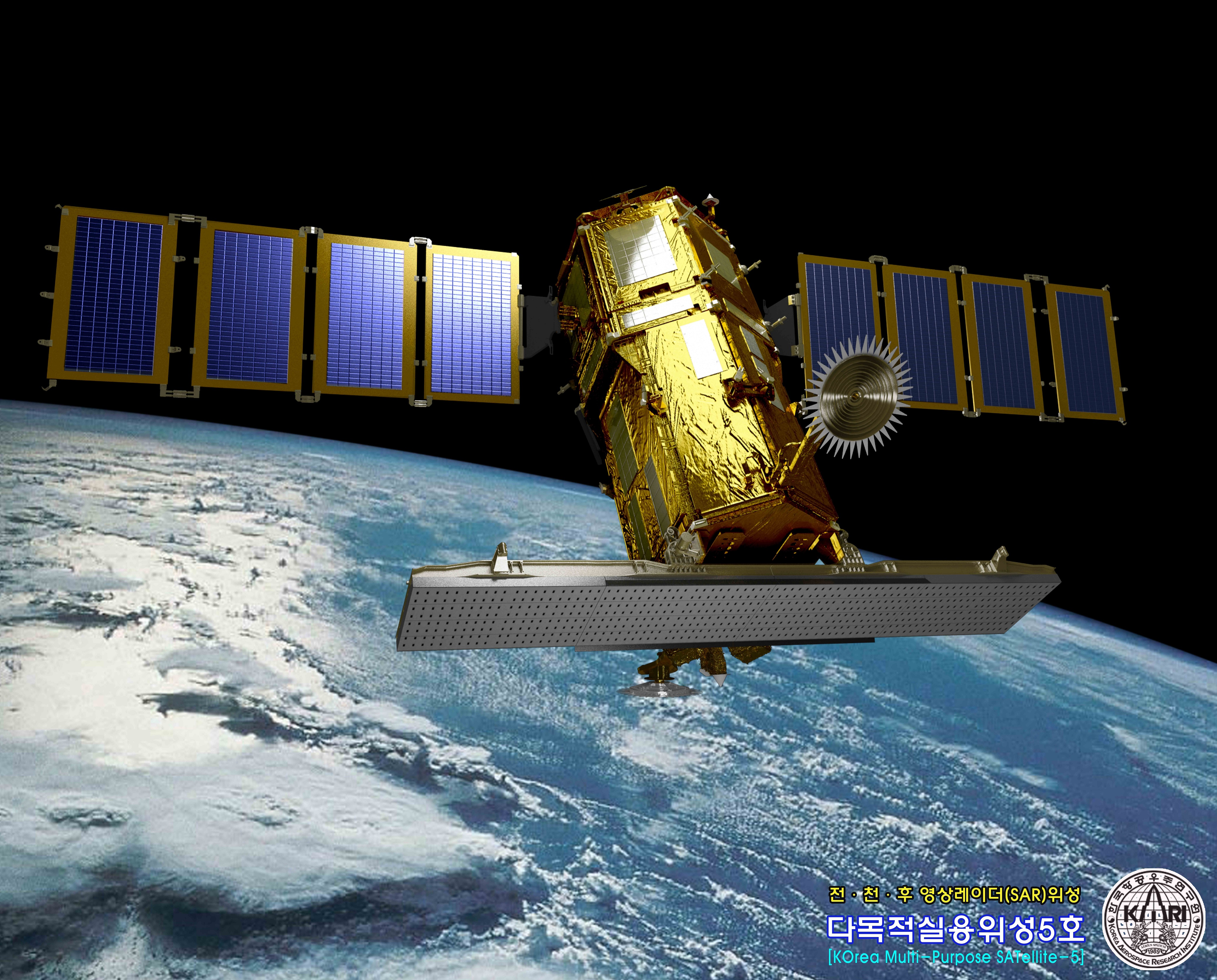
- Names: Korean Multi-purpose Satellite-5; Arirang-5
- Mission type: Earth observation
- Operator: Korea Aerospace Research Institute
- COSPAR ID: 2013-042A
- SATCAT no.: 39227
- Mission duration: 5 years (planned); 12 years and 8 months (in progress)

Spacecraft properties
- Spacecraft type: KOMPSAT
- Manufacturer: Korea Aerospace Industries, several private companies
- Launch mass: 1,400 kg (3,100 lb)
- Dimensions: 2.6 m in diameter x 3.7 m in height
- Power: 6.7 kW

Orbital parameters
- Regime: Sun-synchronous orbit
- Altitude: 550 km (340 mi)

KOMPSAT-5 (Korean Multi-purpose Satellite-5), also known as Arirang-5, is a South Korean observation satellite launched by Korea Aerospace Research Institute on August 22, 2013. It is a low-orbit satellite with an operational orbit of 550 km.

== Development ==
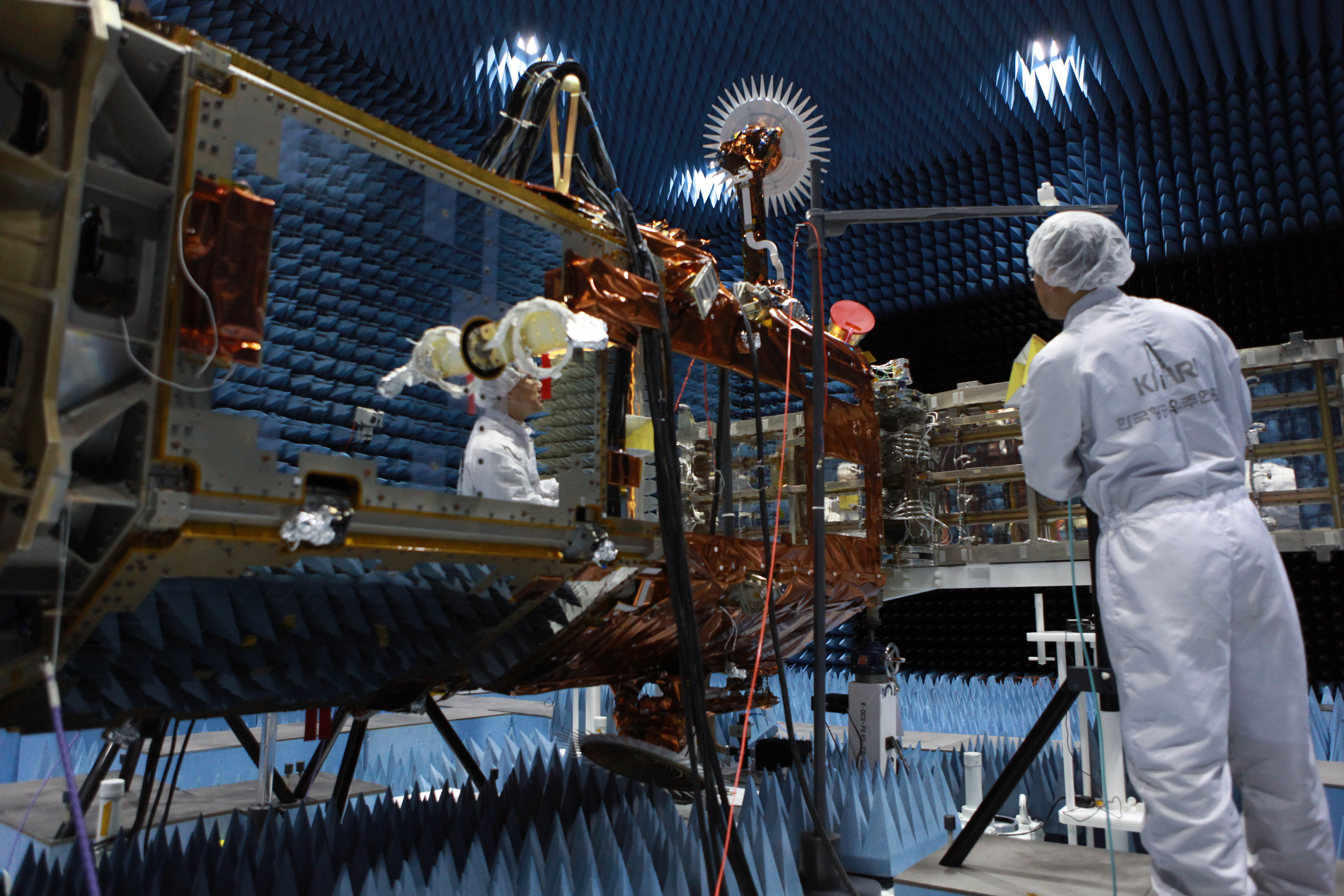
KOMPSAT-5 under electromagnetic wave testing

KOMPASAT-5 was developed with a total project cost of 238.1 billion won from June 2005. The Ministry of Science, ICT and Future Planning, the Ministry of Trade, Industry and Energy, etc. jointly initiated the project, and related industries such as the Korea Aerospace Research Institute, Korea Aerospace Industries, Korean Air, Hanwha, Doosan Heavy Industries, and Satrec Initiative participated in the development.

== Technology ==
It is the first South Korean satellite to be equipped with a synthetic-aperture radar, making it an all-weather Earth observation satellite that can precisely observe the Earth in high resolution even in bad weather such as cloudy days and at night. Its operational orbit is 550 km.

While the existing KOMPSAT-2 and KOMPSAT-3 use visible light and they cannot observe the ground on dark nights or cloudy days, KOMPSAT-5 is equipped with a SAR uses microwaves and can penetrate clouds.

== Mission ==
Launch of Arirang 5

Development was completed in 2010, but its launch was delayed for over two years. It was finally launched into space from the Yasny launch base at 8:39 p.m. (11:39 p.m. KST) on August 22, 2013, and successfully made its first contact with the Troll Satellite Station approximately 32 minutes after launch. 1 hour and 27 minutes after launch, it successfully established communication with the ground station in Svalbard, Norway, and 5 hours and 56 minutes later (5:36 a.m. KST), it successfully established its first communication with the ground station at the KARI Satellite Information Research Center in Daejeon, confirming the success of the launch.

Its main mission is to observe the Korean Peninsula twice a day, day and night, from an altitude of 550 km, to monitor disasters such as marine oil spills and volcanic eruptions, and to build a Geographic information system. It can obtain photos with a resolution of up to 1 m when calibrated.

As of August 2018, It has orbited the Earth approximately 27,000 times over five years, communicated with ground stations 7,000 times, and provided over 127,000 photos through a total of 58,440 shots. In particular, the images provided in disaster situations such as floods, droughts, wildfires, earthquakes, and marine oil spills were evaluated to be of great help in rapid response, and images were also provided to various public and private services related to public safety and land and resource management.

It was originally launched with a mission life of 5 years and the goal of operation until August 22, 2018. However, in August 2018, a review committee formed by the Ministry of Science and ICT and the KARI conducted a technical inspection and determined that additional mission performance was possible, extending the operation period by 2 years.

== See also ==
- South Korean space program
