= CAS500 =

South Korean satellite launched in 2021

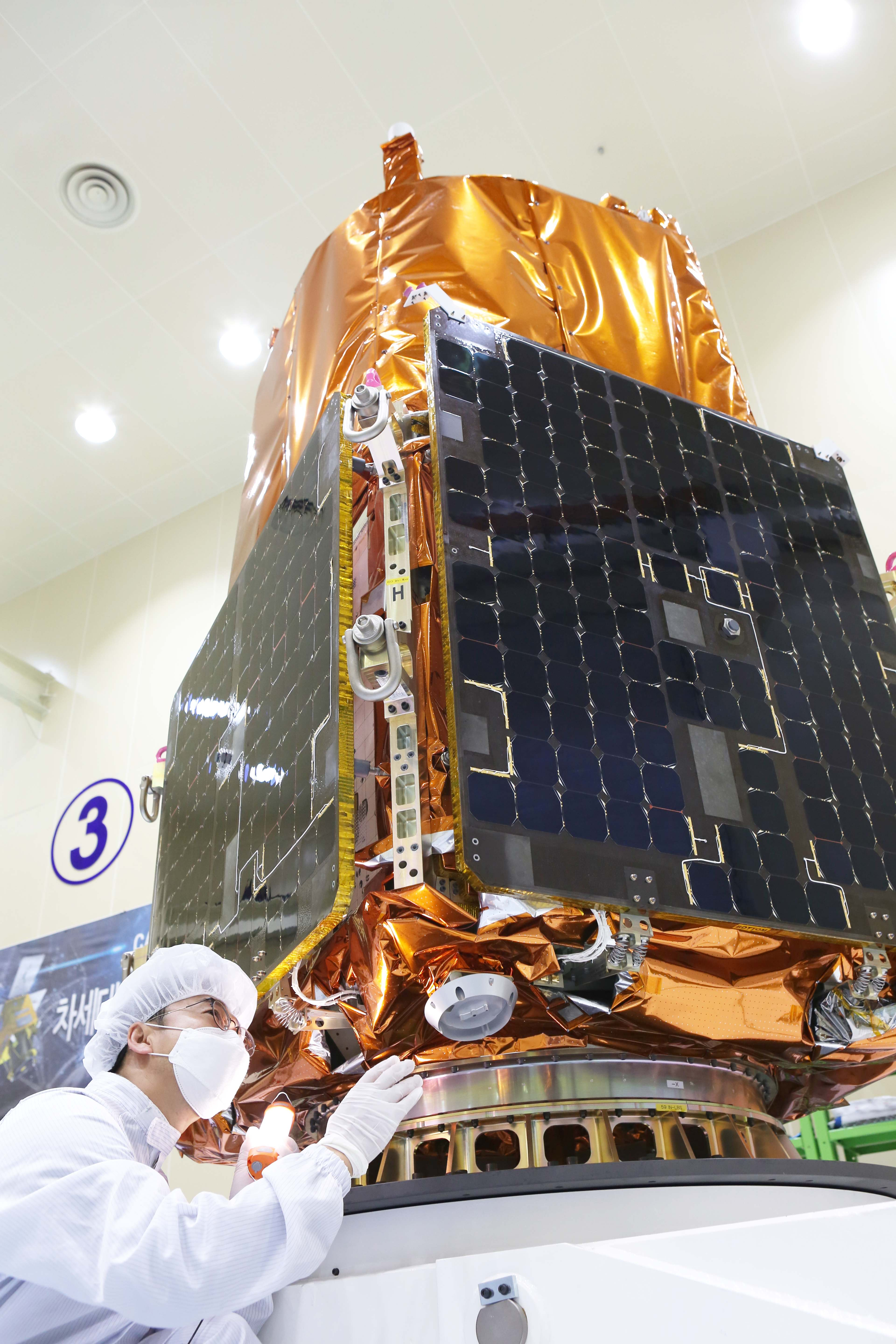
- Image of CAS500-1 satellite before launch
- Country of origin: South Korea
- Operator: KARI
- Applications: Earth observation

Specifications
- Bus: CAS500
- Launch mass: 500 kg (1,100 lb)
- Regime: SSO

Production
- Status: In Production
- Built: 5
- Launched: 4
- Maiden launch: 22 March 2021

CAS500 (Compact Advanced Satellite 500) is a series of Earth observation satellites developed by the Korea Aerospace Research Institute (KARI).

== Satellites ==
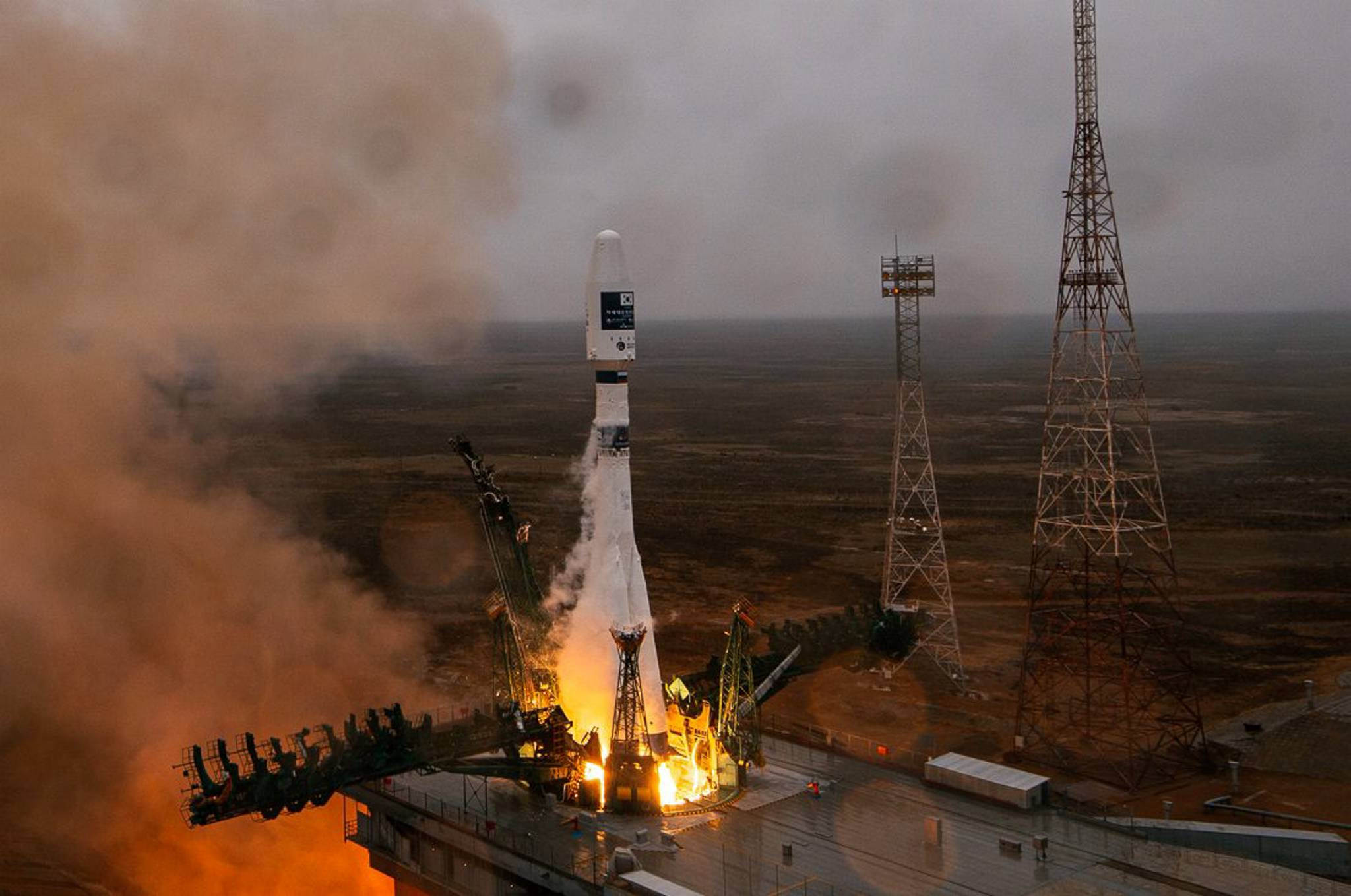
Launch of CAS500-1

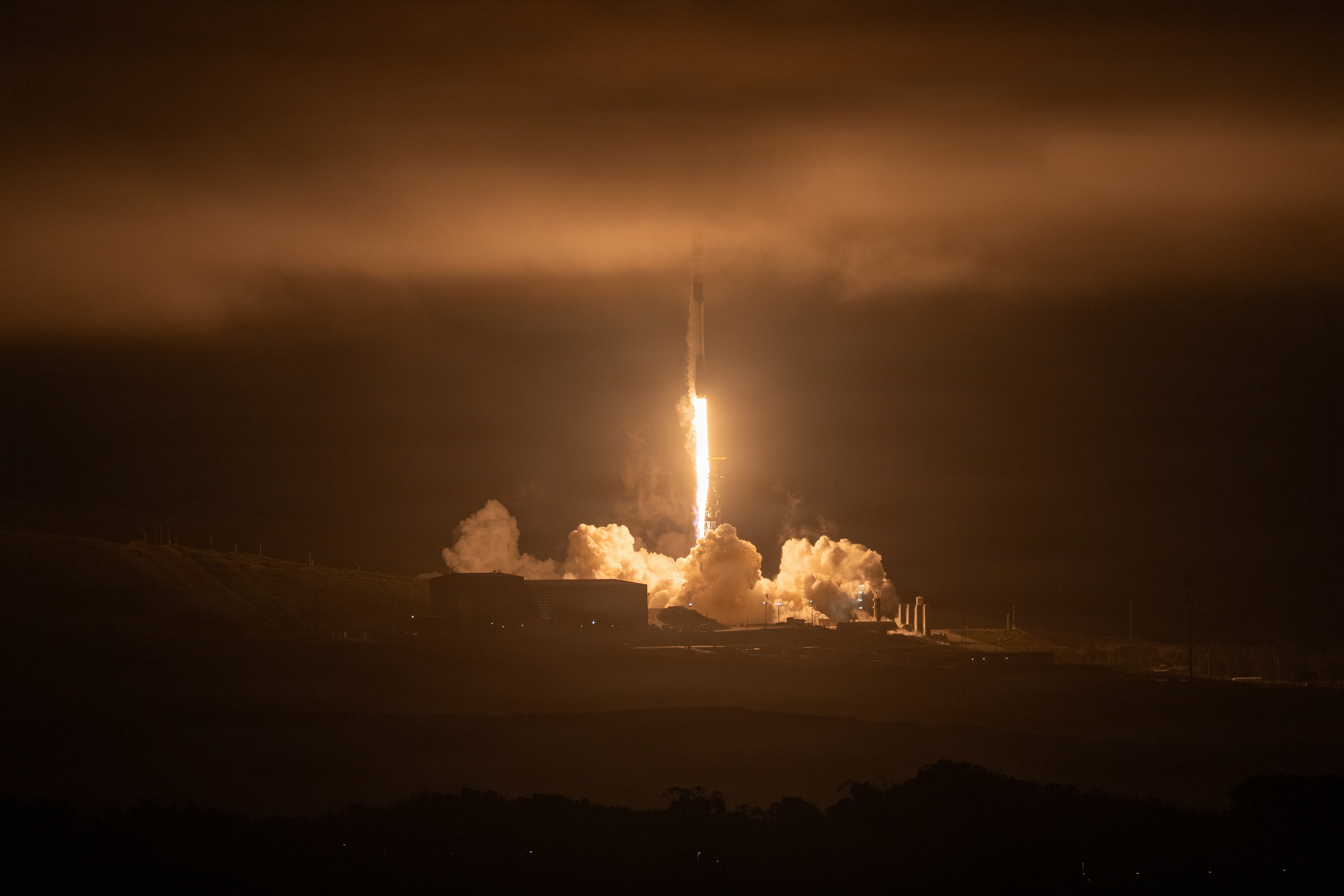
Launch of CAS500-4

CAS500-1, (Korean: 국토위성 1호, transl. "Land Satellite No. 1"), is a prototype 500-kilogram (1,100 lb) class Earth observation satellite that was launched by South Korea at the Baikonur Cosmodrome on 22 March 2021. It is in a 500-kilometre (310 mi) Sun-synchronous orbit, inclined by 97.7 degrees or 15 orbits/day.

CAS500-2 was expected to launch in 2022 also on a Russian rocket, but the launch was cancelled after the Russian invasion of Ukraine. The satellite was rescheduled to launch together with CAS500-4 on a SpaceX Falcon 9 rocket and later moved to another Falcon 9 flight which launched on 3 May 2026 at 7:00 UTC.

CAS500-3 was launched on 26 November 2025 on the South Korean launch vehicle Nuri. CAS500-3 is not an Earth-observation satellite and instead carries three science instruments: a wide-field camera for observing auroras, a plasma and magnetic field monitoring instrument, and a medical 3D bioprinter.

CAS500-4, carrying a wide-area Earth-observation camera, was launched on the Transporter-17 flight of Falcon 9 on 7 July 2026.
