= Arirang bond =

Won-denominated bond

- Hangul: 아리랑 본드; 아리랑 채권
- Hanja: (none); 아리랑 債券
- RR: arirang bondeu; arirang chaegwon
- MR: arirang pondŭ; arirang ch'aekwŏn

An Arirang bond is a won-denominated bond issued by a foreign entity in South Korea. The name refers to "Arirang," a Korean folk song. The market for Arirang bonds is extremely small, constituting less than 0.2% of corporate bond issuance in South Korea. The Asian Development Bank was the first to issue Arirang bonds, with a 1995 issue of ₩80 billion worth of seven-year bonds.
