= KOMPSAT-2 =

South Korean Earth observation satellite

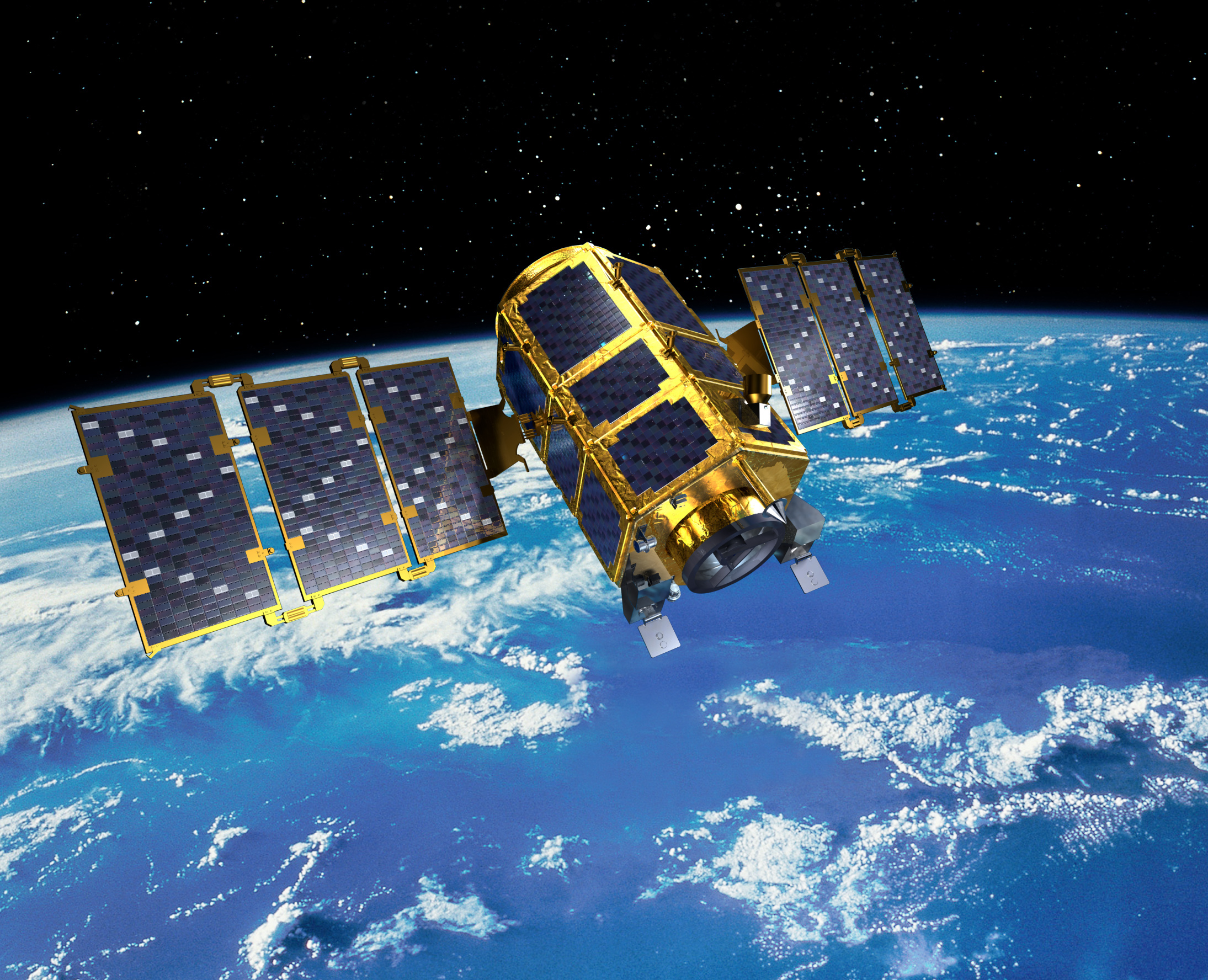
- Names: Korean Multi-purpose Satellite-2; Arirang-2
- Mission type: Earth observation
- Operator: Korea Aerospace Research Institute
- COSPAR ID: 2006-031A
- SATCAT no.: 29258
- Mission duration: 3 years (planned); 19 years, 9 months and 19 days (in progress)

Spacecraft properties
- Spacecraft type: KOMPSAT
- Manufacturer: Korea Aerospace Industries; Korea Aerospace Research Institute; EADS Astrium (bus)
- Launch mass: 800 kg (1,800 lb)
- Dimensions: 1.85 m diameter x 2.6 m in height x 6.8 m length (deployed configuration)
- Power: 955 watts

Start of mission
- Launch date: 28 July 2006, 07:05:43 UTC
- Rocket: Rokot/Briz-KM
- Launch site: Plesetsk, Site 133/3
- Contractor: Khrunichev State Research and Production Space Center

Orbital parameters
- Reference system: Geocentric orbit
- Regime: Sun-synchronous orbit
- Altitude: 685 km (426 mi)
- Inclination: 98.13°
- Period: 98.46 minutes

Instruments
- Multispectral Camera (MSC)

KOMPSAT-2 (Korean Multi-purpose Satellite-2), also known as Arirang-2, is a South Korean multipurpose Earth observation satellite. It was launched from Plesetsk Cosmodrome, Russia at 07:45:43 UTC (16:05:43 KST) on 28 July 2006. It began to transmit signals at 14:00 UTC (23:00 KST) the same day. Like the earlier KOMPSAT-1 satellite, it takes its name from the popular Korean folk song Arirang. Its launch was the culmination of a project begun in 1995.

KOMPSAT-2 orbits at a height of 685 km (426 mi), circling the Earth 14 times per day, and is expected to maintain that orbit for 3 years. It weighs 800 kg (1,800 lb). The satellite carries a Multispectral Camera (MSC) which can distinguish to a 100-cm resolution, allowing the identification of individual vehicles on the ground. The satellite was succeeded by KOMPSAT-3, KOMPSAT-5 and KOMPSAT-3A, which were launched in 2012, 2013 and 2015 respectively.

== History ==
South Korea started the KOMPSAT programme in 1995 to nurture its national Earth-imaging industry and supply services for remote-sensing applications. The South Korean KOMPSAT-2 Earth-imaging satellite was developed by Korea Aerospace Industries (KAI) and Korea Aerospace Research Institute (KARI), in partnership with EADS Astrium, to assure continuity with the KOMPSAT-1 satellite launched in 1999. KOMPSAT-2 was orbited on 28 July 2006 by a launch vehicle from Plesetsk, Russia. Spot Image was the distributor of KOMPSAT-2 imagery until April 2011. SI Imaging Services is the worldwide exclusive distributor of KOMPSAT imagery including KOMPSAT-2 since November 2012.

== Technologies ==
=== Orbit ===
KOMPSAT-2 operates in a near-polar, circular Sun-synchronous orbit. The orbital parameters are:

- Mean altitude: 685 km
- Mass: 800 kg
- Inclination: 98.1° (Sun-synchronous orbit)
- Orbital period: 98.6 minutes
- Orbital cycle: 28 days

=== Instruments ===
KOMPSAT-2's instruments are designed to acquire high- and very-high-resolution imagery with a footprint of 15 km. The satellite has the capacity to acquire 20 minutes of imagery on each orbit and it can steer its sensors both ways out to 30° off track. Panchromatic and multispectral images can be acquired at the same time.

KOMPSAT-2 radiometer features:

Kompsat-2 radiometric parameters
mode	Channel	Spectral band	Spatial resolution	Footprint
Multispectral	1	0.45 - 0.52 μm (blue)	4 m	15 km
	2	0.52 - 0.60 μm (green)	4 m	15 km
	3	0.63 - 0.69μm (rouge)	4 m	15 km
	4	0.76 - 0.90 μm (near-infrared)	4 m	15 km
Panchromatic	P	0.50 - 0.90 μm (black and white)	1 m	15 km

=== Ground receiving stations ===
Two receiving stations deliver KOMPSAT-2 imagery 1 to 3 days after acquisition and in under 24 hours in Europe. The Deajeon station in South Korea is responsible for tasking the satellite. The Toulouse station in France is responsible for updating the catalogue, producing imagery and delivering it to its customers.

== Advantages and applications of KOMPSAT-2 imagery ==
KOMPSAT-2 is designed for very-high-resolution (VHR) remote-sensing applications, such as:

- Land planning: to detect and identify features smaller than 1 square meter, e.g. vehicles, street furnishings, roads and bushes
- Agriculture: to pinpoint crop or tree diseases
- Urban planning and demographics: to locate detached houses
- Civil engineering: to plan road, railroad and oil pipeline corridors
- Defence: to describe high-value assets or military sites

== North Korea ==
It serves along with the existing Kompsat-2 to provide continuous satellite observation of the Korean Peninsula, sending images twice a day at 1:30 and 13:30.

== Mission ==
In October 2015, the Ministry of Science, ICT and Future Planning (MSIP) and KARI made plans about the future of the KOMPSAT-2 mission which is on orbit for more than 9 years. It was decided not to extend the KOMPSAT-2 mission any further for systematic observation services, but instead use it for research purposes until the end of its life cycle. Although KOMPSAT-2 was originally designed to have a life cycle of 3 years, this was extended three times (by two years each time, for a total of 6 years) by applying highly reliable satellite technology. KOMPSAT-2 has successfully carried out its mission of obtaining images of the Korean Peninsula and other major areas of the world over a period of nine years. KOMPSAT-2 is used in next-generation satellite technology research without any further extension of its mission until the end of its life cycle, as its operation systems - such as its payload module, sensor, and Earth station operation system (command transmission and satellite condition analysis) - are aged.

== See also ==
- STSAT-2
- GIS
- Remote sensing
- Korean Aerospace Research Institute
