= KOMPSAT =

South Korean multipurpose satellite

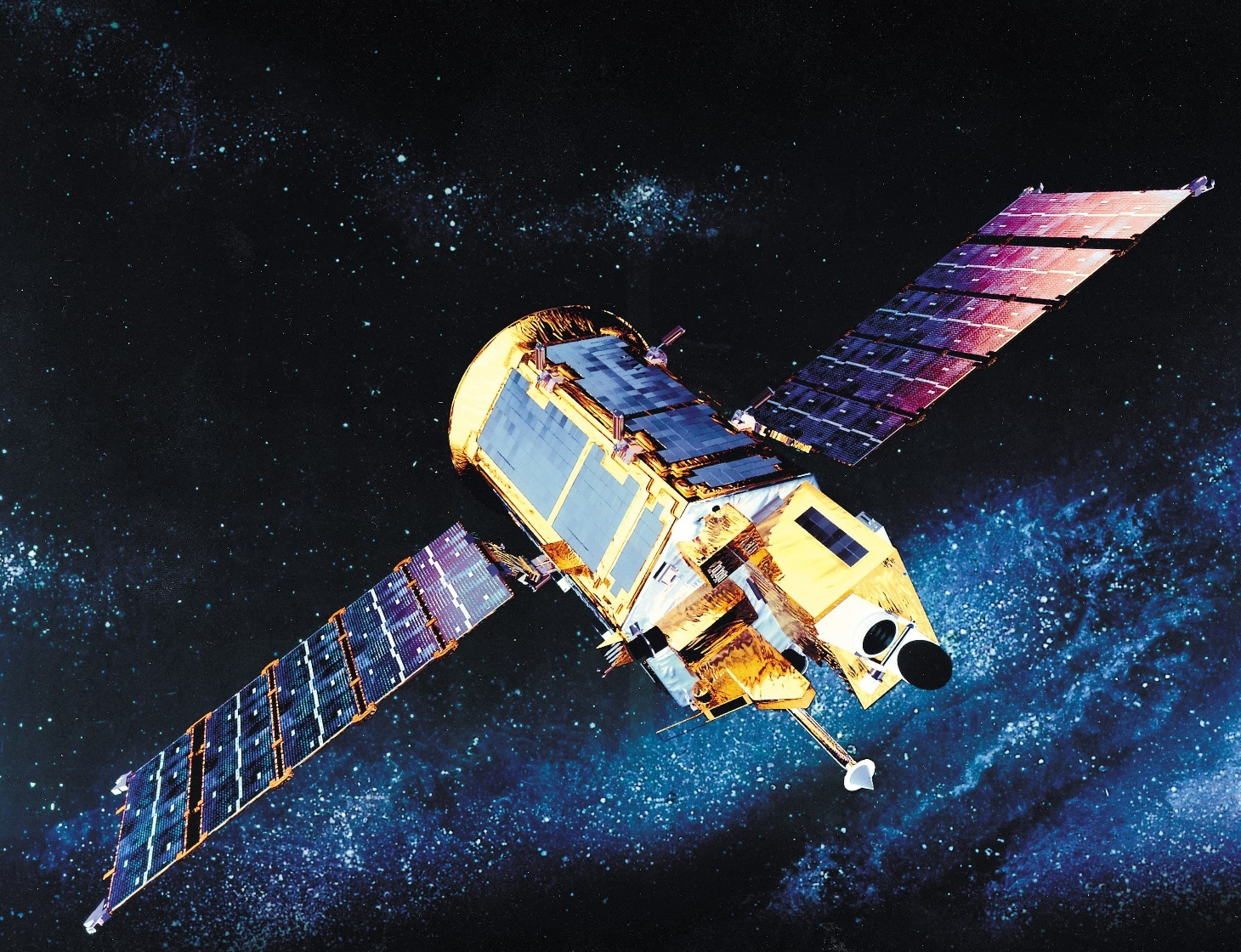
An artist rendering of the KOMPSAT-1

KOMPSAT or Korean Multi-Purpose Satellite is a series of South Korean multipurpose satellite for Earth observation, communications, meteorological, environmental, agricultural, and oceanographic monitoring applications.

== Satellites ==
Designation	Other name	COSPAR ID	SATCAT	Launch Date (UTC)	Launch vehicle	Launch site	Orbit	Status	Remarks	Refs
KOMPSAT-1	Arirang-1	1999-070A	26032	21 December 1999; 07:13	Taurus	Vandenberg Air Force Base, United States	SSO	Deactivated		
KOMPSAT-2	Arirang-2	2006-031A	29268	29 July 2006; 07:05:43	Rokot-KM	Plesetsk Cosmodrome, Russia	SSO	Active		
KOMPSAT-3	Arirang-3	2012-025B	38338	17 May 2012; 16:39	H-IIA	Tanegashima Space Center, Japan	SSO	Active		
KOMPSAT-5	Arirang-5	2013-042A	39227	22 August 2013	Dnepr	Dombarovskiy Launch Site, Russia	SSO	Active		
KOMPSAT-3A	Arirang-3A	2015-014A	40536	25 March 2015	Dnepr	Dombarovsky Launch Site, Russia	SSO	Active		
GEO-KOMPSAT-1	COMS-1 or Cheollian-1	2010-032A	36744	26 June 2010	Ariane 5	Centre Spatial Guyanais, French Guiana	GEO	Deactivated		
GEO-KOMPSAT-2A	Cheollian-2A	2018-100A	43823	4 December 2018	Ariane 5	Centre Spatial Guyanais, French Guiana	GEO	Active		
GEO-KOMPSAT-2B	Cheollian-2B	2020-013B	45246	18 February 2020	Ariane 5	Centre Spatial Guyanais, French Guiana	GEO	Active		
KOMPSAT-7	Arirang-7			1 December 2025	Vega-C	Centre Spatial Guyanais, French Guiana	SSO	Active		
KOMPSAT-6	Arirang-6			Q2 2027	Vega-C	Centre Spatial Guyanais, French Guiana	SSO	Planned		
KOMPSAT-7A	Arirang-7A			November 2026	Falcon 9 Block 5	Cape Canaveral, Florida	SSO	Planned		
GEO-KOMPSAT-3	Cheollian-3			H2 2027	Falcon 9 Block 5	Cape Canaveral, Florida	GEO	Planned		
