= KOMPSAT-1 =

1999–2008 South Korean satellite

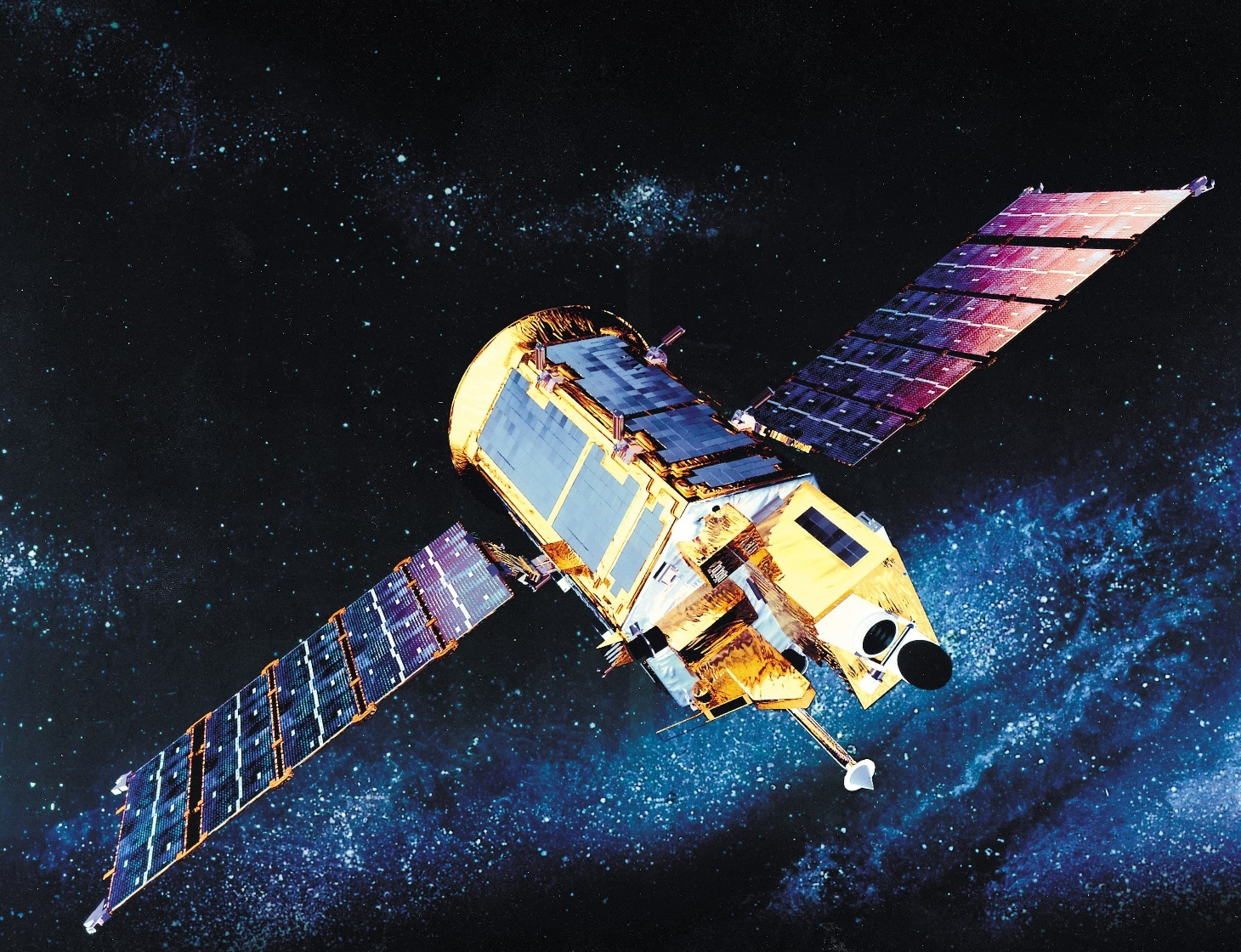
- Names: Korean Multi-purpose Satellite-1; Arirang-1
- Mission type: Earth observation
- Operator: Korea Aerospace Research Institute
- COSPAR ID: 1999-070A
- SATCAT no.: 26032
- Mission duration: 3 years (planned); 8 years (achieved)

Spacecraft properties
- Spacecraft type: KOMPSAT
- Bus: TOMS-EP
- Manufacturer: Korea Aerospace Industries; Korea Aerospace Research Institute; TRW (bus)
- Launch mass: 470 kg (1,040 lb)
- Dimensions: 1.33 m (4 ft 4 in) in diameter 2.33 m (7 ft 8 in) in length
- Power: 636 watts

Start of mission
- Launch date: 21 December 1999, 07:13 UTC
- Rocket: Taurus 2110
- Launch site: Vandenberg, LC-576E
- Contractor: Orbital Sciences Corporation

End of mission
- Deactivated: 31 January 2008
- Last contact: 30 December 2007

Orbital parameters
- Reference system: Geocentric orbit
- Regime: Sun-synchronous orbit
- Altitude: 685 km (426 mi)
- Inclination: 98.13°
- Period: 98.46 minutes

Instruments
- Electro-Optical Camera (EOC); High Energy Particles Detector (HEPD); Ionospheric Measurement Sensor (IMS)

KOMPSAT-1 (Korean Multi-purpose Satellite-1), also known as Arirang-1, was a satellite created by the Korea Aerospace Industries (KAI) and Korea Aerospace Research Institute (KARI), and launched by a United States launch vehicle on 21 December 1999. This was the first satellite built primarily by South Korean engineers, although previous foreign-built satellites had been launched by Korean companies. It took its name from the popular Korean folk song Arirang.

== Instruments ==
It carried an Electro-Optical Camera (EOC) able to distinguish objects with a diameter of 6.6 m (22 ft) with a footprint of 17 km. The satellite carried remote sensing instruments for providing digital cartography of Korea, and status of marine biology. Also included was the Ionospheric Measurement Sensor (IMS) to monitor ionospheric parameters along the satellite orbit and the High Energy Particles Detector (HEPD).

=== High Energy Particle Detector (HEPD) ===
The High Energy Particle Detector (HEPD) instrument consists of a Proton and Electron Spectrometer (PES), a Linear Energy transfer Spectrometer (LET), a Total Dose Monitor (TDM), and a Single Event Monitor (SEM), PES measures protons from 6.4 MeV to 38 MeV in 3 energy channels, electrons from 0.25 MeV to <2.0 MeV in 3 energy channels, and alpha particles from 15 MeV to 60 MeV in an energy channel. LET measures linear energy transfer. TDM measures total ionizing dose of radiation accumulated on RADFET dosimeters. SEM measures single event upset (SEU).

=== Ionospheric Measurement Sensor (IMS) ===
The Ionospheric Measurement Sensor (IMS) is composed of a Langmuir probe (LP) and of the Electron Temperature Probe (ETP) developed by K. Oyama (Institute of Space and Astronautical Science (ISAS), Japan). LP measures the in-situ electron temperature and density and ETP measures the in-situ electron temperature and floating potential. The instrument monitored the variation of the nighttime ionosphere along the satellite track until the unexpected power failure of the probes on 2 August 2001.

== Launch ==
The satellite was launched from Vandenberg Air Force Base in California on a Taurus 2110. It had been built in Daedeok Science Town in Daejeon, South Korea. The parts were shipped in three stages from Korea to California by First Express International, a Korean shipping firm.

The KOMPSAT-1 was succeeded by the KOMPSAT-2 in 2006.

== Mission ==
On 30 December 2007, the KARI reported that they had lost contact with the satellite. It is suspected to have had a malfunction that has affected power generation. After the loss of contact with the satellite, the mission was formally ended 31 January 2008.
