= Korea Aerospace Research Institute =

South Korean space agency

- 한국항공우주연구원

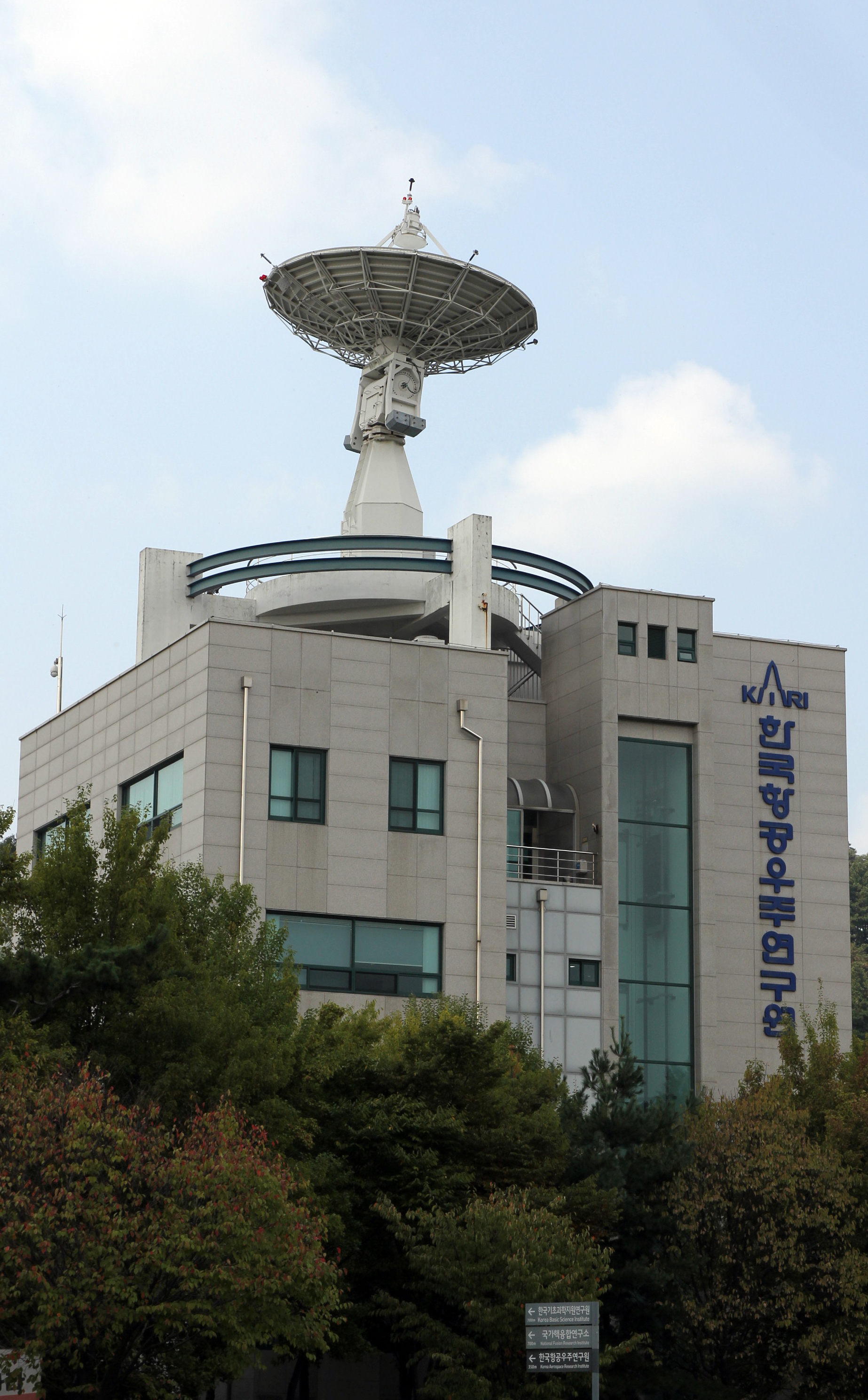
- KARI Headquarters in Daejeon

Agency overview
- Abbreviation: KARI
- Formed: 10 October 1989; 36 years ago
- Type: Space agency
- Headquarters: Daejeon, South Korea
- Motto: Aerius Spatium
- Administrator: Lee Sang-Ryool
- Primary spaceport: Naro Space Center
- Owners: National Research Council of Science & Technology
- Annual budget: ₩615 billion (US$553.1 million) (FY2021)
- Website: Official KARI website in English; Official KARI website in Korean

- Korea Aerospace Research Institute
- Hangul: 한국항공우주연구원
- Hanja: 韓國航空宇宙研究院
- RR: Hanguk hanggong uju yeonguwon
- MR: Han'guk hanggong uju yŏn'guwŏn

The Korea Aerospace Research Institute (KARI; Korean: 한국항공우주연구원), established in 1989, is the aeronautics and space agency of South Korea. Its main laboratories are located in Daejeon, in the Daedeok Science Town. KARI's vision is to continue building upon indigenous launch capabilities, strengthen national safety and public service, industrialize satellite information and applications technology, explore the Moon, and develop environmentally-friendly and highly-efficient cutting-edge aircraft and core aerospace technology. Current projects include the KSLV-2 launcher. Past projects include the 1999 Arirang-1 satellite. The agency was founded in 1989. Prior to South Korea's entry into the Institute for Advanced Engineering (IAE) in 1992, it focused primarily on aerospace technology. As of May 2024, KARI is an affiliated research institute of the Korea AeroSpace Administration.

== Background ==
KARI began on October 10, 1989, as a national aerospace research institute with the purpose of contributing to sound development of the national economy and enhancement of people's lives through a new exploration, technological advancement, development, and dissemination in the field of aerospace science and technology. It started its research in a temporary building, and had about 30 employees. In 1992, it was designated as a performance quality inspection specialized agency under the Aerospace Industry Development Promotion Act of the Ministry of Commerce, Industry and Energy, and in November 1996, it became an independent foundation called the Korea Aerospace Research Institute.

In 2001, it was renamed to the current Korea Aerospace Research Institute. In 2008, it was incorporated under the Basic Technology Research Council of the Ministry of Education, Science and Technology. In 2014, its affiliation was changed to the National Research Council of Science and Technology. In December 2016, it was selected as a national space development specialized agency.

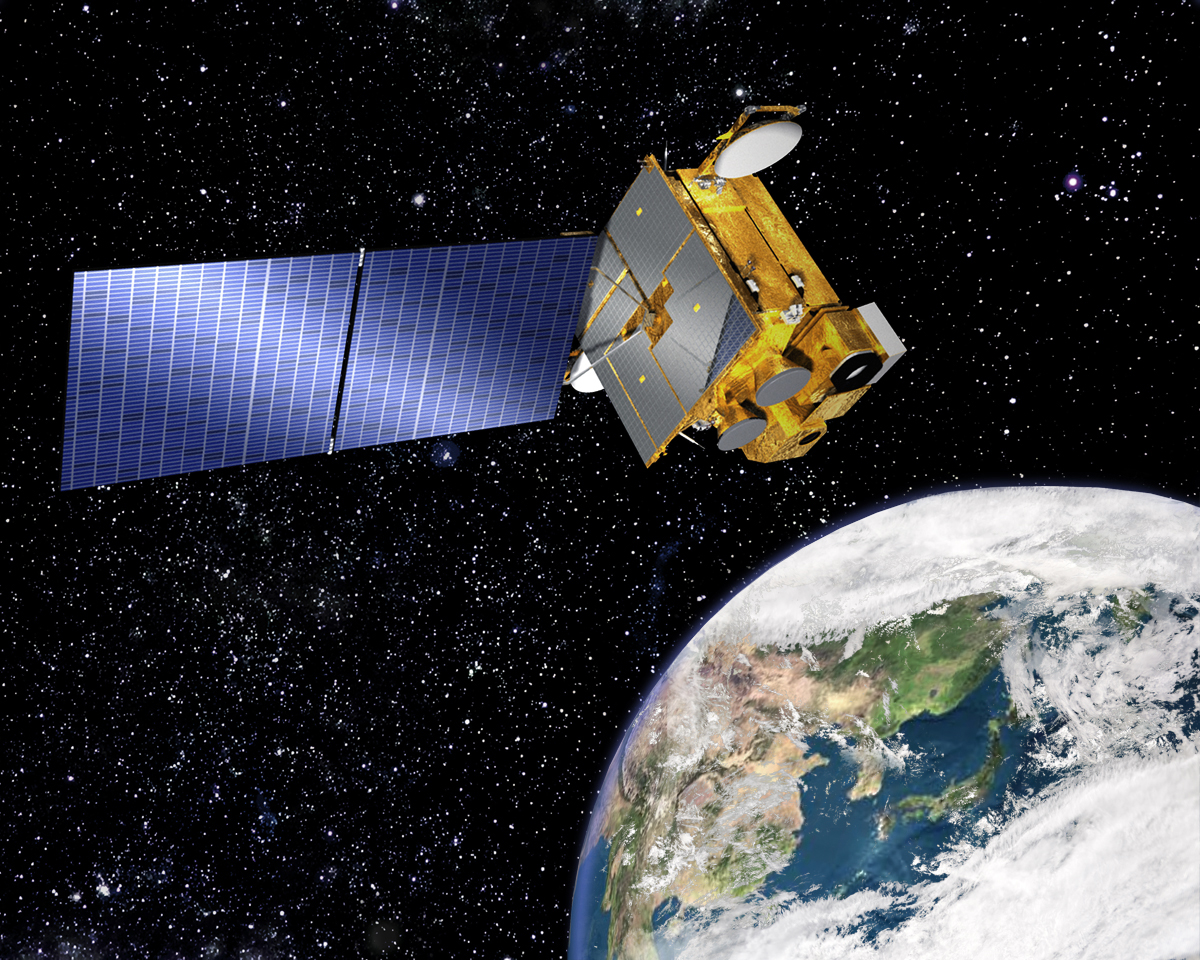
Communication, Ocean and Meteorological Satellite COMS-I

Timeline
- 1989.10 Establishment of KARI affiliated to Korea Institute of Machinery & Materials (KIMM)
- 1990.12 Cornerstone – Laying ceremony for the building of the institute
- 1992.07 Authorized as the Inspection Agency, designated by the AIDP Law
- 1992.10 Completion of construction of the research building complex
- 1993.04 Experimental Aircraft Kachi Development
- 1993.06.09 Launch of Single-stage Sounding Rocket (KSR-I)
- 1993.09 EXPO Unmanned Airship Development
- 1995. Korea launched its first communications satellite named Koreasat * 1996.11 Independent organization as KARI, an Incorporated Foundation
- 1997.03 Twin-engine composite Aircraft Development
- 1997.04 Authorized as the Type Certification Agency, designated by the Aviation Law
- 1998.06 Launch of Two-stage Sounding Rocket (KSR-II)
- 1999.01 Change of Type Certification Agency
- 1999.12 Launch of Korea Multiple Purpose Satellite (KOMPSAT I) also known as Arirang I
- 2001.01 Change of name to Korea Aerospace Research Institute
- 2001.09 Canard Aircraft Development
- 2002.11 Launch of Liquid-propellant Rocket (KSR-III)
- 2003.05 Cornerstone – laying ceremony for the Aircraft Flight Test Center
- 2003.08 Cornerstone – laying ceremony for the NARO Space Center
- 2003.09 Launch of STSAT (Science and Technology Satellite)-1
- 2003.10 Multi-Purpose Stratosphere unmanned-airship Development
- 2004.10 Completion of Jeju Island Tracking Station
- 2005.01 Installation of South pole ground station
- 2006.07 Launch of Korea Multi-Purpose Satellite (KOMPSAT 2) also known as Arirang II
- 2008.03 Transfer to Korea Research Council of Fundamental Science & Technology (KRCF)
- 2008.04 The first Korean astronaut
- 2008.12 Medium Aero stats Development
- 2009.06 Completion of NARO Space center
- 2009.08 The 1st launch of Korea's 1st space launch vehicle KSLV-1
- 2010.06 Launch of COMS
- 2010.06 The 2nd launch of Korea's 1st space launch vehicle KSLV-1
- 2011.11 Smart UAV Development
- 2012.05 Launch of Korea Multi-Purpose Satellite(KOMPSAT)-3
- 2012.06 Korean Utility Helicopter Surion Development
- 2013.01 The 3rd launch of Korea's 1st space launch vehicle KSLV-1
- 2013.08 Launch of Korea Multi-Purpose Satellite (KOMPSAT)-5
- 2013.11 STSAT(Science and Technology Satellite)-3 Development
- 2013.12 4KC-100 Development
- 2014.05 OPV Development
- 2014 Research on lunar exploration cooperation began
- 2015.03 Launch of Korea Multi-Purpose Satellite (KOMPSAT)-3A
- 2015.08 EAV-3 development
- 2015.12 The completion of KSLV-II's engine combustion test facility
- 2016.12 Designated as a National Space Development Agency
- 2018.11 Launch of Test Launch Vehicle(TLV)
- 2018.12 Launch of GK-2A(GEO-KOMPSAT-2A)

Mission and Major Functions
- Perform basic and applied studies in aerospace technology
1. Development of leading-edge technology aircraft, aircraft evaluation and testing, and support of national development projects
1. Research and development of comprehensive system and core technology of aircraft, satellite, and space launch vehicle
1. Support national aerospace development policy establishment, distribution, and diffusion of aerospace technology information
1. Development and KSLV(Korea Launching of Space Launch Vehicles) and Operation of Space Center
- Perform government-delegated tasks and support policy development
1. Development of technology for assuring aerospace safety and quality, and maintenance of legal quality certification and internationally recognized certification systems
2. Establishment and support of the National Aerospace Development Policy and dissemination of knowledge on aerospace technology
- Support industries and transfer technology
1. Joint utilization of testing facilities and equipment with industries and academia, and training of scientists and engineers
2. Transfer of technology from research and development and provisions for commercialization support

== Organization ==
The headquarters is located in Daedeok Innopolis in Daejeon, and has various aerospace-related test facilities, including subsonic wind tunnel test facilities, full-body structural test facilities, propulsion test facilities, aircraft control test facilities, and rotary wing test facilities.

- Naro Space Center

The Naro Space Center in Goheung, South Jeolla Province, has major rocket propulsion system test facilities, a launch pad, a tracking station, and launch operation facilities, and a launch pad for private space companies is also planned to be built within the center.

- Goheung Aviation Center

The center is equipped with a 0.7 km long runway, airships, small and unmanned aircraft test facilities, landing gear drop test facilities, and propeller test facilities. From 2003 to 2019, the Goheung Aviation Center conducted performance tests on 168 manned and unmanned aircraft over a period of 16 years, and 76,077 researchers visited the center.

- Tracking station

The Jeju Tracking Station is located in Seogwipo, Jeju Province, 200km away from the Naro Space Center, and is responsible for continuous tracking and information reception of space launch vehicles.

The Palau Tracking Station is equipped with a 7.3m diameter remote data receiving antenna and satellite communication network on a 28,000 m^{2} site. It can receive remote data and images such as real-time flight position, speed, attitude, stage separation, satellite separation signal, pressure, temperature, voltage, and current of launch vehicles or payloads, and can also receive data from launch vehicles that are more than 3,000 km away from the Naro Space Center.

- Deep Space Ground Station

The station communicates with a space probe, and is located in Yeoju, Gyeonggi Province. It communicates with the lunar orbiter that will orbit the Moon and conduct exploration activities. The antenna reflector sends out radio waves and collects the radio waves sent by the lunar orbiter.

Organization
- KARI Innovation Advisory Group
- External Relations and Cooperation Office
- International Cooperation Office
- Safety, Health and Security Office
- Overseas Contracts Office
- Auditing Division
- Public Relations Office
- Quality Management Office
- IT and Information Security Office
- Technology Commercialization Office
- Aeronautics Research Directorate
- Satellite Research Directorate
- NARO Space Center
- Management Support Directorate
- Strategy and Planning Directorate
- National Satellite Operation & Application Center
- KPS R&D Directorate
- Unmanned Vehicle Advanced Research Center
- SBAS Program Office
- Space Pioneer Program Office
- Strastopheric Drone Technology Development Center
- Future Innovation Research Center
- KARI Academy

== Developments ==
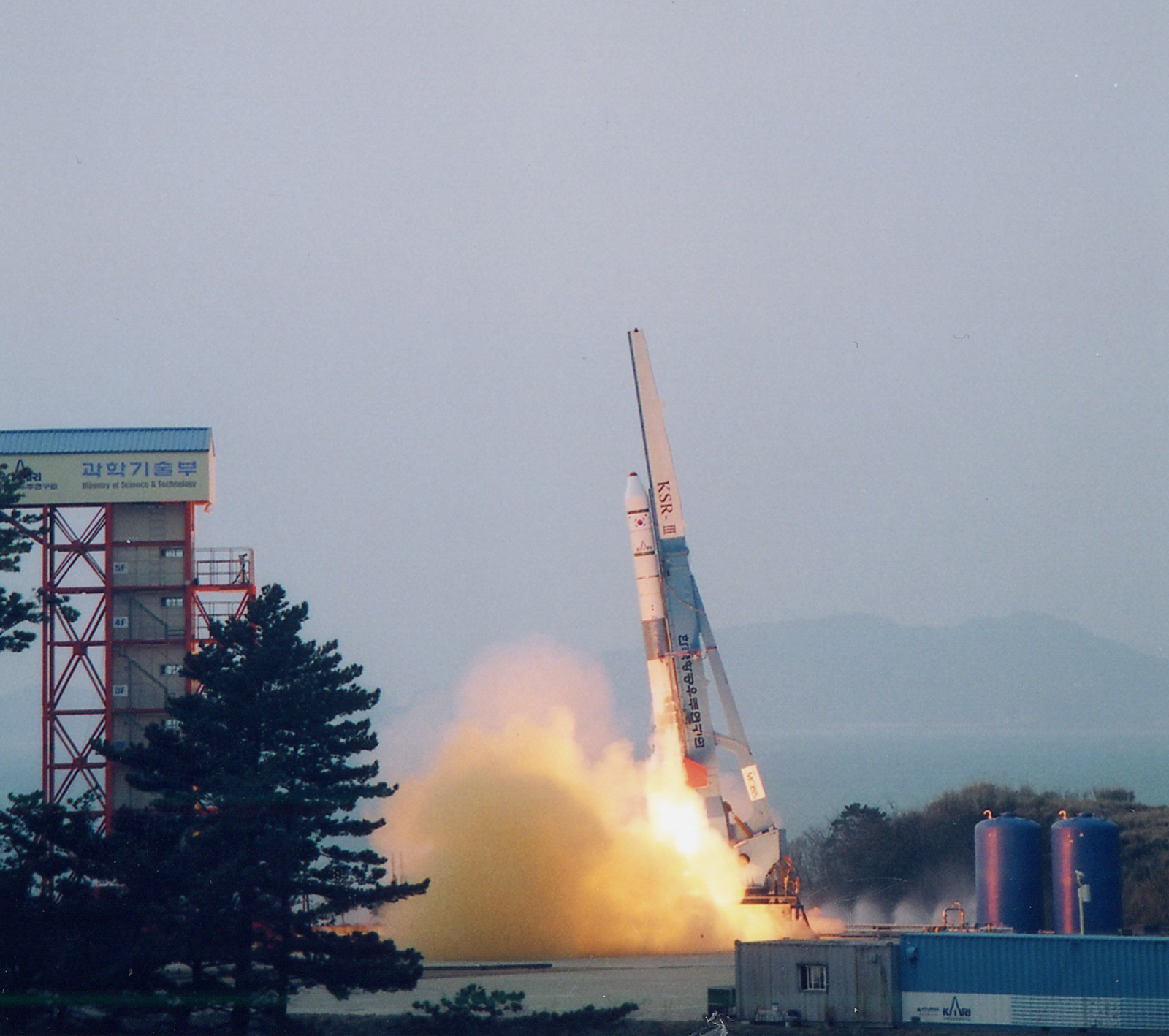
Liquid propulsion science rocket KARI KSR-3

KARI is also developing Unmanned Aerial Vehicles, high-altitude airships, a next-generation multi-purpose helicopter project, next- generation medium satellite, and a lunar exploration project. In addition, several satellites, including the KOMPSAT (also known as Arirang) Series, the COMS (Communication, Ocean and Meteorological Satellite), and the STSAT (Science and Technology Satellite), are developed, operated, or under development by KARI. On January 30, 2013, they launched a satellite into space from their own soil for the first time.

KARI began in 1989 to develop its own rockets (KSR, Korean Sounding Rocket). It produced the KSR-I and KSR-II, one and two-stage rockets in the early 1990s.

In December 1997 it began development of a LOX/kerosene rocket engine. KARI wished to develop satellite launch capability. A test launch of the KSR-III took place in 2002.

The first-stage unguided rocket KSR-I was produced by KARI in cooperation with research institutes such as industry, academia, and research institutes for the development of rockets. R&D took place for three years from 1990, and the total development cost was 2.85 billion won. Their goal was to develop a solid unguided science tube survey rocket that could observe the ozone layer over the Korean Peninsula.

=== Earth observation program ===
KSLV-1 launched on August 25, 2009. It was originally a cluster of indigenous liquid KSR-III rockets with a solid propellant to form a multistage launcher. However, KARI experienced more difficulties than expected in SLV development, because it required much stronger propellant power than KSR-III possessed to launch a satellite into orbit. After several failed attempts, KARI turned to Russia's Khrunichev Design Bureau for assistance in developing a liquid-propellant rocket engine for the KSLV-1 as well as for cooperation in the construction of the launch facility at the Naro Space Center. The first stage of the launcher was derived from the Russian URM-1 (Universal Rocket Module) developed by Khrunichev. The second stage of the launcher was a solid Kick Motor developed by Korea, which included the Inertial Navigation System; the power, control, and flight safety systems; plus the nose fairing. South Korea launched its next rocket, the KSLV-2 in 2021. The first stage of KSLV-II has 4 clustered engines, each of which has a 75 metric ton thrust. All three stages use indigenously developed rocket engines.

Active Missions: KSLV-1, KSLV-2, Koreasat, ANASIS-II

=== Satellite program ===
==== SaTReC ====
The KAIST's SaTReC, responsible for the nation's small scientific satellites.

KARI satellites	Type	Equipment	Orbit	Operational	Status
KOMPSAT 1 (Arirang 1)	Earth observation	EO	SSO	1999–2008	Retired
KOMPSAT 2 (Arirang 2)	Earth observation	EO	SSO	2006-2015	Retired
KOMPSAT 3 (Arirang 3)	Earth observation	EO	SSO	2012-	Active
KOMPSAT 3A (Arirang 3A)	Earth observation	EO/IR	SSO	2015-	Active
KOMPSAT 5 (Arirang 5)	Earth observation	SAR	SSO	2013-	Active
KOMPSAT 6 (Arirang 6)	Earth observation	SAR	SSO	2022	Planned
KOMPSAT 7 (Arirang 7)	Earth observation	EO/IR	SSO	2022	Planned
KOMPSAT 7A (Arirang 7A)	Earth observation	EO/IR	SSO	2024	Planned
CAS 500-1 (Compact Advanced Satellite 500)	Earth observation	EO	SSO	2021-	Active
CAS 500-2 (Compact Advanced Satellite 500)	Earth observation	EO	SSO	2022	Planned
GEO-KOMPSAT 1 (COMS 1, Cheollian 1)	Meteorology / Communication	Meteo Imager, Ocean colour Imager, S-/L-Band transponder, Ka-band transponders	GEO	2010-	Active
GEO-KOMPSAT 2A (GK 2A, Cheollian 2A)	Meteorology	AMI (Advanced Meteorological Imager) and KSEM (Korean Space Environment Monitor)	GEO	2018-	Active
GEO-KOMPSAT 2B (GK 2B, Cheollian 2B)	Meteorology	GOCI-II (Geostationary Ocean Color Imager-II) and GEMS (Environmental monitoring sensor)	GEO	2020-	Active
KPLO (Korea Pathfinder Lunar Orbiter)	Interplanetary Spacecraft	LUTI, PolCam, KMAG, KGRS, DTNPL, ShadowCam	Lunar orbiter	2022	Active

=== Korean Positioning System (KPS) ===
South Korea plans to spend 4 trillion won ($3.56 billion) on building its own Regional Navigation Satellite System (RNSS), named Korean Positioning System (KPS). It plans launching seven new satellites by 2035 — three into geosynchronous orbit and four into inclined geosynchronous orbit. South Korea and the U.S. signed an agreement on "civil global navigation satellite systems cooperation", under which the U.S. will support South Korea developing KPS. The two governments plan to work together to ensure compatibility and enhance interoperability of GPS and KPS for civil purposes.

=== Lunar and interplanetary missions ===
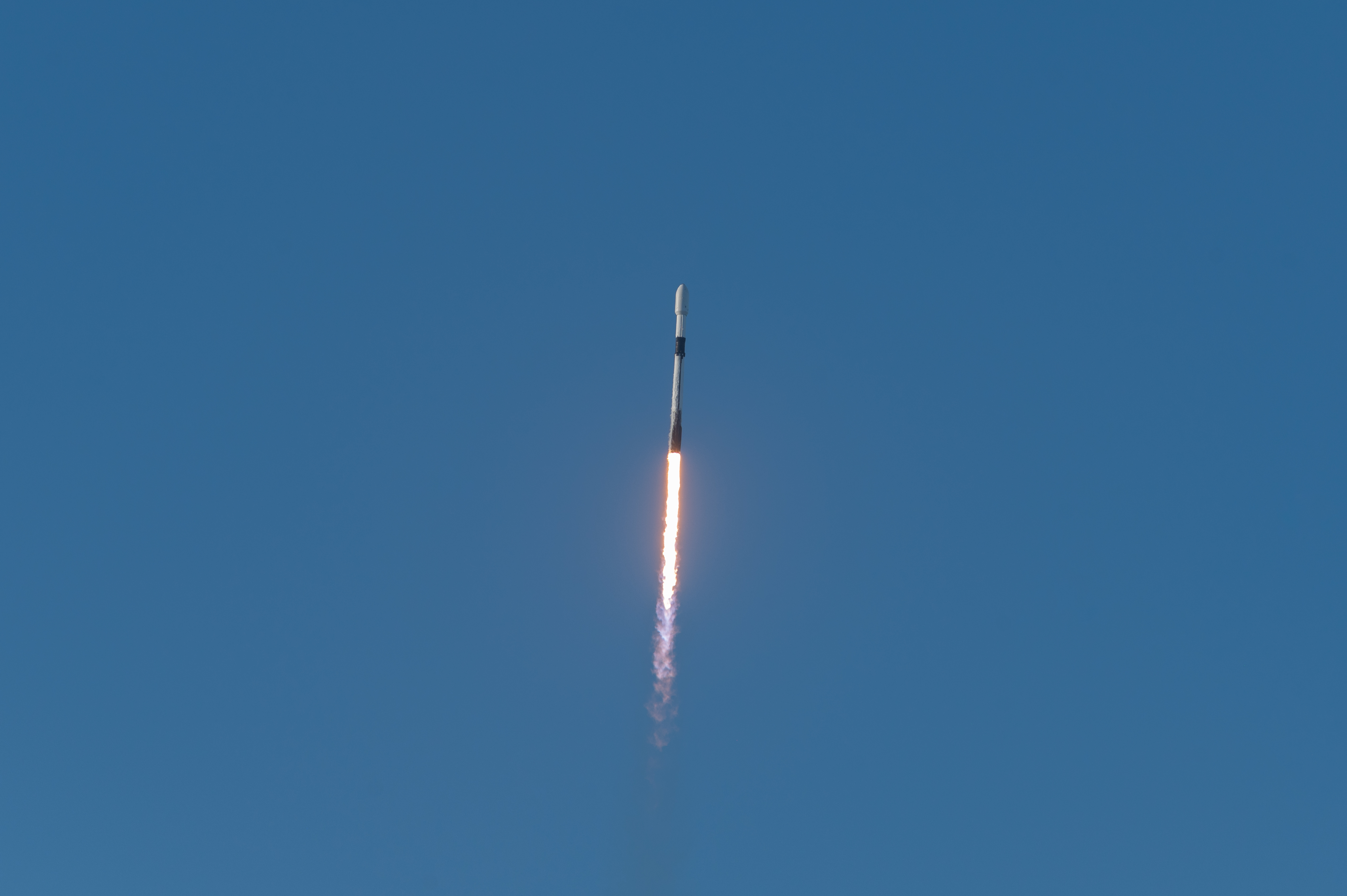
KPLO

The Korean Lunar Exploration Program (KLEP) is divided in two phases. Phase 1 incorporates the launch and operation of a lunar orbiter called Korea Pathfinder Lunar Orbiter (KPLO), which will be the first lunar probe by South Korea, meant to develop and enhance South Korea's technological capabilities, as well as map natural resources from orbit. In December 2016, KARI signed a lunar exploration technical cooperation with NASA which increased the possibility of exploration success greatly. Phase 2 will include a lunar orbiter, a lunar lander, and a rover to be launched together on a KSLV-II South Korean rocket from the Naro Space Center, by 2030.

KPLO will fly 100 kilometers above the Moon to carry out a lunar observation mission. The project will be carried out by KARI in charge of the system, the main body of the orbiter, and the ground station, and South Korean universities and research institutes will cooperate together.

=== Aircraft ===
==== Stratospheric airship ====
A 10-year program to develop a stratospheric airship for telecommunication relays and ground observations at 20 km altitude has started in December 2000.

==== Smart Tilt Rotor UAV ====
In late 2011, KARI unveiled its tiltrotor Unmanned Aerial Vehicle (UAV) that can fly at around 400 km/h.

==== High Altitude Long Endurance (HALE) Solar-powered Unmanned Aerial Vehicle (UAV) ====
KARI is developing an electric-driven HALE UAV in order to secure system and operational technologies since 2010.

==== Optionally Piloted Personal Air Vehicle (OPPAV) ====
KARI leads the research and development program to develop a one-seat class electric VTOL (eVTOL) demonstrator. Flight tests of a sub-scale technology demonstrator will be started by 2021.

== Future missions ==
=== Launch schedule ===
==== FY 2025 ====
- CAS500-2
- CAS500-3
- CAS500-4
- KSLV-II-4

==== FY 2026 ====
- KSLV-II-5

==== FY 2027 ====
- COMS-3
- KSLV-II-6

==== FY 2029 ====
- COMS-4

==== FY 2030 ====
- KSLV-III-1

==== FY 2032 ====
- Korean Lunar Exploration Program

== Gallery ==
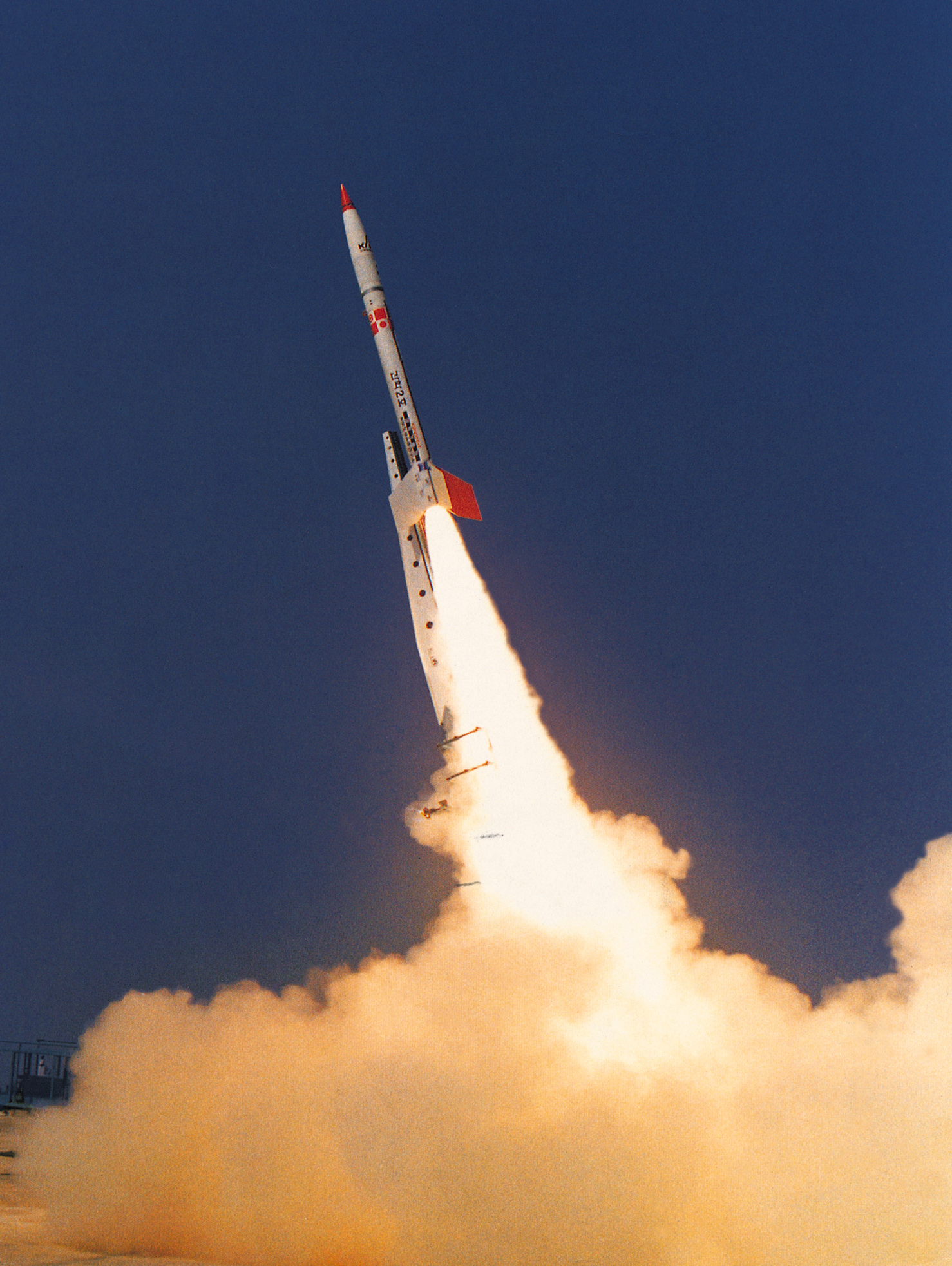
The launch of KSR-I

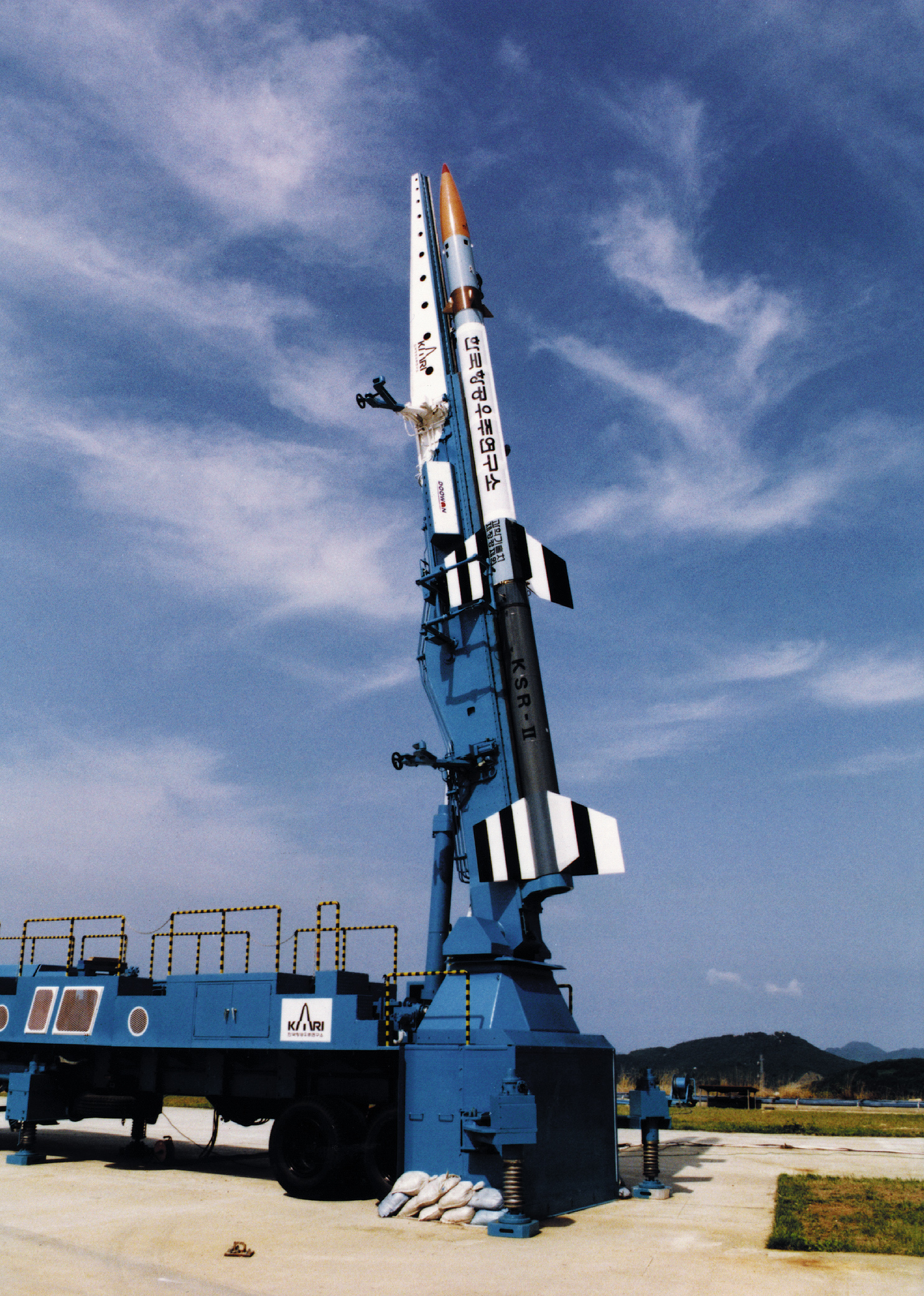
KSR-II at a launchpad

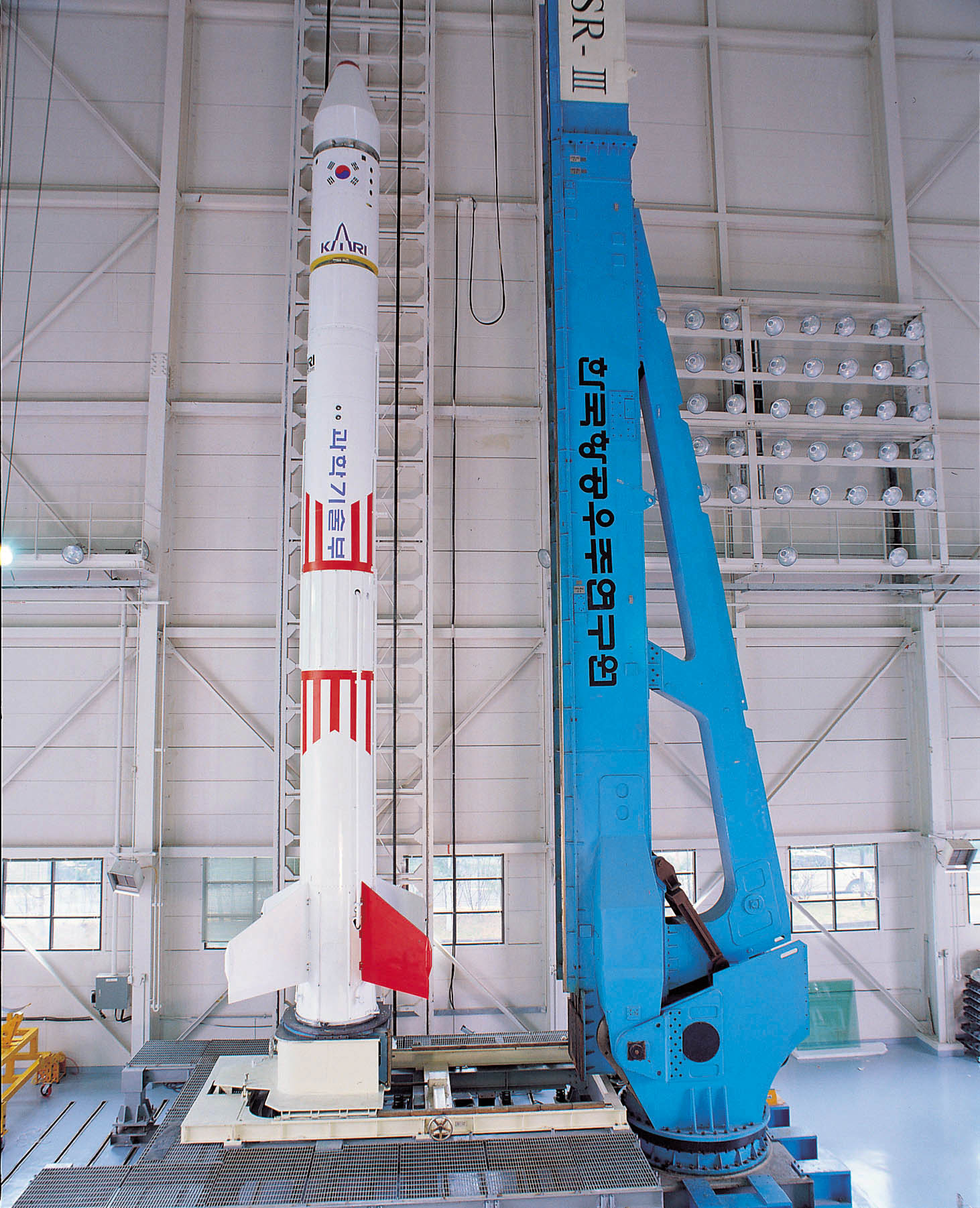
KSR-III

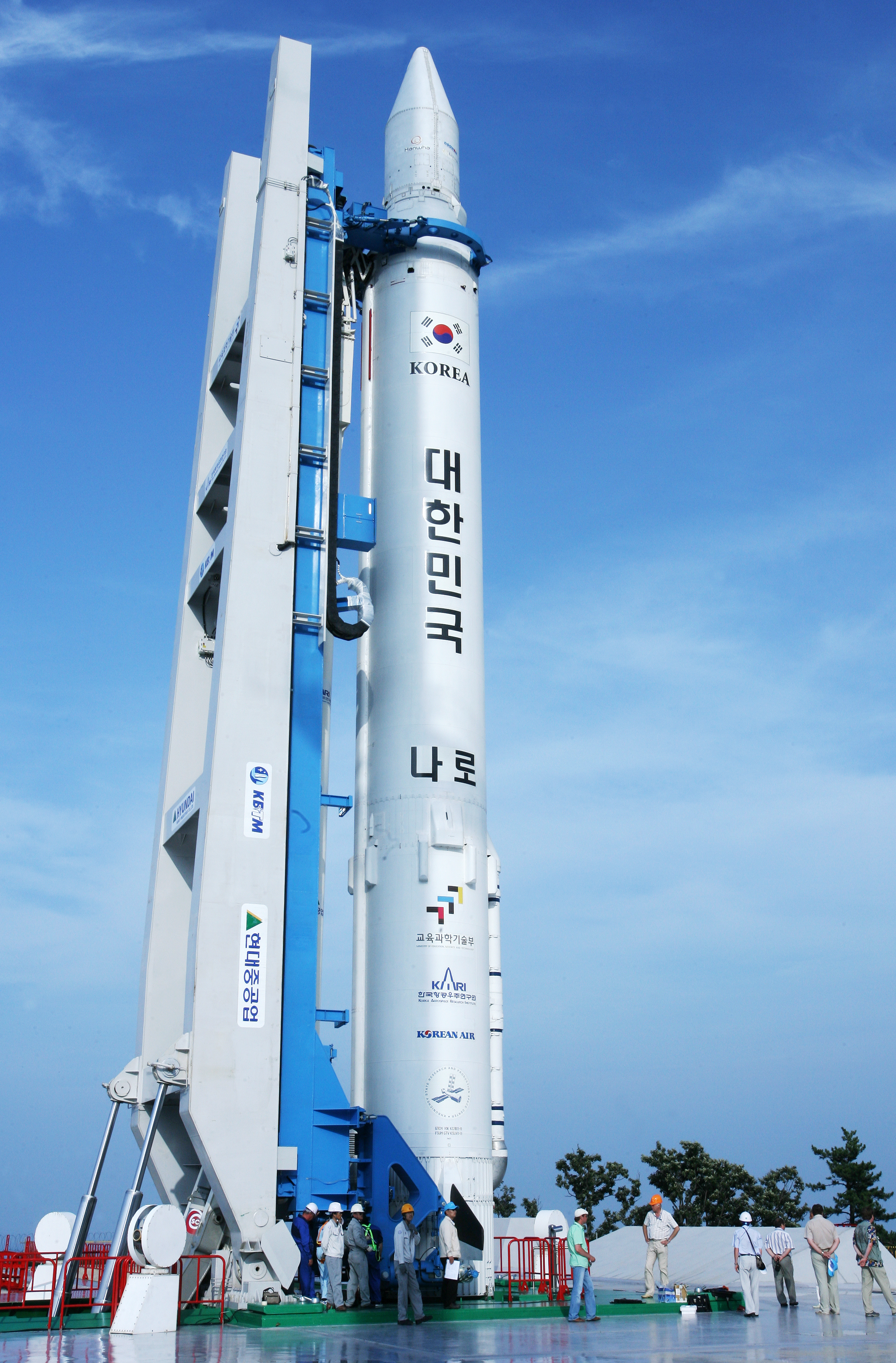
KSLV-1

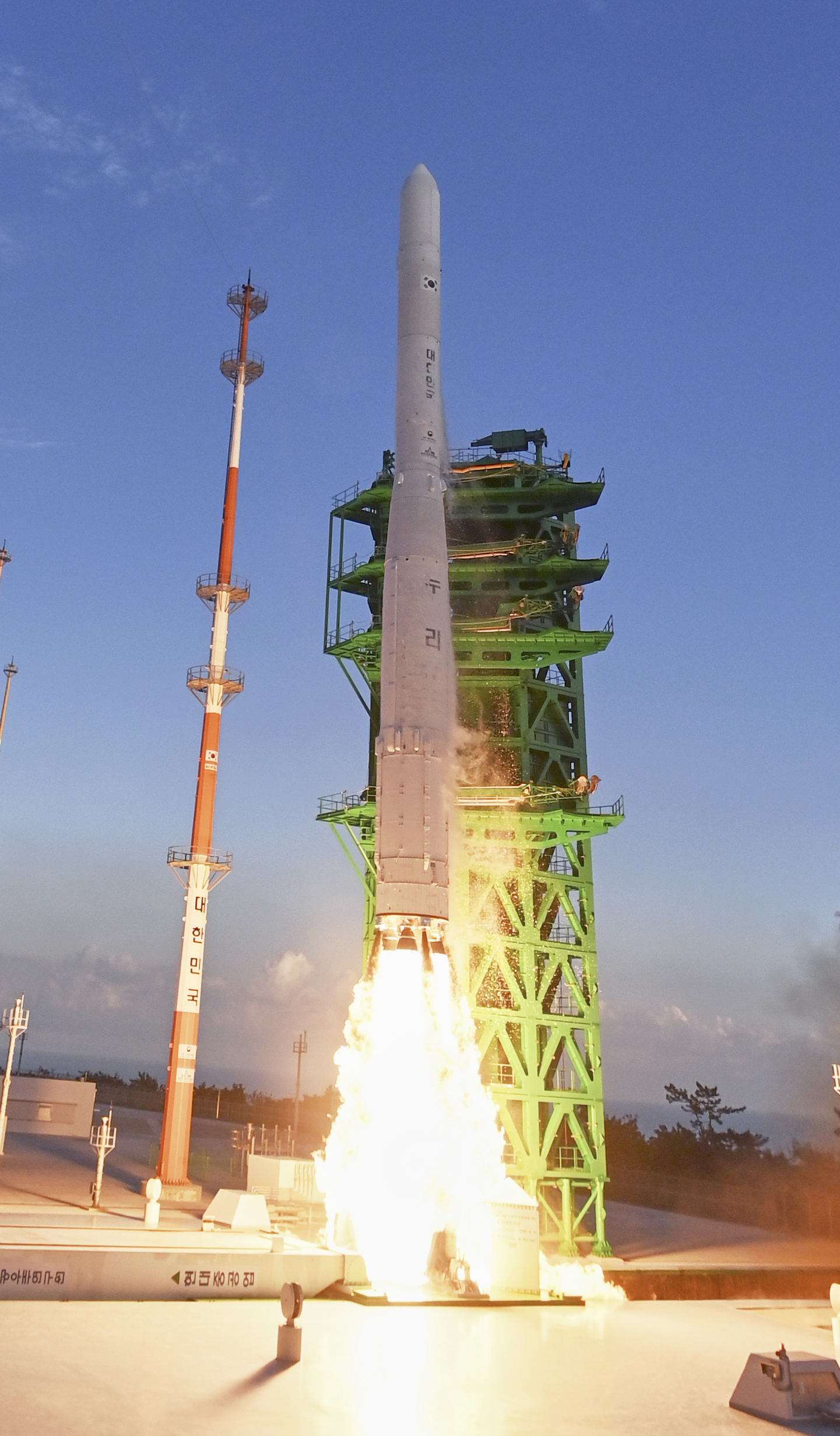
KSLV-2

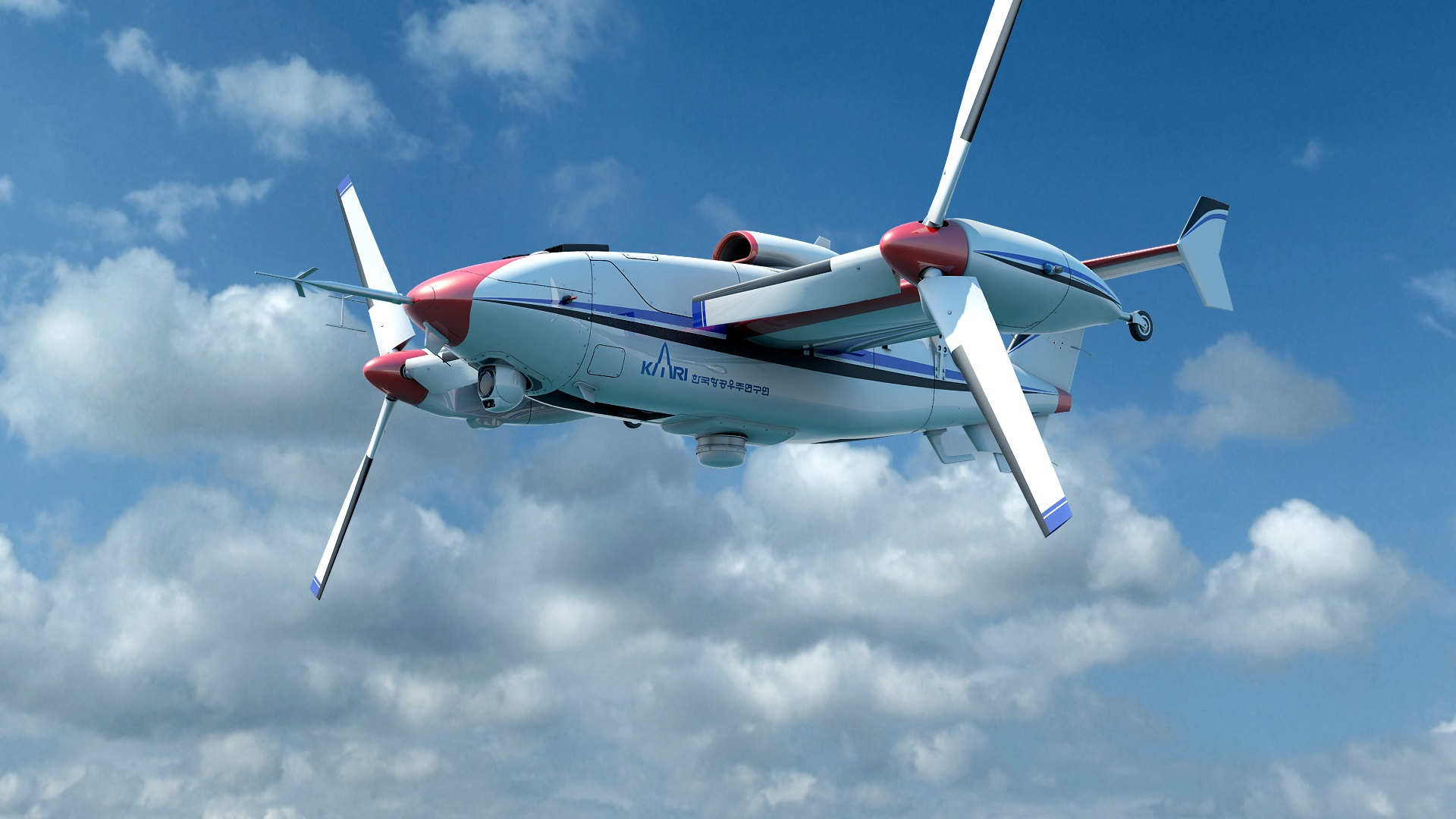
Smart Tilt Rotor UAV

== See also ==
- Naro Space Center
- Korea Astronomy and Space Science Institute (KASI)
- Korea AeroSpace Administration (KASA)
- Agency for Defense Development (ADD)
- South Korean space program
- Korean Lunar Exploration Program
- List of government space agencies
