= Vikram =

Vikram may refer to:

- Vikram (name), an Indian male name meaning "valiant"
- Vikram (rocket family), privately developed by Skyroot Aerospace
  - Vikram-S, a suborbital prototype
  - Vikram-1, the first orbital rocket in the family
  - Vikram-2, a larger orbital rocket, not yet flown
- The lander component of the Chandrayaan programme of lunar exploration missions
  - Chandrayaan-2 § Vikram lander
  - Chandrayaan-3 § Vikram lander
- Vikram, a character based on Vikramaditya in Baital Pachisi
  - Vikram, a character based on the above in the 2017 Indian film Vikram Vedha and its 2022 remake
- Vikram (1986 Tamil film)
- Vikram (1986 Telugu film)
- Vikram (2022 film), an Indian Tamil-language film
- Vikram 32, India’s first indigenous 32-bit space-grade microprocessor
- Vikram (actor) (born 1966), Indian actor
- Vikram Bajaj, character in the 2001 Indian film Ajnabee, played by Akshay Kumar
- Vikram, character in the YRF Spy Universe, played by N. T. Rama Rao Jr.

== See also ==
- Wickrama, a Sinhala male given name
- Bikram (disambiguation)
- Vikramarka (disambiguation)
- Raja Vikramarka (disambiguation)
- Vikram Samvat (Vikram's Era, "V.S." or "B.S."), a calendar in India and the official calendar of Nepal
- Vikramaditya (disambiguation)
  - Vikramaditya, legendary king of India
- Vikram Vedha (disambiguation)
