= List of orbital launch systems =

List of orbital rockets

This is a list of conventional orbital launch systems. This is composed of launch vehicles, and other conventional systems, used to place satellites into orbit.

== Argentina ==
- ORBIT II – Retired
- TRONADOR – Under Development

== Australia ==
- AUSROC IV – Cancelled
- Austral Launch Vehicle – Under Development
- Eris (Gilmour Space Technologies) – Under Development

== Brazil ==
- VLS-1 – Retired
- VLM – Under Development
- MLBR –Under Development

== Canada ==
- Aurora - Under Development

== China ==
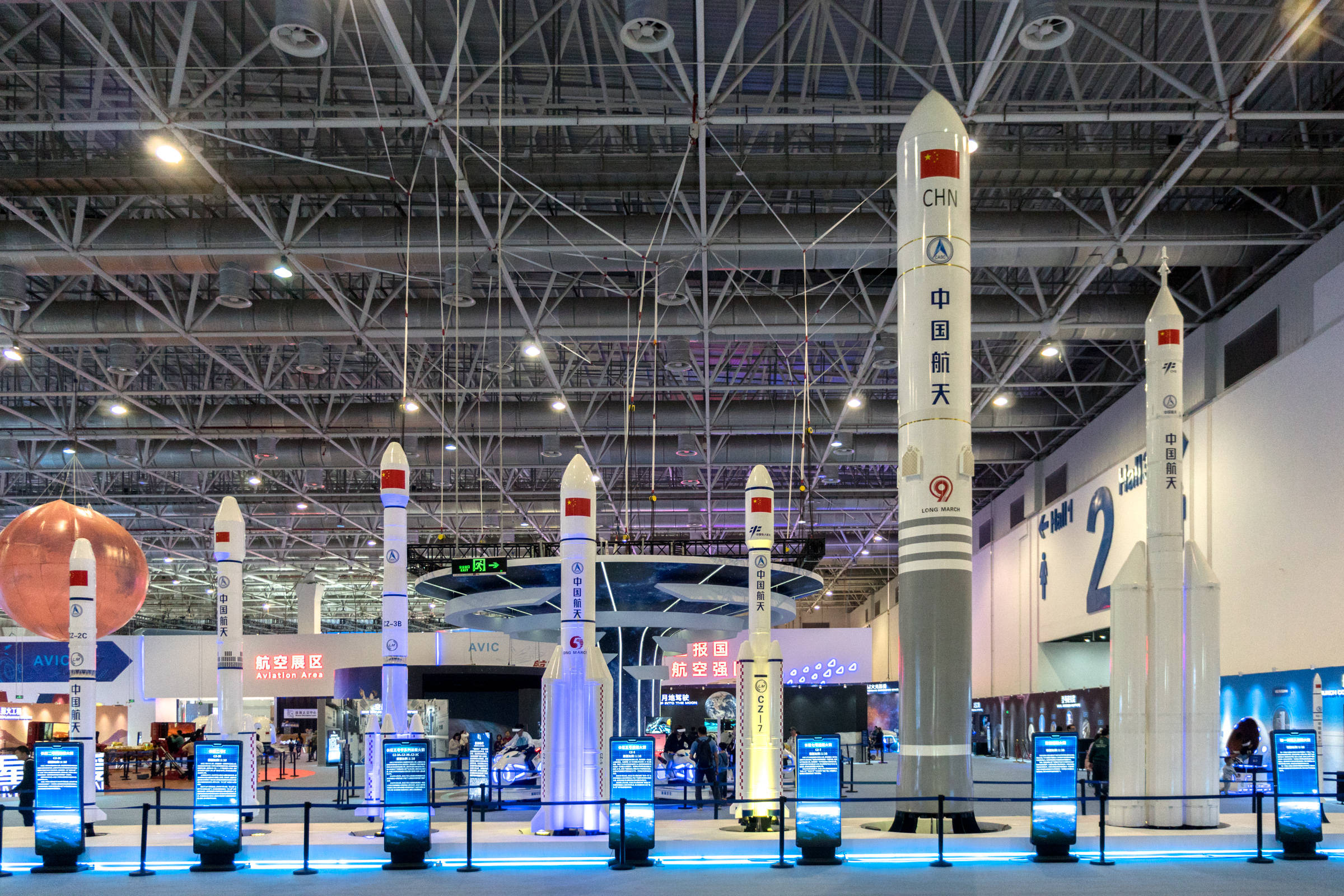
Several rockets of the Long March family

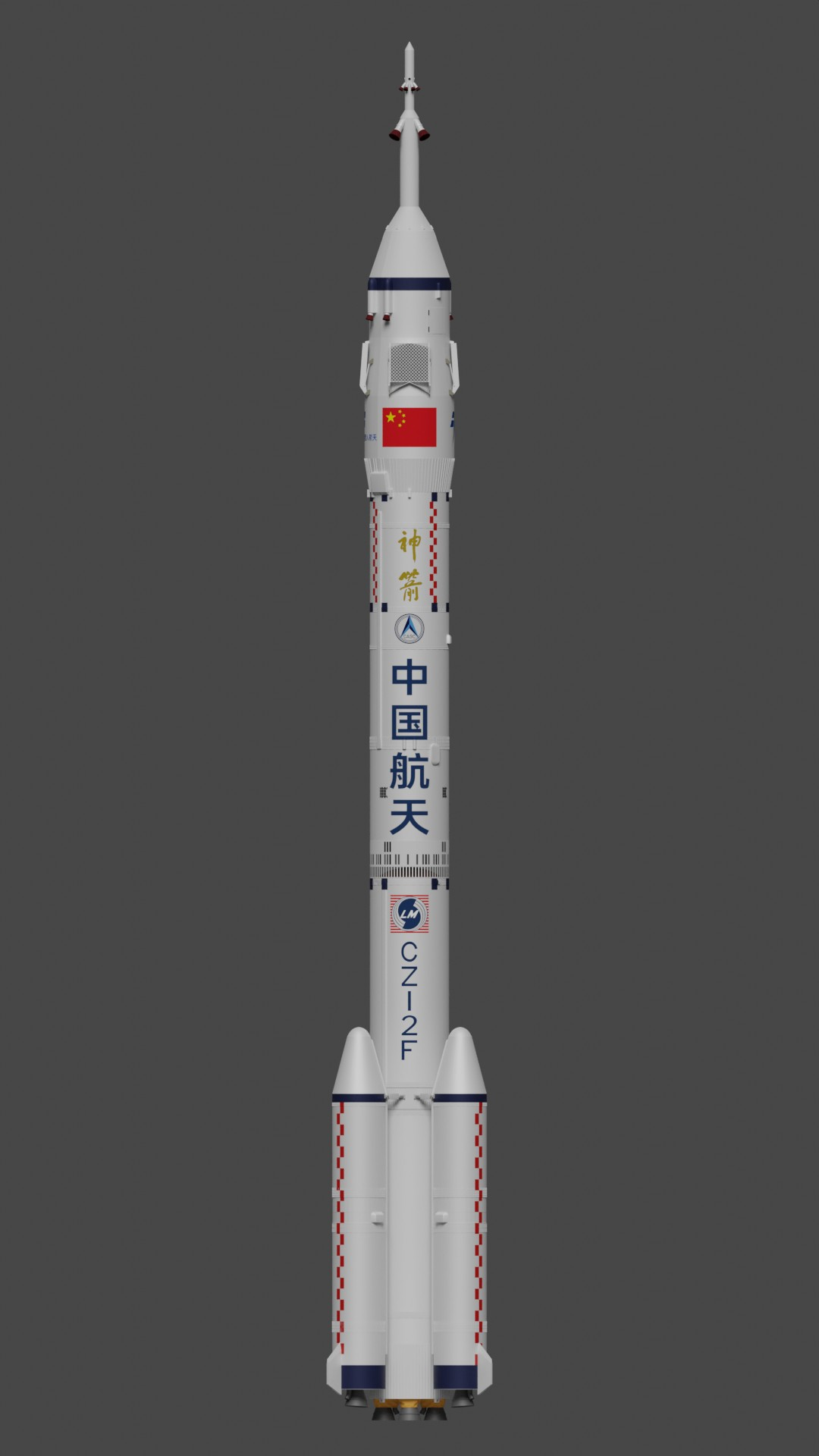
Long March 2F

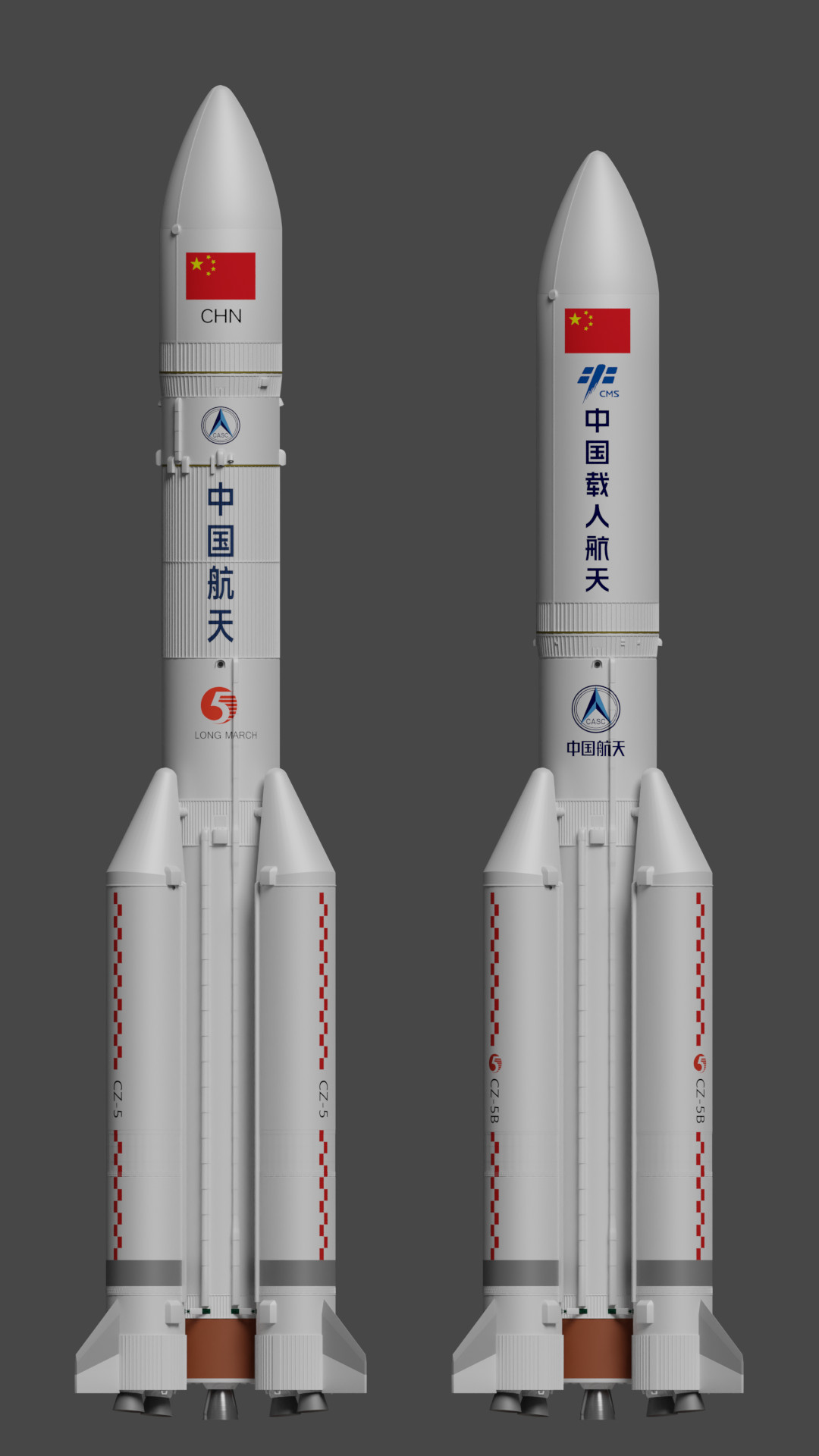
Long March 5

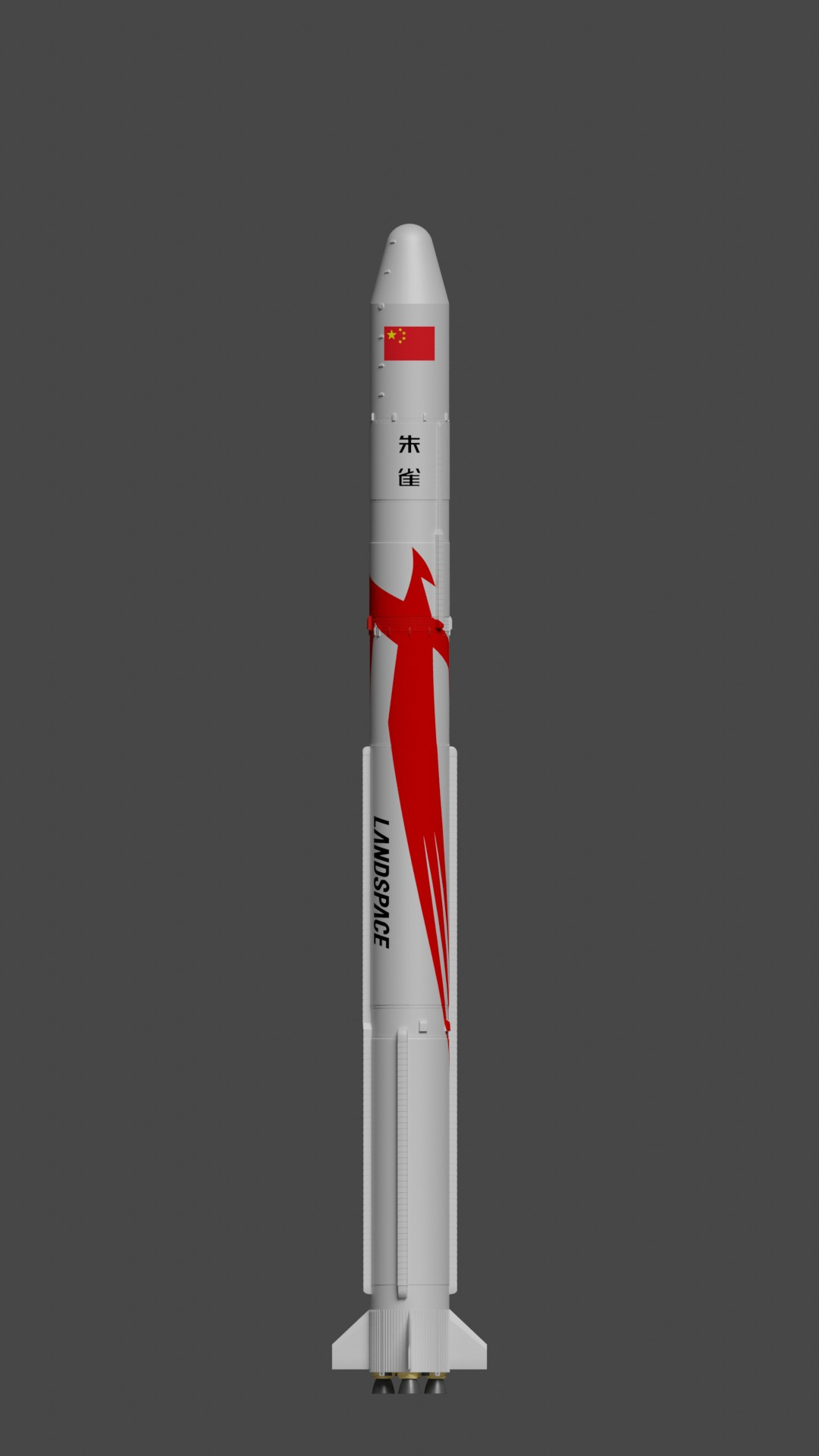
Zhuque-2

=== CASC Launchers ===
- Long March
  - Long March 1 – Retired
    - Long March 1D
  - Long March 2
    - Long March 2A – Retired
    - Long March 2C
    - Long March 2D
    - Long March 2E – Retired
    - Long March 2F
      - Long March 2F/G
      - Long March 2F/T
  - Long March 3 – Retired
    - Long March 3A – Retired
    - Long March 3B – Retired
      - Long March 3B/E
    - Long March 3C – Retired
      - Long March 3C/E
  - Long March 4
    - Long March 4A – Retired
    - Long March 4B
    - Long March 4C
  - Long March 5
    - Long March 5B
  - Long March 6
    - Long March 6A
    - Long March 6C
  - Long March 7
    - Long March 7A
  - Long March 8
    - Long March 8A
  - Long March 9 – Under Development
  - Long March 10– Under Development
    - Long March 10A
  - Long March 11
  - Long March 12

=== Other ===
- Feng Bao 1 – Retired
- Ceres-1
  - Ceres-1S
  - Ceres-2 - Under development
- Gravity
  - Gravity-1
  - Gravity-2 – Under development
- Hyperbola-1
  - Hyperbola-3
- Jielong
  - Jielong 1
  - Jielong 3
- Kaituozhe-1 – Retired
- Kuaizhou
  - Kuaizhou 1 - Retired
  - Kuaizhou 1A - Retired
  - Kuaizhou 1A Pro
  - Kuaizhou 11
- Tianlong-2
  - Tianlong-3
- Zhuque
  - Zhuque-1 – Retired
  - Zhuque-2 - Retired
  - Zhuque-2E
  - Zhuque-3 – Under Development
- Kinetica 1
  - Kinetica 2 - Under development

== European Union ==
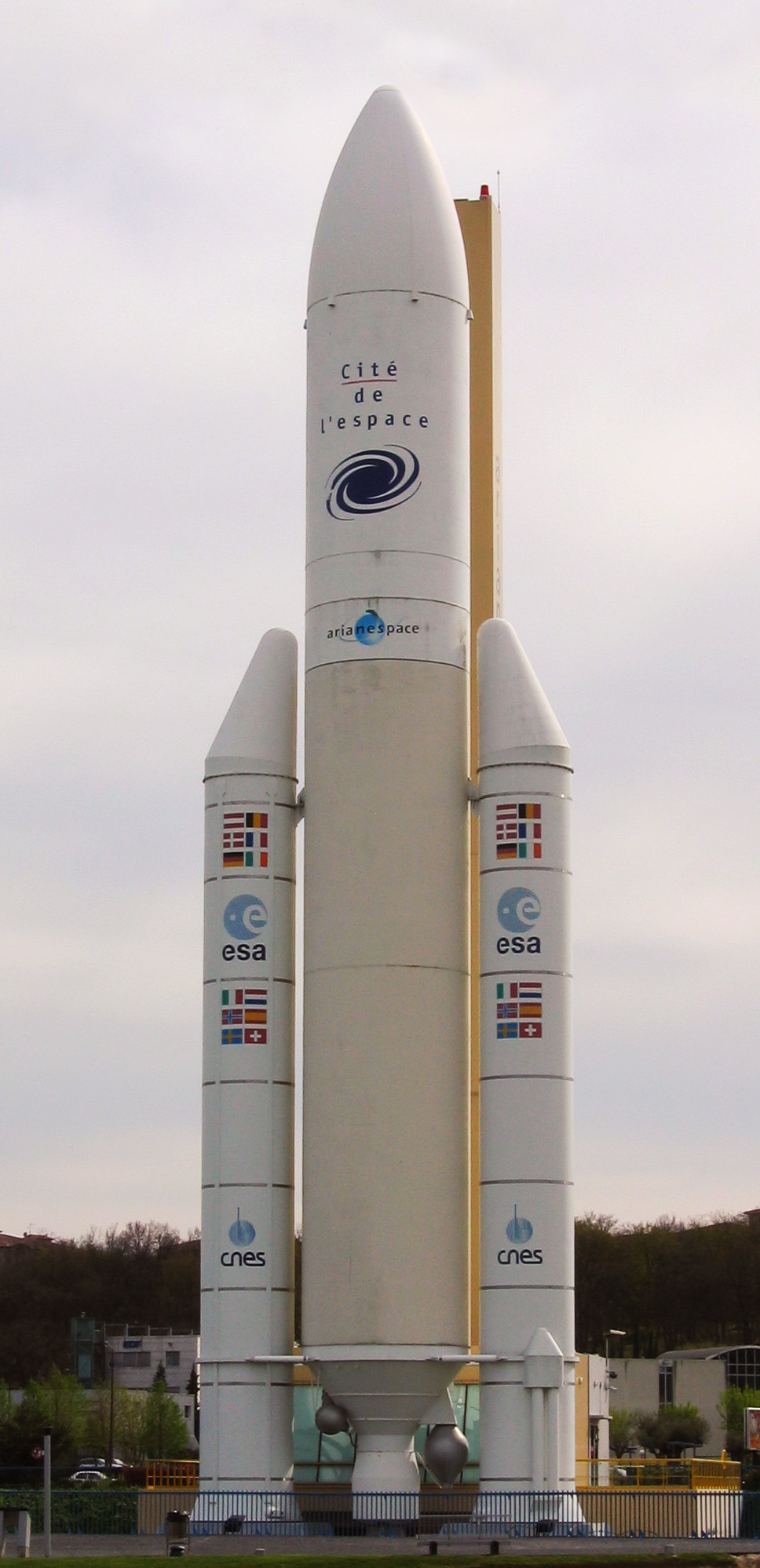
Ariane 5

- Ariane
  - Ariane 1 – Retired
  - Ariane 2 – Retired
  - Ariane 3 – Retired
  - Ariane 4 – Retired
  - Ariane 5 – Retired
  - Ariane 6 – Operational
  - Ariane Next – Under Development
- Europa – Retired
  - Europa I – Retired
  - Europa II – Retired
- Maia – Under Development
- Vega
  - Vega – Retired
  - Vega-C – Operational
  - Vega-E – Under Development

== France ==
- Diamant – Retired
  - Diamant A – Retired 1965-1967
  - Diamant B – Retired 1970-1971
  - Diamant BP4 – Retired 1972-1975
- Zéphyr (Latitude) – Under Development

== Germany ==
- OTRAG – Retired
- Spectrum (Isar Aerospace)
- RFA One (Rocket Factory Augsburg AG) – Under Development
- SL1 (HyImpulse) – Under Development

== India ==
ISRO's launch vehicles. Left to right: SLV, ASLV, PSLV, GSLV, LVM3

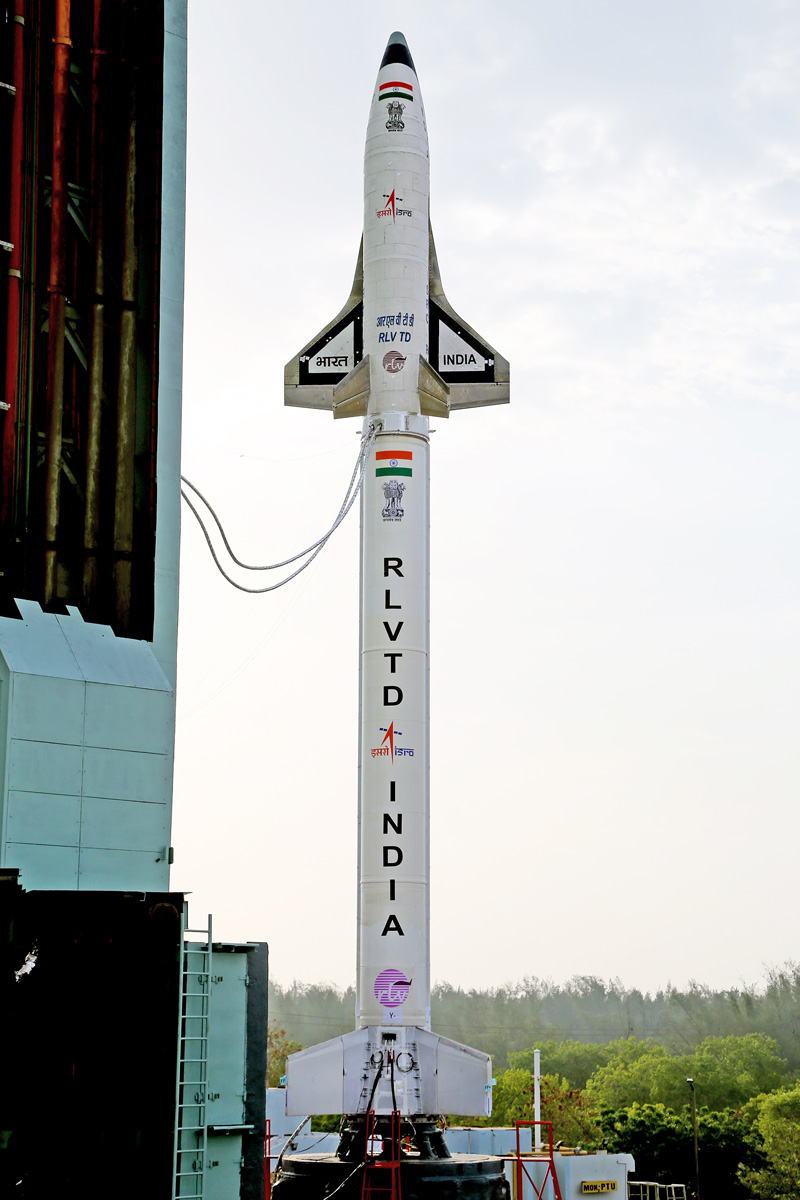
RLV

Human Rated Launch Vehicle (HRLV)

=== ISRO/DoS systems ===
- SLV-3 – Retired
- Augmented Satellite Launch Vehicle (ASLV) – Retired
- Polar Satellite Launch Vehicle (PSLV)
  - PSLV-G – Retired
  - PSLV-CA – Operational
  - PSLV-XL – Operational
  - PSLV-DL – Operational
  - PSLV-QL – Operational
- Geosynchronous Satellite Launch Vehicle (GSLV)
  - GSLV Mark I – Retired
  - GSLV Mark II – Operational
  - RLV TD: GSLV derived ascent vehicle for RLV ORE campaign.
- Launch Vehicle Mark-3 (LVM-3)
  - LVM3 – Operational
  - Human-rated LVM3 – Under development
  - LVM3 with semi-cryogenic engine – Under development
- Small Satellite Launch Vehicle (SSLV) – Operational
- Next Generation Launch Vehicle (NGLV) – Under development

=== Private agencies ===
- Vikram (Skyroot Aerospace):
  - Vikram-I – Operational
  - Vikram-II – Under development

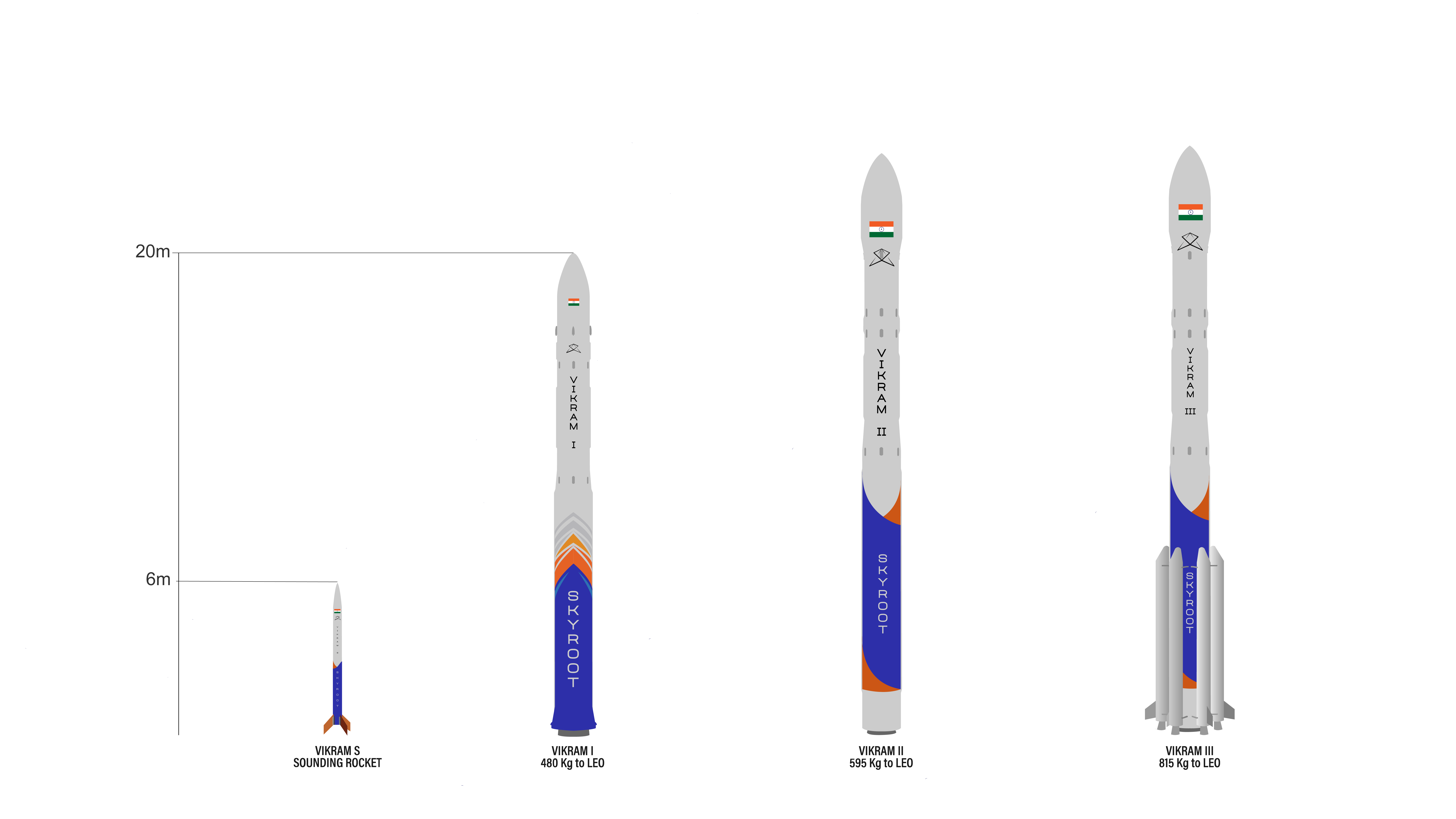
The Vikram series of Skyroot Aerospace

- Agnibaan (AgniKul Cosmos): – Under development

Agnibaan

- Razor Crest Mk I (EtherealX) – Under development
- Mach Blue (Cosmicport) – Under development

== Iran ==
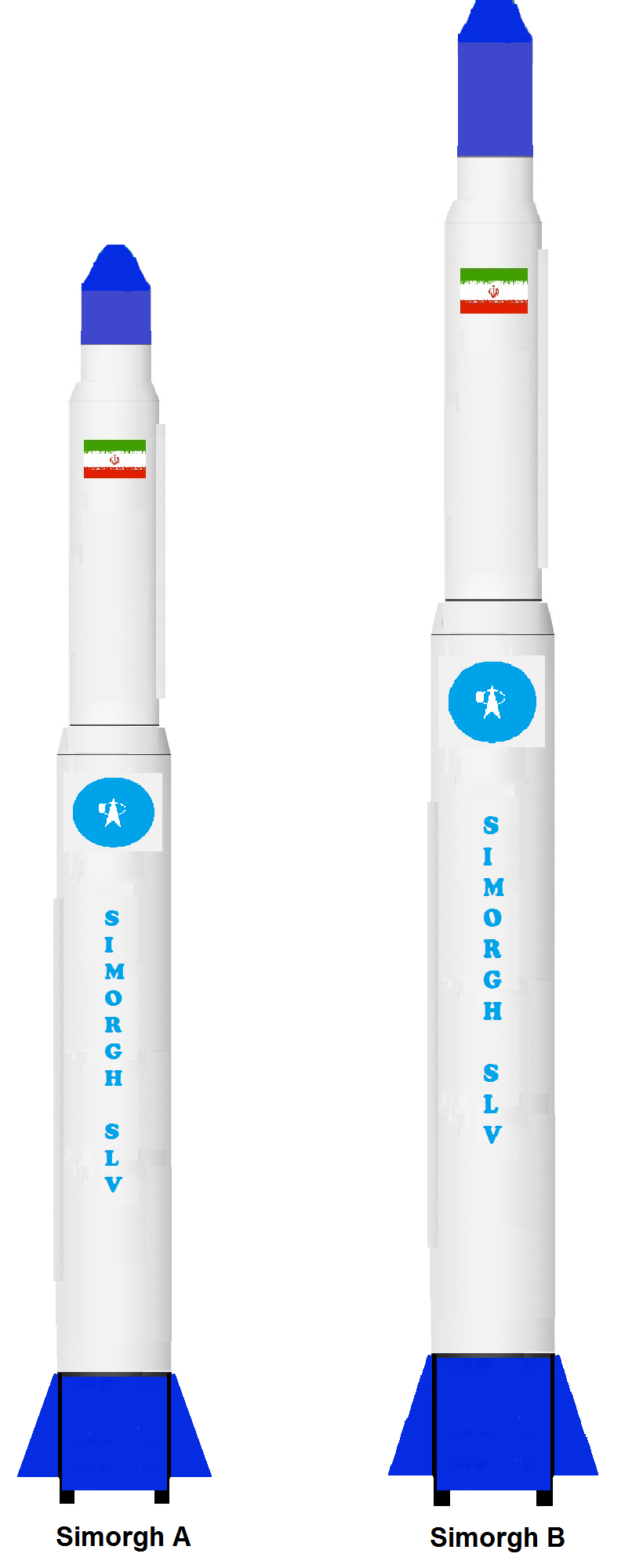
Simorgh SLV

- Safir – Retired
- Simorgh – Operational
- Qased – Operational
- Qaem 100 – Operational
- Qaem 105 – Under Development
- Zuljanah – Operational

== Israel ==
- Shavit 2

== Italy ==
- SISPRE C-41 – Retired
- Italian LTV SCOUT (jointly with United States of America) – Retired
- AERITALIA/SNIA/BPD ALFA – Retired
- ALENIA/SNIA-BPD SAN MARCO SCOUT (jointly with NASA) – Cancelled
- Vega (jointly with European Space Agency)
  - Vega – Retired
  - Vega-C – Operational
- T4i Odyssey – Under Development

== Japan ==
Mu rockets

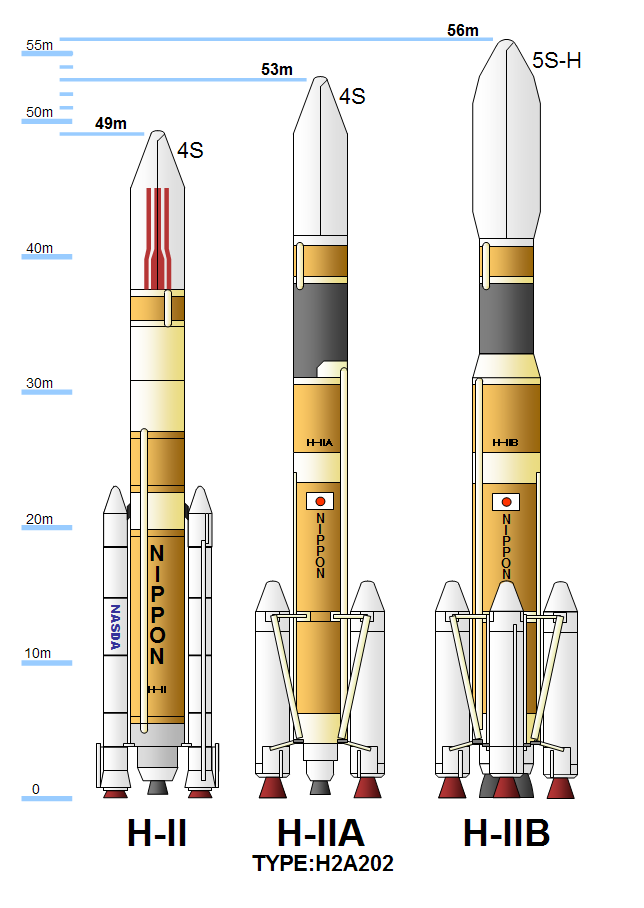
H-II series

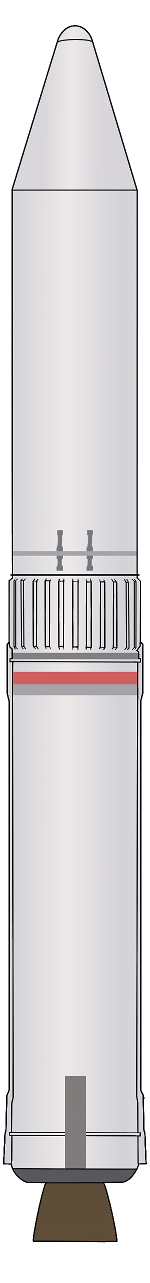
Εpsilon

=== Active ===
- H3 (JAXA)
- KAIROS (Space One)

=== Inactive ===
- Lambda (ISAS) – Retired
  - L-4S
- Mu (ISAS) – Retired
  - M-4S
  - M-3C
  - M-3H
  - M-3S
  - M-3SII
  - M-V
- N (NASDA) – Retired
  - N-I
  - N-II
- H-I (NASDA) – Retired
- H-II — Retired
  - H-II (NASDA)
  - H-IIA (JAXA)
  - H-IIB (JAXA)
- J-I (NASDA/ISAS) – Retired
- GX (Galaxy Express) – Cancelled
- Epsilon (JAXA) – Retired
  - Epsilon S (JAXA) – Under Development
- SS-520 (JAXA) – Retired
- ZERO (Interstellar Technologies) – Under Development
- DECA (Interstellar Technologies) – Under Development

== Malaysia ==
- DNLV (Independence-X Aerospace) – Under Development

== New Zealand ==
- Electron (Rocket Lab, developed in New Zealand and the United States)
- Neutron – Under Development

== North Korea ==
- Chollima-1
- Paektusan-1 – Retired
- Unha
  - Unha-2 – Retired
  - Unha-3

== Romania ==
- Haas – Under Development

== Singapore ==
- Volans (Equatorial Space Systems) – Under Development

== Soviet Union and successor states (Russia and Ukraine) ==
Russia/USSR

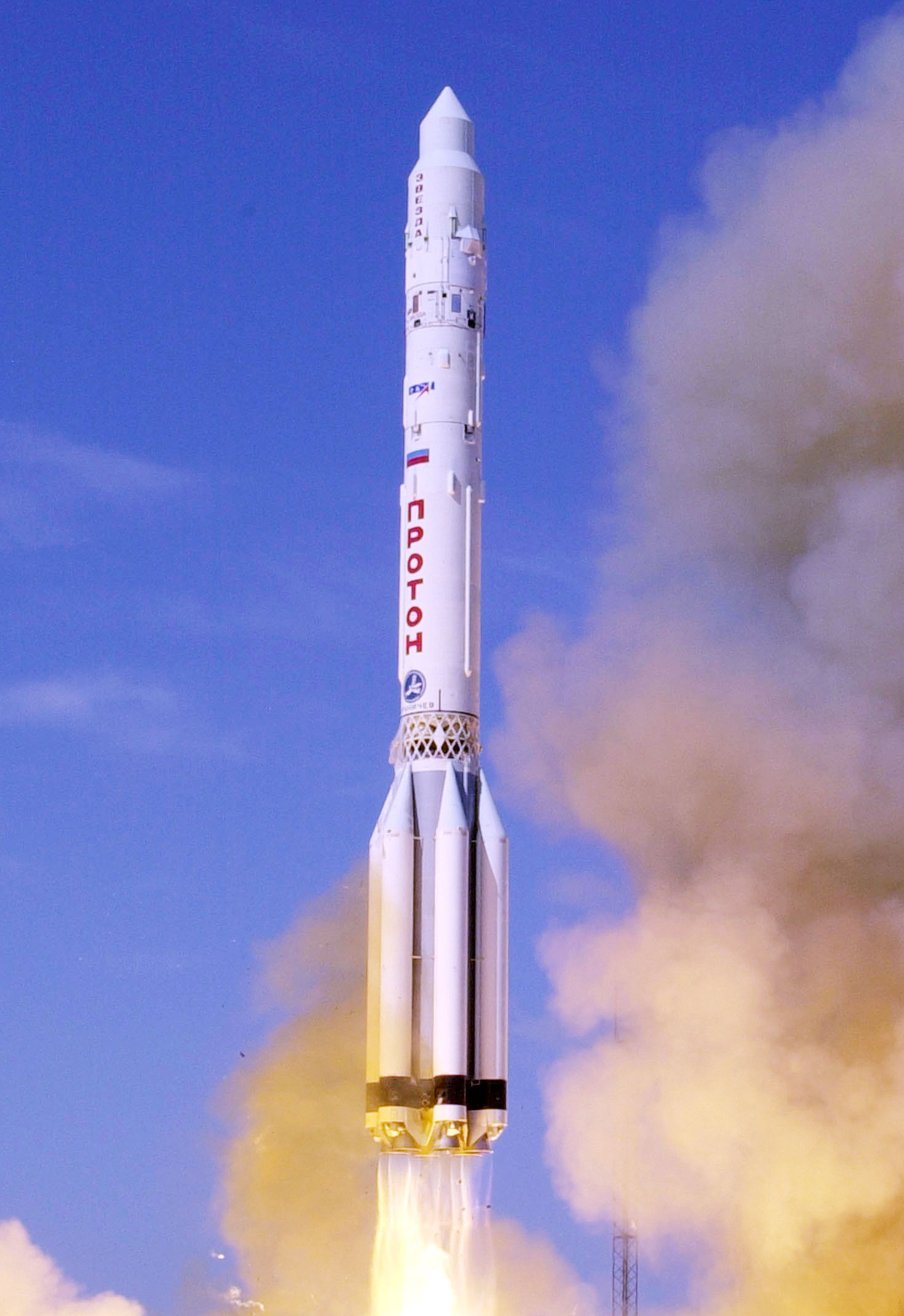
Proton-K

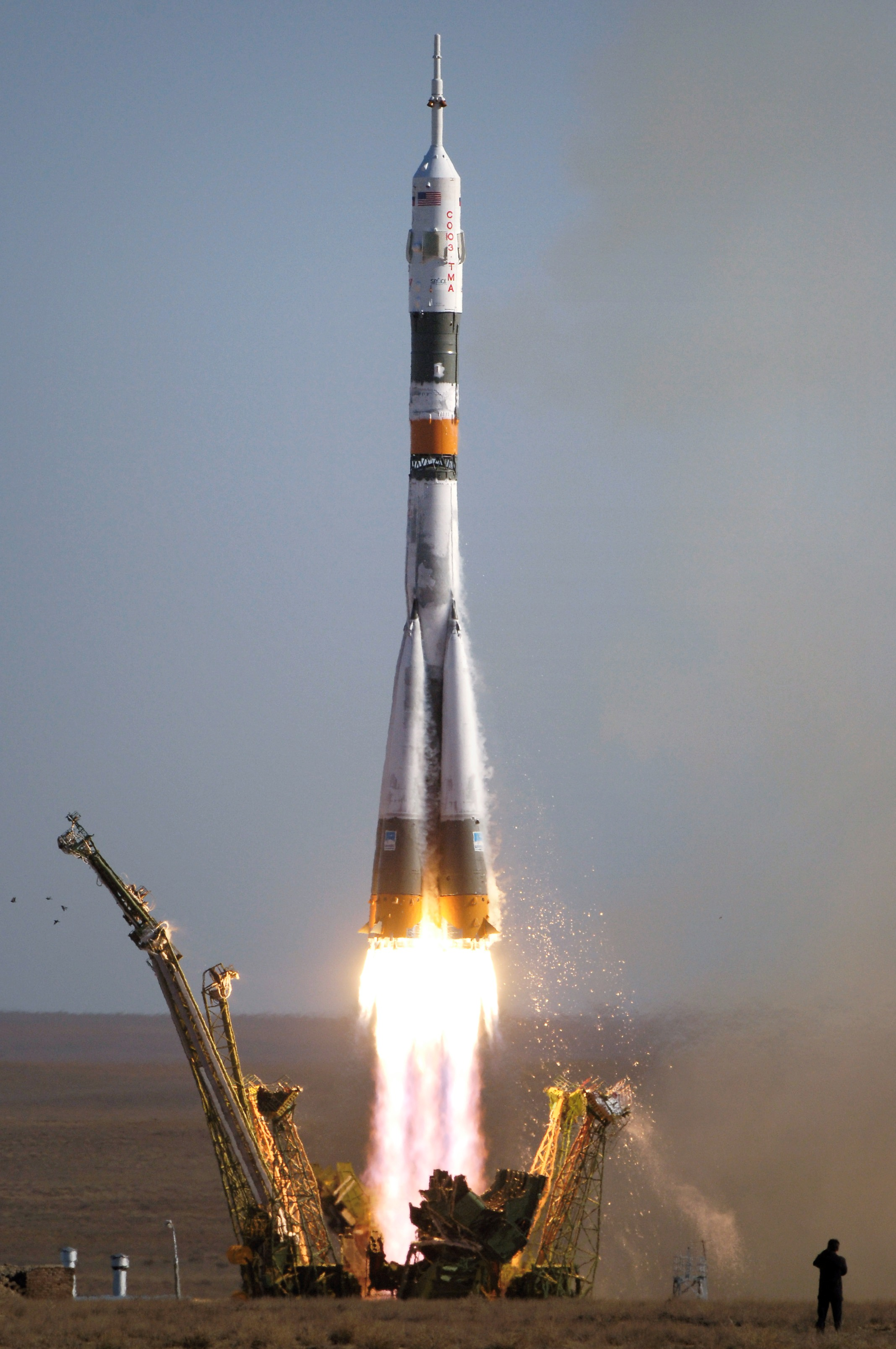
Soyuz-FG

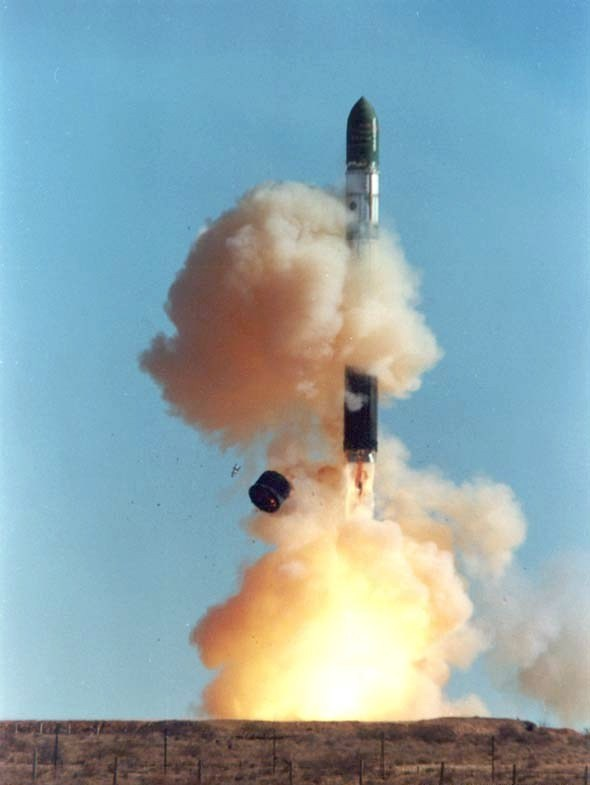
Dnepr-1

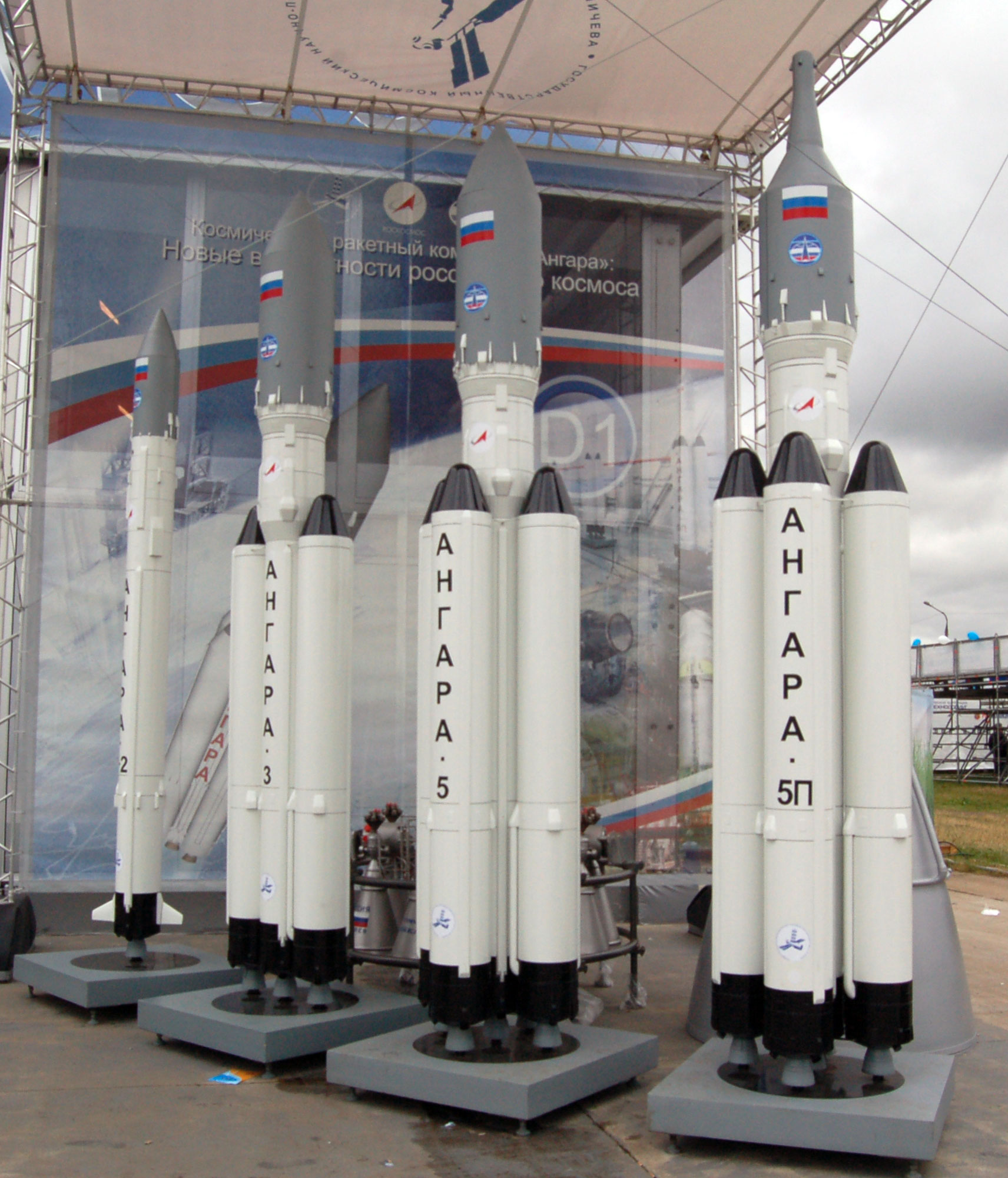
Angara Family

- Angara
- CORONA (SSTO) – Open
- Kosmos – Retired
  - Kosmos-1
  - Kosmos-2I
  - Kosmos-3
  - Kosmos-3M
- Lin Industrial projects
  - Adler – Under Development
  - Aldan – Under Development
  - Aniva – Under Development
  - Taymyr – Under Development
  - Vyuga – Under Development
- N1 – Retired
- R-7
  - Luna – Retired
  - Molniya – Retired
    - Molniya-M
    - Molniya-L
  - Polyot – Retired
  - Soyuz family
    - Soyuz – Retired
      - Soyuz-L
      - Soyuz-M
      - Soyuz-U
        - Soyuz-U2
        - Soyuz-FG
    - Soyuz-2
      - Soyuz 2.1A
      - Soyuz 2.1B
      - Soyuz 2.1V – Retired
  - Sputnik – Retired
  - Stalker (rocket)
  - Voskhod – Retired
  - Vostok – Retired
    - Vostok-L
    - Vostok-K
    - Vostok-2
    - Vostok-2M
    - Soyuz/Vostok
- R-29
  - Shtil'
  - Volna
- Rus-M – Canceled
- Start-1
- Soyuz-5 family - Under Development
  - Irtysh - Under Development
  - Yenisey - Under Development
  - Don - Under Development
- Soyuz-7 family - Under Development
  - Amur - Under Development
- Universal Rocket
  - UR-100
    - Rokot
    - Strela
  - Proton (UR-500) – Retired
    - Proton-K
    - Proton-M
- Energia – Retired

Ukraine

- Zenit
  - Zenit 2 – Retired
  - Zenit-2M – Retired
  - Zenit-3SL
  - Zenit 3SLB
  - Zenit-3F
- R-36
  - Dnepr
  - Tsyklon
    - Tsyklon-2 – Retired
    - Tsyklon-3 – Retired
    - Tsyklon-4 – Abandoned
      - Cyclone-4M – Under Development

== South Africa ==
- RSA – Cancelled
  - RSA-1
  - RSA-2
  - RSA-3
- CHEETAH-1 – Under Development

== South Korea ==
- Blue Whale 1 (Perigee Aerospace) – Under Development
- HANBIT family (Innospace)
  - HANBIT-Micro – Under Development
  - HANBIT-Mini – Under Development
  - HANBIT-NANO
  - HANBIT-TLV
- Korea Space Launch Vehicle family (KSLV)
  - KSLV-I (Naro) – Retired
  - KSLV-II (Nuri)
  - KSLV-III – Under Development
- Solid-fuel space launch vehicle family
  - Solid-fueled GYŪB‑TV1 (Test Vehicle 1)
  - Solid-fueled GYŪB‑TV2 (Test Vehicle 2)
  - Solid-fueled LV – Under Development

== Spain ==
- INTA Family
  - INTA Capricornio – Cancelled
  - INTA Programa PILUM – Under Development
- PLD Space Family
  - PLD Space Miura Next – Under development
  - PLD Space Miura 5 – Under development
  - PLD Space Miura 1 – Operational
- Pangea Aerospace Family
  - Pangea Aerospace Meso – Under development
- Zero 2 Infinity Family
  - Zero 2 Infinity Bloostar – Under development
- Celestia Aerospace Family
  - Celestia Aerospace Sagittarius – Under development

== Taiwan ==
- TSLV – Under Development
- Hapith V – Under Development
- HTTP-3a – Under Development

== United Kingdom ==
- Black Arrow – Retired
- Black Prince – Cancelled
- Prime (Orbex) – Under Development
- Skyrora XL (Skyrora) – Under Development
- Skylon (Reaction Engines) – Cancelled

== United States ==
=== Active ===
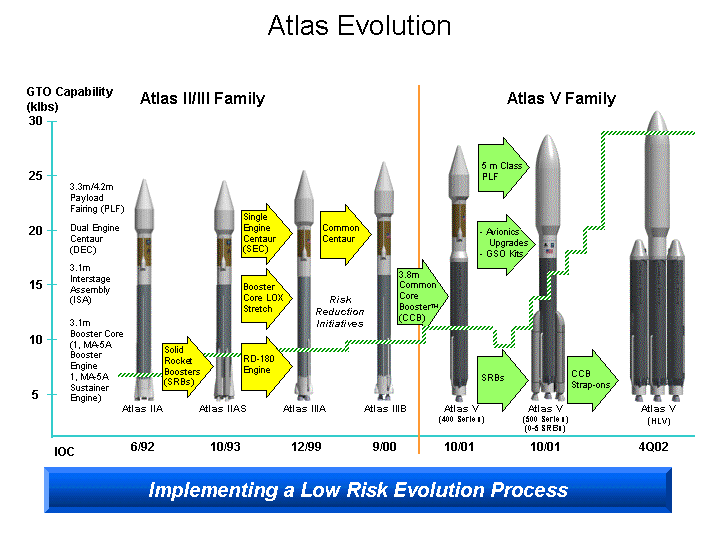
Atlas rockets

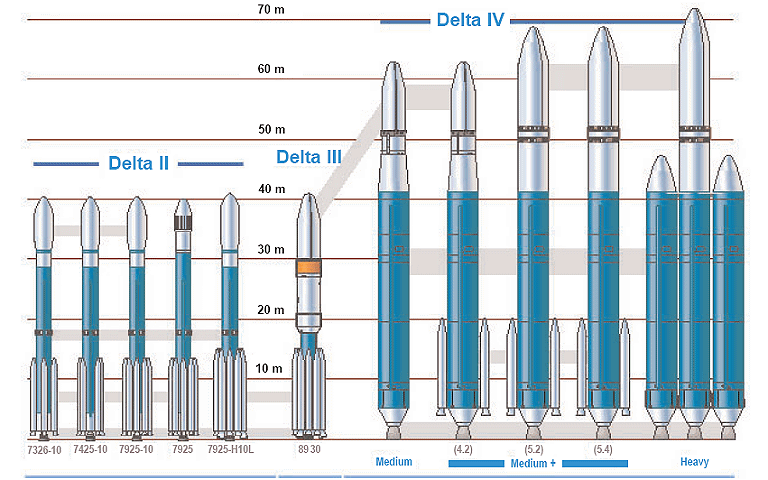
Delta rockets

Falcon rockets and Starship

- Alpha (Firefly Aerospace)
- Antares (Northrop Grumman Innovation Systems)
- Atlas V (United Launch Alliance)(Nearing Retirement)
- Electron (Rocket Lab) (New Zealand/United States company)
- Minotaur (Northrop Grumman Innovation Systems)
  - Minotaur I
  - Minotaur IV
  - Minotaur V
  - Minotaur-C
- Pegasus (Northrop Grumman Innovation Systems)
- Space Launch System (NASA)
- SpaceX launch vehicles
  - Falcon 9 Block 5 – Operational
  - Falcon Heavy – Operational
  - Starship – Operational
- New Glenn (Blue Origin)
- Vulcan Centaur (United Launch Alliance)

=== Inactive ===
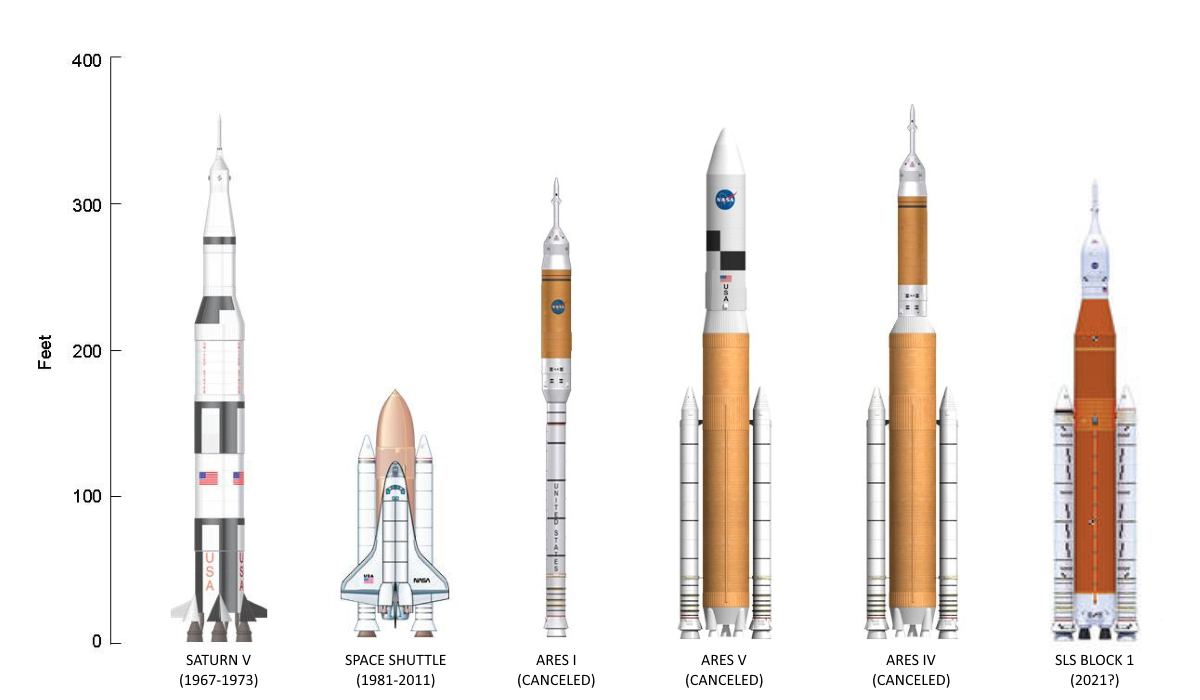
Comparison of Saturn V, Space Shuttle, three Ares rockets, and SLS Block 1

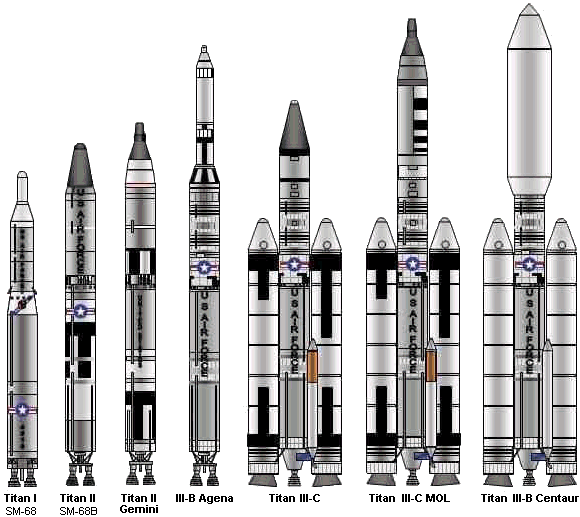
Titan rockets

- Ares – Canceled
  - Ares I
  - Ares IV
  - Ares V
- Astra Space launch vehicles
  - Rocket 3 – Retired
  - Rocket 4 – Under development
- Athena – Retired
  - Athena I
  - Athena II
- Atlas
  - Atlas B – Retired
  - Atlas D – Retired
  - Atlas-Able – Retired
  - Atlas-Agena – Retired
  - Atlas E/F – Retired
  - Atlas H – Retired
  - Atlas LV-3B – Retired
  - Atlas SLV-3 – Retired
  - Atlas-Centaur – Retired
    - Atlas G – Retired
    - Atlas I – Retired
    - Atlas II – Retired
    - Atlas III – Retired
- Conestoga – Retired
- LauncherOne
- Minotaur
  - Minotaur I
  - Minotaur IV
  - Minotaur V
  - Minotaur-C
- Nova (Stoke Space) – Under development
- OmegA – Canceled
- Orbital Accelerator (SpinLaunch) – Under Development
- Phantom Express – Canceled
- Pilot – Retired
- Redstone – Retired
  - Juno I
  - Sparta
- Jupiter
  - Juno II
- Relativity Space launch vehicles
  - Terran 1 – Retired
  - Terran R – Under Development
- RS1 (ABL Space Systems) – Retired
- Saturn
  - Saturn I – Retired 1961-1963
    - Saturn IB – Retired 1966-1975
  - Saturn V – Retired 1967-1973
- Scout – Retired
  - Scout X-1
  - Scout X-2
  - Scout X-2B
  - Scout X-2M
  - Scout X-3
  - Scout X-3M
  - Scout X-4
  - Scout A
  - Scout A-1
  - Scout B
  - Scout B-1
  - Scout D-1
  - Scout E-1
  - Scout F-1
  - Scout G-1
- Space Shuttle – Retired
- SpaceX launch vehicles
  - Falcon 1 – Retired
  - Falcon 1e – Canceled
  - Falcon 5 – Canceled
  - Falcon 9
    - Falcon 9 Air – Canceled
    - Falcon 9 v1.0 – Retired
    - Falcon 9 v1.1 – Retired
    - Falcon 9 Full Thrust – Retired
- Thor – Retired
  - Thor-Able
  - Thor-Ablestar
  - Thor-Agena
    - Thorad-Agena
  - Thor-Burner
  - Thor DSV-2U
  - Delta
    - Thor-Delta
    - Delta A
    - Delta B
    - Delta C
    - Delta D
    - Delta E
    - Delta G
    - Delta J
    - Delta L
    - Delta M
    - Delta N
    - Delta II
    - Delta III
    - Delta IV
    - Delta IV Heavy
- Titan – Retired
  - Titan II GLV
  - Titan 23G
  - Titan IIIA
  - Titan IIIB
  - Titan IIIC
  - Titan IIID
  - Titan IIIE
  - Titan 34D
  - Commercial Titan III
  - Titan IV
- Vanguard – Retired
- Vector-R – Under Development
- Vector-H – Under Development

== See also ==
- Comparison of orbital launch systems
- Comparison of orbital launcher families
- Lists of orbital launch vehicles by payload capacity:
  - Small-lift launch vehicle (up to 2,000 kg to Low Earth Orbit (LEO))
  - Medium-lift launch vehicle (from 2,000 to 20,000 kg to LEO)
  - Heavy-lift launch vehicle (from 20,000 to 50,000 kg to LEO)
  - Super heavy-lift launch vehicle (beyond 50,000 kg to LEO)
