= Brazilian Small-lift launch vehicle program =

Brazilian microsatellite launcher program

- Subvenção Econômica à Inovação do Veículo lançador de pequeno porte para lançamento de nano e/ou microssatélites

Program overview
- Country: Brazil
- Organization: Brazilian Space Agency; Finep
- Purpose: Orbital launch vehicles
- Status: active

Program history
- Cost: R$374 million (US$66.87 million)
- Duration: 2023-2027
- Launch site: Alcântara Space Center

Small-Lift Launch Vehicle (Veículo Lançador de Pequeno Porte, VLPP), is an Economic Subsidy for Innovation program, budgeted at 374 million BRL (72,400,000 USD) created by the Financier of Studies and Projects, FINEP, in partnership with the Brazilian Space Agency, with the aim of developing orbital satellite launch vehicles of the SLLV class, Small-Lift Launch Vehicle, or Light Launch Vehicle, also called Microlancers.

== Context ==
The public bid was created with the aim of providing resources for the creation of Brazilian orbital launch vehicles, along the lines of NASA's Commercial Crew Program and Commercial Resupply Services. Thus, the Brazilian Government is solely responsible for funding, with the private sector taking responsibility for research and development. This is different from the VLM, where the Aeronautics and Space Institute is responsible for research, development and use, with the private sector supplying the raw materials.

The delays in developing the VLM, with the company responsible, Avibrás, suffering from a financial crisis, was one of the main reasons for creating the call for bids.

In short, the Call for Innovation Grants for small launch vehicles to launch nano and/or microsatellites was created to meet the need for a domestic launch vehicle, in addition to the New Space market outsourcing the role of research and development to the private sector, such as startups.

== Requisites ==
The main requirements of the bidding process were:

- Development of a vehicle capable of launching at least 5 kg of payload into an equatorial circular orbit of 450 km.
- Development of operational means for launching the vehicle.
- Existing operational resources may be used, provided they are duly authorized by the entities that own these resources.
- Developing the vehicle and carrying out the launch operation in compliance with all the safety requirements of the launch site.
- Designing, qualifying and building at least two flight prototypes on Brazilian territory.
- Carrying out launch operations from national territory.

In addition to these, there were differential requirements, but they were not compulsory:

- Simultaneous launch of multiple nano-satellites.
- Ability to perform early re-entry of its last stage into the atmosphere (avoid space debris).
- Support for the full spectrum of inclinations, from insertion into low-inclination (equatorial) orbits to polar and heliosynchronous orbits.
- Potential for evolution/growth of its capabilities in payload mass and orbital insertion accuracy.
- Use of systems and equipment developed or under development in parallel programs within the Brazilian Space Program.
- Improved orbital insertion accuracy.
- Best cost per kilo of payload inserted into orbit.
- Greater efficiency for the launch operation in terms of cost, number of human resources involved in the on-site activity and preparation and launch time.

== Result ==
=== Early result ===
Initially, Avibrás was chosen as the sole winner of the bid. However, the financial crisis caused it to be disqualified.

==== Final result ====
As a result, it was decided that two companies would be chosen: Akaer and CENIC.

Group I

- Lead by:
  - AKAER ENGENHARIA S.A.
- Co-members:
  - ACRUX LTDA.
  - BRENG ENGENHARIA E TECNOLOGIA LTDA.
  - ESSADO DE MORAIS LTDA.

Group II

- Lead by:
  - CENIC ENGENHARIA INDÚSTRIA E COMÉRCIO LTDA
- Co-members:
  - CONCERT TECHNOLOGIES S.A.
  - SCHELIM ENGENHARIA EIRELLI.
  - PLASMAHUB AMBIENTAL IND. ENG. EXP. E IMP. LTDA.
  - ETSYS INDÚSTRIA E TECNOLOGIA EM SISTEMAS LTDA.

== Rockets ==
=== VLN-AKR ===
Based on the Montenegro project, which was being developed by its partner ACRUX, AKAER began developing the Akaer Nanosatellite Launch Vehicle, or VLN-AKR.

The vehicle would have three stages, it would reuse the S-30 engines developed for the VS-30 and VSB-30 in the first and second stages, and would use an S-18 engine in the third stage, some sources say an engine based on a Sonda-2 rocket engine.

Its launch was expected to take place in the first half of 2027. However, the project was suspended due to a failure to file financial accounts.

=== MLBR ===
CENIC, for its part, decided to develop a rocket entirely from scratch, the Brazilian Microlauncher, MLBR. The rocket's construction team includes Cenic Engenharia, ETSYS, Concert Space, Delsis and Plasmahub, Bizzu Space, Fibraforte, Almeida's and Horuseye Tech. The MLBR will have a diameter of 1 meter, a height of 12 meters and a capacity of up to 40 kg for low earth orbit (LEO). Its launch is expected to take place in 2026.

In partnership with Skyroot Aerospace, Concert Technologies signed an MoU for development of an launch vehicle capable of carrying at least 100 kg (220 lb) payload to LEO. The initiative seeks to develop this rocket as intermediate solution between MLBR and Vikram-1. The vehicle has three solid fuel stages, but the third stage will be replaced by a liquid fuel engine in future versions that are already being developed in parallel.

==== Development ====
Development began in 2024, with the design of the engines and prototypes for small-scale tests. Between May 29 and 30, 2025, the team went through the Critical Design Review, which allowed the construction and testing phase to begin.

==== Specifications ====
The first stage engine, dubbed “Nauro” (N-90A) will contain 90 tons of propellant; the “Arion” engine, developed by Bizu Space for use in the future upper stage, will be liquid propellant.

== See also ==
- Avibrás
- Financiadora de Estudos e Projetos
- Human Landing System
- VLS-1
