= Kalam-series engines =

Solid propulsion rocket engines

- Country of origin: India
- Designer: Skyroot Aerospace
- Status: Active

Solid-fuel motor

The Kalam-series engines are a set of five solid-propellant carbon-composite rocket engines being developed by Skyroot Aerospace. The engines are named after India’s former president A. P. J. Abdul Kalam.

They are to be used in conjunction with the Raman engine during the launches of Vikram small-lift launch vehicles.

== List of engines ==
- Kalam-5
- Kalam-80
- Kalam-100, powering the third stage of Vikram-1.
- Kalam-250, powering the second stage of Vikram-1.
- Kalam-1200, powering the first stage of Vikram-1.
