= Vikramjit =

Vikramjit is an Indian male given name and may refer to:

- Vikramaditya, legendary king of ancient India
- Vikramjit (Tomara dynasty), 16th century Indian ruler who died in the First Battle of Panipat
- Vikramjit Singh (born 2003), Dutch cricketer
- Vikramjit Singh Sahney (born 1962), Indian entrepreneur and educationist
- Vikramjit Singh Chaudhary, Indian politician, member of the Punjab Legislative Assembly
- Vikramjit Singh Rooprai (born 1983), Indian activist and educationist

== See also ==
- Vikramaditya (disambiguation)
- Vikramjeet Virk (born 1984), Indian actor and model
- Vikramjeet Malik (born 1983), Indian cricketer
- Vikramjeet Maurya (1959–2022), Indian politician
- Bikramjit Basu, Indian academic
- Bikramjit Singh (born 1992), Indian footballer
- Bikramjit Singh Khalsa, Indian politician from Punjab
- Bikramjit Singh Majithia, Indian politician from Punjab
- Bikramjeet Kanwarpal (1968–2021), Indian film and television actor
- Bikramjeet Singh (born 1993), Indian footballer
