= Vikram (rocket family) =

Indian orbital class expendable rocket family

- Function: Small-lift launch vehicle
- Manufacturer: Skyroot Aerospace
- Country of origin: India

Size
- Height: Vikram-1: 20 m (66 ft)
- Stages: 4

Capacity

Payload to LEO (500 km @ 45° inclination)
- Mass: Vikram-1: 350 kg (770 lb); Vikram-1U: 550 kg (1,210 lb); Vikram-2: 900 kg (2,000 lb)

Payload to SSPO (500 km)
- Mass: Vikram-1: 260 kg (570 lb); Vikram-2: 600 kg (1,300 lb)

Associated rockets
- Comparable: Agnibaan; Alpha; Electron; Kaituozhe-1; SSLV

Launch history
- Status: Under development
- Launch sites: Satish Dhawan Space Centre; SSLV Launch Complex

First stage (Vikram-1)
- Powered by: Kalam-1000
- Maximum thrust: 1,000 kN (220,000 lb_{f})
- Propellant: Solid

Second stage (Vikram-1)
- Powered by: Kalam-250
- Maximum thrust: 250 kN (56,000 lb_{f})
- Propellant: Solid

Third stage (Vikram-1)
- Powered by: Kalam-100
- Maximum thrust: 100 kN (22,000 lb_{f})
- Propellant: Solid

Third stage (Vikram-2)
- Powered by: 1 x Dhawan-2
- Maximum thrust: 3.5 kN (790 lb_{f})
- Propellant: LOX/LNG

Fourth stage (Vikram-1)
- Powered by: 4 x Raman-1, 1 x Raman-2, & 4 x Raman Mini
- Maximum thrust: 5.26 kN (1,180 lb_{f})
- Propellant: N2O4/MMH

Vikram (Sanskrit, lit. 'Brave'; Namesake: Vikram Sarabhai) is an Indian family of small-lift launch vehicles being developed by Skyroot Aerospace, an Indian aerospace company.

Before a full orbital launch, a suborbital flight of rocket designated Vikram-S was launched on 18 November 2022 by the name of mission Prarambh (Sanskrit, lit. 'beginning').

== Overview ==
Skyroot Aerospace has successfully tested and launched Vikram-S, the sounding rocket, on 18 November 2022. Vikram-1 has successfully tested and launched on 18 July 2026, while Vikram-2 is currently under development.

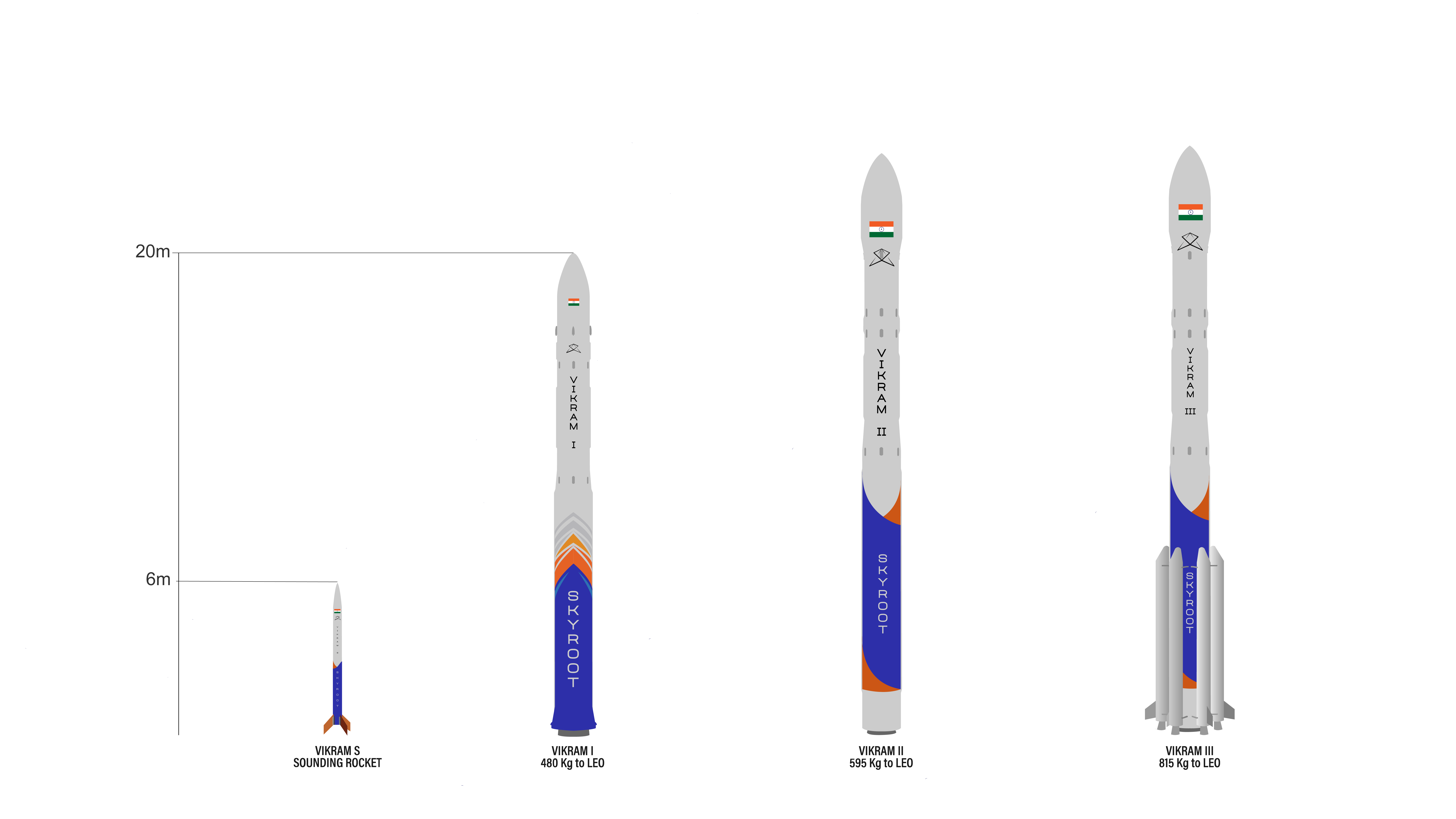
Vikram rocket family.

Planned rockets in the series
Launch vehicle	Payload capacity		First flight
Launch vehicle	SSPO (500 km)	Low Earth orbit (500 km; 45°)	First flight
Vikram-S (suborbital)	-	-	18 November 2022
Vikram-1	260 kg (570 lb)	350 kg (770 lb)	18 July 2026
Vikram-1U		550 kg (1,210 lb)	Q1 2027 (planned)
Vikram-2	600 kg (1,300 lb)	900 kg (2,000 lb)	2027 (planned)

=== Vikram-1 ===
The Vikram-1, first rocket in the series, has total of four stages, with three solid fuel-powered stages each with a burn time ranging between 80 and 100 seconds, and the fourth stage is powered Raman engine (Sanskrit, lit. 'enchanting', Namesake: C.V. Raman). The Raman engine is powered by MMH and NTO liquid fuels in a cluster of four engines that generate 5.26 kN thrust. These Raman Engines will be used to do final adjustments in the orbit of the stage. Vikram-1 is designed to lift 260 kg to a 500 km Sun synchronous polar orbit (SSPO) and 480 kg to 45º inclination in a 500 km low Earth orbit (LEO). Skyroot aims to conduct its maiden flight in 2026.

== Development and testing ==
- On 12 August 2020, Skyroot Aerospace successfully tested Vikram-1 launch vehicle's upper stage engine Raman.
- On 21 September 2020, several Ballistic Evaluation Motors (BEM) were fired to fine tune and qualify Vikram-1 solid stage propellant formulation.
- On 22 December 2020, Skyroot conducted a successful test firing of a solid rocket stage demonstrator 'Kalam-5'. The test was conducted at Solar Industries in Nagpur at 3 pm. The test cleared a 24 seconds long duration demonstration, achieving a peak thrust of 5.3 kN.
- On 20 June 2021, Vikram-1's third stage (Kalam-100) successfully completed the Proof Pressure Test (PPT).
- On 19 May 2022, has announced the successful completion of a full duration test-firing of its Vikram-1 rocket stage, representing a major milestone for the company. Named 'Kalam-100' after former president and the renowned Indian rocket scientist A.P.J. Abdul Kalam, the third stage of Vikram-1 produces a peak vacuum thrust of 100 kN (or ~10 Tons) and has a burn time of 108 sec. The rocket stage has been built with high-strength carbon fiber structure, solid fuel, novel thermal protection system, and carbon ablative nozzle. This testing will help Skyroot in development of orbital vehicle Vikram-1 and gives great confidence for the other rocket stages planned to be tested soon. This is best in class rocket stage of this size, with record propellant loading and firing duration and using all carbon composite structure for delivering best performance. This is largest rocket stage ever designed, manufactured, and tested completely in the private sector. There was a good match of test results with the design predictions in the very first attempt, which is a testimony to the team's capabilities. The state-of-the-art technology like carbon composite case, high propellant volumetric loading up to 94%, lighter EPDM based thermal protection system, and submerged nozzle have been validated through the successful static test.
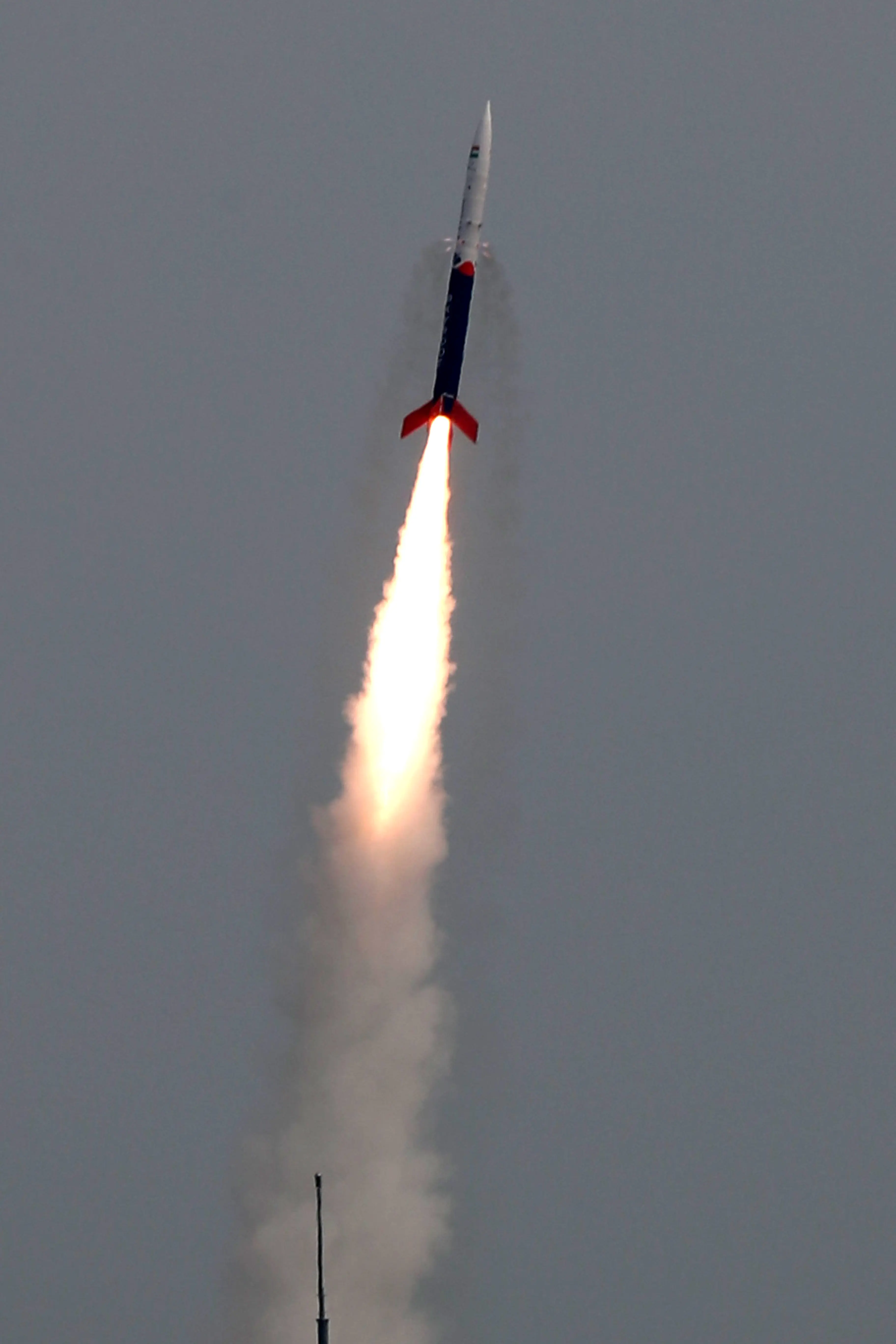
  Vikram-S
- On 18 November 2022, Skyroot Aerospace performed the maiden launch of the Vikram-S suborbital rocket, carrying payloads for Space Kidz, Bazoomq and N-Space Tech. The flight was successful, and the rocket reached an apogee of 89.5 km.
- On 4 April 2023, Skyroot Aerospace announced the 200-second fire-endurance test of enhanced, fully 3D-printed Dhawan-2 cryogenic engine that will power the upper stage of Vikram-2. It was considered a milestone for the cryogenic engine program, fueling the accelerated development of Vikram series.
- On 21 June 2023, Skyroot Aerospace announced the successful flight qualification testing of the Raman-1 engine to be used for roll attitude control of the Vikram-1 rocket. As Vikram-1 launches to space, aerodynamic disturbances and thrust misalignments can make the vehicle roll about its axis, needing a responsive roll-control system. It is provided by four Raman-1 engines through precise pulses, commanded by the autopilot algorithm of mission computer. Raman is a series of engines/thrusters using Earth storable hypergolic propellants for upper stage engine and attitude/reaction control in Vikram-1. Supported by ISRO and IN-SPACe, this test was done at the Liquid Propulsion Systems Centre (LPSC) of ISRO by a private company.
- On 4 July 2023, Skyroot Aerospace successfully completed the carbon-fiber winding and curing of stage 1 motor case for Vikram-1. With 1.7 meters diameter and 10 meters long, this was the largest hardware the company ever manufactured, and was built meticulously in-house using a multi-axis high precision robotic machine, powered by proprietary software. This stage, named 'Kalam-1200', is designed to generate a peak thrust of 120 tons.
- On 10 July 2023, Vikram-1 stage 2's Kalam-250 achieved the successful qualification test firing of its igniter. The igniter is used to safely, reliably and rapidly induce a combustion reaction in a solid rocket motor in a controlled and predictable manner under extreme temperature, pressure and vibration environments.
- On 18 December 2023, Skyroot successfully conducted a proof pressure test on Kalam-1200, the first stage of Vikram-1 rocket. Kalam-1200 is made up of ultra-light, high strength carbon composite and was subjected to extreme combustion pressure of 82.5 atmosphere.
- On 5 February 2025, Skyroot began conducting tests on the payload fairing made of carbon composite for Vikram-1. The company was also in the process of Integrating different components of the rocket at different facilities across India.
- On 21 May 2025, Skyroot Aerospace successfully qualified the ultra-low-shock pneumatic stage-separation system of Vikram-1, cleanly detaching stage 2 from stage 3 within 0.2s during ground tests.
- On 11 June 2025, the company completed the payload-fairing (PLF) separation test, validating the two-piece clamshell mechanism that will jettison the fairing once Vikram-1 reaches space.

== Flight history ==
No.	Date	Rocket	Spaceport	Payloads	Outcome	Remarks
1	18 July 2026	Vikram-1	SDSC FLP	(India) SCOPE; (India) SOLARAS S3	Success	Maiden flight of Vikram-1. Cosmoserve Space's robotic arm Embrace and an on-orbit demonstration from German company DCUBED were hosted on the upper stage of the mission. The rocket successfully reached the orbit in its first attempt.
2	Late 2026 (expected)	Vikram-1	SDSC FLP	(India) 4U SCOPE (India) 4U NILA III	Planned	Germany's Exospace will provide satellite deployment system. Italy's OhmSpace will have its electric propulsion system onboard NILA III.

== See also ==
- Small Satellite Launch Vehicle
- List of orbital launch systems
- Small-lift launch vehicle
- Launch vehicle
- List of Vikram launches
