= Vikramarka =

Vikramarka may refer to:

- Vikramaditya, a legendary emperor of ancient India
- Mallu Bhatti Vikramarka (born 1961), an Indian politician
- Bhatti Vikramarka, a 1960 Indian Telugu-language film

== See also ==
- Vikramarkudu, a 2006 Indian film by S. S. Rajamouli
- Raja Vikramarka (disambiguation)
- Vikramaditya (disambiguation)
- Vikram (disambiguation)
