= Raja Vikramarka =

Raja Vikramarka may refer to:

- Vikramaditya, a legendary emperor of ancient India
- Raja Vikramarka (1990 film), a 1990 Indian Telugu-language film
- Raja Vikramarka (2021 film), a 2021 Indian Telugu-language film

== See also ==
- Vikramarka (disambiguation)
- Vikramaditya (disambiguation)
- Vikram (disambiguation)
