= List of Vikram launches =

List of rocket launches by Skyroot Aerospace

This article lists all the previous and planned launches of the Vikram rocket family developed by Skyroot Aerospace. Its first launch with Vikram-S as India's first private rocket took place successfully in November 2022. On 18 July 2026, the launch of Vikram-1, India's first private orbital rocket, became successful on its maiden attempt. The next rocket, Vikram-2, is scheduled for launch in mid-2027.

== Launch history ==
=== 2022-2029 ===
Date/Time (UTC)	Rocket	Launch site	Regime	Status
Date/Time (UTC)	Rocket	Flight Number	Payload / Operator	Function
Date/Time (UTC)	Remarks			
18 November 2022/06:00 UTC	(India) Vikram-S	Satish Dhawan - Sounding Rocket Complex	Suborbital	Success
18 November 2022/06:00 UTC	(India) Vikram-S	—N/a	Skyroot Aerospace	Technology demonstration
18 November 2022/06:00 UTC	First suborbital flight by any Indian private company.			

=== 2026-2029 ===
Date/Time (UTC)	Rocket	Launch site	Regime	Status
Date/Time (UTC)	Rocket	Flight Number	Payload / Operator	Function
Date/Time (UTC)	Remarks			
18 July 2026/06:35	(India) Vikram-1	SDSC FLP	LEO	Success
18 July 2026/06:35	(India) Vikram-1	Test Flight-1	(India) SCOPE; (India) SOLARAS S3; (India) EMBRACE; Mission Aagaman; (Germany) UD3PP; (Germany) mD3RN; (India) COSMIC BLOOM; (India) MICRO ART TRIBUTE	Technology demonstration
18 July 2026/06:35	First orbital mission by any Indian private company, 'Mission Aagaman' (lit. 'the arrival'). The mission is intended to demonstrate the rocket's propulsion, guidance, and stage-separation systems while carrying domestic and international payloads. The rocket successfully reached the orbit in its first attempt.			

== Future launches ==
Date/Time (UTC)	Rocket	Launch site	Regime	Status
Date/Time (UTC)	Rocket	Flight Number	Operator	Function
Date/Time (UTC)	Remarks			
2026	(India) Vikram-1	SDSC FLP	LEO	Planned
2026	(India) Vikram-1	TBA	TBA	TBA
NET 2027	(India) Vikram-2	TBA	LEO	Planned
NET 2027	(India) Vikram-2	TBA	TBA	TBA

== See also ==
- List of Satish Dhawan Space Centre launches
- List of Agnibaan launches
