= Bikram =

Bikram may refer to:

== People ==
- Bikram Choudhury (born 1944), founder of Bikram Yoga
- Bikram Grewal, Indian ornithologist
- Bikram Keshari Deo (1952–2009), Indian politician
- Bikram Singh (musician) (born 1980), bhangra musician and lawyer
- Bikram Singh Majithia, Indian politician

== Other uses ==
- Bikram, Patna, a town in India
- Bikram Yoga, a form of "hot yoga"

== See also ==
- Vikram (disambiguation)
