= Raman (rocket engine) =

Rocket engine manufactured by Skyroot Aerospace

- Country of origin: India
- Status: Active

Liquid-fuel engine
- Propellant: N_{2}O_{4} / UDMH

Performance
- Thrust: Raman-1: 890 N (200 lb_{f}); Raman-2: 820 N (180 lb_{f}) (SL), 1,500 N (340 lb_{f}) (vac); Raman Mini: 50 N (11 lb_{f})

The Raman engine is a bipropellant liquid-fuel rocket engine manufactured by Skyroot Aerospace that will be used in its Vikram family of rockets. It is named after Indian Nobel laureate C. V. Raman.

== Description ==
It uses unsymmetrical dimethylhydrazine and hypergolic propellants. Its injector plate is completely 3D printed. The upper stage engine will be used in a cluster of four Raman-1, one Raman-2, and four Raman Mini in the fourth stage of the Vikram-1 rocket, which are capable of producing the total thrust of 5.26 kilonewtons (1,180 lbf) in vacuum. Raman-1 engine is capable of producing 890 newtons (200 lbf) of thrust, which four-engine clustered configuration gave a total thrust of 3.56 kilonewtons (800 lbf), while Raman-2 engine is capable of producing 1.5 kilonewtons (340 lbf) of thrust in vacuum, and Raman Mini engine is capable of producing 50 newtons (11 lbf) of thrust, which four-engine clustered configuration gave a total thrust of 200 newtons (45 lbf). While lower than many other rocket engines, it is required for conducting precise orbit adjustments.

== Development and testing ==
- On 12 August 2020, Skyroot Aerospace successfully tested the engine for the first time.
- Skyroot Aerospace tested the Raman-2 engine, designed for vacuum conditions, by firing it for 200 seconds on a ground test stand. The team used water injection to mitigate flow separation in the vacuum-optimized nozzle, allowing accurate testing at sea level. This test provided critical data for the Vikram-1 rocket's fourth stage, advancing India's private space efforts.

== List of engines ==
- Raman-1
- Raman-2
- Raman Mini
