= Vikramaditya (disambiguation) =

Vikramaditya was a legendary emperor of ancient India.

Vikramaditya may also refer to:

== People ==
- Chandragupta Vikramaditya (Chandragupta II), the 375–415 CE Gupta emperor
- Yasodharman of Malwa (6th century); adopted the title Vikramaditya
- Vikramaditya I (655–680), Chalukya king
- Vikramaditya II (733–744), Chalukya king
- Vikramaditya V (1008–1015), Chalukya king
- Vikramaditya VI (1076–1126), Chalukya king
- Hemachandra Vikramaditya (Hemu), 16th-century Hindu emperor
- Vikramaditya (actor), Indian actor in Tamil cinema
- Vikramaditya Singh (disambiguation)

== Other uses ==
- INS Vikramaditya, Kiev-class aircraft carrier of the Indian Navy
- Vikramaditya-class aircraft carrier, a subclass of the Kiev-class aircraft carrier
- Vikramaditya (film), a 1945 Hindi historical drama film

== See also ==
- Vikram (disambiguation)
- Vikramarka (disambiguation)
- Raja Vikramarka (disambiguation)
- Vikramjit (disambiguation)
- Vikramaadhithan, a 1962 Indian Tamil-language film by T. R. Raghunath and N. S. Ramadas
