= Finep =

Government agency of Brazil

logo of Finep

Finep (Portuguese: Financiadora de Estudos e Projetos, Funding Authority for Studies and Projects, or Financier of Studies and Projects) is an organization of the Brazilian federal government under the Ministry of Science of Technology, devoted to funding of science and technology in the country.
