= Vikram 32 =

Indian microprocessor

Vikram 3201
General information
- Launched: 2025
- Designed by: Indian Space Research Organisation
- Common manufacturer: Semiconductor Laboratory (SCL) in Chandigarh
- Max. CPU clock rate: to 100 MHz

Architecture and classification
- Application: Designed for launch vehicle avionics and space missions
- Instructions: Proprietary/custom instruction set (designed by ISRO)

Vikram 3201 is India’s first fully indigenous 32-bit space-grade microprocessor. It was developed with the help of the Semiconductor Laboratory (SCL) in Chandigarh, by the Indian Space Research Organisation (ISRO). It was launched by Narendra Modi In September 2025.

== History ==
Vikram 3201 was designed to specifically fit launch vehicle applications and features a customized instruction set architecture that supports advance programming in Ada, with C language support currently still in development process. It features software tools that were developed in India, including a compiler, assembler, linker, and simulator, which demonstrate India's ability to produce mission-critical microelectronics for space applications.
