= Vikram (name) =

Male given name

- Gender: male

Origin
- Meaning: valorous—one who is wise, brave and strong as well as victorious

Other names
- Related names: Vickram

Vikram (Sanskrit: विक्रम), also Vickram, Vickrum, is a given name of Sanskrit origin. The most common understanding of the name Vikram is valorous—one who is wise, brave and strong as well as victorious. Like many Hindu names, the name Vikram has a number of significant interpretations and connections.

== Etymology ==
=== Sanskrit ===
In Sanskrit, Vikrama is composed of two roots:

- vi: abbreviated form of the root vis-, meaning "to work"
- Krama: a step, stride, or path

A literal interpretation of this combination is a "worker's stride". This is the original etymology.

== Interpretations ==
=== Philosophical ===
In the Hindu philosophy context, the primary etymological interpretation of the name Vikram as "worker's stride" can signify a range of concepts around one who undertakes purposeful action. The notion of "work is worship" is central to the karma yoga branch of the Yoga path of Hindu spirituality. A person's karma consists of the action they take relative to their duties, called dharma. One's dharma is broadly defined by one's age and position in life—which may be student hood, familial duties or discipleship of a guru among others. In karma yoga, the diligent performance of life duties is the path to Nirvana. The name Vikram then suggests one whose primary path is that of a karma yogi, with supporting commitment to the paths of devotion (bhakti) or knowledge (jnana). As these paths are intertwined, the name Vikram may be applied to one who embodies these principle of devoted, thoughtful action. When practiced by a man as a matter of course, it may be recognized as valor—wise, diligent, brave, and strong at once.

=== Literary ===
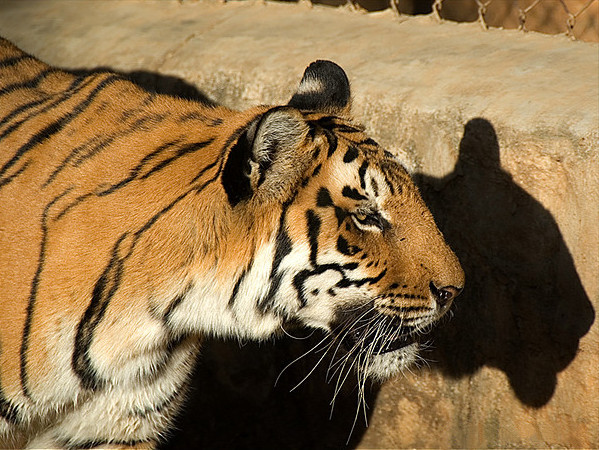
- The elucidation of the three major yogic paths (karma, bhakti, jnana) of yoga is a primary focus of the Bhagavad Geeta, in which Krishna (an avatar of Vishnu) urges Prince Arjuna to engage in his dutiful action, which in that case is to lead his army into war. Arjuna's courage is the most widely known example of the spirit of human valor inspired by an avatar of Vishnu.

=== Vaishnavite ===
As a name, Vikram is commonly known to be derived from Vishnu, the Godhead of the Vaishnavite tradition. He is the deva (or deity) who represents the Protector aspect of the trimurti of Creation, Protection, and Destruction, personified as Brahma, Vishnu, and Shiva in the Vedic tradition. There are many stories and depictions of Vishnu, as avatars Rama, Krishna, Buddha, Balaji et cetera. The practice of Shaktism, worship of the Divine Mother, has replaced Brahma worship as the third major branch of Hindu henotheism. In the henotheistic and monotheistic Vaishnavite perspectives, Vishnu is the Supreme Lord of all, encompassing and manifesting the Shiva and Shakti aspects of God within his essence the all-powerful loving, caring Protector.

==== Vishnu's stride ====
The Sanskrit word -krama is a root word meaning "step or stride", so the name Vikrama can be understood to mean Vishnu's stride in itself, or as a name which reflects the qualities of Vishnu's stride. In Vedic scripture, Vishnu's stride is said to be over the Earth, the Sky, and the all-pervading omnipresent essence of the Universe.

===== Connection to Lakshmi =====
Among the many personifications of the Divine Mother is Lakshmi, Vishnu's wife. According to Shaktism, a man's wife is the source of his shakti, or loving, divine energy. In this sense, Lakshmi powers Vishnu's Stride, and the name Vikrama may be interpreted as signifying the active male expression of shakti.

===== Connection to Surya =====
In the Vedas, Vishnu's stride is also depicted as the rising, setting, and absence of the sun. The deity Surya is the primary name for the sun deity, one of the most ancient in the Hindu tradition. This name literally means:

- Sur: Sun
- ya: present infinitive verb modifier

Surya's name can be loosely translated literally as "the moving of the sun". In this sense, the deity Surya is then metaphorically one personification Vishnu's stride. In Smartism, Surya is commonly believed to be another manifestation of Vishnu, and is worshipped as a deity in his own right.

==== Vishnu himself ====
In addition to most literally referring to Vishnu's stride, the name Vikram appears in Hindu scripture as an alternate name of Vishnu himself.

===== Appearances in Vishnu Sahasranama =====
Vikram appears one of the first few names in the Vishnu Sahasranama—a tributary series of lyrics that sing the praise of Vishnu and ascribe one thousand and eight names (Sahasranama) to Him—each describing a quality of his perceived magnificence. The following quotes are from this complete listing and interpretation of the Vishnu Sahasranama in the various instances where the name Vikram occurs.

====== Stanza 9 ======
eesvaro vikramee dhanvee medhaavee vikramah kramah (75) Vikramee -One full of prowess (Vikrama), courage, daring. Or, it can be One who has "Special foot steps". This term commemorates how the Lord, as Vamana, measured with His tiny three steps all the three worlds. (78) Vikramah -While describing the term Vikramee (75) we had already explained the meaning contents of Vikrama, and thus Vikrama is an appellation that had come to Vishnu as a result of His Supernatural Act of measuring the universe with three steps. Shankaracharya's interpretation is He who crosses (Kramana), i.e., transcends samsara. Or one who has Vih, bird, i.e., Garuda as His mount. Also, Vi means the "king-of-birds", the white-necked eagle; Krama means steps and, therefore, 'movement or travel'. In this sense Vikrama can mean: "One who rides on the white- eagle (mind) is Vishnu"-who is described as having Garuda for His vehicle (Vaahanam).

====== Stanza 55 ======
jeeva vinayitaa-saakshee mukundo-amitavikramah

"(58) Amita-vikramah -Of immeasurable Prowess or One whose step (Vikramah) is immeasurable (Amita). The Lord in his Vamana-incarnation measured the three worlds by His three steps, and, therefore, He gained the title of 'Trivikramaha'. Since the Lord's steps are so vast, they are, indeed, immeasurable-Amita- Vikramah."

====== Stanza 56 ======
aanando nandano nandah satyadharmaa trivikramah. (530) Trivikramah –"One who has taken the three steps". One who has, in three steps, conquered the three worlds in his Vamana-incarnation. The spiritual seeker has only to take three steps to reach the Centre of the Self in him- self. Once he has stepped across the fields-of-experiences in the waking, dream and deep-sleep conditions, he has reached the Infinite Consciousness, the Atman. The very term "Tri" in Sanskrit means "the three-worlds". "The greatest men of reflection have declared the three fields-of-experiences (Loka) by the simple term 'Tri,"-.

=== Alternative Vaishnavite interpretations ===
==== Rama ====
In cases of Indian diaspora where the Devanagari spelling of Vikram is not used, the name has also been interpreted to refer to the victorious Lord Rama of the Ramayana epic. The epitome of this victory is that of King Ram as he returns from Lanka with his bride Sita having defeated the demon Ravana to reclaim his throne. In India, this possible association may be a secondary influence the selection of the name, especially among the Kshatriya caste, who commonly worship the Rama incarnation of Vishnu. Abroad, the Hindu Philosophical and Vaishnavite meanings may sometimes only be a secondary influence on the selection of the name.

== Namesakes ==
=== Historical ===
While the name Vikram did not originate from the king Vikramaditya who ruled India for 39 years (375–414 AD), he may be the namesake of many who are so named. Vikramaditya literally means Strength [of the] Sun. Aditya means son of Aditi, the most famous of whom was Surya, the deity representing the Sun. Vikramaditya is a title for a king, many of whom have been given this appellation—one of the more famous ones being Chandragupta II of the Gupta Empire.

=== Literary ===
King Vikrama's Adventures is a translation of the Vikramacharita, a popular set of 32 tales featuring the historical King Vikramaditya, but which were composed most likely over a millennium after he lived. Another collection of 25 folk stories called the Baital Pachisi is available in another English translation entitled Vikram and the Vampire by Sir Richard Francis Burton in 1870.

These two sets of tales about king Vikramaditya have been quite widely popular throughout the Indian subcontinent for many hundreds of years in the oral and written traditions, each evolving local translations and modifications. They are much more commonly known than the scriptural sources.

=== Modern ===
There are many public figures named Vikram or Vickram including movie actors, prominent writers, as well as a number of lesser-known politicians and business leaders.

== Notable individuals with name ==
- Vikramaditya, legendary king
- Vikram Batra, Param Vir Chakra holder, kargil martyr who laid down his life while saving others
- Vikram Deo Verma, the last official king of Jeypore, Pro-Chancellor of Andhra University, liberal, philanthropist, reformer, playwright, writer-scholar, Kalaprapurna Doctor of Letters
- Vikram Bhatnagar, international sportsman in shooting
- Vikram Gokhale (born 1940), Hindi and Marathi language Indian film, theatre and television actor
- Vikram Sarabhai, father of India's space programme
- Sir Vikram Dev III KCIE, king of Jeypore, administrator, reformer, philanthropist
- Vikram Seth, award-winning novelist and poet
- Vikram Sood, Indian researcher now based in Gurgaon
- Vikram Singh Barn, British YouTuber (known online as Vikkstar123), part of The Sidemen
- Vikram a.k.a. Chiyaan Vikram (Indian actor)
