= Vikram Vedha (disambiguation) =

Vikram Vedha is a 2017 Indian Tamil-language neo-noir action thriller film.

Vikram Vedha may also refer to:

- Vikram Vedha (soundtrack), the soundtrack album of the 2017 film
- Vikram Vedha (2022 film), a 2022 Indian Hindi-language neo-noir action-thriller film, remake of the 2017 film
