= Wickrama =

Wickrama is both a given name and a surname. Notable people with the name include:

- Wickrama Bogoda (1940–2013), Sri Lankan actor
- Buddhi Wickrama (1939–2023), Sri Lankan actor
- Lionel Wickrama (1946–2023), Sri Lankan actor
- Pubudu Wickrama (born 1980), Sri Lankan cricketer
