= Vikramaditya Singh =

Vikramaditya Singh may refer to:

- Vikramaditya Singh of Mewar (1517–1534), maharana of Mewar Kingdom from 1531–1534
- Vikramaditya Singh (Jammu and Kashmir politician) (born 1964), Indian businessman and politician
- Vikramaditya Singh (Himachal Pradesh politician) (born 1989), Indian politician
- Vikramaditya Singh, a ruler of the Dumraon Raj
