= Austral Launch Vehicle =

Space vehicle proposal

The Austral Launch Vehicle (ALV) is a concept for a re-usable launch vehicle first stage. It would use fly-back UAV boosters to reduce overall launch costs.

== Proponents ==
The ALV concept is being developed by Heliaq Advanced Engineering and the University of Queensland from Brisbane, Queensland (Australia). Additional involvement is from the United Kingdom, France and South Africa.

== System ==
=== First stage ===
The ALV system uses between one and six boosters connected to a core. The boosters each have a V-tail system that, on launch, act as stabilising fins; during the return flight and landing, the V-tail provides directional control. After first stage separation, the boosters coast (ballistic cruise). After re-entry, at around 350 km down range, the wings deploy and the boosters manoeuvre for return flight to the launch site, using a deployable propeller driven by an engine, acting as a large UAV.

=== Second stage ===
The SPARTAN Second Stage core flies on after First Stage booster separation, with the stack. The core separates and returns to the atmosphere and Earth and is not recovered.

=== Third stage ===
After fairing separation, the Third Stage and Payload fly to orbit. Payload separation is as required for the mission. Third Stage deorbits and burns up on entry.

== Testing ==
Flight tests were scheduled for late in 2015. The first successful flight of the ALV was completed on 23 December 2015.

== Associated projects ==
- University of Queensland's SPARTAN-1 scramjet project

== See also ==
- Australian Space Agency
