= Vikram-S =

Indian sounding rocket, developed by Skyroot Aerospace

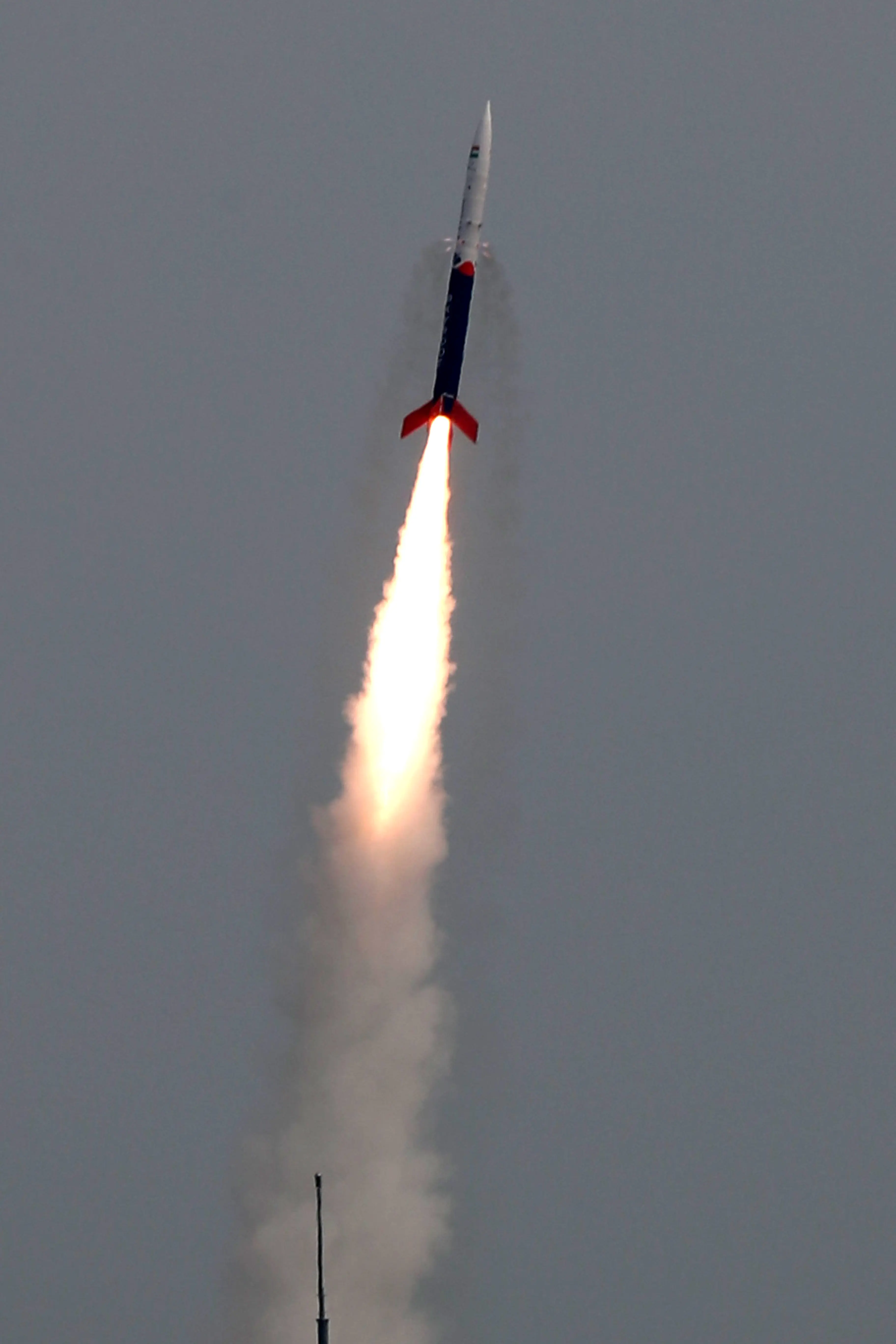
- Vikram-S sub-orbital rocket.
- Function: Sounding rocket
- Manufacturer: Skyroot Aerospace
- Country of origin: India

Size
- Height: 6 m (20 ft)
- Diameter: 0.37 m (1 ft 3 in)
- Mass: 545 kg (1,202 lb)
- Stages: 1

Associated rockets
- Comparable: Agnibaan SOrTeD; Black Brant; Rohini

Launch history
- Status: Future unknown
- Launch sites: Satish Dhawan Space Centre
- Total launches: 1
- Success(es): 1
- First flight: 18 November 2022

Sustainer stage (Vikram-S)
- Powered by: Kalam 80
- Maximum thrust: 70 kN (16,000 lb_{f})
- Propellant: Solid

Vikram-S is India's first privately built suborbital rocket. Its maiden flight lifted on 18 November 2022 at 11 A.M. from Sounding Rocket Complex, Sriharikota. The rocket is designed and developed by Skyroot Aerospace.

== History ==
Vikram-S, India's first privately built rocket was launched on 18 November 2022 by Skyroot Aerospace from Sriharikota. The first mission of the rocket launch has been designated as 'Prarambh', meaning beginning. As a tribute the rocket has been named after Vikram Sarabhai, who is considered as the father of India's space programme.

== Rocket ==
Vikram-S rocket is developed by Skyroot Aerospace and the launch was assisted by ISRO and the Indian National Space Promotion and Authorisation Centre (IN–SPACe). The rocket reached an apogee of 89.5km.

== Launch history ==
| S.No | Date / time (UTC) | Rocket, Configuration | Launch site | Payload | Orbit | Customer | Status |
|---|---|---|---|---|---|---|---|
| 1. | 18 November 2022 | Vikram-S | Satish Dhawan | (India) | Suborbital | —N/a | Success |

== See also ==
- Space industry of India
  - Rohini (rocket family)
  - Agnibaan SOrTeD
  - Vikram-I
  - Vikram-II
  - Vikram (rocket family)
  - Skyroot Aerospace
  - List of Vikram launches
