= Skyroot Aerospace =

Indian spaceflight company

Skyroot Aerospace Private Limited

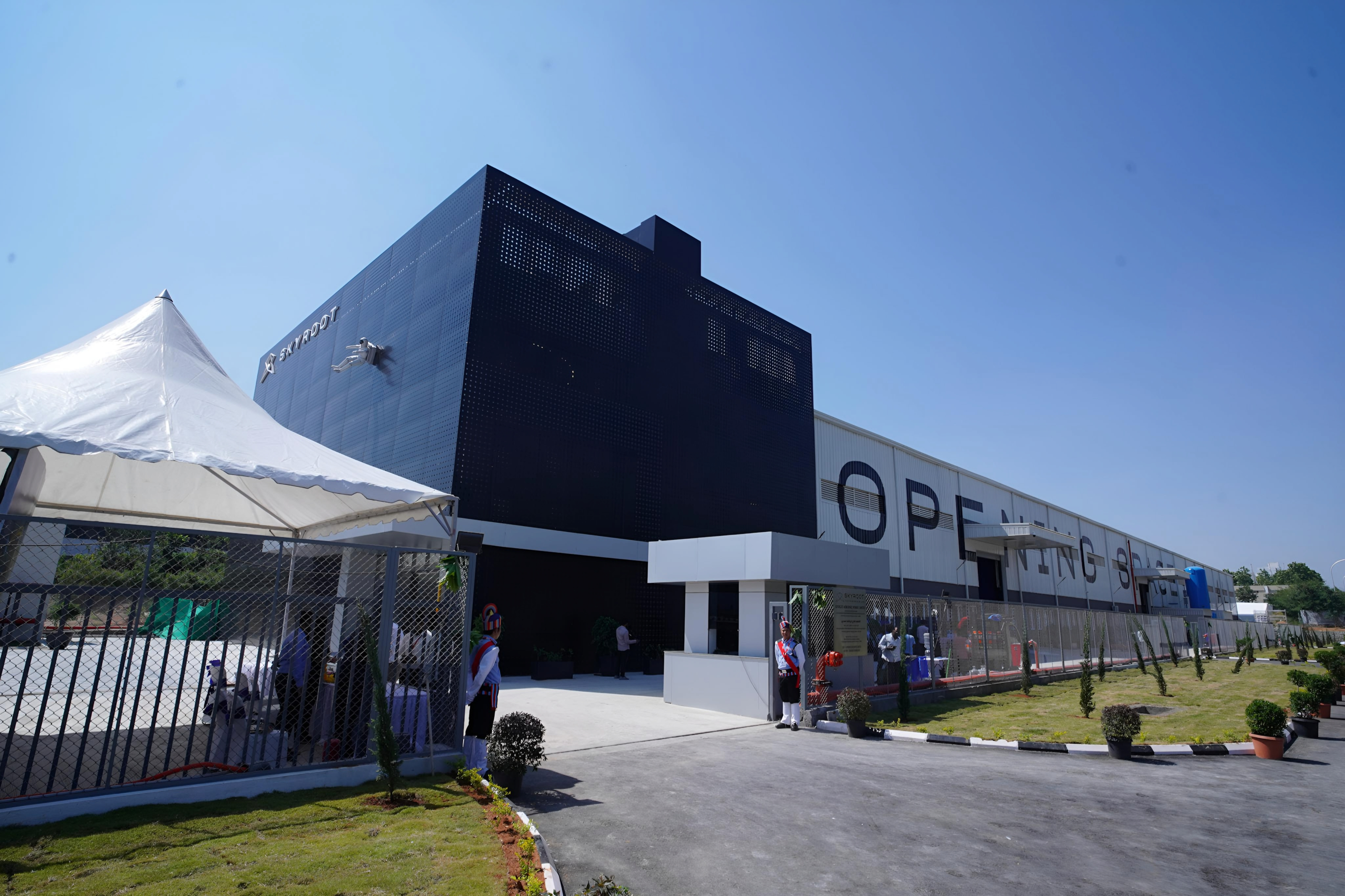
- Skyroot headquarters in Hyderabad
- Type: Private
- Industry: Space
- Founded: 12 June 2018; 8 years ago
- Founders: Pawan Kumar Chandana; Naga Bharath Daka
- Headquarters: MAX-Q, Hyderabad, Telangana, India
- Key people: Pawan Kumar Chandana (Co-founder, CEO & CTO); Naga Bharath Daka (Co-founder & COO)
- Products: Launch vehicles
- Services: Launch service provider
- Revenue: ▲₹100.6 crore (US$10 million) (FY26)
- Number of employees: 1,000+ (2026)
- Website: www.skyroot.in

Skyroot Aerospace Private Limited is an Indian private aerospace manufacturer and commercial launch service provider headquartered in Hyderabad, Telangana. The company was founded by two former ISRO scientists, Pawan Kumar Chandana, and Naga Bharath Daka.

On 18 November 2022, Skyroot became the first private company in India to launch a suborbital rocket, Vikram-S. On 18 July 2026, Skyroot successfully launched India's first private orbital class rocket Vikram-1 into orbit, making India the third country with a private orbital launch capability after the U.S. and China.

== History ==
=== Founding and early development ===
Initial logo of Skyroot Aerospace

Skyroot Aerospace was founded in 2018 by former ISRO scientists Pawan Kumar Chandana and Naga Bharath Daka. The company sought to develop commercially competitive launch vehicles for the global small satellite market.

The company emerged during a period of increasing government support for private participation in India's space industry. Reforms introduced in 2020 enabled private firms to access certain ISRO facilities and created a regulatory framework under the oversight of Indian National Space Promotion and Authorisation Centre (IN-SPACe).

During its initial years, Skyroot focused on developing launch vehicle technologies, and manufacturing processes aimed at reducing launch costs and production times. The company adopted technologies including carbon-composite structures, 3D printing, and modular launch vehicle designs.

=== Mission Prarambh ===
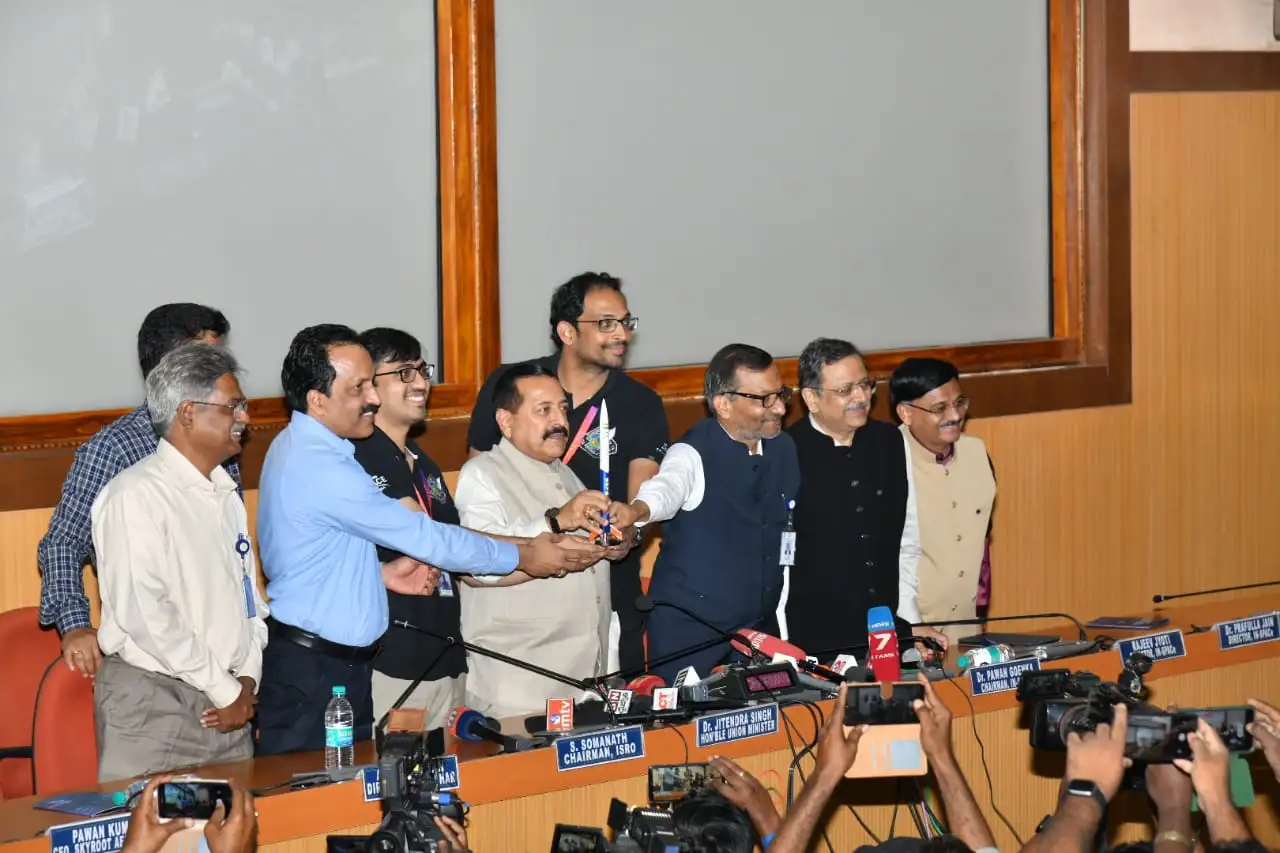
Pawan Kumar Chandana (CEO & CTO) and Naga Bharath Daka (COO) (standing on left and right respectively of Union minister Jitendra Singh in middle) on the eve of successful Vikram-S launch

On 18 November 2022, Skyroot launched Vikram-S, a suborbital rocket, from the Satish Dhawan Space Centre in Sriharikota under a mission designated Prarambh (lit. 'the beginning'). Vikram-S used the existing launch pad and ground support system infrastructure provided by the government of India at Satish Dhawan Space Centre (SDSC). The mission reached an altitude of approximately 89.5 km (55.6 mi) and marked the first successful launch of a privately developed rocket from India. The event was widely regarded as a milestone in the development of India's private space industry.

=== Expansion and funding ===
Following the Vikram-S mission, Skyroot raised capital from domestic and international investors. On 30 October 2023, the company announced that it had raised US$27.5 million in a pre-Series C funding round led by Temasek Holdings that brought its cumulative funding to approximately US$95 million.

On 21 January 2025, the Government of Telangana signed a MoU with Skyroot Aerospace at the World Economic Forum to establish a private rocket manufacturing, integration, and testing facility in Telangana with an estimated investment of ₹500 crore (US$52 million).

On 7 May 2026, following its latest funding round of approximately US$60 million, Skyroot Aerospace crossed US$1.1 billion in valuation. With this, it became India's first space-tech unicorn.

=== Mission Aagaman ===
On 2 July 2026, the company announced a launch window from 12 July to 4 August 2026 for its first orbital mission, 'Mission Aagaman' (lit. 'the arrival'), using the Vikram-1 launch vehicle from SDSC. The mission is intended to demonstrate the rocket's propulsion, guidance, and stage-separation systems while carrying domestic and international payloads.

On 18 July 2026, the launch was successful, with the mission meeting all its objectives and deploying payload at an altitude of 450 km (280 mi). Skyroot became the first private Indian company to successfully reach space in its first attempt. This made India the third country in the world after the U.S. and China to have rocket launch by private company.

=== Other launches ===
On 14 October 2026, Reflect Orbital announced a contract with Skyroot Aerospace for two dedicated satellite launches. The agreement includes one flight aboard Vikram-1 and a second on Vikram-1U, an upgraded variant equipped with strap-on boosters that increases payload capacity from 350 to 550 kg (770 to 1,210 lb) to LEO.

Financial terms and specific launch dates were not publicly disclosed. The launches will deploy Reflect Orbital's planned satellite constellation, which is designed to redirect sunlight to specific locations on Earth using orbital mirrors. The company intends for the technology to extend the operating hours of solar farms and assist in industrial and search-and-rescue operations.

The partnership occurred amidst a global shortage of commercial launch capacity, largely attributed to the phaseout of SpaceX's Falcon 9 rocket, Reflect Orbital CEO Ben Nowack cited this industry-wide capacity shortage and the need for schedule certainty as primary factors in securing the dedicated flights with Skyroot.

== Hardware ==
=== Launch vehicles ===
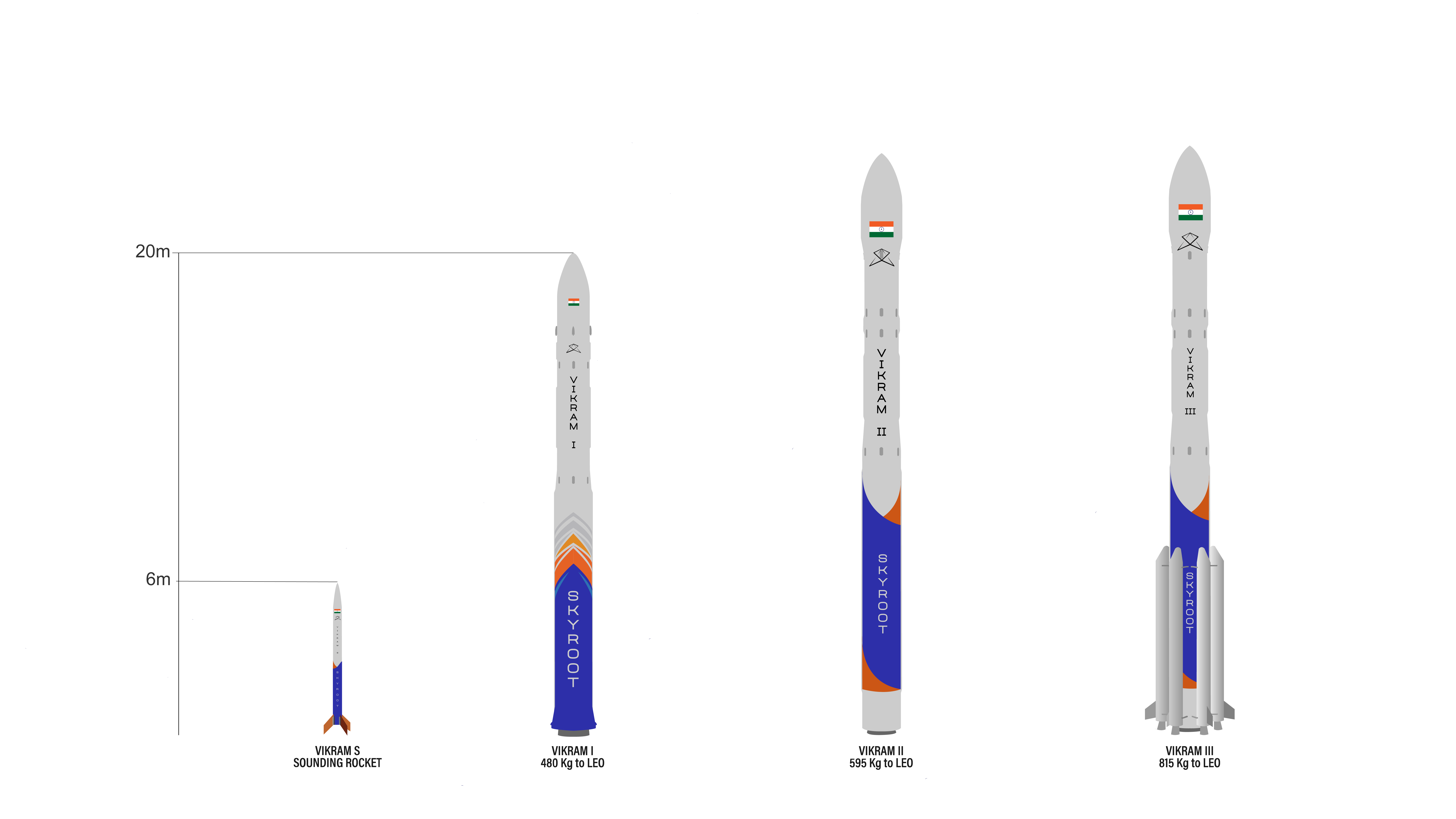
Vikram rocket family

Vikram series launch vehicles
Launch vehicle	Payload capacity		First flight
Launch vehicle	SSPO (500 km)	Low Earth orbit (500 km; 45°)	First flight
Vikram-S (suborbital)	–	–	18 November 2022
Vikram-1	260 kg (570 lb)	350 kg (770 lb)	18 July 2026
Vikram-2	600 kg (1,300 lb)	900 kg (2,000 lb)	2027 (planned)

Vikram-1

Schematic representation of Vikram-1

Vikram-1 is a four-stage small-lift launch vehicle. The first launch of Vikram-1 took place on 18 July 2026.

Vikram-2

Vikram-2 is an under-development small-lift launch vehicle. The rocket will use an upper stage cryogenic engine powered by the Dhawan-series rocket engine.

=== Rocket engines ===
==== Solid rocket motors ====
===== Kalam-100 =====
The Kalam-100 (named after A. P. J. Abdul Kalam) is the third-stage solid rocket motor of Vikram-1. The stage produces a peak vacuum thrust of approximately 100 kN (or ~10 tons). In April 2025, Skyroot conducted successful static firing of Kalam-100 featuring an advanced flex-nozzle system for thrust vector control. The test lasted over 102 seconds and formed part of the qualification programme for the maiden orbital flight of Vikram-1.

===== Kalam-250 =====
The Kalam-250 is the second-stage solid rocket motor of Vikram-1. for the second stage of the Vikram-1 launch vehicle. It was successfully static-tested on 27 March 2024 at ISRO's Satish Dhawan Space Centre, validating its 85-second burn and critical propulsion systems.

===== Kalam-1200 =====
The Kalam-1200 is the first-stage solid rocket motor of Vikram-1. On 8 August 2025, Skyroot Aerospace successfully conducted the first static test of the Kalam-1200 solid rocket motor at SDSC, Sriharikota. The 110 second test validated the booster of the Vikram-1.

==== Earth-storable rocket engine ====
===== Raman engine =====
Raman (named after C. V. Raman) is a liquid-fuel upper stage engine of Vikram-1. The upper stage engine will be used in a cluster of four Raman-1, one Raman-2, and four Raman Mini in the fourth stage of the Vikram-1 rocket, which are capable of producing the total thrust of 5.26 kilonewtons (1,180 lbf) in vacuum.

==== Cryogenic rocket engines ====
===== Dhawan-I =====
On 25 September 2020, Skyroot Aerospace unveiled the Dhawan-I (named after Satish Dhawan) upper stage cryogenic engine that will power heavier-lift systems such as Vikram-2. This is India's first privately developed small cryogenic engine running on liquefied natural gas (LNG) and liquid oxygen (LOX). Dhawan-I is 3D printed and designed with a regenerative cooling configuration. The engine is made by using superalloys.

===== Dhawan-II =====
On 5 April 2023, Skyroot announced the successful completion of a 200-second endurance static-fire test of its Dhawan-II engine, showcasing the viability of large-scale additive manufacturing for cryogenic propulsion.

===== Dhawan-III =====
The Dhawan-III engine represents an evolution of the earlier Dhawan-I and Dhawan-II engines, incorporating improvements aimed at future reusable launch vehicles and advanced upper-stage propulsion systems. In February 2026, Skyroot announced that Dhawan-III had successfully completed a 145-second endurance static-fire test. The firing was conducted on an indigenous mobile test stand designed and built in-house by the company. The test was intended to validate the engine's performance, combustion stability, and operational reliability over an extended duration.

== Facilities ==
Skyroot Aerospace has modern facilities for designing, building, testing, and assembling rockets and their components. These facilities help the company develop launch vehicles, test rocket engines, prepare missions, and support commercial satellite launches with advanced engineering and technology.

=== MAX-Q ===
On 24 October 2023, the largest private integrated rocket development facility in India was unveiled by Skyroot Aerospace. It is situated next to the Rajiv Gandhi International Airport and spans 60,000 square feet. With space for about 300 personnel, this facility will host Skyroot's integrated design, manufacturing, and testing infrastructure for developing rockets.

=== Infinity Campus ===
On 27 November 2025, Prime Minister Narendra Modi inaugurated the Infinity Campus of Skyroot Aerospace. Spread across 200,000 square feet in Hyderabad, this facility will be able to design, manufacture, integrate, and test a number of launch vehicles and produce one orbital rocket each month.

== Industry collaboration ==
An agreement has been signed by Nibe Space, a division of Nibe Defence and Aerospace on 9 September 2024, with Skyroot Aerospace, AgniKul Cosmos, Centum Electronics, SpaceFields, Sisir Radar, CYRAN AI Solutions, and Larsen & Toubro for the launch of India's first constellation of multi-sensor, all-weather, high-revisit Earth observation satellites.

On 25 June 2025, Skyroot Aerospace and Axiom Space signed an MoU to work together to increase access to LEO. Skyroot Aerospace and Axiom Space will look into orbital and launch systems that are integrated for next trips to Axiom Station and beyond. The two businesses intend to look into potential joint ventures for the construction of space infrastructure. By connecting Axiom's under-construction commercial space station and other LEO projects with Skyroot's upcoming Vikram-1 launch capability, the partnership hopes to create a new logistics corridor for research payloads, orbital data-center nodes, and upcoming commercial missions.

On 7 October 2026, Skyroot Aerospace and Brazilian company Concert Technologies SA signed an MoU for development of an launch vehicle capable of carrying at least 100 kg (220 lb) payload to LEO. The initiative seeks to develop this rocket as intermediate solution between Brazilian MLBR and Vikram-1. Concert Technologies is a consortium member of the MLBR.

== See also ==
- Space industry of India
  - ISRO
  - IN–SPACe
  - Indian Space Association
- List of private spaceflight companies
  - AgniKul Cosmos
  - Vikram-1
  - Vikram-2
  - Vikram-S
  - Vikram (rocket family)
  - Kalam-series engines
  - List of Vikram launches
