= Vikram-2 =

Indian space launch vehicle developed by Skyroot Aerospace

- Function: Small-lift launch vehicle
- Manufacturer: Skyroot Aerospace
- Country of origin: India

Size
- Height: 23 m (75 ft)
- Mass: 1,000 kg (2,200 lb)

Capacity

Payload to LEO (500 km @ 45° inclination)

Payload to SSPO (500 km)
- Mass: 600 kg (1,300 lb)

Associated rockets
- Comparable: Agnibaan; Alpha; Electron; SSLV

Launch history
- Status: Under development
- Launch sites: Satish Dhawan Space Centre; SSLV Launch Complex

stage
- Maximum thrust: 1,000 kN (220,000 lb_{f})

stage
- Maximum thrust: 250 kN (56,000 lb_{f})

stage
- Maximum thrust: 100 kN (22,000 lb_{f})

Vikram-2 (Sanskrit, lit. 'Brave'; Namesake: Vikram Sarabhai, also known as Vikram-II) is an under-development Indian small-lift launch vehicle being developed by Skyroot Aerospace.

The rocket will use a cryogenic upper stage powered by the Dhawan-series rocket engine and is intended for launching small satellites into low Earth orbit (LEO) and Sun-synchronous orbit (SSO).

== Development ==
Vikram-II was announced by Skyroot Aerospace as part of its family of orbital launch vehicles following the successful suborbital launch of Vikram-S in November 2022.

The vehicle is being designed as a heavier variant of the Vikram launch family and is expected to feature multi-orbit deployment capability. In September 2020, Skyroot unveiled the Dhawan-1 cryogenic engine, intended to power heavier launch systems such as Vikram-2. In November 2021, the company successfully test-fired the Dhawan-1 engine using liquefied natural gas (LNG) and liquid oxygen (LOX), describing it as a technology demonstrator for the Vikram-2 upper stage.

Skyroot later conducted endurance tests of upgraded cryogenic engine variants, including fully 3D-printed configurations for future launch vehicles.

== Design ==
According to Skyroot Aerospace, Vikram-2 is planned to use carbon-composite structures and 3D-printed propulsion technologies. The company states that the launcher is intended to provide dedicated and rideshare launch services for small satellites.

Skyroot Aerospace has stated that Vikram-2 is designed to carry up to 900 kilograms to LEO and up to 600 kilograms to SSO.

== See also ==
- Skyroot Aerospace
- Vikram-S
- Vikram-1
- Private spaceflight
- List of Vikram launches
