= Vikram-1 =

Indian small-lift launch vehicle developed by Skyroot Aerospace

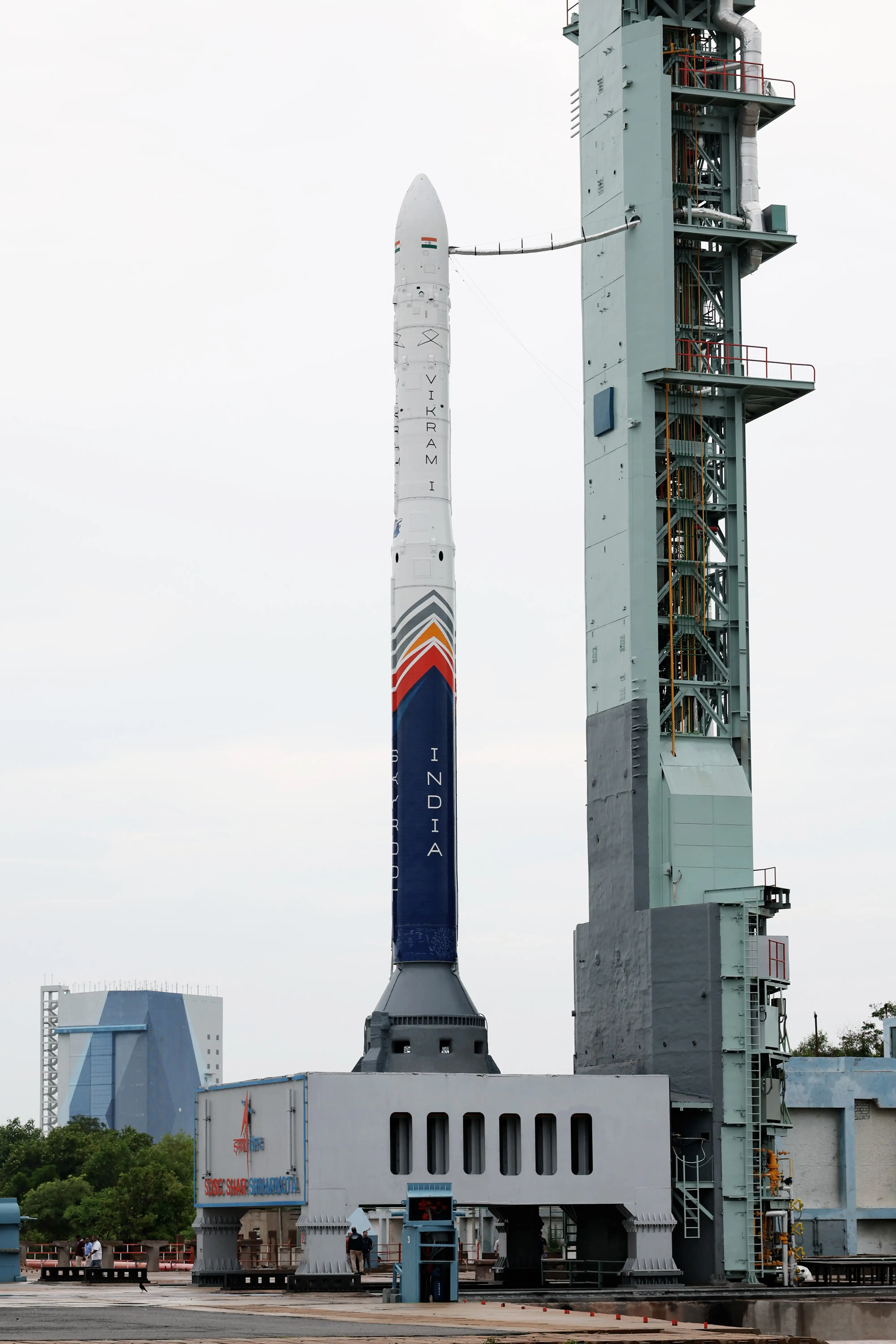
- Vikram-1 on the First Launch Pad at SDSC SHAR
- Function: Small-lift launch vehicle
- Manufacturer: Skyroot Aerospace
- Country of origin: India
- Project cost: US$70 million
- Cost per launch: US$3.5 million

Size
- Height: 24 m (79 ft)
- Diameter: 1.7 m (5 ft 7 in)
- Stages: 4

Capacity

Payload to LEO
- Altitude: 500 km
- Orbital inclination: 45°
- Mass: 1: 350 kg (770 lb); 1U: 550 kg (1,210 lb)

Payload to SSPO
- Altitude: 500 km
- Mass: 260 kg (570 lb)

Associated rockets
- Comparable: Agnibaan; Alpha; Electron; SSLV

Launch history
- Status: Active
- Launch sites: Satish Dhawan Space Centre; SSLV Launch Complex
- Total launches: 1
- Success(es): 1
- First flight: 18 July 2026

First stage
- Diameter: 1.7 m (5 ft 7 in)
- Powered by: Kalam-1200
- Maximum thrust: 1,000 kN (220,000 lb_{f})
- Propellant: Solid

Second stage
- Diameter: 1.5 m (4 ft 11 in)
- Powered by: Kalam-250
- Maximum thrust: 250 kN (56,000 lb_{f})
- Propellant: Solid

Third stage
- Diameter: 1.5 m (4 ft 11 in)
- Powered by: Kalam-100
- Maximum thrust: 100 kN (22,000 lb_{f})
- Propellant: Solid

Fourth stage
- Diameter: 1.5 m (4 ft 11 in)
- Powered by: 4 x Raman-1, 1 x Raman-2, & 4 x Raman Mini
- Maximum thrust: 5.26 kN (1,180 lb_{f})
- Propellant: N2O4/MMH

Vikram-1 (Sanskrit, lit. 'Brave', also known as Vikram-I) is a four-stage, expendable orbital small-lift launch vehicle developed by Skyroot Aerospace. Its first three stages are solid stages, while the fourth stage is a liquid stage, powered by hypergolic propellant.

The first flight, known as Aagaman, flew on 18 July 2026. The launch was a success, making India the third country with a private orbital launch capability, after the U.S. and China.

== Development ==
Schematic representation of Vikram-1

Skyroot Aerospace unveiled the Vikram-1 launch vehicle in October 2023 at its MAX-Q headquarters in Hyderabad. The rocket is named after Vikram Sarabhai, often described as the father of the Indian space program. The company stated that the rocket was developed to serve the growing global small satellite launch market.

The vehicle's development followed the successful launch of the suborbital demonstrator Vikram-S in November 2022, which made Skyroot the first Indian private company to launch a rocket from ISRO's launch facilities.

In May 2022, Skyroot completed a full-duration static test of the Kalam-100 solid rocket stage, a component of Vikram-1. Additional qualification tests, including stage separation tests and avionics validation, were carried out through 2024 and 2025.

In November 2025, Prime Minister Narendra Modi unveiled the flight-ready configuration of Vikram-1 during the inauguration of Skyroot's Infinity Campus in Hyderabad.

== Design ==
Vikram-1 is a four-stage orbital launch vehicle approximately 20 metres (65 ft 7 in) tall and 1.7 metres (5 ft 7 in) in diameter. The first three stages use solid propulsion, while the upper kick stage uses liquid propulsion for orbital insertion and adjustment manoeuvres. The rocket incorporates carbon-composite airframes intended to reduce structural mass. Skyroot has also stated that the vehicle uses 3D-printed liquid engines and modular avionics systems.

The Kalam-250 has thrust vector control for steering. The OAM (Orbital Adjustment Module) upper stage features RCS thrusters for attitude control. Skyroot advertises Vikram-1 as a responsive launch system capable of rapid integration and launch operations with minimal launch infrastructure requirements. It is capable of conducting dedicated launches or rideshare missions.

== Pricing ==
In an interview to Republic World on 31 August, the CFO of the company revealed the pricing of Vikram-1 roughly within US$3.5 million, claiming to be the most economical rocket built in the world, comparing with other peer launch vehicles in the world around US$10 million to US$12 million. The CFO also mentioned Rocket Lab's cost per launch achieving US$6 million to US$7 million after 100 successful launches. Projecting company's advantage at first launch, pricing around the half of Electron's current cost.

== Launch history ==
The inaugural flight of this launch vehicle was the Aagaman (Sanskrit, 'Arrival') mission on 18 July 2026, which successfully launched miniaturized satellites into low Earth orbit. Skyroot described Aagaman as a test flight and stated that it planned to conduct additional test flights before beginning routine commercial launches. The mission's payload was injected into orbit approximately 15 minutes after liftoff.

Date / time (UTC)	Rocket (configuration)	Launch site	Payload	Orbit	Status
18 July 2026; 06:35:30	Vikram-1	Satish Dhawan FLP	(India) SCOPE; (India) SOLARAS S3; (India) EMBRACE; Mission Aagaman; (Germany) UD3PP; (Germany) mD3RN; (India) COSMIC BLOOM; (India) MICRO ART TRIBUTE	LEO	Success
18 July 2026; 06:35:30	'Mission Aagaman', the maiden flight of Vikram-1. Cosmoserve Space's robotic arm Embrace and an on-orbit demonstration from German company DCUBED were hosted on the upper stage of the mission. The rocket successfully reached orbit on its first attempt.				
Q1 2027	Vikram-1	Satish Dhawan	(United States) Reflect Orbital	LEO	Planned
Q1 2027	Vikram-1U	Satish Dhawan	(United States) Reflect Orbital	LEO	Planned
Q1 2027	Two launch orders from Reflect Orbital. First launch will be Vikram-1, second will be Vikram-1U. Maiden flight of Vikram-1U configuration of Vikram-1 with additional solid rocket boosters. Flight will have a dedicated payload from US-based Reflect orbital.				
TBA	Vikram-1	Satish Dhawan	(Germany) Exolaunch (India) HEX20 (Italy) OhmSpace	LEO	Planned
TBA	Skyroot partnered with Germany's Exolaunch, India's HEX20 and Italy's OhmSpace for Vikram-1's second orbital test flight. The mission will carry two CubeSats, including NILA III, which will test electric propulsion technology.				

== See also ==
- Vikram-2
- SSLV
- Agnibaan
- Space industry of India
- List of Vikram launches
