= List of private spaceflight companies =

Private spaceflight companies include non-governmental or privately owned entities focused on developing and/or offering equipment and services geared towards spaceflight, both robotic and human. This list includes both inactive and active entities.

List of abbreviations used in this article
LEO: Low Earth orbit

GTO: Geostationary transfer orbit

HCO: Heliocentric orbit

VTOL: Vertical take-off and landing

SSTO: Single-stage-to-orbit

TSTO: Two-stage-to-orbit

SSTSO: Single-stage-to-sub-orbit

== Commercial astronauts ==
- Association of Spaceflight Professionals — Astronaut training, applied research and development, payload testing and integration, mission planning and operations support (Christopher Altman, Soyeon Yi)

== Manufacturers of space vehicles ==
=== Cargo transport vehicles ===
Company name	Spacecraft	Launch system	Length (m)	Dry mass (kg)	Launch mass (kg)	Payload (kg)	Payload volume (m^{3})	Return payload (kg)	Diameter (m)	Generated power (W)	Automated docking	Status
SpaceX	Dragon	Falcon 9 Block 5	6.1	4,200	10,200	6,000 pressurized or unpressurized, in any mixture	10.0 (pressurized), plus 14 (unpressurized), or 34 (unpressurized with extended trunk)	3,000 capsule return	3.7	2,000	No	Retired (21/22)
SpaceX	Dragon 2	Falcon 9 Block 5	8.1	6,400		6,000	10.0 (pressurized), plus 14 (unpressurized)	3,000	3.7		Yes	Operational (12/12)
SpaceX	Starship (spacecraft)	Super Heavy	52.1	-	-	-	-	-	9	-	-	Testing
Orbital	Cygnus (standard)	Antares 110	5.14	1,500		2,000	18.9	None	3.07	3,500	No	Retired (3/4)
Northrop Grumman Innovation Systems	Cygnus (enhanced)	Antares 230 Atlas V 401 Falcon 9 Block 5	6.34	1,800		3,500	27	None	3.07		No	Operational (16/16)
Sierra Space	Dream Chaser Cargo System	Atlas V Vulcan	16.8			5,000 pressurized, 500 unpressurized		1,750			Yes	Development (planned 2025, missed)
The Exploration Company	Nyx	Multiple				4,000 - 5,000	~8	3,000			Yes	Development
Inversion Space	Arc	Multiple (rideshare)				small payloads					No	Development
Atmos Space Cargo	Phoenix 1	Falcon 9			250	100					No	Retired (1/1)
Atmos Space Cargo	Phoenix 2	Multiple				100				50 (mean), 100 (peak)	No	Development (planned 2026)
Mitsubishi Heavy Industries	HTV-X	H3-24L	8.0		16,000	4,070 pressurised, 1,750 unpressurised	78	None	4.4	3,000 (3 kW)	No	Operational (1/1)
Rocket Factory Augsburg	Redshift	RFA One				1,300 (SSO)		None			No	Development
HyImpulse	Hymove	SL1				400		None			No	Development
Impulse Space	Mira	Falcon 9				300	~1	None		350	No	Operational (3/3)
Impulse Space	Helios	Multiple				4,000 - 5,500	6.5 m tall x 4.5 m diameter	None			No	Development
AVIC (Chengdu Aircraft Design Institute)	Haolong	Zhuque-3	10			1,800			8 (wingspan)		Yes	Development
CAS Space	Qingzhou	Kinetica-2 (Lijian-2)	5		4,200	1,800–2,750	9 (cargo bay; 27 pressurized)	None	3.3		Yes	Testing (1/1)
Gravitics	Diamondback	TBD					5–12	None			No	Development
Gravitics	Medusa	TBD						None			No	Development
Gravitics	Viper OTX	TBD						None			No	Development

=== Crew transport vehicles ===
==== Orbital ====
Company name	Spacecraft	Range	Launch system	Crew size	Length (m)	Diameter (m)	Launch mass (kg)	Power system	First spaceflight*	Status
Blue Origin	Biconic Space Vehicle	LEO	New Glenn						Planned date not known	Development
Boeing	CST-100 Starliner	LEO	Multiple, initially Atlas V	7	5.03	4.56	13,000	Solar panels	Crewed: 5 June 2024 (Uncrewed: 20 December 2019)	Operational
Sierra Space	Dream Chaser Space System	LEO	Multiple, initially Vulcan Centaur	7	9		11,300		2026	Development
SpaceX	Dragon 2	LEO	Falcon 9 Block 5	7	8.1	3.7	up to 6,000	Solar	Crewed: May 30, 2020 (Uncrewed: 2 March 2019)	Operational (18/18)
SpaceX	Starship	Mars	Super Heavy		50	9	1,335,000	Solar panels	Planned: First Crewed: 2027 (First Uncrewed: 20 April 2023)	Testing (6/11)

* - Format: Crewed (Uncrewed), includes failures

==== Suborbital ====
Company name	Spacecraft	Range	Launch system	Crew size	Length (m)	Diameter (m)	Launch mass (kg)	First spaceflight*	Status
Scaled Composites	SpaceShipOne	100 km (62 mi)	White Knight	1	8.53	8.05	3,600	21 June 2004	Retired (3/3)
Blue Origin	New Shepard Crew Capsule	114 km (71 mi) (capsule, using the launch escape system motor)	New Shepard	6		3.6		Crewed: July 20, 2021 (Uncrewed: April 29, 2015)	Operational (23/24)
The Spaceship Company	SpaceShipTwo	110 km (68 mi)	White Knight Two	8 (6 passengers, 2 pilots)	18.3	8.3	9,740	13 December 2018	Testing (10/11)
Copenhagen Suborbitals	Tycho Deep Space	105 km (65 mi)	Spica	1	13	0.955	4,000		Development
PD AeroSpace	(Unknown)	110 km (68 mi)	(Unknown)	8 (6 passengers, 2 pilots)	14.8		>6,000		Development
World View	Explorer Capsule	30 km (19 mi)	Stratospheric Balloon	10 (8 passengers, 1 pilot, 1 concierge)		5.5	4,500	Planned 2024	Development
Space Perspective	Spaceship Neptune	30 km (19 mi)	Stratospheric Balloon					First uncrewed flight: 15 September 2024	Development
Halo Space	Aurora	40 km (24 mi)	Stratospheric Balloon					First uncrewed flight: December 2022	Development

* - Format: Crewed (Uncrewed), includes failures

=== Launch vehicle manufacturers ===
Company name	Launcher name	Launcher type	No. of stages	Maximum reach	Launcher status	Maiden flight	Ref
ABL Space Systems	RS1	Light rocket	2	LEO	Retired (0/1)	10 January 2023	
AgniKul Cosmos	Agnibaan	Light rocket	2	LEO	Development	Unknown	
ARCA Space	Haas 2b	Suborbital crewed rocket	1	Suborbital	Cancelled	—	
ARCA Space	Haas 2CA	Light rocket	1	LEO	Cancelled	—	
ARCA Space	Super Haas	Medium rocket	2	LEO	Cancelled	—	
ARCA Space	EcoRocket Demonstrator	Reusable light rocket	3	LEO	Development	Unknown (2022 planned, missed)	
ARCA Space	EcoRocket Heavy	Heavy rocket	3	Deep space	Proposed	Unknown	
Arianespace	Ariane 1	Medium rocket	3	LEO	Retired (9/11)	1979	
Arianespace	Ariane 2	Medium rocket	3	LEO	Retired (5/6)	1986	
Arianespace	Ariane 3	Medium rocket	3	LEO	Retired (10/11)	1984	
Arianespace	Ariane 4	Medium rocket	3	LEO	Retired (113/116)	1988	
Arianespace	Ariane 5	Heavy rocket	2	LEO	Operational (112/117)	1996	
Arianespace	Ariane 6	Heavy rocket	2	LEO	Operational (5/6)	2024	
Arianespace	Ariane Next	Partially reusable heavy rocket	2	LEO	Development	2030s	
Australian Space Research Institute	AUSROC Nano	Light rocket	2	LEO	Cancelled	—	
Astra Space	Astra Rocket 1	Sounding rocket	2	Suborbital	Retired (0/1)	2018	
Astra Space	Astra Rocket 2	Sounding rocket	2	Suborbital	Retired (0/1)	2018	
Astra Space	Astra Rocket 3	Light rocket	2	LEO	Retired (2/5)	2020	
Astra Space	Astra Rocket 4	Light rocket	2	LEO	Development	2026 (planned)	
Astra Space	SALVO	Light rocket	2	LEO	Cancelled	—	
Blue Origin	New Shepard	Reusable suborbital rocket	1	Suborbital	Operational (22/23)	2015	
Blue Origin	New Glenn	Reusable heavy rocket	2 or 3	GTO	Operational (1/1)	2025	
Blue Origin	New Armstrong	Reusable super-heavy rocket	3	HCO	Proposed	~2030 (proposed)	
BluShift Aerospace	Stardust	Reusable sounding rocket	1	Suborbital	Operational (1/1)	2020	
BluShift Aerospace	Starless Rogue	Sounding rocket	2	Suborbital	Cancelled	—	
BluShift Aerospace	Brown Dwarf	Sounding rocket	2 or 3	Suborbital	Cancelled	—	
BluShift Aerospace	Red Dwarf	Light rocket	3	LEO	Cancelled	— (2024 planned, missed)	
Borneo SubOrbitals	TBA	Sounding rocket	2 or 3	Suborbital	Cancelled	— (2022 planned, missed)	
Canadian Arrow	Canadian Arrow	Suborbital crewed rocket	2	Suborbital	Cancelled	—	
Dawn Aerospace	Mk-II Aurora	Reusable spaceplane	1	Suborbital	Test flights (3/3)	2023	
Evolution Space	Gold Chain Cowboy	Sounding rocket	1	Suborbital	Development	2023	
Exos Aerospace	SARGE	Reusable sounding rocket	1	Suborbital	Operational (3/4)	2018	
Equatorial Space Systems	Volans	Light Rocket	3	LEO	Development	Unknown	
Equatorial Space Systems	Dorado	Sounding Rocket	1 or 2	Suborbital	Development	Unknown (2023 planned, missed)	
Equatorial Space Systems	LAD	Sounding Rocket	1	Suborbital	Retired (1/1)	2020	
Firefly Aerospace	Firefly Alpha	Light rocket	2	LEO	Operational (4/5)	2021	
Firefly Aerospace	Firefly MLV	Light rocket	2	LEO	Development	2026 (planned)	
Galactic Energy	Ceres-1	Light Rocket	4	LEO	Operational (23/24)	2020	
Galactic Energy	Ceres-2	Light Rocket	4	LEO	Testing (0/1)	2026	
Galactic Energy	Pallas-1	Partially reusable medium rocket	2	SSO	Development	2026 (planned)	
Galactic Energy	Pallas-2	Reusable super-heavy rocket	Unknown	Unknown	Development	Unknown	
Gilmour Space Technologies	RASTA	Sounding rocket	1	Suborbital	Retired (1/1)	2016	
Gilmour Space Technologies	Eris	Light rocket	3	LEO	Testing (0/1)	July 2025	
Generation Orbit	X-60A (GOLauncher 1)	Air-launched sounding rocket	1 + airplane	Suborbital	Development	Unknown	
Generation Orbit	GOLauncher 2	Air-launch-to-orbit	2 + airplane	LEO	Development	Unknown	
Independence-X Aerospace	DNLV (Dedicated Nano Launch Vehicle)	Light rocket	2	LEO	Development	2023 (planned, missed)	
Interorbital Systems	NEPTUNE N series	Light rocket	3–4	LEO	Development	Unknown	
Interorbital Systems	NEPTUNE N36	Light rocket	4	TLI	Proposed	Unknown	
Interorbital Systems	Neptune TSAAHTO	Medium rocket	2½	TLI	Proposed	Unknown	
Interstellar Technologies	Momo	Sounding rocket	1	Suborbital	Operational (3/7)	2017	
Interstellar Technologies	ZERO	Light rocket	2	LEO	Development	Unknown	
Interstellar Technologies	DECA	Reusable Medium rocket	1-2	SSO	Proposed	Unknown	
Isar Aerospace	Spectrum	Light rocket	2	LEO	Testing (0/1)	2025	
Lockheed Martin	VentureStar	Reusable spaceplane	1	LEO	Cancelled	—	
Lockheed Martin	Athena	Medium rocket	2 or 3	TLI	Retired (5/7)	1995	
OneSpace	OS-X	Sounding rocket	2	Suborbital	Operational (2/2)	2018	
OneSpace	OS-M1	Light rocket	3	LEO	Operational (0/1)	2019	
OneSpace	OS-M2	Light rocket	3 + 2 boosters	LEO	Development	Unknown	
OneSpace	OS-M4	Light rocket	3 + 4 boosters	LEO	Development	Unknown	
Orbex	Prime	Light rocket	2	LEO	Cancelled	—	
OrbitX	Haribon SLS-1	Light rocket	2	LEO	Cancelled	— (2023–2024 planned, missed)	
Northrop Grumman Innovation Systems	Antares	Medium rocket	3	LEO	Retired (17/18)	2013	
Northrop Grumman Innovation Systems	Minotaur-C, formerly Taurus	Light rocket	4	LEO	Retired (7/10)	1994	
Northrop Grumman Innovation Systems	Pegasus	Air-launch-to-orbit	3-4 + airplane	HEO	Retired (40/45)	1990	
Northrop Grumman Innovation Systems	Omega	Medium rocket	3 + 0-6 boosters	GEO	Cancelled	(planned 2021, missed)	
Orbital Transport & Raketen AG	OTRAG	Medium rocket	Variable	LEO (designed) Suborbital (achieved)	Retired (15/18)	1977	
Perigee Aerospace	Blue Whale 1	Light rocket	2	LEO	Development	2025	
PLD Space	Miura 1	Sounding rocket	1	Suborbital	Operational (1/1)	6 October 2023	
PLD Space	Miura 5	Light rocket	3	LEO	Development	2026 (planned)	
PLD Space	Miura Next	Reusable light rocket	2	LEO	Development	Unknown	
Relativity Space	Terran 1	Light rocket	2	LEO	Retired (0/1)	23 March 2023	
Relativity Space	Terran R	Reusable heavy rocket	2	Deep space	Development	2026 (planned)	
Rocket Lab	Ātea-1	Sounding rocket	2	Suborbital	Retired (1/1)	2009	
Rocket Lab	Ātea-2	Sounding rocket	2	Suborbital	Cancelled	—	
Rocket Lab	Electron	Reusable light rocket	2	TLI	Operational (34/37)	2017	
Rocket Lab	Neutron	Reusable medium rocket	2	GTO	Development	2026 (planned)	
Rocket Factory Augsburg	RFA One	Light rocket	3	LEO	Development	2026 (planned)	
Skyroot Aerospace	Vikram-S	Sounding rocket	1	Suborbital	Operational (1/1)	2022	
Skyroot Aerospace	Vikram-1	Light rocket	4	LEO	Operational (1/1)	2026	
Skyroot Aerospace	Vikram-2	Light rocket	3	LEO	Development	2027 (planned)	
Skyrora	Skyrora 1	Sounding rocket	1	Suborbital	Development	Unknown	
Skyrora	Skylark Micro	Sounding rocket	2	Suborbital	Operational (1/1)	2021	
Skyrora	Skylark L	Sounding rocket	1	Suborbital	Development	2022 (planned, missed)	
Skyrora	Skyrora XL	Light rocket	3	LEO	Development	2023 (planned, missed)	
Space Services Inc.	Percheron	Sounding rocket	1	Suborbital	Cancelled	—	
Space Services Inc.	Conestoga 1620	Medium rocket	4	LEO (designed) Suborbital (achieved)	Retired (0/1)	1995	
Space Pioneer	Tiansuo-1	Vertical landing test stage	1	Suborbital	Development	Unknown	
Space Pioneer	Tianlong-1	Light rocket		LEO	Testing (0/1)	2026	
Space Pioneer	Tianlong-2	Light rocket		LEO	Operational (1/1)	2023	
Space Pioneer	Tianlong-3	Reusable light rocket		LEO	Development	2026 (planned)	
SpaceX	Falcon 1	Light rocket	2	LEO	Retired (2/5)	2006	
SpaceX	Falcon 1e	Light rocket	2	LEO	Cancelled	—	
SpaceX	Falcon 5	Medium rocket	2	GTO	Cancelled	—	
SpaceX	Falcon 9 v1.0	Medium rocket	2	GTO (designed) LEO (achieved)	Retired (5/5)	2010	
SpaceX	Falcon 9 v1.1	Medium rocket	2	HCO	Retired (14/15)	2013	
SpaceX	Falcon 9 Full Thrust Block 1–4	Reusable medium rocket / Heavy rocket (expendable)	2	TMI	Retired (36/36)	2015	
SpaceX	Falcon 9 Block 5	Reusable medium rocket / Heavy rocket (expendable)	2	TMI	Operational (645/646)	2018	
SpaceX	Falcon Heavy	Reusable heavy rocket / Super-heavy rocket (expendable)	2 + 2 boosters	Deep space (Pluto)	Operational (14/14)	2018	
SpaceX	Starship Super-Heavy	Reusable super-heavy rocket	2	Deep space	Testing (4/9)	2023	
Stoke Space	Nova	Reusable light rocket	2	LEO	Development	Unknown	
Success Rockets	Nebo 1	Ultralight rocket	1	Suborbital	Operational (1/1)	December 2021	
Success Rockets	Stalker	Ultralight rocket	2	LEO	Development	(Planned 2024, missed)	
Success Rockets	Cosmos	Ultralight rocket	2	LEO	Development	Unknown	
United Launch Alliance	Atlas V	Medium rocket	2 + 0-5 boosters	TMI	Operational (98/99)	2002	
United Launch Alliance	Delta II 6000	Medium rocket	2-3 + 9 boosters	GTO	Retired (17/17)	1989	
United Launch Alliance	Delta II 7000	Light rocket	2-3 + 3, 4 or 9 boosters	GTO	Retired (130/132)	1990	
United Launch Alliance	Delta II 7000H	Medium rocket	2-3 + 9 boosters	TMI	Retired (6/6)	2003	
United Launch Alliance	Delta IV	Medium rocket	2 + 0, 2 or 4 boosters	GTO	Retired (29/29)	2003	
United Launch Alliance	Delta IV Heavy	Heavy rocket	2 + 2 boosters	GTO	Retired (14/15)	2004	
United Launch Alliance	Vulcan	Heavy rocket	2 + 0-6 boosters	GTO	Operational (4/4)	2024	
UP Aerospace	Spaceloft/Spaceloft XL	Sounding rocket	1	Suborbital	Operational (18/19)	2006	
UP Aerospace	Spyder	Sounding rocket	2	Suborbital	Development	(Planned 2023, missed)	
Vector Launch	Vector-R	Light rocket	2	LEO	Cancelled	— (2 prototype launches in 2017)	
Vector Launch	Vector-RE1	Light rocket	2 or 3	LEO	Cancelled	—	
Vector Launch	Vector-H	Light rocket	2	LEO	Cancelled	—	
Vector Launch	Vector-HE1	Light rocket	2 or 3	LEO	Cancelled	—	
Virgin Orbit	LauncherOne	Air-launch-to-orbit	2 + airplane	LEO	Retired (4/6)	2020 (First successful attempt Jan 2021)	
Zero2infinity	Bloostar	Rockoon system (high-altitude balloon and space launcher)	3 + high-altitude balloon	LEO	Development	Unknown	
CAS Space	Lijian-1 (Kinetica-1)	Medium rocket	4	LEO	Operational (11/12)	27 July 2022	
CAS Space	Kinetica-2	Medium rocket	2	LEO	Operational (1/1)	2026	
CAS Space	Kinetica-2 Heavy	Partially reusable heavy rocket	2 + 2 boosters	LEO	Development	2028 (planned)	
CAS Space	Kinetica-3	Reusable heavy rocket		LEO	Development	Unknown	
ExPace (CASIC)	Kuaizhou-1	Light rocket	4	LEO	Retired (2/2)	2013	
ExPace (CASIC)	Kuaizhou-1A	Light rocket	4	LEO	Operational (24/28)	2017	
ExPace (CASIC)	Kuaizhou-11	Medium rocket	4	LEO	Operational (3/4)	2020	
Honda	Unknown	Reusable rocket	1	Suborbital	Testing (1/1)	2025	
HyImpulse	SR75	Sounding rocket	1	Suborbital	Operational (1/1)	2024	
HyImpulse	SL1	Light rocket	3	LEO	Development	2026 (planned)	
Innospace	Hanbit-Nano	Light rocket	2	LEO	Testing (0/1)	2025	
Innospace	Hanbit-Micro	Light rocket	2	LEO	Development	Unknown	
Innospace	Hanbit-Mini	Medium rocket	3	LEO	Development	Unknown	
iSpace (Beijing Interstellar Glory Space Technology)	Hyperbola-1	Light rocket	4	LEO	Operational (4/8)	2019	
iSpace (Beijing Interstellar Glory Space Technology)	Hyperbola-2	Reusable light rocket	1–2	LEO	Cancelled	—	
iSpace (Beijing Interstellar Glory Space Technology)	Hyperbola-3	Reusable medium rocket	2	LEO	Development	2026 (planned)	
LandSpace	Zhuque-1	Light rocket	2	LEO	Retired (1/1)	2018	
LandSpace	Zhuque-2	Medium rocket	2	LEO	Operational (4/6)	2023	
LandSpace	Zhuque-3	Partially reusable medium rocket	2	LEO	Testing (1/1)	2025	
Latitude (formerly Venture Orbital Systems)	Zephyr	Light rocket	2	LEO	Development	2027 (planned)	
LinkSpace	RLV-T	Reusable suborbital test vehicle	1	Suborbital	Retired	2019	
LinkSpace	NewLine-1	Light rocket	2	LEO	Development	Unknown	
MaiaSpace	Maia	Reusable light rocket	2	LEO	Development	2027 (planned)	
Orienspace	Gravity-1	Heavy rocket	4	LEO	Operational (2/2)	2024	
Orienspace	Gravity-2	Partially reusable heavy rocket	2	LEO	Development	2026	
Orienspace	Gravity-3	Partially reusable heavy rocket	3	LEO	Development	Unknown	
Phantom Space	Daytona	Light rocket	2	LEO	Development	Unknown	
Space One	KAIROS	Light rocket	4	LEO	Testing (0/3)	2024	

=== Landers, rovers and orbiters ===
Company name	Craft name	Craft type	Craft status	First Launch	Ref
Astrobotic Technology	Griffin Lander (previously Artemis Lander)	Lunar lander	Development	2026 (planned)	
Astrobotic Technology	Peregrine Lander	Lunar lander	Retired (0/1)	2024	
Blue Origin	Blue Moon	Crewed Lunar lander	Development	2026 (planned)	
Blue Origin	Integrated Lander Vehicle	Crewed lunar lander	Paused	Unknown	
Dynetics	Dynetics HLS	Crewed Lunar lander	Cancelled	Unknown	
Euroluna	ROMIT	Lunar lander	Cancelled	—	
Firefly Aerospace	Blue Ghost	Lunar lander	Operational (1/1)	2025	
Firefly Aerospace	Elytra	Lunar Orbiter	Development	2026 (planned)	
Golden Spike Company (defunct)	unnamed	Crewed lunar lander	Cancelled		
Hakuto	Sorato	Lunar rover	Cancelled		
Hakuto	Tetris	Lunar rover	Cancelled		
Independence-X Aerospace	SQUALL (Scientific Quest Unmanned Autonomous Lunar Lander)	Lunar lander	Cancelled		
Interorbital Systems	RIPPER (Robotic InterPlanetary Prospector Excavator Retriever)	Lunar lander	Development		
Intuitive Machines	Universal Reentry Vehicle (URV)	Reusable orbital vehicle	Development		
Intuitive Machines	IM-1 (Odysseus)	Lunar lander	Operational (1/1)	2024	
Intuitive Machines	IM-2 (Athena)	Lunar lander	Retired (0/1)	2025	
Intuitive Machines	IM-3	Lunar lander	Development		
Intuitive Machines	IM-4	Lunar lander	Development		
Intuitive Machines	IM-5	Lunar lander (Nova-D cargo class)	Development		
Lunar Mission One	unnamed	Lunar lander	Cancelled		
Lunar Outpost	MAPP rover	Lunar rover	Lost		
Masten Space Systems	XEUS	Lunar lander	Cancelled		
Masten Space Systems	XL-1	Lunar lander	Cancelled		
Moon Express	MX-1	Lunar lander	Cancelled		
Odyssey Moon	MoonOne (M-1)	Lunar rover	Cancelled		
OrbitBeyond	Z-01	Lunar lander and rover	Cancelled		
PTScientists	Audi Lunar quattro	Lunar rover	Cancelled		
PTScientists	ALINA (Autonomous Landing and Navigation Module)	Lunar lander	Cancelled		
Puli Space Technologies	Puli	Lunar rover	Cancelled		
Relativity Space	Mars science orbiter (carrying NASA's Aeolus instrument suite)	Mars orbiter	Development	2028 (planned)	
SpaceX	Starship	Crewed mars lander	Development		
SpaceX	Starship HLS	Crewed lunar lander	Development		
Team FREDNET	Picorover	Lunar rover	Cancelled		
Team Indus	HHK-1	Lunar lander	Cancelled		
Team Indus	ECA	Lunar rover	Cancelled		
TransOrbital	TrailBlazer	Lunar orbiter	Cancelled		
Synergy Moon	Tesla	Lunar rover	Cancelled		
Blue Canyon Technologies	Various smallsat buses (Draper farside relay sats; multiple NASA science smallsats)	Lunar orbiter	Operational		
Ceres Robotics	(lunar lander)	Lunar lander	Proposed		
Draper	CP-12 / SERIES-2 (using ispace APEX 1.0 lander)	Lunar lander	Development	2026 (planned)	
Dymon	YAOKI	Lunar rover	Development		
Interlune	He-3 harvester / lander	Lunar lander	Development		
Intuitive Machines	Moon RACER (with Boeing, Northrop Grumman, AVL, Michelin)	Lunar rover	Cancelled		
ispace	Hakuto-R Mission 1	Lunar lander	Retired (0/1)	2022	
ispace	RESILIENCE	Lunar lander	Retired (0/1)	2025	
ispace	Tenacious	Lunar rover	Operational (0/1)	2025	
ispace EU (with SSTL and Airbus)	Lunar Pathfinder	Lunar lander	Development	2026 (planned)	
ispace U.S.	APEX 1.0	Lunar lander	Development	2026 (planned)	
Lunar Outpost	Eagle / Lunar Dawn LTV (with Lockheed Martin, GM, Goodyear, MDA Space)	Lunar rover	Development		
Mitsubishi Heavy Industries	LUPEX rover (with ISRO Chandrayaan-class lander)	Lunar rover	Development		
Quantum Space	Ranger / Sentry	Lunar lander	Development		
Rocket Lab	Photon (CAPSTONE bus)	Lunar orbiter	Operational	2022	
Rocket Lab	ESCAPADE (twin Mars orbiters, Photon bus)	Mars orbiter	Development		
Rocket Lab	Aspera	UV astronomy spacecraft (LEO)	Development		
Toyota	Lunar Cruiser	Crewed lunar rover	Development	2029 (planned)	
Astrobotic Technology	CubeRover (CubeRover-1 and modular product line)	Lunar rover	Development	2025	
GITAI	GITAI Lunar Rover	Lunar rover	Development		

=== Research craft and tech demonstrators ===
Company name	Craft name	Craft purpose	Craft status	Ref
ARCA	Demonstrator 2b	demonstrate reusable monopropellant engine	Retired	
Armadillo Aerospace	Quad	demonstrate VTOL	Retired	
ASRI	AUSROC I	systems Testing	Retired	
ASRI	AUSROC II	payload to 10 km	Retired	
ASRI	AUSROC 2.5	systems Testing	Testing	
ASRI	AUSROC III	payload of 150 kg to 500 km	Development	
Blue Origin	Goddard	demonstrate VTOL	Retired	
Deep Blue Aerospace	Nebula-1	demonstrate VTOL	Development	
Evolution Space	Gold Chain Cowboy	systems testing, payload to 124 km	Development	
Interorbital Systems	Neutrino	systems Testing	Operational	
Interorbital Systems	Tachyon	systems Testing	Operational	
Lockheed Martin	X-33	demonstrate SSTO	Cancelled	
Masten Space Systems	XA-0.1	demonstrate VTOL	Retired	
Masten Space Systems	XA-0.1B	Lunar Lander Challenge Level 1	Retired	
Masten Space Systems	XA-0.1E	Lunar Lander Challenge Level 2, commercial precursor flights	Retired (12 flights)	
Masten Space Systems	XA-0.1E2	commercial flights	Destroyed (115 flights)	
Masten Space Systems	XA-0.1E4	commercial flights	Retired (75 flights)	
Masten Space Systems	XA-0.1E5	commercial flights	Retired	
Masten Space Systems	XL-1T	terrestrial test bed for the XL-1 lunar lander	Cancelled	
Masten Space Systems	Xeus	commercial flights	Cancelled	
McDonnell Douglas	DC-X	demonstrate VTOL	Retired (11 test flights)	
Origin Space	Yang Wang-1	space mineral resources developer	Operational	
Rotary Rocket	Roton ATV	demonstrate VTOL	Retired (3 test flights)	
Space Services Inc.	Conestoga I	systems Testing	Retired (1 test)	
SpaceX	Grasshopper	demonstrate VTOL	Retired (8 tests)	
SpaceX	F9R Dev1	refine VTOL (low altitude)	Destroyed (5 flights)	
SpaceX	F9R Dev2	refine VTOL (high altitude)	Cancelled	
SpaceX	Starhopper	demonstrate VTOL	Retired (4 test flights)	
SpaceX	Starship prototypes	demonstrate VTOL	Retired (7 test flight)	
Swedish Space Corp.	Maxus	payload to 700 km	Operational	
Swedish Space Corp.	Maser	payload to 300 km	Operational	
UP Aerospace	SpaceLoft XL	payload to 140 km	Operational	
World View Enterprises	Stratollite	payload up to 30 km and 300 kg	Operational	
zero2infinity	nanobloon 1.0	payload to 32 km	Operational	
zero2infinity	nanobloon 2.0	payload to 33 km	Operational	
zero2infinity	microbloon 1.0	payload to 24 km	Operational	
zero2infinity	microbloon 2.0	payload to 31 km	Operational	
zero2infinity	microbloon 3.0	payload to 27 km	Operational	
Stratolaunch	Roc (carrier aircraft)	air-launch carrier platform	Operational (24+)	
Stratolaunch	Talon-A2	demonstrate reusable hypersonic flight (Mach 5+) with runway recovery	Operational (2/2)	
Stoke Space	Hopper2	demonstrate VTVL with active regeneratively-cooled heat shield and differential-throttle thrust vector control	Retired (1/1)	

== Propulsion manufacturers ==
Company name	Engine	Engine type	Applications	Status	Ref
Ad Astra Rocket Company	VASIMR	plasma propulsion	space tug/orbital transfer vehicle	Development	
ARCA	Executor	LOX/RP-1	IAR 111, Haas 2, Haas 2b, Super Haas	Development	
ArianeGroup	Vulcain	LH2/LOX	Ariane 5/Ariane 6 Main stage	Operational	
Blue Origin	BE-3	LH2/LOX	New Shepard	Operational	
Blue Origin	BE-4	LOX/CH_{4}	Vulcan, New Glenn	Operational	
Firefly Aerospace	Reaver	LOX/RP-1	Firefly Alpha first stage	Operational	
Firefly Aerospace	Miranda	LOX/RP-1	Firefly MLV first stage	Development	
Reaction Engines Ltd.	SABRE	hybrid air-breathing/chemical	Skylon	Development	
Rocket Lab	Rutherford	LOX/RP-1	Electron first stage	Operational	
Rocket Lab	Rutherford Vacuum	LOX/RP-1	Electron second stage	Operational	
Rocket Lab	Archimedes	LOX/CH_{4}	Neutron first stage	Development	
Sierra Space	VR35K-A	LH2/LOX	Upper Stage	Development	
SpaceDev	RocketMotorOne	hybrid	SpaceShipOne	Retired	
SpaceX	Kestrel	LOX/RP-1	Falcon 1 second stage	Retired	
SpaceX	Merlin	LOX/RP-1	Falcon 1, Falcon 9, Falcon Heavy first stage/boosters	Operational	
SpaceX	Merlin Vacuum	LOX/RP-1	Falcon 9 second stage, Falcon Heavy second stage	Operational	
SpaceX	Raptor	LOX/CH_{4}	SpaceX Mars transportation infrastructure, Starship, Starship HLS	Operational	
Virgin Galactic	RocketMotorTwo	hybrid	SpaceShipTwo	Operational	

== Satellite launchers ==
Company	Launch vehicles	Notes	Refs
Arianespace	Ariane, Vega	Minority owned by some EU states	
Astra Space	Rocket 3, Rocket 4	Rocket 3 retired in August 2022	
Firefly Aerospace	Firefly Alpha, Firefly MLV		
IHI Corporation	Epsilon	Some R&D by JAXA	
Mitsubishi Heavy Industries	H-IIA	R&D done by JAXA.	
Northrop Grumman Innovation Systems	Antares, Minotaur	Own launchers, funded by NASA	
Rocket Lab	Electron, Neutron		
Skyroot Aerospace	Vikram-I, Vikram-II		
SpaceX	Falcon 9, Falcon Heavy		
Sea Launch	Zenit	Cancelled (no launches since 2014; owned by S7 Airlines)	
United Launch Alliance	Atlas V, Vulcan Centaur	50% owned by Lockheed Martin, 50% Boeing	

== Space-based economy ==
=== Space manufacturing ===
Company name	Products	Manufacturing craft	Status	Ref
Shackleton Energy Company	propellant, space infrastructure, propellant depot	Unknown	Defunct (2020)	
Made In Space	3D printing in ISS, in-space antenna systems, fiber optics	Unknown	Operational (2018)	
Varda Space Industries	building products in space and bringing them back to earth (ex: ZBLAN, 3d printed organs)	Unknown	Operational (2021)	
Deep Space Industries	propellant, communications platforms, space solar power satellites	MicroGravity Foundry	Defunct (2020)	
Space Forge	in-space manufacturing (semiconductors, specialist alloys)	ForgeStar return capsule series	Development	
Redwire Space	in-space manufacturing (PIL-BOX pharma platform; ZBLAN; ceramics; bioprinting)	Various ISS-attached payloads	Operational	

=== Space mining ===
Company name	Body to be mined	Mining craft	Mining status	Ref
AstroForge	Near-Earth asteroids	Brokrr-1, Odin (formerly Brokkr-2)	Development	
Deep Space Industries	Near-Earth asteroids	Prospector-1, Harvestor 1	Defunct (2019)	
Ispace	Moon	Hakuto-R	Development	
Moon Express	Moon	MX-1, MX-2, MX-5, MX-9	Development	
Planetary Resources	Near-Earth asteroids	Arkyd Series 100, 200, 300	Cancelled	
Shackleton Energy Company	Moon	TBD	Defunct (2020)	

=== Space stations ===
Private Company name	Space Craft name	Space Craft type	Internal volume	Passenger capacity	Craft status	Orbit Around	Ref
Axiom Space	Axiom Station	Rigid module		8	Development	Earth	
Bigelow Aerospace	Genesis I subscale test spacecraft	Inflatable module	11.5 m^{3} (406 cu ft)	Uncrewed	Derelict, on orbit	Earth	
Bigelow Aerospace	Genesis II subscale test spacecraft	Inflatable module	11.5 m^{3} (406 cu ft)	Uncrewed	Derelict, on orbit	Earth	
Bigelow Aerospace	Galaxy	Inflatable module	16.7 m^{3} (590 cu ft)	Uncrewed	Cancelled	Earth	
Bigelow Aerospace	Sundancer	Inflatable module	180 m^{3} (6,357 cu ft)	3	Cancelled	Earth	
Bigelow Aerospace	BA 330	Inflatable module	330 m^{3} (11,654 cu ft)	6	Cancelled	Earth	
Bigelow Aerospace	BA 2100	Inflatable module	2,100 m^{3} (74,161 cu ft)	16	Cancelled	Earth	
Bigelow Aerospace	Space Complex Alpha	Inflatable space station	690 m^{3} (24,367 cu ft)	12	Cancelled	Earth	
Excalibur Almaz	Almaz derivative	Rigid module		3	Cancelled	Earth	
SPACEHAB Inc.	SPACEHAB Module (Single, Double, Logistics variants)	Pressurized cargo / research module (Shuttle-attached)	31 m^{3} (1,095 cu ft)–62 m^{3} (2,190 cu ft)	—	Retired (22 Shuttle missions 1993–2008)	Earth (Shuttle-attached)	
Sierra Space	Large Inflatable Fabric Environment (LIFE)	Inflatable module	300 m^{3} (10,594 cu ft)	4	Testing	Moon/Mars	
Blue Origin	Orbital Reef	Rigid module	830 m^{3} (29,311 cu ft)	TBA	Development (2021)	Earth	
Airbus	LOOP	Three-module station concept	—	TBA	Proposed	Earth	
Gravitics	Orbital Carrier	Rigid module supplier (for use across commercial stations)	—	—	Development	Earth	
Max Space	Thunderbird Station	Inflatable module	350 m^{3} (12,360 cu ft)	4	Development	Earth	
Voyager Technologies	Bishop Airlock	ISS-attached and free-flyer commercial hardware	—	Uncrewed	Operational	Earth	
Northrop Grumman	(free-flyer commercial destination)	Rigid module	—	TBA	Cancelled	Earth	
ThinkOrbital	ThinkPlatforms / Think Stations	Spherical orbital platform	—	TBA	Development	Earth	
Vast	Haven Demo	Smallsat technology demonstrator	—	Uncrewed	Operational (deployed November 2025)	Earth	
Vast	Haven-1	Rigid module	45 m^{3} (1,589 cu ft)	4	Development	Earth	
Vast	Haven-2	Modular rigid station (NASA CLD Phase 2 bid)	—	TBA	Development	Earth	
Voyager Technologies, Airbus, MDA Space, Mitsubishi Heavy Industries, Northrup Grumman	Starlab	Rigid module (single-launch)	450 m^{3} (15,892 cu ft)	4	Development	Earth	
Mitsui & Co.	Japanese Space Station Module (Mitsui) (Kibō successor)	Rigid module (designed to dock with a US commercial space station)	—	TBA	Development	Earth	

== Spacecraft component developers and manufacturers ==
Company	Products	Refs
Altius Space Machines	Rendezvous and capture technology for uncooperative satellites; magnetoshell aerocapture and aerobraking technology for CubeSats; lightweight robotic manipulators	
Andrews Space	Reusable space vehicles; HTHL spacecraft; magnetorquers	
Alén Space	NanoSats and CubeSats	
Astranis	MicroGEO Satellites	
Axelspace	CubeSats	
CesiumAstro	Active phased array communications payloads that include RF inter-satellite links as of 2017.	
EADS Astrium Satellites	Spacecraft and ground segment elements	
EADS Astrium Space Transportation	Launchers and orbital infrastructure	
Innovative Solutions In Space	CubeSat manufacture and operation, as of 2018	
Made in Space	3D printers for use in microgravityas of 2013	
Mynaric	Laser communication for satellites and aircraft	
Portal Space Systems	Satellite buses with a solar thermal propulsion system	
RUAG Space	Antenna Pointing Mechanisms; Solar Array Drive Assembly (SADA); satellite components; launchers and structures as of 2009	
SpaceDev	Small spacecraft; propulsion products and services; space components, mechanisms and structures	
SpaceQuest, Ltd.	Spacecraft and spacecraft components	
Apex Space	Production satellite buses (Aries, Comet, Nova product lines)	
Astroscale	Active debris removal and satellite life-extension services (ELSA-d demonstrator 2021; ADRAS-J close-approach to H-IIA upper stage 2024)	
Atomos Space	Orbital transfer vehicles (Quark and Gluon tugs)	
BlackSky	Earth-observation constellation (Gen-2 imaging satellites)	
ClearSpace	Active debris removal (ESA ClearSpace-1 contract; planned removal of VESPA payload adapter)	
D-Orbit	In-space transport (ION Satellite Carrier; multiple operational missions)	
ICEYE	Synthetic aperture radar (SAR) satellite constellation	
K2 Space	Large-class satellite buses (Mega-class platform)	
Loft Orbital	Hosted-payload satellite services (YAM and Longbow series)	
Pixxel	Hyperspectral satellite constellation (Firefly satellites)	
Planet Labs	Earth-observation constellation (Dove, SuperDove, SkySat, Pelican)	
SpinLaunch	Kinetic launch system (suborbital accelerator; multiple suborbital test flights completed)	
Spire Global	RF and weather smallsats (LEMUR constellation)	
True Anomaly	Defence and space-domain awareness satellites (Jackal autonomous orbital vehicle)	

== Spaceliner companies ==
Company name	Contracts for	Craft utilised	Status	Notes	Refs
Axiom Space	SpaceX	Crew Dragon	Active	SpaceX Axiom Space-1 launched in April 2022	
Benson Space Company	SpaceDev	Dream Chaser	Defunct		
MirCorp	none	Soyuz TM, Progress M1 and Mir	Defunct	Mir deorbited	
Space Adventures	-	Soyuz and the ISS	Active	9 tourists sent	
RocketShip Tours	XCOR	Lynx rocketplane	Defunct		
Virgin Galactic	Scaled Composites	Spaceship Two, White Knight 2	Active	7 Spaceship Two glide flights successfully completed	

== See also ==
- List of government space agencies
- List of private spaceflight companies in the United States
- List of spacecraft manufacturers including the "traditional space" companies
- NewSpace
- Private spaceflight
- Robert Truax
- Space industry
