= Made in Space, Inc. =

American manufacturer of 3D printers

Made In Space (now Redwire Space)
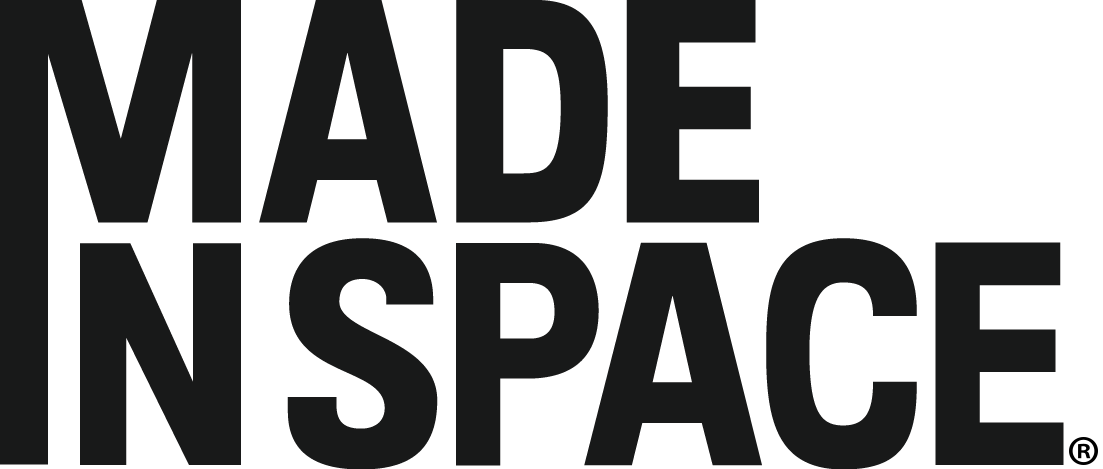
- Type: Subsidiary
- Industry: Aerospace
- Founded: August 2010
- Founder: Aaron Kemmer, Jason Dunn, Michael Snyder, Mike Chen
- Headquarters: Jacksonville, Florida, United States
- Key people: Aaron Kemmer, Jason Dunn, Michael Snyder, Andrew Rush
- Products: On-Orbit construction, Archinaut
- Number of employees: ~100 (2019)
- Parent: Redwire Space, Inc,
- Website: redwirespace.com

Made In Space, Inc. (now Redwire Space, Inc.), is an American company specializing in the engineering and manufacturing of three-dimensional printers for use in microgravity. Headquartered in Jacksonville, Florida, Made In Space's 3D printer (Zero-G printer) was the first manufacturing device used in space.

== History ==
Made In Space was founded in August 2010 by Aaron Kemmer, Jason Dunn, Mike Chen, and Michael Snyder, during that year's Singularity University Graduate Studies Program. Their primary mission is to enable humanity to become a multi-planetary species. In the spring of 2011, Made In Space created their 3D Printing Lab at the NASA Ames Research Center on Moffett Field in Mountain View, California. That summer, they were awarded a sub-orbital flight for the printer through NASA's Flight Opportunities Program. From July through September 2011, the Made In Space team performed over 400 microgravity test parabolas on NASA's reduced gravity aircraft (the "Vomit Comet"), proving their 3D printing in microgravity. With this proven concept, Made In Space was awarded a Phase 1 Small Business Innovation Research (SBIR) grant for the design of a 3D printer to be tested on the International Space Station (ISS).

In January 2013, Made In Space was awarded Phase 2 of the SBIR to build and flight-qualify an additive manufacturing facility with their 3D printer for the International Space Station (ISS). Phase 3 was awarded in February 2013 to fly their 3D printer to the ISS.

In May 2014, NASA awarded Made In Space a Phase 1 SBIR contract for the development of a recycler unit to use with the 3D printer the ISS and for their microwell project. Shortly after, Made In Space was awarded an ISS Space Flight Awareness Award. This award honors "teams that have significantly improved the efficiency, cost or capabilities of space flight".

In June 2014, Made In Space showcased their in-space manufacturing capabilities at the White House Maker Faire.

On 21 September 2014 at 1:52 a.m. EDT (05:52 UTC), Made In Space's Zero-G printer was launched from Cape Canaveral, Florida to the ISS on board SpaceX CRS-4. On 17 November 2014, astronaut Barry "Butch" Wilmore unpacked the 3D printer from its launch packaging. On 24 November 2014 at approximately 1:28 p.m. PST, Made In Space successfully printed the first part ever manufactured in space. On 11 December 2014, Made In Space's printer's first functional application was announced: a buckle developed by NASA astronaut Yvonne Cagle. This buckle is part of exercise equipment to assist with the reduction of muscle loss in zero gravity environments.

On 12 December 2014, the Cooper Hewitt, Smithsonian Design Museum re-opened after three years of renovation. Made In Space's 3D printer was one of their re-opening exhibits at the "Tools: Extending Our Reach" exhibit area. The Zero-G printer was featured along with replicas of 13 of the first 21 objects printed in space and a replica of the plate affixed to the printer, which was created by Jon Lomberg, the artist who designed Voyager's Golden Record.

On 17 December 2014, the first uplinked tool, a ratchet, was manufactured on the ISS. All of the other items previously manufactured were printed before launch, and the files were available via an SD card launched along with the printer. The ratchet files were uplinked from the Made In Space office to the ISS space station. The ratchet took four hours to print.

On 27 September 2018, the company announced an agreement with local government to open its European subsidiary in Luxembourg. Made In Space Europe will work on the development of a low-cost modular robotic arm for in-space applications.

On 17 January 2020, Florida governor Ron DeSantis announced the company's corporate headquarters would be relocating from Mountain View, California to Jacksonville, Florida. The headquarters relocation and expansion effort will involve more than US$3 million in new capital investment for Jacksonville.

Made in Space was acquired in June 2020, by Redwire (a newly formed company of the merger between Deep Space Systems and Adcole Space).

== 3D Printing in Zero-G Technology Demonstration ==
Announced in May 2013, NASA and Made In Space sent the first 3D printer to space, known as the 3D Printing in Zero-G Technology Demonstration (also known as 3D Printing in Zero-G Experiment or 3D Printing in Zero-G). The scientific objective of this experiment was to prove a 3D printer could be developed for use in zero gravity. This experiment "is the first step towards establishing an on-demand machine shop in space, a critical enabling component for deep space crewed missions and in-space manufacturing".

Integrated into a Microgravity Science Glovebox (MSG), 3D Printing in Zero-G is a proof of concept experiment. It includes printing multiple copies of planned items to test for several variables, including dimensions, layer adhesion, tensile strength, flexibility, and compressional strength. Known as "coupons", these items will be tested by the American Society for Testing and Materials (ASTM) and compared to duplicate items printed on Earth. The comparisons of these space and terrestrial manufactured coupons will be used to further refine 3D printing in space.

== The Jon Lomberg Golden Plate ==
Inspired by Jon Lomberg's work on the Voyager Golden Record, Lomberg worked with Made In Space to create the Golden Plate to help commemorate the first manufacturing of something in space. It is attached internally, so it is visible through the front viewing window.

== Additive Manufacturing Facility ==
In April 2016, the Additive Manufacturing Facility was installed aboard the ISS. It is designed to be accessible for use by NASA as well as other government agencies, academic institutions and businesses. It is currently capable of printing objects as large as 10 cm x 10 cm x 14 cm from three different polymers including acrylonitrile butadiene styrene (ABS), high-density polyethylene (HDPE), and a polyetherimide/polycarbonate composite (PEI-PC).

== Large structure in-space manufacturing ==
Made In Space worked with Northrop Grumman and Oceaneering International to build and demonstrate Archinaut (OSAM-2), a versatile in-space robotic precision manufacturing and assembly system. Archinaut aimed to enable in-space production and assembly of the backbone structures for large telescopes, repair, augmentation, or repurposing of existing spacecraft, and robotic assembly of new space stations. MIS performed ground testing of a central spar onto which rolled up solar arrays can be extended and locked into place. The flight demonstration, Archinaut One, was expected to be launched aboard a Falcon 9 rocket.

The company has released video demonstrations of Archinaut's robotic assembly and Robotics Development Lab, as well as animations showing Archinaut's in-space assembly and manufacture capabilities.

In 2023, the Archinaut project was concluded without proceeding to a flight demonstration.

== Fiber optics ==
The multi-flight experimental payloads are producing test quantities of ZBLAN optical fiber. Based on the results from initial experiments and market demand, Made In Space plans to develop and operate larger-scale microgravity production facilities for ZBLAN and other microgravity-enabled materials. For its fiber optics development, MIS has teamed with ThorLabs. The advantage of fiber optics produced in microgravity are much lower signal loss capabilities, which benefit long-haul communications, medical research, super-computing, and many other industries and applications.

== Other activities ==
In 2018, MIS was awarded Small Business Innovation Research award extensions of 24 months for its Vulcan and Industrial Crystallization Facility (ICF). The Vulcan Advanced Hybrid Manufacturing System is an additive and subtractive manufacturing technology being developed for in-space applications. Vulcan enables fabrication of precisely-machined metal parts at the point-of-use, such as on the International Space Station or future crewed space platforms. The ICF on the International Space Station would also manufacture space-enabled, multi-use optical crystals in microgravity. Optical crystals are used by such industries as computers and data-processing systems.

An MIS commercial recycling facility was launched to the International Space Station in late 2019. The facility takes in plastic waste and unneeded plastic parts and physically converts them into spools of feedstock for the space station additive manufacturing facility used for manufactured-in-space parts. MIS partnered with Kevin Eastman to include Shredder (Teenage Mutant Ninja Turtles) artwork integrated on the shredding mechanism inside the recycler.

== See also ==
- List of private spaceflight companies
- Varda Space Industries
- Tethers Unlimited
