= OSAM =

OSAM could refer to:

- Osam, a river in northern Bulgaria
- O'Shaughnessy Asset Management, LLC
- OSAM-1 (On-orbit, Servicing and Manufacturing 1), a cancelled NASA satellite refueling mission
- OSAM-2 or Archinaut, a cancelled NASA space manufacturing demonstration mission
