= ASRI =

ASRI may refer to:

- Alexander Shulgin Research Institute
- Australian Space Research Institute
