= Skyryse =

- Type: Private
- Industry: Technology
- Founded: 2016 in Hayward, California
- Headquarters: El Segundo, California, United States
- Key people: Mark Groden (CEO)
- Products: SkyOS, Skyryse One
- Website: www.skyryse.com

Skyryse, Inc. is an American technology company. Founded in 2016 and based in El Segundo, California, it designs hardware and software for piloting autonomous or partially-autonomous aircraft. As of 2026, Skyryse was working with both private companies and the U.S. military on integration projects. In February 2026, Skyryse's valuation was estimated at $1.15 billion.

== History ==
=== 2016-2019 ===
Skyryse was founded in 2016 by Mark Groden, who became CEO. The company, originally based in Hayward, California, began developing an aircraft automation system for passenger aircraft. In March 2017, Skyryse launched an entirely autonomous helicopter.

Emerging from stealth mode in August 2018, to prove its concept, Skyryse trialed using its modified helicopters with the city of Tracy, California. The helicopters used a radar and antenna system that provides a scan that "translates into a color-coded guide to safe flight paths over terrain." The company transported first responders to medical emergencies, including police, fire and search-and-rescue teams. Fast Company noted the piloted flights let Skyryse collect flight data to "feed machine learning AI to develop pilot assistance tools and ultimately automated flight systems," similar to the methods used by driverless carmakers. Headquarters had been moved to Los Angeles by 2019.

=== 2020-2024 ===
In March 2020, the company revealed its flight-automation system, SkyOS. In October 2021, Skyryse hired Michael Huerta, former FAA head, and Chris Hart, former chair of the NTSB, as advisors to help with its FAA certification process. On July 22, 2023, SkyOS "successfully executed the world's first fully automated autorotation emergency landing procedure," using a Robinson R66 with Skyryse technology.

As of 2024, it was headquartered in El Segundo, California, and also has a flight test center in Camarillo. It opened a new light industrial facility in El Segundo in July 2024, and in August 2024, opened a site at Hawthorne Airport.

=== 2025-2026 ===
In January 2025, Skyryse and the US Army began partnering on integrating SkyOS into military aircraft like the Black Hawk helicopter. In 2025, the Federal Aviation Administration granted design approval for SkyOS, leaving flight verification as the final approval stage to be certified for the civilian market.

Flying Magazine reported in July 2025 that CAL FIRE had partnered with Skyryrse on integrating SkyOS into its aircraft. By that summer, Skyryse was working to integrate SkyOS into aircraft like the Airbus H-125 and the Cirrus SR22. Skyryse by 2026 had "performed automated hover, lift-off and landing maneuvers" with a Black Hawk. By early 2026, company had signed contracts to integrate SkyOS on the Bell 407 and Pilatus PC-12. In February 2026, Skyryse, Inc.'s total valuation was estimated to be US$1.15 billion.

== Funding ==
In 2018, Skyryse raised US$25 million from investors such as Venrock and Stanford University. It raised an additional $13 million in 2019 from investors such as William Clay Ford Jr. and Fontinalis Partners. In 2021, it raised $200 million in a Series B funding round led by Fidelity Management & Research Company and Monashee Investment Management. Among other new investors were Raptor Group, Embedded Ventures, and Dmitry Balyasny. In February 2026, it raised $300 million in a Series C investment round from investors such as Qatar Investment Authority, bringing the total amount of equity capital raised since inception to $605 million.

== Products ==
Designed to be compatible with a large number of aircraft, the SkyOS flight system "replaces conventional mechanical controls with a simplified interface" and fly-by-wire system. It is designed to "automate the trickiest aspects of flying, enhance the skills of pilots, and improve safety."

Skyryse One is the first aircraft to be equipped with SkyOS. It has certain mechanical flight controls, like gauges and switches, replaced with flight computers, a new instrument panel, and a primary flight display.

Skyryse launched Skylar, its AI flight assistant, in October 2025.

== See also ==
- Autonomous aircraft
