= Mu Space =

mu Space and Advanced Technology
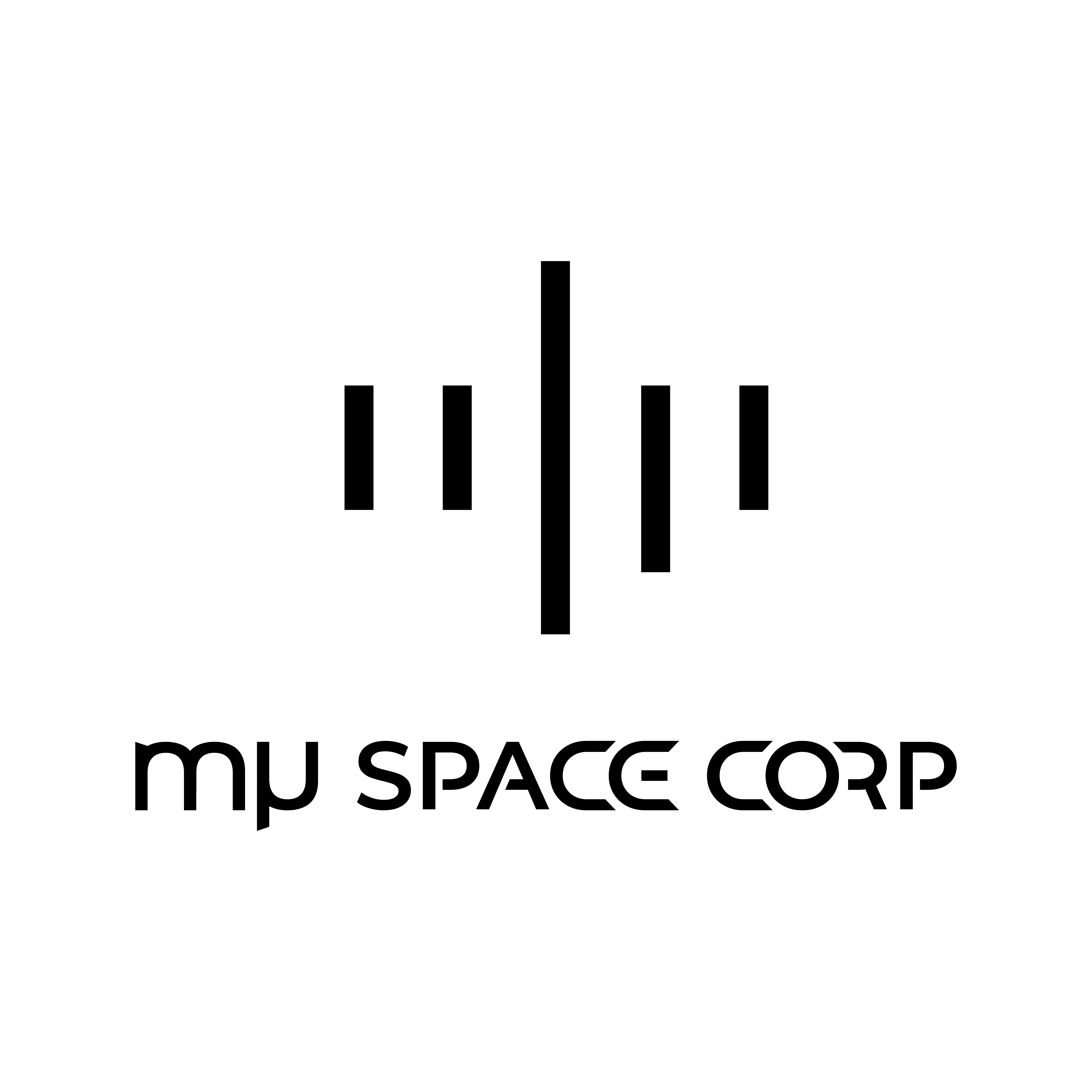
- Native name: บริษัท มิว สเปซ แอนด์ แอดวานซ์ เทคโนโลยี จำกัด
- Company type: Private
- Industry: Aerospace
- Founded: June 21, 2017; 8 years ago
- Founder: James Yenbamroong
- Headquarters: Bangkok, Thailand; 13.7780794°N 100.5433054°E
- Services: Satellite broadband, Telecommunications service, and; Space Tourism
- Number of employees: 60
- Website: www.muspacecorp.com

Mu Space and Advanced Technology Co., Ltd., operating under the name Mu Space Corp, is an aerospace manufacturer and internet service provider in Southeast Asia, founded by James Yenbamroong in June 2017.

== History ==
Mu Space Corp. signed satellite launch contracts with Blue Origin in September 2017 (using the New Glenn), and with Relativity Space in 2019 (using the Terran 1), however the latter rocket was retired before any payloads were launched. In December 2017, Thailand's National Broadcasting and Telecommunications Commission granted Mu Space Corp a 15-year license to provide satellite services in the country until 2032.

Mu Space Corp began conducting space-related research in July 2018, when micro-gravity experiments were sent into space aboard Blue Origin's New Shepard rocket. Later that year in September, the company also released 3D digital renderings of new spacesuit designs, intended to be used by astronauts and space tourists.

In May 2020, the company signed a Memorandum of Understanding (MoU) agreement with TOT Public Company Limited to cooperate in the low Earth orbit space industry and develop a geostationary satellite network to provide broadband to rural areas of Thailand. The company also had a payload on the NS-13 launch of New Shepard in October 2020. In February 2021, and again in January 2024, Mu Space signed an MoU with Airbus Defense and Space. The collaboration focuses on cooperation on potential Thailand small satellite missions, GNSS, and other earth observation missions.

== Facilities ==
In December 2020, Mu Space held a soft opening for a factory ('Factory 0') that would allow satellite and spacecraft manufacturing, robotics testing, and the development of in-space internet infrastructure.

The company began expanding its operations to a larger factory ('Factory 1') in early 2021.

In early October 2021, Mu Space unveiled its third factory ('Factory 2') which, on top of generic satellite manufacturing, focused on developing electronics and power systems for the company's satellites. The factories have similar facilities, with the main goal of each being to expand production.

== Technology ==
=== Satellite ===
The National Broadcasting and Telecommunications Communication awarded Mu Space a license to provide satellite services to Thailand until 2032. In 2018, Mu Space started to install equipment to deliver the satellite broadband service for government projects with the plan to use satellites of another company, SES.

The company's "Space IDC" (Space Internet Data Center) is a joint project between Mu Space Corp and a Thai state-owned telecommunications company and aims to provide a data center service, combined with a server, located in outer space.

Mu Space will also launch its first geostationary satellites with Blue Origin with a target date of 2021, in order to help provide space-based satellite services such as: broadband, broadcast, mobile, and satellite services to Thailand.

== Space Payload Launch ==
=== Blue Origin New Shepard Launch Vehicle ===
In mid-2020, Mu Space sent an enormous payload cooperating with TOT Public Company Limited, which incorporated a wide scope of electronic devices and sensors for the estimation. The company also coordinated with a group of scientists, biologists, young students and famous Thai artists to send anti-disciplinary experiments for studying the effect of weightlessness and the understanding of DNA Storage Preservation.

== Other Collaborations ==
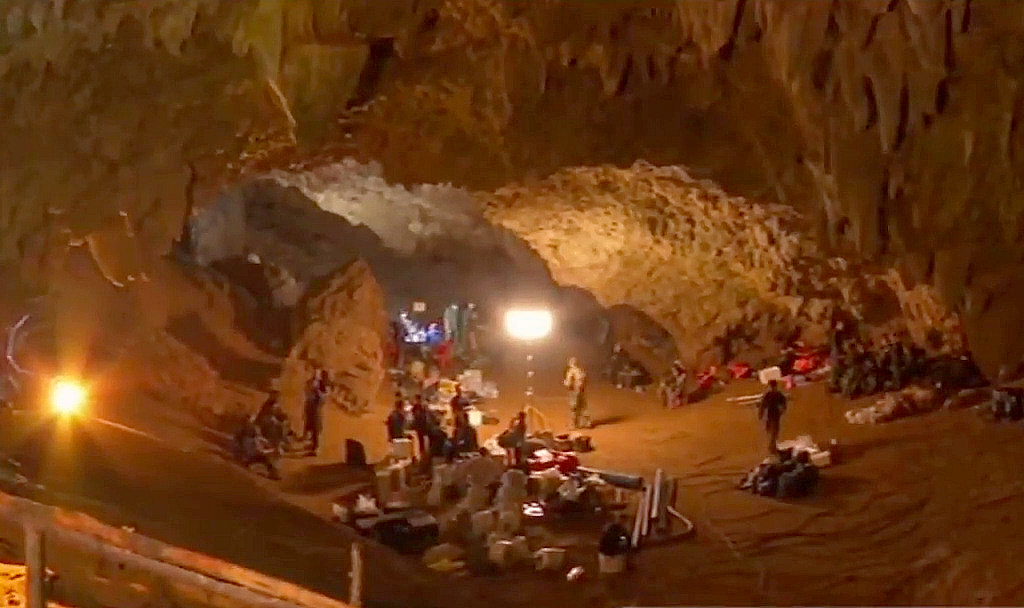
Tham Luang cave

=== Tham Luang cave rescue ===
Mu Space assembled a team of engineers to help in the rescue mission to save the 12 boys and their football coach trapped inside the Tham Luang cave in Thailand. The company collaborated with Google and Weather Decision Technologies to provide the rescuers with weather forecast models.

== See also ==
- CAT Telecom
- True Corporation
- SES S.A.
- Blue Origin
