= Relativity Space =

American launch vehicle manufacturer

Relativity Space Inc.
- Type: Private
- Industry: Aerospace manufacturing; Commercial spaceflight
- Founded: 2015; 11 years ago
- Founders: Tim Ellis; Jordan Noone
- Headquarters: Long Beach, California, US
- Key people: Eric Schmidt (CEO); Jordan Noone (advisor)
- Products: Aeon 1; Terran 1; Terran R
- Services: Orbital launch
- Number of employees: 2,000 (2026)
- Website: relativityspace.com

Relativity Space Inc. is an American aerospace manufacturing company headquartered in Long Beach, California. Relativity Space is developing launch vehicles, rocket engines, and manufacturing technologies for commercial orbital launch services. As of March 2025, Relativity has announced plans to launch its in-development launch vehicle Terran R for the first time in late 2026.

In June 2026, the company announced its Interplanetary Sciences Program, with a Mars science orbiter planned for launch in 2028.

== History ==
=== Founding and funding ===
Relativity Space was founded in 2015 by CEO Tim Ellis and CTO Jordan Noone. It was founded to develop and manufacture small-lift rockets capable of carrying satellites into orbit, before pivoting to developing medium-to-heavy lift rockets to meet market demands.

In November 2020, Relativity Space announced its US$500 million Series D funding at a calculated $2.3 billion valuation. In June 2021 Relativity announced another $650 million funding round led by Fidelity Investments at a valuation of $4.2 billion, bringing its total funding to $1.335 billion. The funding will help the development of a partially reusable heavy-lift launch vehicle, the Terran R, targeting a first orbital launch no earlier than 2026. Relativity Space has investors including Baillie Gifford, Blackrock, BOND, Coatue, Fidelity, General Catalyst, ICONIQ Capital, K5 Global, Mark Cuban, Playground Global, Social Capital, Tiger Global, Tribe Capital, and Y Combinator among others.

In March 2025, former Google CEO Eric Schmidt replaced Ellis as CEO of Relativity Space, taking a controlling interest in the company. At this point in time, the company had a contract backlog of over $2.9 billion for Terran R.

=== Development history ===
The company's initial attempt to launch its first rocket, named Terran 1, on March 8, 2023 was scrubbed due to technical issues, with a second attempt anticipated for March 11, 2023, which was also scrubbed. On March 23, 2023, Relativity launched its first Terran 1 flight, naming it "Good Luck, Have Fun" and carrying no payload. It achieved its primary mission objective to reach the area of maximum aerodynamic pressure (max-q), but experienced an anomaly during stage two burn and failed to reach orbit.

In April 2023, Relativity Space announced it would retire the smaller vehicle to concentrate on its larger, reusable Terran R launch system. The heavier‑lift, partially reusable system is capable of serving satellite constellation and commercial launch markets.

== Facilities ==
=== Headquarters ===
Relativity Space announced a new 11,000 m^{2} (120,000 sq ft) Long Beach, California headquarters and factory in February 2020. Terran 1 was manufactured at this location, which houses additive manufacturing, research and development facilities. A new 93,000-square-metre (1,000,000 sq ft) factory was announced in 2021, with Relativity taking over the former Boeing C-17 production plant in 2022 to begin production of its Terran R reusable launch vehicle.

By 2025, the Long Beach facility had become the central hub for Terran R design, manufacturing, and component testing. The facility houses testing infrastructure for the Terran R development program, such as structural test stands where primary rocket structures have undergone multi‑week static and dynamic load campaigns. The facility includes auxiliary test areas for early component verification, including cryogenic test zones and environmental test environments designed to simulate launch conditions through vibration, thermal, and pressure assessments.

=== Stennis Space Center ===
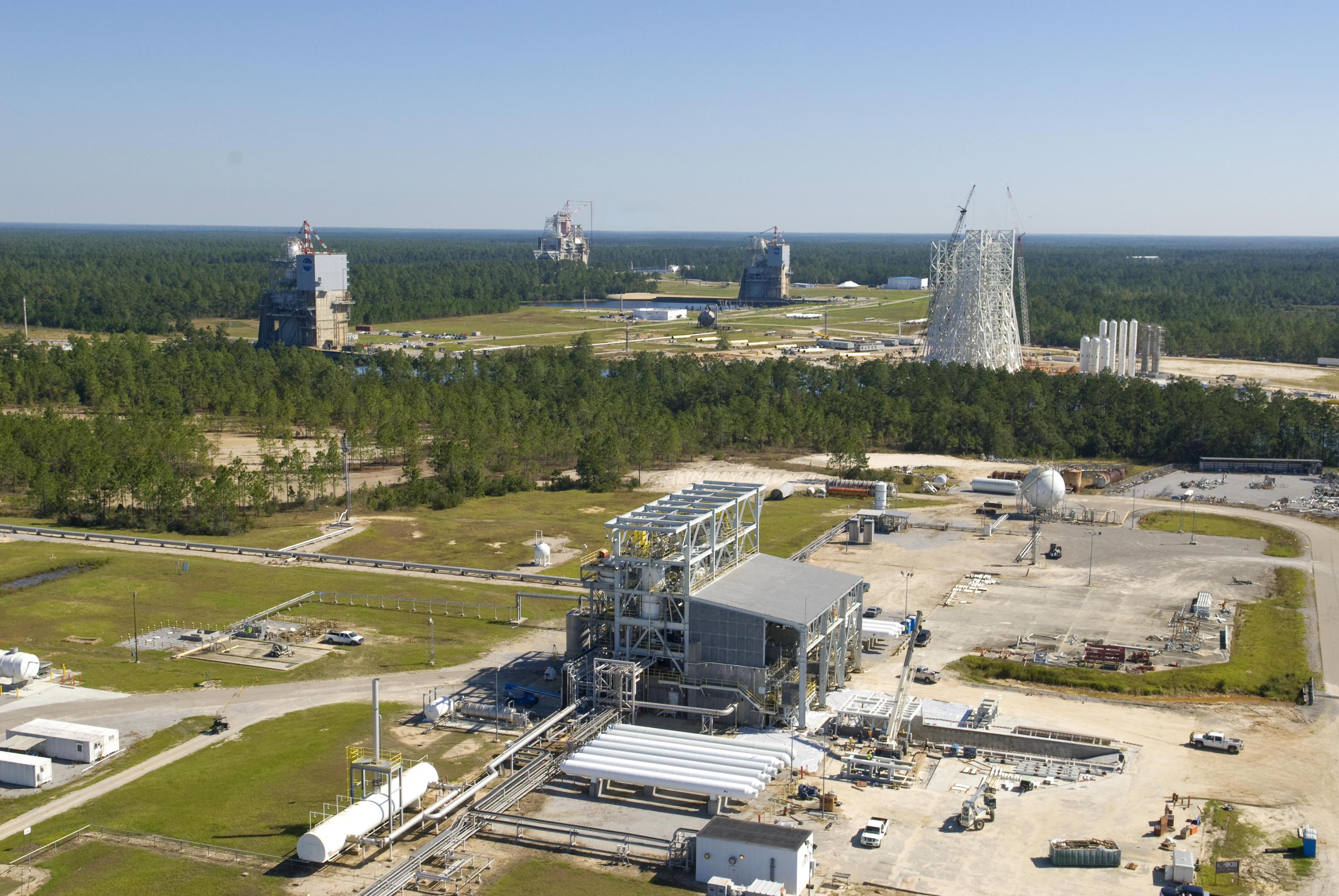
E Test Complex (foreground) at the Stennis Space Center, where Relativity conducts Aeon 1 test firings

Relativity is the largest commercial tenant of NASA's Stennis Space Center in Hancock County, Mississippi, with over 300 acres of testing infrastructure. The space center was established in the 1960s, and supported the Apollo, Space Shuttle, and Constellation programs. In recent years, the center has become a hub for commercial space companies.

In March 2018, Relativity Space signed a 20-year lease at the Stennis Space Center to test engine components and eventually full-scale test their fully integrated rocket engines. In June 2019, Relativity Space expanded their work with the Stennis Space Center to include exclusive use of 20,000 m^{2} (220,000 sq ft) within Building 9101. In mid-2019, Relativity Space planned to create 200 jobs and invest $59 million in Mississippi over the course of this nine-year lease, which carries an option to extend for another 10 years. In late 2023, the company expanded its presence at the site with an agreement to lease the A-2 test stand in order to perform vertical stage testing on Terran R. Upgrades to the stand will increase thrust capacity from its original 650,000 lb to over 3.3 million lb, enabling more powerful stage tests and accelerated test cycles.

Test Stand/Complex	Activation/Agreement	Primary Use	Programs Supported
R Complex	Construction announced 2022; second bay activated 2025	Dual-bay engine test facility enabling parallel engine tests	Terran R (Aeon R / Aeon V)
A-2 Test Stand	Lease signed September 2023	High-thrust vertical stage testing	Terran R
E-1 Test Stand (cell)	2022 agreement for test cell access	Thrust-chamber assembly and component hot fire tests	Terran R (Aeon R)
E-2 Test Complex (cells 1-2)	2019-2020 operational expansion	Engine testing and component development	Terran 1, Terran R (Aeon 1, Aeon 1, Aeon R components)
E-3 Test Stand	2016 partnership with NASA	Early development testing	Terran 1 (Aeon 1)
E-4 Test Complex	2018 exclusive-use agreement	Engine and stage testing during early development	Terran 1 (Aeon 1)

=== Cape Canaveral LC-16 ===
In January 2019, Relativity Space announced that it won a competitive bidding process with the United States Air Force to build and operate Launch Complex 16 (LC-16) at Cape Canaveral Space Force Station in Florida. LC-16 has historical significance having been previously used by the US military to launch Titan and Pershing ballistic missiles.

As of 2026, LC‑16 is undergoing significant upgrades to support Terran R, including construction of a horizontal integration facility, installation of propellant tank farms and water deluge systems, a flame diverter trench, and groundwork for additional pad support structures.

=== Vandenberg Space Force Base Building 330 ===
In 2020, Relativity Space announced plans to develop a second launch pad at Vandenberg Space Force Base in California to launch payloads into polar orbits and Sun-synchronous orbits.

== Products ==
=== Launch vehicles ===
==== Terran R ====
Terran R is a heavy-lift two-stage, partially reusable launch vehicle that is currently under development. Compared to the smaller, expendable Terran 1, it is partially constructed using the same 3D printing technologies, but has moved away from additive manufacturing for several components, such as the fuel tanks. Additionally, Relativity has utilized outside suppliers for some components, such as fuel tank domes and fairings. The Terran R is substantially larger than the Terran 1, with a maximum payload capacity of 33,500 kg (73,900 lb) to low Earth orbit when expended. When re-using the booster stage, the payload is projected to be 23,500 kg (51,800 lb) to a 200 km (120 mi) low-earth orbit and 5,500 kg (12,100 lb) to geostationary transfer orbit. This capacity represents a larger payload mass than Falcon 9, but smaller than Blue Origin's New Glenn. The first launch is expected to take place no earlier than 2026. The first stage will use 13 Aeon R gas generator cycle engines that use liquid oxygen and methane propellant. Nine of the engines are capable of gimbaling and four are fixed. The second stage will use an upgraded Aeon V engine, which is also a gas generator cycle engine using liquid oxygen and methane.

Terran R’s architecture is designed to support first‑stage reusability. Following stage separation, the booster performs a flip maneuver using cold-gas reaction control thrusters before igniting engines for an entry burn to reduce velocity and heating during atmospheric reentry. Grid fins provide aerodynamic control during descent, after which the stage performs a landing burn and deploys its landing legs prior to touchdown on a downrange recovery ship. Recovered stages are then inspected, refurbished, and prepared for subsequent flights. The vehicle’s design incorporates iterative reusability blocks, with initial flights focused on engineering validation and later configurations aimed at increasing reuse cadence.

As of early 2026, all primary structures flight hardware were in integration and engine acceptance testing was underway following engine qualification. Hardware for future flights is also being manufactured.

==== Terran 1 ====
Terran 1 was an expendable launch vehicle that consisted of two stages. The first stage used nine Aeon 1 engines, while the second stage used a single vacuum-optimized Aeon 1 engine. It was designed to launch a maximum payload of 1,250 kg (2,760 lb) to 185 km (115 mi) low Earth orbit (LEO), normal payload of 900 kg (2,000 lb) to 500 km (310 mi) Sun-synchronous orbit (SSO), and high-altitude payload of 700 kg (1,500 lb) to 1,200 km (750 mi) SSO. Relativity's advertised launch price was $12 million per Terran 1 mission in June 2020. Relativity conducted the first launch of Terran 1 on March 23, 2023 (UTC) after two scrubbed launch attempts.

The mission's primary objective was to pass through the area of maximum aerodynamic pressure (max-q), the period of flight where the rocket experiences the greatest amount of aerodynamic forces as it climbs through the atmosphere. Terran 1 passed through max-q at T+1 minute and 20 seconds. Soon after launch, an anomaly occurred with the upper stage engine which prevented the rocket from achieving orbit. The second stage engine and nosecone splashed into the ocean about 4 minutes into the flight. The Terran 1 rocket was retired after this maiden flight, as the company shifted to producing larger rockets.

=== Rocket engines ===
==== Aeon R ====
The Aeon R engine is a high pressure gas generator cycle LOX/subcooled Methane propellants engine designed to produce 269,000 lbf (1,200 kN) of thrust at sea level. 13 Aeon R engines will power the first stage of Terran R with a combined liftoff thrust of 3,497,000 lbf (15,560 kN). A second stage variant, Aeon V, will power Terran R’s second stage with 323,000 lbf (1,440 kN) in a vacuum.

A major test of the Aeon R engine took place in December 2023, when the engine ran its first mission duty cycle at partial power. In May 2024, the Aeon R engine ran a full power mission duty cycle. The engine was qualified in July 2025 and flight builds and acceptance testing is ongoing as of March 2026. To date, Aeon R engines have completed more than 300 hot fire tests. Aeon V development testing is ongoing as of February 2026.

==== Aeon 1 ====
The Aeon 1 rocket engine was designed to produce 23,000 pounds-force (100,000 N) at sea level and 25,400 pounds-force (113,000 N) in a vacuum. The engine was powered by liquid natural gas (LNG) and liquid oxygen (LOX). It is made out of a proprietary 3D-printed alloy. (GRCop ) It was printed by selective laser sintering and assembled from fewer than 100 parts. By February 2022, Relativity Space had completed 500+ test firings of its Aeon 1 engine, using the E-3 test facility at NASA's Stennis Space Center.

The vacuum-optimized version of Aeon 1, known as AeonVac, powered the second stage of Relativity's rockets.

=== Other divisions ===
The company initially developed 3D printing technologies for rocket primary structures, and continues to use 3D printing for engine components. In 2025, Relativity announced the creation of Horizon Manufacturing Technologies to develop additive manufacturing for other industrial applications. That year, Relativity also created Dark Matter Lab for deep-tech prototyping.

== Interplanetary missions ==
In June 2026, Relativity Space announced the Interplanetary Sciences Program (ISP), an initiative to develop spacecraft and technologies for planetary science missions. Its first planned mission is a Mars science orbiter targeted for launch in 2028, carrying payloads developed by Relativity and NASA.

On June 17, 2026, NASA announced a partnership under which Relativity would provide the spacecraft, launch vehicle, and mission operations, while NASA would supply the Aeolus atmospheric science instrument suite. Developed at NASA's Ames Research Center, Aeolus comprises four instruments designed to measure Martian winds, temperatures, dust, and clouds. The observations are intended to improve atmospheric models and inform planning for future robotic and crewed landings. NASA plans to support science instrument operations for at least one Martian year.

== Launch contracts ==
As of 2020, Relativity Space had pre-sold more launches than any other company in the private space industry since SpaceX.It sold launches to Telesat, Mu Space, Spaceflight Industries, Momentus Space, Iridium, and Lockheed Martin.

Relativity Space has secured multiple launch contracts for its Terran R reusable launch vehicle ahead of its planned debut. In June 2022, Relativity signed a multi‑year, multi‑launch agreement with OneWeb to deploy the second‑generation satellite constellation, marking one of the earliest confirmed Terran R customers. In October 2023, satellite operator Intelsat agreed to a multi‑launch services agreement with Relativity for Terran R missions. In November 2025 SES expanded its multi‑year, multi‑launch agreement with Relativity, adding previously unannounced Terran R missions to its portfolio. This brought the company's total commercial backlog to $2.9 billion. As of July 2026, the company has become eligible to compete for United States Space Force contracts.

== See also ==
- List of private spaceflight companies
- List of missions to Mars
- List of proposed Solar System probes
- List of extraterrestrial orbiters
- Timeline of private spaceflight
