= RocketShip Tours =

American space tourism company

- Company type: Private
- Industry: Space tourism
- Founded: 2008
- Headquarters: Arizona, USA
- Key people: Jules Klar: Chief Executive Officer Rosemary Karlin - General Manager R. J. Watters III; Director of Sales & Marketing
- Owner: Jules Klar
- Website: www.rocketshiptours.com

RocketShip Tours is an American space tourism company founded in 2008 by travel industry entrepreneur Jules Klar and which planned to provide sub-orbital human spaceflights to the paying public, in partnership with rocketplane developer XCOR Aerospace. Klar created RocketShip Tours to act as General Sales Agent for XCOR Aerospace.

Jules Klar got his start in the travel business in New York City in 1961. He founded $5-A-Day Tours in partnership with Arthur Frommer of Frommer's fame. Klar's company, Great American Travel became one of the most successful wholesale travel organizations in America through the succeeding years. The company's space tourism package included screening, training and a trip into suborbital space. Jules selected XCOR Aerospace to partner with, due to its record of reliable rocket engine development and technological approach towards suborbital space travel.

In 2012 XCOR signed Space Expedition Corporation (SXC) as their new General Sales Agent For Space Tourism Flights.

== Spacecraft ==
Designed and built by XCOR Aerospace, the Lynx rocketplane will have four liquid rocket engines at the rear of the fuselage burning a mixture of LOX-Kerosene and each of them will give between 2500-2900 lbf (11 120-12 900 N) of thrust. The Lynx is projected to carry one pilot, a ticketed passenger, and/or a payload or small satellites above 100 km altitude. The occupants would wear pressure suits made by Orbital Outfitters. The Lynx was initially announced on March 26, 2008, with plans for an operational vehicle within two years. That date has since fallen to late 2011.

Mark I Prototype Maximum Altitude: 61 km (200,000 ft) Primary Internal Payload: 120 kg (265 lbs) External Dorsal Mounted Pod: 280 kg (617 lbs) Secondary payload spaces include a small area inside the cockpit behind the pilot or outside the vehicle in two areas in the aft fuselage fairing.

Mark II Production Model Maximum Altitude: +100 km (+330,000 ft) Primary Internal Payload: 120 kg (265 lbs) External Dorsal Mounted Pod: 650 kg (1433 lbs) and is large enough to hold a two-stage carrier to launch a microsatellite or multiple nanosatellites into low Earth orbit. Secondary payload spaces include the same as the Mark I.

=== Overview ===
Suborbital flight tickets are now available ($95,000 per person with a $20,000 deposit). The initial deposit qualifies the passenger for a four-day orientation, medical screening and G-Force training at an Arizona resort. A final payment is required to take the flight aboard the Lynx rocketplane. It is expected that the spacecraft will be piloted by Richard A. Searfoss, a retired United States Air Force colonel, NASA Astronaut and current XCOR test pilot. The craft is projected to be a one-passenger, one pilot rocketplane. Its planned trajectory will overlap the Earth's atmosphere at 70,000 feet (21,000 m), which will make it a sub-orbital journey with a short period of weightlessness. The spacecraft, the Lynx rocketplane, is a Suborbital rocket-powered aircraft being developed by the California-based company XCOR Aeorospace. When operational, the vehicle will fly over 100 km (the Kármán line, a common definition of where "space" begins). The time from liftoff of the Lynx until the touchdown of the vehicle after the sub-orbital flight will be about 1.0 hour. The sub-orbital flight itself will only be a small fraction of that time. The weightlessness will last approximately 5 minutes.

== Competition ==
Besides RocketShip Tours, there are numerous other companies actively working on commercial passenger suborbital spaceflight. Additionally, there are several others developing commercial crewed orbital spaceflight capability (including some which are initially designed for, or may eventually be used for, commercial passenger spaceflight), which is a significantly more difficult problem than suborbital spaceflight. In 2013, tickets were available through the XCOR partnership with Space Expedition Corporation (SXC). Priced at $95,000, they were around half the $200,000 cost quoted by Virgin Galactic, the main competitor in the commercial sub-orbital spaceflight market.

== Base ==
Test launches are planned to take place from the Mojave Spaceport, where XCOR Aerospace is constructing the spacecraft. RocketShip Tours expects that initial passenger flights will take place there, as well.

== See also ==
- Commercial astronaut
- List of private spaceflight companies
- Space Adventures
- Space colonization
- Space tourism
- Space Tourism Society
