= Terran R =

Partially-reusable heavy-lift launch vehicle by Relativity Space

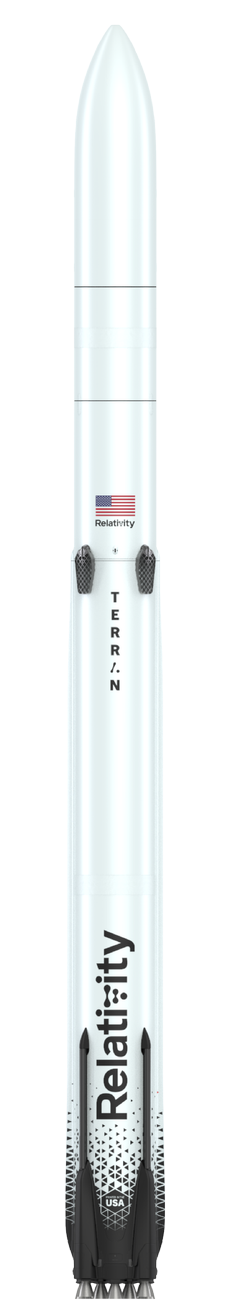
- Terran R rocket as April 2023
- Function: Reusable orbital launcher
- Manufacturer: Relativity Space
- Country of origin: United States
- Cost per launch: $55 million

Size
- Height: 87 m (284 ft)
- Diameter: 5.4 m (17.7 ft)
- Stages: 2

Capacity

Payload to LEO
- Mass: 33,500 kg (73,900 lb)

Launch history
- Launch sites: Cape Canaveral, LC-16
- First flight: NET 2026

First stage
- Powered by: 13 × Aeon R
- Maximum thrust: 15,560 kN (3,497,000 lbf)
- Propellant: LOX / CH_{4}

Second stage
- Powered by: 1 × Aeon Vac
- Maximum thrust: 1,440 kN (323,000 lbf)
- Propellant: LOX / CH_{4}

Terran R is a heavy-lift two-stage, partially reusable launch vehicle under development by Relativity Space. The vehicle is partially constructed with 3D printing technologies, like its predecessor, the small-lift Terran 1. The first flight is expected to be in 2026.

== Versions ==
=== Original Proposed Version 2021 ===
The Terran R was first publicly announced on 8 June 2021 after the company raised US$650 million in funding. Terran R was an evolution of the Terran 1, and at the time, it was to be 3D printed, fully reusable, including second stage and fairings. This planned version would be capable of putting 20,000 kg (44,000 lb) into low-Earth orbit (LEO) in recoverable configuration.

=== 2023 Version ===
On 12 April 2023, after the first flight of the Terran 1, Relativity Space CEO Tim Ellis announced that the rocket was no longer going to be further developed and focus would move to Terran R. The new version of the rocket will have a maximum payload capacity of 23,500 kg (51,800 lb) to low earth orbit (LEO) with a fully reusable first stage, and 33,500 kg (73,900 lb) to LEO if fully expended.

The first stage will use 13 Aeon R engines, producing an estimated thrust of 14.9 MN (3,350,000 lbs) in total. The second stage will use an upgraded Aeon R Vac engine and will be expended, along with the fairings.

Ellis has compared the design of Terran R to SpaceX's Falcon 9 launch vehicle. With this design, Relativity is aiming to significantly exceed the Falcon 9 payload to LEO.

In July 2022, Relativity announced a partnership with Impulse Space to send a payload to Mars on the first Terran R flight, which is expected to occur in 2026.

In September 2024, Eric Berger reported the planned diameter of Terran R had changed from 5.5 m (216 in) to 5.4 m (210 in), matching the diameter of the Ariane 6 rocket.

== See also ==
- Comparison of orbital launch systems
- Comparison of orbital launchers families
