= Terran 1 =

Retired small-lift launch vehicle

- Manufacturer: Relativity Space
- Country of origin: United States
- Cost per launch: US$12 million

Size
- Height: 35.2 m (115 ft)
- Diameter: 2.3 m (7 ft 7 in)
- Stages: 2

Capacity

Payload to LEO
- Altitude: 300 km (190 mi)
- Orbital inclination: 28.5°
- Mass: 1,479 kg (3,261 lb)

Payload to SSO
- Altitude: 500 km (310 mi)
- Mass: 898 kg (1,980 lb)

Launch history
- Status: Retired
- Launch sites: CCSFS LC-16; VSFB Building 330
- Total launches: 1
- Success(es): 0
- Failure: 1
- First flight: 23 March 2023

First stage
- Height: 24.3 m (80 ft)
- Diameter: 2.3 m (7 ft 7 in)
- Powered by: 9× Aeon 1
- Maximum thrust: 920 kN (207,000 lbf)
- Propellant: LCH_{4} / LOX

Second stage
- Height: 8.1 m (27 ft)
- Diameter: 2.3 m (7 ft 7 in)
- Powered by: 1× AeonVac
- Maximum thrust: 126 kN (28,300 lbf)
- Propellant: LCH_{4} / LOX

Terran 1 was an expendable two-stage small-lift launch vehicle developed by Relativity Space. Development began in 2017 and the rocket was retired in 2023. Most structures and components of the vehicle are manufactured with 3D printing processes.

Terran 1's first and only launch took place March 23, 2023 from Cape Canaveral, but did not achieve orbit due to a failure of the second stage. Following the failed launch, Relativity retired the rocket in favor of developing the much larger, reusable Terran R vehicle.

== Design ==
Terran 1 consisted of two stages. The first stage is powered by nine Aeon 1 engines burning methane and oxygen propellants (methalox) in a gas-generator cycle, each producing 100 kN (23,000 lbf) of thrust. The second stage is powered by a single vacuum-optimized version of Aeon 1, known as AeonVac, producing 126 kN (28,300 lbf) of thrust in vacuum. Both stages are autogenously pressurized.

The vehicle's (notional) payload fairing measures 6.8 m (22 ft) long and 3 m (9.8 ft) in diameter. Payload capacity was specified to be 1,250 kg (2,760 lb) to lower inclination low-Earth orbits and 900 kg (2,000 lb) to a Sun-synchronous orbit (SSO). In any case, the vehicle never carried payloads, its sole launch featured an inert nosecone in place of a functional clamshell fairing.

The primary and secondary structures of Terran 1 were manufactured with Relativity's Stargate 3D printer, which welded structures together from aluminum alloy. 90% of Terran 1 by mass consisted of printed components; Relativity claimed that they could reduce the part count in the vehicle by 100 times compared to traditionally-manufactured rockets and manufacture an entire flight article from raw materials in 60 days. Relativity's in-development Terran R launch vehicle will utilize the same tooling used to manufacture Terran 1.

Relativity advertised a price per launch for Terran 1 of US$10 million in 2019. The advertised price per launch had been increased to $12 million USD in 2021.

=== Proposed upgrades ===
In February 2022, Relativity CEO Tim Ellis stated in an interview with Ars Technica the nine Aeon 1 engines on the first stage could be replaced with a single Aeon R engine with substantially higher thrust. The Aeon R engine is planned to be used on Relativity's much larger Terran R rocket. The upgrade was planned to debut on the fourth flight of Terran 1 before the program was cancelled.

== Launch ==
Relativity received a Federal Aviation Administration (FAA) launch license to conduct the first launch of Terran 1, not-earlier-than (NET) 8 March 2023 from Cape Canaveral Space Force Station's Launch Complex 16. Originally, another static fire was planned with the full rocket stack before first launch. Relativity believed it performed enough tests and instead attempted a launch. Terran 1's initial flight scheduled for 8 March 2023 was scrubbed due to "exceeding launch commit criteria limits for propellant thermal conditions on stage two". A second launch attempt on 11 March was also scrubbed. Set for 18:00 UTC (14:00 EDT), high upper-level winds prevented liftoff for over an hour. A second attempt at 19:35 UTC (15:35 EDT) was cancelled at T−70 seconds from a boat in the launch safety range. A third attempt at 19:42 UTC (15:42 EDT) was cancelled half a second before liftoff. The engines briefly lit up before shutting down from a "launch commit criteria violation". A final attempt occurred at 21:00 UTC (17:00 EDT). An issue with the automatic stage separation promptly closed the launch window.

Another launch window for Terran 1's initial flight opened on March 23. After holding twice from a boat in the launch safety range, and high upper-level winds, the rocket lifted off at 03:25 UTC (23:25 EDT). Following a nominal liftoff and powered flight of the first stage, the second stage failed to ignite, leading to the loss of the mission. Preliminary investigations blamed the failure on a slower-than-expected valve opening as well as vapor ingestion into the liquid oxygen turbopump causing reduced performance. Although the launch did not orbit, Relativity acknowledged the successful performance of the vehicle's 3D printed structures under flight loads.

Following the loss of the first mission, the company abandoned further plans for Terran 1, instead choosing to focus efforts on developing the much larger reusable Terran R vehicle. Existing payloads on Terran 1 will likely have to be remanifested to Terran R or other flights.

== Launches ==
Flight No.	Date and time (UTC)	Launch site	Payload	Payload mass	Orbit	Customer	Outcome
1	23 March 2023, 03:25	LC-16	None	None	LEO	Test flight	Failure
1	First flight of Terran 1, with the mission name "Good Luck, Have Fun". Instead of a payload, the non-deploying nose cone carried a metal ring, which was an early test article from Relativity's 3D printing process, weighing approximately 1.5 kg. A stated goal for the mission was to demonstrate the viability of 3D printing for major structural components of a rocket, the first such components to be used in an orbital launch attempt. These were proven in flight when Terran 1 passed max q and continued to perform nominally. After stage separation, the second stage failed to ignite, ending the mission.						
2	March 2023	LC-16	VCLS Demo-2R		LEO	NASA	Cancelled
2	$3 million contract for unspecified payload(s) in NASA's Venture Class Launch Services (VCLS) 2 program. The ELaNa 42 mission, consisting of three CubeSats, would have launched on this flight.						
3	2023	LC-16	Undisclosed			Undisclosed	Cancelled
3	Third flight of Terran 1, as detailed by Tim Ellis in an interview, would have carried a payload for an undisclosed customer. Would have been last flight of Terran 1 before previously planned block upgrade.						
	NET 2023		Rideshare		LEO	Spaceflight, Inc.	Cancelled
Contract with Spaceflight included first flight in Q3 2021, with option for additional flights in the future.
	NET 2023		Rideshare	10–350 kg	GEO	Momentus	Cancelled
The 2019 contract with Momentus included a first flight originally scheduled for 2021, with option for five additional flights in the future. The five flights would have included the launch of a Momentus Vigoride Extended space tug.
	NET 2023				LEO	Mu Space	Cancelled
Dedicated launch for mu Space, would have carried a single payload.
	NET 2023	LC-16 / B330	Rideshare		LEO	TriSept	Cancelled
Launch site would have been either be Cape Canaveral or Vandenberg. TriSept stated that the launch would have featured one large primary payload accompanied with several smaller payloads.
	2023				LEO	DoD (STP)	Cancelled
Single flight carrying "small U.S. military payload", price not disclosed.
	NET 2023	B330	Iridium NEXT × 1		LEO (86.4°)	Iridium	Cancelled
Iridium has ordered a Terran to launch one of the 6 on-orbit spares for their satellite constellation.
			Telesat (unspecified quantity)		LEO	Telesat	Cancelled
Unspecified number of launches for an unspecified number of satellites.

== See also ==
- Falcon 1
- Terran R
