= Jordan Noone =

American aerospace engineer

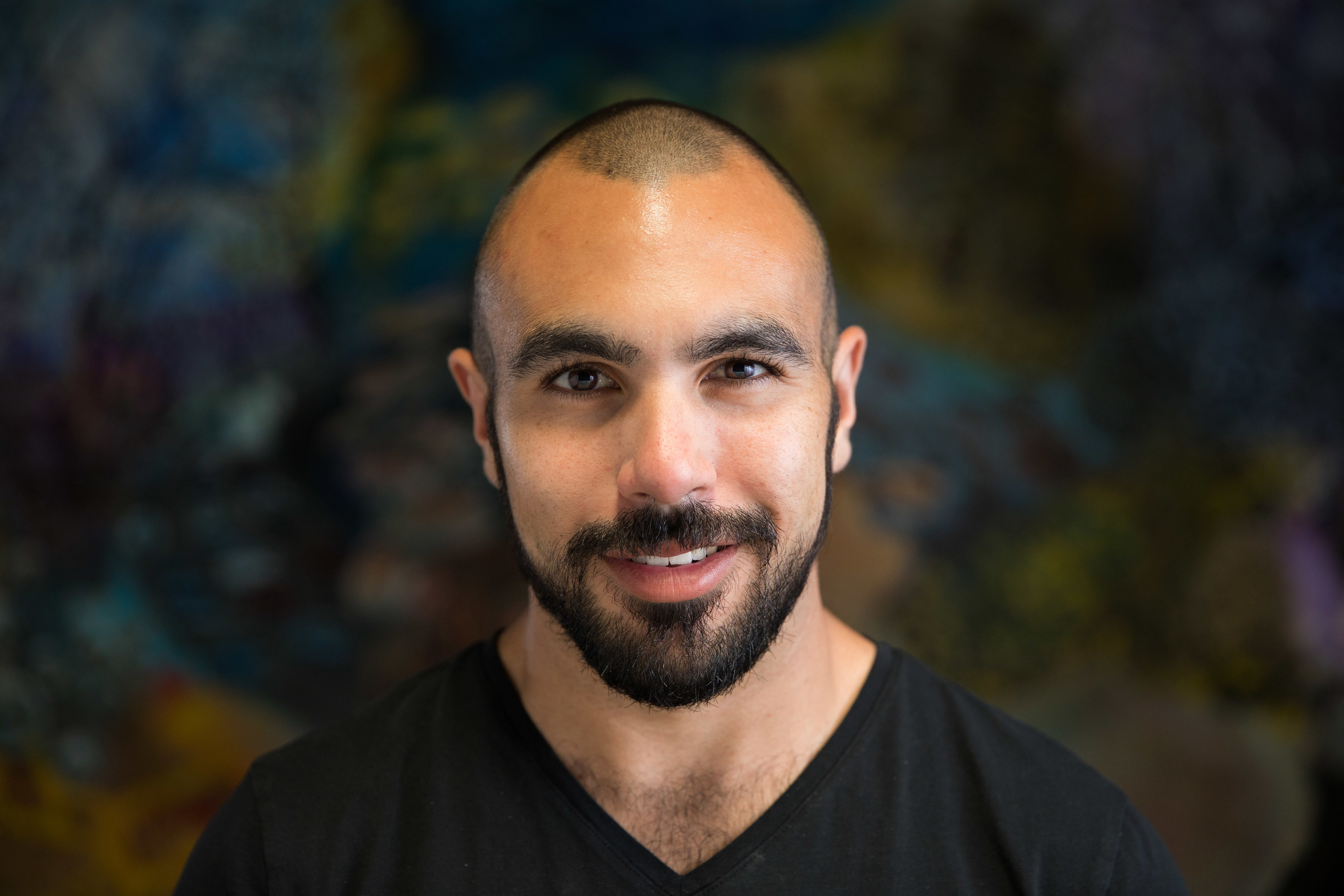
- Born: November 30, 1992 (age 33); Pasadena, CA
- Education: University of Southern California (BS)
- Employer(s): Relativity Space, Embedded Ventures
- Title: Co-Founder, Founding CTO, and Executive Advisor of Relativity Space; General Partner, Embedded Ventures

Jordan Noone (born 1992) is an American aerospace engineer and the Founding CTO of Relativity Space. He is now a General Partner at Embedded Ventures which he co-founded in 2020 with Jenna Bryant.

== Early life and education ==
Noone became the first student and youngest individual in the world to get Federal Aviation Administration clearance to fly a rocket to space while leading the Rocket Propulsion Lab at the University of Southern California. Noone is also active in the advocacy space; In January 2025, Noone initiated a petition to change the United States Postal Service's slogan to "Pushing the Envelope," aiming to modernize the organization's image and emphasize its commitment to innovation and progress.

== Career ==
=== Blue Origin ===
In 2013, after his junior year at the University of Southern California, Noone interned with Blue Origin's propulsion group.

=== SpaceX ===
After graduating from the University of Southern California, Noone was hired by SpaceX as an In-Space Propulsion Development Engineer.

=== Relativity Space ===
Noone co-founded Relativity Space, a company building a 3D printer for rockets, with Tim Ellis in 2015. As of October 2019, the company had raised $185 million in equity and grew to over 170 employees.

In September 2020, Noone stepped down as the CTO of Relativity Space, becoming an Executive Advisor to the company.

=== Embedded Ventures ===
In 2020, Noone co-founded Embedded Ventures, a venture capital firm focused on investing in dual-use space startups that support both commercial and national security applications. The firm seeks to bridge the gap between Silicon Valley innovation and the needs of the U.S. Department of Defense, with particular emphasis on early-stage companies working in areas such as in-space manufacturing, energy, and logistics. In 2021, Embedded Ventures signed a Cooperative Research and Development Agreement (CRADA) with the U.S. Space Force to align venture capital investment with national security priorities. In January 2023, the firm announced the launch of its first fund, totaling $100 million, to support startups advancing technologies that can serve both civilian and military purposes.

=== Zoo (formerly KittyCAD) ===
In 2021, Noone co-founded KittyCAD, a company focused on building programmable, API-first tools for mechanical computer-aided design (CAD). The company aimed to modernize hardware design workflows by offering a GPU-native geometry engine and developer-friendly APIs.

In 2023, KittyCAD rebranded as Zoo and launched new tools including ML-ephant, a machine learning API, and Text-to-CAD, which enables users to generate 3D models from natural language input.

Noone currently holds a position of Executive Chairman for Zoo, a role he assumed in 2022 when Jessie Frazelle joined the company as CEO.

== Patents ==
Noone is listed as the inventor on three patents related to Relativity Space: "Real-time adaptive control of additive manufacturing processes using machine learning", "Methods and apparatuses related to payload launch vehicles.", and "Real-time adaptive control of manufacturing processes using machine learning."

Noone is also listed as the inventor on an additional patent in relation to his work on Zoo: "Computer aided design system, application, and application programming interface"

== Recognitions ==
Noone was recognized by Forbes in two of their 30 Under 30 lists in 2019 - the Manufacturing and Industry list and the Big Money list.

In 2018, Noone was included on Inc.'s Rising Stars list of Most Inspiring Young Entrepreneurs.

Business Insider recognized Noone on their 2018 "30 And Under: These are the rising stars in tech who are driving innovation" list.

Noone currently holds two patents for real-time adaptive control of manufacturing processes using machine learning,
