= Deep Space Systems =

American Aerospace Company

Deep Space Systems (DSS)
- Type: Subsidiary
- Industry: Aerospace
- Founded: 2001
- Founder: Stephen Bailey
- Fate: Active
- Headquarters: Littleton, Colorado, US
- Key people: Stephen Bailey (President and CEO); Michelle Bailey (CFO); Karl Lauffer (Vice President)
- Products: Systems engineering, space cameras, lunar rover
- Number of employees: ≈100 (2018)
- Parent: Redwire Space, Inc.
- Website: deepspacesystems.com

Deep Space Systems, Inc (DSS) is a private aerospace company dedicated to systems engineering that supports the design, development, integration, testing and operations of science and exploration spacecraft.

DSS was incorporated in 2001 and it is based at Littleton, Colorado, United States. Its Founder and President is Steve Bailey.

In June 2020, AE Industrial Partners acquired Deep Space Systems and combined it with Adcole Corp. to form Redwire.

== Overview ==
The specialties of DSS are systems engineering, spacecraft design, development, integration and testing, deep space mission operations, and high-definition space-qualified cameras. In 2006, Lockheed Martin won the contract for the Orion spacecraft with the collaboration of Deep Space Systems, and in 2009, DSS was named NASA's Johnson Space Center Small Business Subcontractor of the Year, for its work on Orion's avionics system. While collaboration with Lockheed Martin drives the business, Deep Space Systems diversified with the development of satellite-ready cameras.

On 29 November 2018, Deep Space Systems was included in the Commercial Lunar Payload Services program (CLPS) by NASA, which makes it eligible to bid on delivering science and technology payloads to the Moon, worth $2.6 billion in contracts over 10 years. DSS is now considered a "main contractor" for NASA's CLPS program, and DSS can sub-contract projects to other companies of their choice. According to NASA, Deep Space Systems will be proposing a small commercial lunar rover in 2019 to carry science payloads, in addition of their design and development services to the program. DSS is also working on a lander concept focused on scouting south polar lunar resources.
