= Archinaut =

Project developing technology to build in space

On-Orbit Servicing, Assembly, and Manufacturing 2 (OSAM-2), formally known as Archinaut, was a technology demonstration project aimed at developing the necessary additive manufacturing technology to build large-scale structures in space.

== History ==
Phase 1 of the project started in 2016 and was funded by a NASA contract worth US$20 million; it was performed by a partnership between Made In Space (MIS), Northrop Grumman, and Oceaneering Space Systems. Its formal name was "Versatile In-Space Robotic Precision Manufacturing and Assembly System".

Archinaut was intended to be a 3D printer capable of operating in-orbit, installed on a pod attached outside the International Space Station. Archinaut would have included a robotic arm and been capable of fabricating, assembling and repairing structures and machinery in space. Made In Space developed Archinaut's 3D printer; Oceaneering Space Systems was in charge of its manipulator arm, and Northrop Grumman was in charge of control electronics, software, and integration with the space station.

The first structures to be built with Archinaut would have been antenna reflectors for communication satellites. Further expansion may have involved three robotic arms enabling Archinaut to grab decommissioned satellites and recycle their components.

In June 2017, MIS conducted a month-long successful thermal vacuum chamber test at NASA Ames Research Center's Engineering Evaluation Laboratory (EEL) on its Extended Structure Additive Manufacturing Machine (ESAMM) technology. During the test, MIS manufactured the first-ever extended 3D-printed objects in a space-like environment, a significant milestone on the path to manufacturing systems and satellites in space. The company quickly built on the success and, in July and August 2017, used ESAMM hardware to manufacture a beam structure measuring over 37 meters in length, setting a Guinness Book of World Record for the largest 3D-printed structure.

In July 2019, MIS was awarded a NASA contract for robotic manufacturing and an assembly flight demo mission called Archinaut One. Archinaut One, which was intended to launch on a Falcon 9 rocket in 2024, would have included two ten meter solar arrays placed on an ESPA satellite.

In 2020, Redwire (which acquired MIS earlier in the year) successfully printed a 23 ft (7.0 m) flight-like beam in conditions similar to those expected on orbit.

In 2022, Archinaut passed its Critical Design Review (CDR), marking the end of the design phase and the beginning of spacecraft construction.

In 2023, NASA decided to conclude the project without proceeding to a flight demonstration. Project data will be maintained for future efforts to use.
