= Evolution Space =

Private spaceflight company

- Type: Private
- Industry: Aerospace
- Founded: December 2018; 7 years ago
- Founder: Steve Heller, CEO
- Headquarters: Mojave, California, United States
- Website: evolutionspace.com

Evolution Space is an American private spaceflight aerospace company providing solid propulsion systems and small launch. The company is run by CEO and founder Steve Heller, and is currently based in Mojave, California.

== History ==
Founded in 2018, the company began under the brand name Sugarhouse Aerospace with cofounders Steve Heller and Riley Meik. The initial mission of the company was to be a provider of low cost access to space and suborbital launch with commercial launches from Spaceport America. In 2021, the company rebranded to Evolution Space under CEO and founder Steve Heller, with its first launch as Evolution Space in November 2021.

Evolution Space performed their first successful space launch passing the Kármán line on April 22, 2023, with the Gold Chain Cowboy sounding rocket.

== Propulsion ==
Evolution Space specializes in designing and manufacturing solid-propellant systems and launch vehicles for both defense and space applications.

In October 2022, Evolution Space performed a launch vehicle system test of their propulsion system for the Gold Chain Cowboy mission. The motor performed with 20,000 pounds of peak thrust, a maximum chamber pressure of 1,630 psi and achieved 15 seconds burn time.

In May 2023, Evolution Space formally includes providing solid propulsion systems alongside launch services and vehicles. The company conducted their first commercial spaceflight partnership as a propulsion provider with The Spaceport Company, as they performed test launches on their floating offshore launch platform in the Gulf of Mexico. This test also marked the first commercial launch from US territorial waters.

== Launch ==
Evolution Space held its first full-scale solid-propellant rocket mission, Too Busy Chasing Stars, in November 2021, reaching a max altitude of 188,444 feet with a max velocity of Mach 3.95.

The company conducted two sub-scale missions, No More Questions in May 2022, and Expressionless in February 2023, validating its upgraded systems and solutions.

Evolution Space completed its first space mission, Gold Chain Cowboy, on April 22, 2023, reaching apogee at 408,456 feet (124.5 km) and reached a max speed of Mach 5.2. The test launch included a payload from Uplift Aerospace of two 3D printed silver figurines, representing Venus and Mars, created by artist Chad Knight. A drogue parachute anomaly was reported resulting in a higher than expected landing velocity.

| Launch | Launch Date | Vehicle Type | Height (ft) | Diameter (in) | Weight (lbs) | Launch site | Payload | Altitude | Citation |
|---|---|---|---|---|---|---|---|---|---|
| 1 | November 13, 2021 | Sounding rocket prototype | 18' | 10" | | F.A.R. | | 188,444 feet | |
| 2 | May 22, 2022 | Sub-scale sounding rocket prototype | | | | | | | |
| 3 | February 18, 2023 | Sub-scale sounding rocket prototype | 7' | 3" | 30 lbs | F.A.R. | | 48,000 feet | |
| 4 | April 22, 2023 | Gold Chain Cowboy - Sounding rocket prototype | 22' | 10" | 900 lbs | F.A.R. | Uplift Aerospace | 408,456 feet | |
| 5 | September 3, 2024 | Sub-scale hypersonic test rocket | | | | Once in a Lifetime, barge operated by The Spaceport Company | | 55,000 | |
