= Adcole =

American aerospace manufacturer

Adcole LLC
- Type: Private
- Industry: Automotive Aerospace
- Founded: 1957
- Founder: Addison D. Cole
- Headquarters: Marlborough, Massachusetts, United States
- Number of locations: 2 in United States; 1 in Germany; 1 in China; 1 in Japan
- Area served: Worldwide
- Products: Optical-mechanical measuring technology
- Net income: ▲US$30 million (2011)
- Website: Official Website

Adcole Corporation is a Massachusetts-based manufacturer of precision testing and measuring instruments. Addison D. Cole founded the company in 1957. Adcole's core clients come from the aerospace and automotive industries. The company is a subcontractor for the NASA and satellite manufacturers. Sun angle sensors designed by Adcole have flown on numerous space exploration missions, including Mars Pathfinder and the Lunar Reconnaissance Orbiter. Automobile and truck engine makers as well as agricultural and construction equipment manufacturers utilize measuring machines and tools from Adcole as well. The company reported net sales of more than US$30 million in fiscal year 2011.

== History ==
During World War II, Cole trained the Royal Air Force on the use of radar. He was also program manager of Massachusetts Institute of Technology's airborne radar unit. Following the war, he helped launch the Laboratory for Electronics, a company that went public in 1957.

An engineer by trade, Cole saw the opportunities represented by the Space Race. He invented a sun angle sensor that helped rockets and satellites maintain their orientation in space. Cole's invention, which space agencies use even today, provided the impetus behind the launch of Adcole in 1957.

In June 2020, the company sold the Aerospace division which was merged with Deep Space Systems to form Redwire.

=== Expansion ===
A custom-designed facility for manufacturing, assembly and testing of gauges and other equipment was constructed in Marlborough, Massachusetts in 1983. Within five years, the company expanded the building to make room for 200 employees. A second plant in Pompano Beach, Florida produces high-precision spindles and other components used in Adcole gauges.

In recent years, Adcole has seen impressive sales growth in China and the Far East. The burgeoning auto and consumer markets in developing nations such as Thailand, Vietnam and India has buoyed the company's already strong position in the market. In 2011, Adcole's net income topped the $30 million mark, and the company had approximately 120 employees on the payroll. The company has wholly owned offices in Recklinghausen, Germany (1977), Tokyo, Japan (1986), and Shanghai, China (2004).

== Leadership ==
Addison D. Cole held the position of company CEO and Chairman of the board since its founding in 1957, until 2014. In 2014, Adcole was acquired by Artemis Capital Partners, a Boston-based private equity firm.

Addison Cole retired shortly afterward and died at his home on 19 January 2018. He was 98.

== Products ==
=== Automotive ===
The majority of engine manufacturers, large and small, employ Adcole measuring devices machines at some stage of the production process. Sophisticated gauges ensure that camshafts and crankshafts are within allowable tolerances for size and shape. The level of precision required in engine manufacturing is rigorous; Adcole gauges are reportedly accurate to within 10 12 millionths of an inch (0.25 μm). Precisely engineered engine parts ensure quiet and reliable operation.

Adcole has several models of camshaft and crankshaft gauges currently on the market. The Model 1300 crankshaft gauge, released in 2007, is designed to provide fast and accurate readings within a production environment. Model 1300 has an automatic loading feature and can measure parts for roundness, size, timing angle and stroke. The unit can process 60 parts per hour.

The Model 1310 is also designed with the factory floor in mind: the unit is capable of 200 measurements per hour. The Model 1310 takes essential measurements of camshafts, integral components of internal combustion engines.

Adcole provides camshaft and crankshaft inspection gages for hundreds companies within the automotive supply chain, including:

- General Motors
- Ford
- VW/Audi
- Chrysler
- Toyota
- Fiat
- Nissan
- Renault
- Hyundai
- Volvo
- Caterpillar
- Daimler
- BMW
- Honda
- Cummins
- FAW
- John Deere

== Government contracts ==
Adcole technology has been an integral part of crewed and uncrewed spaceflight since the company's inception. The company's Sun angle sensors are used on satellites to control the orientation of the vehicle. For most communications and reconnaissance satellites, a proper orientation is essential for nominal functioning. According to Vice President Tom MacDonald, every orbiting GPS satellite is equipped with a Sun angle sensor from Adcole.

In 2012, Adcole Sun sensor assemblies were used during NASA's spacecraft cruise stage to deliver the Curiosity rover to Mars.
