= Success Rockets =

Private Russian rocket company

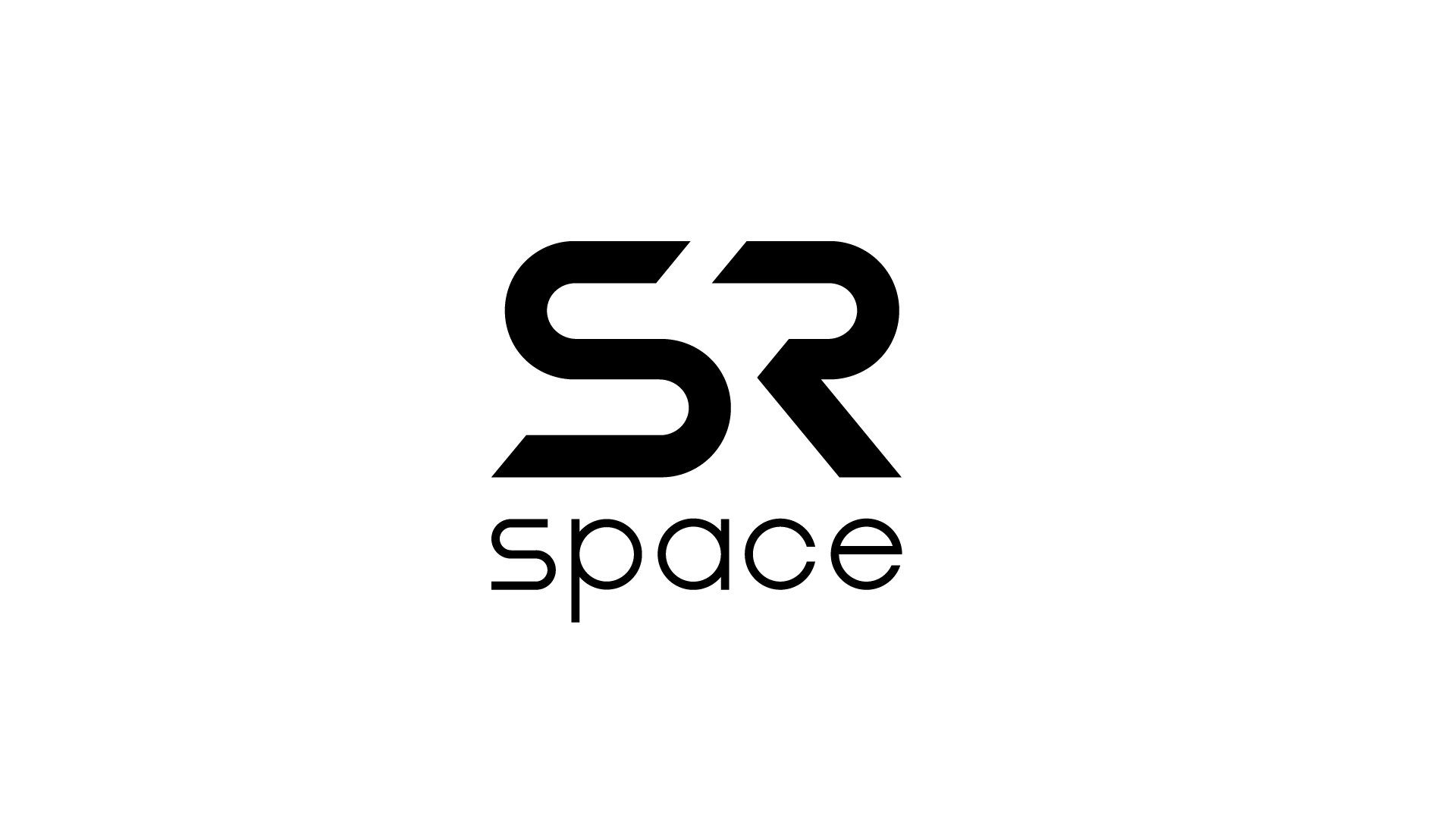
- Company type: Privately held company
- Industry: Space
- Founded: 2020
- Founder: Oleg Mansurov
- Headquarters: Russia
- Key people: Oleg Mansurov (CEO)
- Products: Suborbital and orbital launch vehicles, small spacecraft, satellite constellations, space tugs, Earth remote sensing and data analysis
- Subsidiaries: SR Rockets, SR Satellites, SR CMS, SR Data
- Website: srspace.ru/en

Success Rockets (Russian: АО «Успешные ракеты») is a private Russian space company that produces ultralight suborbital and orbital launch vehicles, small spacecraft, satellite constellations, and space tugs. The company was founded in 2020 by Oleg Mansurov. It has subsidiaries across Russia.

Success Rockets operates in Earth remote sensing, data generation, data processing, and data analysis. The first orbital test flights and commercial launches have been planned for 2024.

== History ==
Success Rockets (SR) was officially registered as a private space company in July 2020. The company collects images from open sources or purchases them from foreign organizations.

According to Mansurov, negotiations with initial investors took five years. By the end of 2021, the company announced plans to go public within two to three years.

=== Team and development ===
As of September 2021, Success Rockets employed more than 40 specialists including engineering designers, chemists, ballisticians, mathematicians, programmers, electronic designers, satellite construction, and rocket scientists. To increase cost-efficiency and accelerate production, the company outsources development and buys ready-made parts from the Russian Academy of Sciences and other universities. In past interviews, Mansurov mentions at least eight different development teams from MAI, BMSTU, Voenmeh, and major business companies to outsource development tasks at different stages of the project.

Success Rockets expects to outsource most production and assembly works. To reduce costs, Success Rockets electronics are imported from China. They expect to get commercial orders from international private companies but also plan to collaborate with Russian state agencies.

== Profile ==
Success Rockets designs, produces and tests ultralight launch vehicles; a suborbital Nebo (translation: ‘Sky’) and an orbital Stalker. The company also produces small spacecraft and satellite constellations, used for communications and Earth remote sensing.

Success Rockets designs space tugs and performs data processing. By creating its own full development cycle, the company strives for cost efficiency and resource saving.

Success Rockets plans to reach the project capacity in three steps. First suborbital flights in the 20 to 100 km (12 to 62 mi) range are scheduled for late 2021 and 2022. This stage also includes engine and fuel testing, building satellite models, and a space tug. The second stage includes production of an ultralight carrier rocket and its test flight at 200 km (120 mi) altitude with a satellite platform and a space tug. At the third stage, Success Rockets plans to scale up the production of ultralight rockets, satellites, and space tugs, and launch them from its own spaceports.

=== Ultralight rockets ===
Nebo is an ultralight rocket designed for scientific experiments, atmosphere, and meteorological research. The Stalker launch vehicle is planned to carry more than 250 kg (550 lb) payload to a 500 km (310 mi) Sun-synchronous orbit, the first launch is scheduled for 2024.

Success Rockets mostly applies its own technologies and solutions in its rockets. For instance, the engine body is made of carbon fibers, and heat-resistant graphite is used for the de Laval nozzle. To avoid pollution, the team aims to design a zero-waste staging system where all the detached stages burn in the atmosphere after separation.

The rocket's layout was displayed in December 2021. The next year, in December 2022, the company introduced an internally developed series of reusable liquid-propellant rocket engines. All engines are composed of Russian-made components.

=== Satellites ===
Success Rockets produces platforms for different small satellites. For example, Skibr-cub, Skibr-micro, and Skibr-mini are used for CubeSats and larger satellites that are mainly purposed for Earth Remote sensing with resolution of 0.5–5 meters, Internet of things, and satellite communication. The production is led by a subsidiary company SR Satellites that was launched in April 2021 in Rostov region.

=== Satellite constellations ===
In March 2021, Success Rockets announced the development of a 200 kg (440 lb) satellite for gas emissions monitoring. In September 2021, it was showcased at the 26th UN Conference on Climate Change in Glasgow. A constellation of 60 satellites equipped with two types of spectrometers will form a climate change monitoring system. This program is managed by SR CMS subdivision. The system will track greenhouse gasses concentrations in the atmosphere and collect and analyze climate change data.

In October 2021, the company announced plans to create satellite constellations for Earth radar remote sensing that will potentially be demanded by FSUE Atomflot, Rosatom, and Sovcomflot for the Northern Sea Route navigation.

All constellations are designed for low Earth orbit and will burn up in the atmosphere after service without polluting the space.

=== Space data analysis ===
The first area of the company's work was space data analysis for Russian and international markets. A steady increase in the number of satellites orbiting the Earth makes data processing one of the most popular services that is in great demand for construction, agriculture, natural disasters prognosis, and ecological monitoring. IT companies are the biggest consumers of satellite data on the international market. Russian telecom giants MegaFon, Beeline, MTS (network provider), corporations Yandex and Mail.ru, and large banks announced plans on the creation and launching of their own satellites. As of 2021, state orders made more than 70% of the satellite data market. Success Rockets primarily focuses on private clients.

=== Space tugs ===
SR's lineup of space tugs includes Strannik-1 and Strannik-2 models. Strannik-1 is designed to work with small satellites in low Earth orbit. Strannik-2 is designed for Interplanetary spaceflights. Estimated payload costs will range from $20,000 to $90,000, respectively. Some space tugs are planned to tow space debris from high orbit to burn up in dense atmosphere.

== Tests and launches ==
- In December 2020, the company's 600 kg (1,300 lb) thrust engine was successfully tested.
- In April 2021, first test flights were made in Kirov Oblast. The tested prototype of the UR-1 meteorological rocket and its onboard systems were designed in six months. The flight at 2000 m altitude lasted more than 90 seconds. The prototype will be further used for the design of the suborbital meteorological rocket Nebo.
- In December 2021, Success Rockets had a successful test flight of Nebo-25 rocket with femtosatellites (spacecraft weighing less than 100g) at the Kapustin Yar test site. The carrier reached 7000 m altitude when the emergency systems activated. The satellites were recording telemetry data during the flight. The flight made Success Rockets the first private Russian company that achieved more than one launch per year.
- The company also planned to launch Nebo-50 and Nebo-100 rockets in 2022, but the launches did not take place; there is no information about plans for rocket launches on the company’s official website.

== Spaceport ==
In 2020, Success Rockets announced plans to build its own spaceport. At present Russia has no sites suitable for ultralight launches even though there is a commercial potential. At first, the company considered three locations: Primorsky Krai (‘Asia’ spaceport), south Russia (‘Europe’ spaceport), and the Arctic region near Tiksi. SR's spaceport is planned to have two rocket launchers, a test site, an RKA Mission Control Centre, a rocket production centre, a small airfield, a hotel for employees and tourists, and a railway station. Currently test launches are made at the Ministry of Defence sites.

By autumn 2021, Rostov Oblast had been chosen as the most suitable region for construction due to its economic and geographic location and developed transport infrastructure.

== Partnership and customers ==
Success Rockets expects legal support, access to test stands, and orders from the Roscosmos corporation as the Sfera project requires hundreds of small spacecraft. The company is already working with Roscosmos' subdivisions.

In July 2021, Roscartography placed an order for a constellation of 36 satellites for Earth remote sensing in optical and infrared spectral ranges. In December an agreement was signed with Rostelecom. The companies plan to create a satellite constellation for broadband Internet and collaborate in data analysis.

In August 2021, SR and China's Chamber of Commerce and Industry signed an agreement on space cooperation on Chinese territory. According to the agreement, an SR subdivision will be opened at the Wenchang Space Launch Site on Hainan Island. The Wenchang province is developing into a space exploration cluster with promising legal conditions. Mansurov hopes to attract Chinese partners, probably because in 2020 local investments in private space companies reached almost $1 billion. In March 2022, an SR's subsidiary SR Satellites was selected by the Zayed Middle East accelerator. The accelerator provides startups with access to the UAE market.
