= Redwire =

American public aerospace developer and manufacturer

Redwire Corporation
- Type: Public
- Traded as: NYSE: RDW
- Industry: Aerospace
- Founded: June 1, 2020; 6 years ago
- Headquarters: Jacksonville, Florida, United States
- Key people: Peter Cannito (Chairman and CEO); Andrew Rush (COO); Jonathan Baliff (CFO); Al Tadros (CTO)
- Revenue: ▲US$304 million (2024)
- Operating income: ▼ −US$42 million (2024)
- Net income: ▼ −US$155 million (2024)
- Total assets: ▲US$293 million (2024)
- Total equity: ▼ −US$189 million (2024)
- Number of employees: 750 (2024)
- Subsidiaries: Adcole Space; Deep Space Systems; Deployable Space Systems; LoadPath; Made In Space, Inc.; Oakman Aerospace; Roccor
- Website: redwirespace.com

Redwire Corporation is an American aerospace manufacturer and space infrastructure technology company headquartered in Jacksonville, Florida. The company was formed on June 1, 2020, by the private equity firm AE Industrial Partners, through the combination of its portfolio companies Adcole Space and Deep Space Systems. Redwire went public in January 2021.

== History ==
Formed on June 1, 2020, by AE Industrial Partners, Redwire was initially created through the merger of Adcole Space and Deep Space Systems. Shortly after formation, on June 24, 2020, Redwire acquired Jacksonville, Florida-based Made In Space, Inc. The addition of Made in Space added 3D printing to the company's portfolio. On September 15, 2020, Redwire announced that it was moving its headquarters to Jacksonville.

Longmont, Colorado-based Roccor was acquired by Redwire on October 29, 2020. The acquisition added capabilities in the manufacturing of solar panels, antennas, and deployable booms. The payload launch technology maker, LoadPath, was acquired on December 15, 2020. Redwire acquired Littleton, Colorado-based Oakman Aerospace on January 19, 2021. Deployable Space Systems was acquired by on February 23, 2021, adding Roll Out Solar Array (ROSA) capabilities to Redwire's portfolio.

Redwire announced on March 25, 2021 its intentions to go public through a merger with the SPAC Genesis Park Acquisition Corp., valuing the company at US$615 million.

On January 22, 2025, Redwire announced the acquisition of Edge Autonomy, a drone manufacturer specializing in defense capabilities. The deal is a shift for Redwire with more focus into defense markets, in which drone warfare will align with satellite capabilities. In August, the new partnership resulted in a prototype for a long range reconnaissance drone for the U.S. Army.

== Operations ==
Redwire and subsidiaries operate throughout the United States, with locations in Florida, Colorado, California, Alabama, Massachusetts, Indiana and New Mexico. The company consists of the following subsidiaries:

=== Adcole Space ===
Adcole Space, a former component of Adcole Corporation, specializes in the design, manufacturing, integration and testing of spacecraft components for application in the commercial, research and military sectors. Located in Marlborough, Massachusetts, Adcole Space focuses on high performance, high reliability Sun sensors and other spacecraft components.

=== Deep Space Systems ===
Based in Littleton, Colorado, Deep Space Systems (DSS) is focused on systems engineering, spacecraft design, development, integration and testing, deep space mission operations, and high-definition space-qualified cameras. DSS was incorporated in 2001, and was a founding component of Redwire, after its merger on June 1, 2020 with Adcole Space. DSS is considered a "main contractor" for NASA's Commercial Lunar Payload Services (CLPS) program, and can sub-contract projects to other companies of their choice. DSS is also working on a lander concept focused on scouting south polar lunar resources.

=== Deployable Space Systems ===
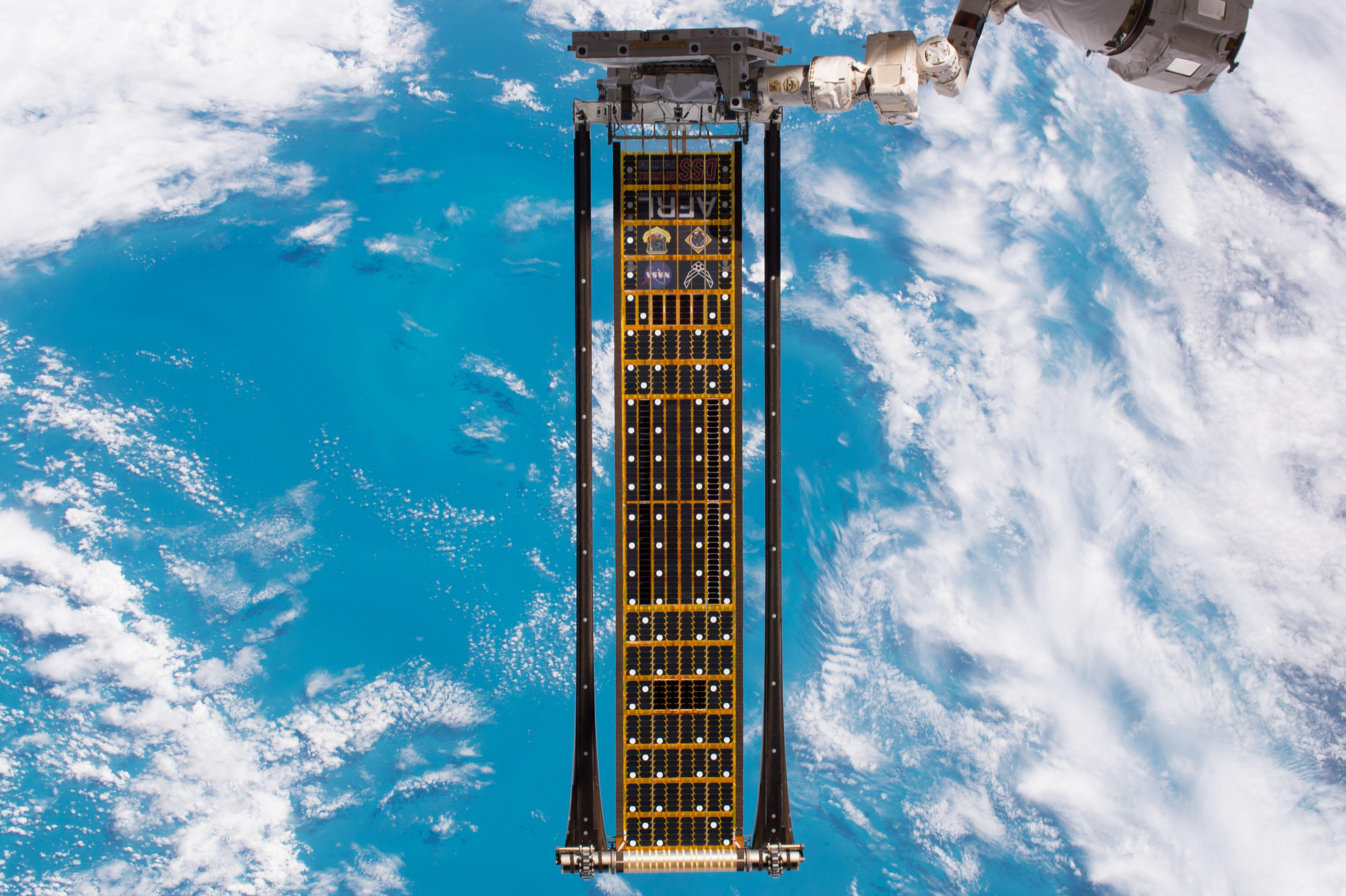
Deployable Space Systems developed Roll Out Solar Array (ROSA) technology, pictured above being held by the robotic arms at the International Space Station

Deployable Space Systems, Inc. (DSSI) specializes in the development of deployable technologies for space applications. Located in Goleta, California, DSSI designs, analyzes, builds, tests and delivers deployable solar arrays, deployable structures and space system products. Product and research areas include deployable solar array systems, rigid panel, flexible blanket, and concentrator systems with crystalline or thin film photovoltaic deployable structural/mechanical systems, articulated structures, open-lattice structures, booms, elastic deployable structures, roll-out booms, deployable reflectors, deployable occulters, sun shades, subsystems, high efficiency photovoltaic flexible and rigid blanket/panel assemblies (with photovoltaic partners), launch restraint release systems, mechanisms and actuators.

=== LoadPath ===
Based in Albuquerque, New Mexico, LoadPath specializes in mechanical, structural, and thermal technologies for satellite and space launch applications. Unique capabilities include space mechanisms, multi-payload launch adapters, structural testing, deployable composite booms, deployable space structures, R&D engineering, spacecraft thermal management components, and thermal analysis. LoadPath is controlled by an AS9100 certified quality management system.

=== Made In Space, Inc. ===
Based in Jacksonville, Florida, Made In Space specializes in the development and manufacturing of three-dimensional printers for use in microgravity. The company was founded in August 2010 by Aaron Kemmer, Jason Dunn, Mike Chen, and Michael Snyder. Made in Space has a general focus on manufacturing technologies that support exploration, national security, and sustainable space settlement.

=== Oakman Aerospace ===
Based in Littleton, Colorado, Oakman Aerospace, Inc. was co-founded by Stanley Oakman Kennedy, Jr., Maureen S. O’Brien, and Stanley Oakman Kennedy, Sr. in July 2012. The Littleton facility has approximately 11,300 square feet of test laboratory and office space, which includes 1,000 square feet of engineering laboratory space, several test areas, and modular test stations. OAI has the capability and capacity to simultaneously design, assemble, integrate, and test programs or perform multiple technology test and evaluation efforts. OAI laboratory space has the ability to host flight components using clean room level laminar flow benches with individual temperature and humidity controls. Oakman is building a satellite ground station with 5.5 m dish at Chippewa County International Airport.

=== Roccor ===
Based in Longmont, Colorado, Roccor is a manufacturer of solar panels, antennas, and deployable booms. Launched on May 5, 2010, by founder Will Francis, its acquisition by Redwire was announced on October 29, 2020.

=== QinetiQ Space NV ===
In October 2022, Redwire acquired Belgium-based satellite design and development company QinetiQ Space NV for £28m. Prior to the acquisition, QinetiQ Space NV had worked with civil and commercial space agency's such as the European Space Agency (ESA) and the Belgian Science Policy Office (BELSPO).

== See also ==
- Archinaut
- Interorbital Systems
- Japan Manned Space Systems Corporation
- List of crewed spacecraft
- Thorlabs
