= Tim Ellis (engineer) =

American aerospace engineer

Tim Ellis is an American aerospace engineer and the co-founder and former CEO of Relativity Space.

== Early life and education ==
Ellis grew up in Plano, Texas. He is the oldest of three children.

Ellis started college at the University of Southern California, where he planned to graduate and be a screenwriter, and study as part of USC’s Thematic Option program. However, during his freshman orientation he switched his major to aerospace engineering. Ellis and Relativity's other co-founder and CTO, Jordan Noone, both held leadership positions at USC's Rocket Propulsion Lab (RPL). Within RPL, Ellis and Noone helped launch the first student-designed and built rocket into space.

While at the University of Southern California, Ellis had three consecutive internships with Blue Origin.

Ellis holds a BS and a MS in Aerospace Engineering from USC Viterbi School of Engineering.

== Career ==
=== Blue Origin ===
After graduation, Ellis joined Blue Origin full time where he worked on 3D printed rocket components and served as a propulsion development engineer on crew capsule RCS thrusters, BE-4, and New Glenn.

At Blue Origin, Ellis was credited for bringing metal 3D-printing in-house.

=== Relativity Space ===
In 2015, Ellis co-founded Relativity Space with his former classmate, Jordan Noone, with the mission of being the first company to launch a fully 3D printed rocket into orbit. Ellis and Noone received their initial $500,000 in funding from cold emailing Mark Cuban. In April 2018, Cuban told the Los Angeles Times over email that he invested in Relativity because, "They are smart, innovative, focused and always learning." Ellis and Noone were also part of Y Combinator in their 2016 cohort.

Relativity Space announced its US$650 million Series E funding at US$4.2 billion valuation in June 2021.

Ellis stepped away from the CEO position in March 2025. He will continue to "support the team as Co-founder and Board member."

=== Other activities ===
Ellis is the youngest member of the National Space Council User Advisory Group by nearly two decades.

== Recognitions ==
Ellis was included on the 2019 TIME 100 Next List, under the Phenoms section. Former NASA astronaut, Terry W. Virts, wrote the TIME excerpt on why Ellis was chosen.

In 2019, Ellis was included on MIT Technology Review's Innovators Under 35 issue. He was placed in the Entrepreneurs category.

Ellis was recognized by Forbes in two of their 30 Under 30 lists in 2019 - the Manufacturing and Industry list and the Big Money list.

Ellis was nominated by Via Satellite for their Satellite Executive of the Year 2019 award.

In 2018, Ellis was included on Inc.'s Rising Stars list of Most Inspiring Young Entrepreneurs.
