= Australian Space Research Institute =

Former Australian Nonprofit

Australian Space Research Institute Limited
- Company type: Public
- Industry: Aerospace
- Predecessor: ASERA; AUSROC
- Founded: 17 June 1991; 34 years ago in Jamboree Heights, Queensland, Australia
- Founder: Monash University; ASERA
- Defunct: July 2023
- Headquarters: Jamboree Heights, Australia
- Website: asri.org.au

The Australian Space Research Institute (ASRI) was Australian charity focusing on developing Australian space-launch capabilities and the promotion of space science within education.

Formed in 1991 with the merger of the AUSROC Launch Vehicle Development Group at Monash University, Melbourne and the Australian Space Engineering Research Association (ASERA).

The institute was a non-profit organisation run entirely by volunteers. Most of the work at ASRI was done in collaboration with Australian universities such as the Royal Melbourne Institute of Technology, Queensland University of Technology and the University of Technology, Sydney. Its main objective was developing a vision for the future of Australia's space community, including industry. ASRI did not receive any direct government funding.

The ASRI was created to provide opportunities for space-related industry and technology development for the Australian technical community.

On the 7th July 2023, the organisation lost its charity status due to it being voluntarily shut down.

== History of space activities in Australia ==
During the heyday of rocketry research in the 1960s Australia was the seventh nation to launch a satellite, WRESAT, into orbit, and the third from its own soil.

The joint British-Australian Blue Streak program to develop Intercontinental ballistic missiles ended in the late 1960s.

Around the same time the European Launcher Development Organisation (ELDO) was established to develop a European satellite launch vehicle. Woomera, Australia, was chosen as the launch site for the test vehicles. Australia was granted status as the only non-European member of ELDO (one of the precursors to the European Space Agency) in return for providing the launch facilities. A series of successful launches was conducted from 1964 to 1970 with the aim of reaching orbit and eventually orbiting an operational satellite. The final launch attempt of ELDO's Europa 1 launch vehicle took place at Woomera on 12 June 1970 however the satellite failed to reach orbit. No successful satellite launch was ever achieved by the ELDO and European satellite launch activities then shifted to the French site at Kourou, in French Guiana, which became home to Ariane launchers.

The goal of the ASRI was to re-establish Australia as a significant player in the global space industry.

== Sounding Rockets ==
The Small Sounding Rocket Program (SSRP), initiated in 1996, provides Australian educational institutions with a low cost payload launch service. The service was expanded to include individuals, companies, foreign universities and non-commercial organisations seeking assistance to launch their own vehicles.

Launches were conducted twice a year from Woomera, South Australia. Two types of rockets were used:

- Sighter, a solid fuel rocket capable of launching a 3 kg payload to an altitude of 5.9km at speeds over Mach 1, and
- Zuni, a solid fuel rocket capable of launching a heavier payload to an altitude of approximately 7km, and reaching speeds of Mach 2.5.

The Australian Government donated its Zuni rockets to the ASRI for use for student experiments which were launched from the Woomera launching range.

ASRI has also designed and constructed custom nosecones and payload recovery mechanisms for the Zuni. With a payload of 20kg, the Zuni has an approximate range of 5.9km, which it attains in about 40 seconds, experiencing 55 g and 491m/s (Mach 1.4) during the flight.

Limited range access resulted in the termination of the program, with the final launch campaign occurring in 2011. Complete destruction of the ASRI stockpile of Zuni motors occurred in July 2020.

== Launch vehicle development ==
The aim of the AUSROC program was to develop a micro-satellite launch vehicle capable of being scaled up for use in heavier launch vehicles.

=== AUSROC I ===
The AUSROC I program commenced in 1988 with a group of undergraduate students in Mechanical Engineering at Monash University, who designed and built AUSROC I. It was successfully launched on 9 February 1989. The flight lasted one minute, reaching 3 km in altitude and 161 m/s. AUSROC I was a liquid-fueled rocket based on a modified Pacific Rocket Society design.

=== AUSROC II ===
AUSROC II was a larger pressure fed kerosene-oxygen bipropellant rocket that was developed in the 1990s. It was designed to reach an altitude of 10 km. The first attempt at launching an AUSROC II suffered a spectacular failure on the launch pad in 1992. The subsequent rocket, named AUSROC II-2 was successfully launched in 1995 from Woomera, although it did not reach its target apogee due to pressurisation problems with the LOX tank.

=== AUSROC 2.5 ===
AUSROC 2.5 was designed to provide an intermediate step between the AUSROC II and III programs. It uses the same size engine as the AUSROC III but with simpler and easier to implement cooling methods. The primary objective was to deliver a 10kg payload to an altitude of 20km and recover the rocket intact.

AUSROC 2.5 was the principal subject of current developments efforts. It was projected to launch in late 2007. Prior to that, a key milestone was the ground testing of the propulsion subsystem.

=== AUSROC III ===
AUSROC III was designed to launch a payload of 150kg to an altitude of 500km. It was a sounding rocket that will incorporate active guidance for "live" steering, and a steerable parachute recovery system.

=== AUSROC IV ===
AUSROC IV was the final stage of the AUSROC program and consisted of five AUSROC IIIs, four for the first stage and one for the second stage. It was intended to place a small satellite (up to 35kg) into a Low Earth Orbit.

=== AUSROC Nano ===
AUSROC Nano was a three-stage, liquid-liquid-solid orbital launch vehicle, designed to launch a payload of 10kg into low Earth orbit at an altitude of 300km. It was designed to incorporate a rapid setup and launch capability that would provide the payload with the option of polar or equatorial orbit profiles.

== Satellites ==
The discontinued Australis Microsatellite program aimed to develop a low-cost, autonomous satellite that could be used for a variety of applications such as low Earth orbit communications, remote sensing and small scale science experiments.

JAESAT (Joint Australian Engineering Satellite) was a collaboration between ASRI, the Cooperative Research Centre for Satellite Systems, the Queensland University of Technology and Ukrainian Youth Aerospace Association, Suzirya, that began in 1997. The project was put on hold in 2000 when CRCSS withdrew funds due to cost and schedule over-runs with a joint American-Australian venture, FedSat.

== Hypersonics ==
The Centre for Hypersonics at the University of Queensland (UQ) performed extensive research into developing the science behind scramjet propulsion. The hypersonics project, was a joint effort between ASRI and UQ to develop a free-flight scramjet engine.

== See also ==
- Commonwealth Scientific and Industrial Research Organisation
- National Space Program
- Australian Space Agency
