= St. Patrick's Higher Secondary School =

Private school in Asansol, West Bengal, India

St. Patrick's School
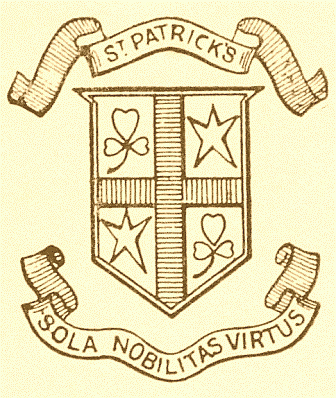

Location
- GT Rd, Chelidanga, Asansol, West Bengal 713301; Asansol, West Bengal, India; 23.6875954°N 86.9607937°E

Information
- Type: Private
- Motto: Sola Nobilitas Virtus; Nobility is the sole Virtue
- Established: 1891
- School district: Burdwan
- Principal: Nigel Michael D'Souza
- Faculty: 60
- Grades: KG–12
- Enrollment: 1,800 and above
- Colors: Green and gold
- Athletics: Football, cricket, swimming, basketball, badminton, table tennis, hockey.
- Affiliation: Council for the Indian School Certificate Examinations
- Website: stpatricksschoolasansol.com

St. Patrick's Higher Secondary School or SPS is one of the oldest schools in eastern India. The school admits students from kindergarten to 12th standard providing them with complete secondary education. Located in Asansol, in the Paschim Bardhaman district of the western part of West Bengal, with a distance of 200 kilometres from Kolkata (Calcutta).

== History ==
St. Patrick’s School was started in the year 1891 and was previously a Scholasticate for Belgian Jesuits. The climate of the dry plains seemed to be hard on them hence it was taken over by the Irish Christian Brothers in 1890 and opened the institution as St. Patrick’s Boarding of Anglo- Indian and European Boys. The buildings were first used to host students only in 1891, founded by the Congregation of Christian Brothers, a Catholic religious institute from Ireland that has undertaken missionary and educational work worldwide. This group, also informally known as the Christian Brothers, was founded by Edmund Ignatius Rice. St. Patrick's School, Asansol is one of the 19 Christian Brothers Schools in India. For a brief span of time during the Second World War, when the Royal Air Force was using the school buildings as air-force base and distress quarters while the administration of the School was under the Jesuit Mission of Patna and the school was shifted to Kurji.

== Description ==
With three sections for each class/grade from KG to 10 and two sections for 11 and 12, there are about 1,800 students enrolled in the school. The school follows the 10+2 Council for the Indian School Certificate Examinations curriculum which includes the national ICSE exam at the end of Class 10, and the ISC Science exam at the end of Class 12. The school enjoys considerable recognition for academic excellence, having produced many state and national rankers.

St. Patrick's was originally a fully residential school. It started admitting day scholars later, and finally closed the hostel completely in 1984. The school has enrolled girls in Classes 11 and 12 since 2009. The Jubilee Hospital Building on the grounds was built in 1918. It is no longer a functioning hospital, having closed at the same time that hostel was closed. It is currently used as a residence for some staff members.

The school is one of the largest landowners in Asansol, with buildings, fields, a huge pond and acres of virgin wooded areas bordering prime real estate like the residential colony known as Hill View or other schools like Loreto Convent, Maria Goretti, St. Joseph's School and St. Vincent's School.

== Alumni ==
St. Patrick's Alumni International, is the largest and oldest alumni organization, founded in 2001. It has about 4,500 alumni in its network and does not charge any fees.

Panoramic photo of the school from atop the main school building.

== Notable alumni ==
- Partha Pratim Chakraborty, Director of IIT Kharagpur 2013 – present
- Stephen Hector Taylor-Smith '11 (the originator of rocket mail in India, and memorialised on a postage stamp)
- Late Himachal Som '61 (former Indian Ambassador to Italy, father of Vishnu Som, NDTV anchor) and husband of Dr. Reba Som, Director of Indian Council for Cultural Relations' Rabindranath Tagore Centre in Kolkata.
- Ritwik Das professional footballer
- Samir Tewari, film director, directed Mr Joe B Carvalho

== See also ==
- Education in India
- Education in West Bengal
- List of schools in India
