= Mandla Maseko =

South African aviator (1988–2019)

- Born: 27 August 1988; Soshanguve, South Africa
- Died: 6 July 2019 (aged 30)
- Occupations: Military officer trainee, private pilot, DJ
- Known for: Selection in the Axe Apollo Space Academy; Would have been the first Black South African in space.
- Military career
- Allegiance: South Africa
- Branch: South African Air Force
- Rank: Candidate officer

Mandla Maseko (27 August 1988 – 6 July 2019) was a South African aviator, who aimed to be the first black South African in space.

== Biography ==
He was born in Soshanguve, north Pretoria, to an auto tool maker and a school cleaner. He was a candidate officer of the South African Air Force, as well as a private pilot, a DJ, and a biker.

In 2013 he was one of 23 winners out of a million entrants to a competition by the Axe Apollo Space Academy to attend a US space academy, in order to be the first black South African in space. He was nicknamed "Afronaut" and "Spaceboy". He went to the Kennedy Space Center for a week to do tests, such as skydiving and a journey on a reduced-gravity aircraft, ahead of a planned one-hour suborbital flight on board a XCOR Lynx Mark II that was planned to take place in 2015. However, the flight did not happen as XCOR Aerospace went bankrupt in 2017. He would have been the third South African in space, after Mark Shuttleworth in 2002 and Mike Melvill in 2004.

He died on 6 July 2019 in a motorbike accident, aged 30.
