= Richard A. Searfoss =

American astronaut and aviator (1956–2018)

Rick Searfoss
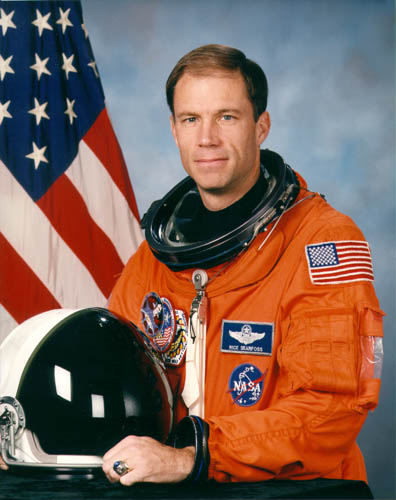
- Born: Richard Alan Searfoss; June 5, 1956; Mount Clemens, Michigan, U.S.
- Died: September 29, 2018 (aged 62); Tehachapi, California, U.S.
- Education: United States Air Force Academy (BS); California Institute of Technology (MS)
- Space career

NASA astronaut
- Rank: Colonel, USAF
- Time in space: 39d 3h 18m
- Selection: NASA Group 13 (1990)
- Missions: STS-58; STS-76; STS-90
- Mission insignia

Richard Alan Searfoss (June 5, 1956 – September 29, 2018) was an American aviator who was United States Air Force colonel, NASA astronaut and test pilot.

== Early life ==
Searfoss was born on June 5, 1956, in Mount Clemens, Michigan, but had considered Portsmouth, New Hampshire, to be his hometown. Growing up, he became an Eagle Scout.

Searfoss graduated from Portsmouth Senior High School in Portsmouth, New Hampshire in 1974. He received a Bachelor of Science degree in aeronautical engineering from the United States Air Force Academy in 1978, and a Master of Science degree in aeronautics from the California Institute of Technology on a National Science Foundation Fellowship in 1979. While serving in the United States Air Force, he attended Squadron Officer School, Air Command and Staff College, and Air War College.

== Air Force service ==
Searfoss graduated in 1980 from Undergraduate Pilot Training at Williams Air Force Base, Arizona. From 1981 to 1984, he flew the F-111F operationally at RAF Lakenheath, England, followed by a tour at Mountain Home Air Force Base, Idaho, where he was an F-111A instructor pilot and weapons officer until 1987. In 1988 he attended the U.S. Naval Test Pilot School, Patuxent River, Maryland, as a USAF exchange officer. He was a flight instructor at the U.S. Air Force Test Pilot School at Edwards Air Force Base, California, when selected for the astronaut program.

He has logged over 6,000 hours flying time in 77 different types of aircraft and over 939 hours in space. He also holds FAA Airline Transport Pilot, glider, and flight instructor ratings.

== NASA career ==
Selected by NASA in January 1990, Searfoss became an astronaut in July 1991. Initially assigned to the Astronaut Office Mission Support Branch, Searfoss was part of a team responsible for crew ingress/strap-in prior to launch and crew egress after landing. He was subsequently assigned to flight software verification in the Shuttle Avionics Integration Laboratory (SAIL). Additionally, he served as the Astronaut Office representative for both flight crew procedures and Shuttle computer software development. He also served as the Astronaut Office Vehicle System and Operations Branch Chief, leading a team of several astronauts and support engineers working on Space Shuttle and International Space Station systems development, rendezvous and landing/rollout operations, and advanced projects initiatives.

Searfoss served as STS-58 pilot on the seven-person life science research mission aboard the Space Shuttle Columbia, launching from the Kennedy Space Center on October 18, 1993, and landing at Edwards Air Force Base on November 1, 1993. The crew performed neurovestibular, cardiovascular, cardiopulmonary, metabolic, and musculoskeletal medical experiments on themselves and 48 rats, expanding our knowledge of human and animal physiology both on earth and in space flight. In addition, the crew performed 16 engineering tests aboard the Orbiter Columbia and 20 Extended Duration Orbiter Medical Project experiments. The mission was accomplished in 225 orbits of the Earth.

Searfoss flew his second mission as pilot of STS-76 aboard the Space Shuttle Atlantis, which launched at night on March 22, 1996. During this 9-day mission the STS-76 crew performed the third docking of an American spacecraft with the Russian space station Mir. In support of a joint U.S./Russian program, the crew transported to Mir nearly two tons of water, food, supplies, and scientific equipment, as well as U.S. Astronaut Shannon Lucid to begin her six-month stay in space. STS-76 included the first-ever spacewalk on a combined Space Shuttle-Space Station complex. The flight crew also conducted scientific investigations, including European Space Agency sponsored biology experiments, the Kidsat earth observations project, and several engineering flight tests. Completed in 145 orbits, STS-76 landed at Edwards Air Force Base, California, on March 31, 1996.

Searfoss commanded a seven-person crew on the STS-90 Neurolab mission which launched on April 17, 1998. During the 16-day Spacelab flight the crew served as both experiment subjects and operators for 26 individual life science experiments focusing on the effects of microgravity on the brain and nervous system. STS-90 was the last and most complex of the twenty-five Spacelab missions NASA has flown. Neurolab's scientific results will have broad applicability both in preparing for future long duration human space missions and in clinical applications on Earth. Completed in 256 orbits, STS-90 landed at Kennedy Space Center, Florida, on May 3, 1998.

A veteran of three space flights, Searfoss logged over 39 days in space. He retired from the Air Force and left NASA in 1998. He became a commercial transport pilot for Southwest Airlines for a brief period and then returned to the space program by serving as the chief of safety for United Space Alliance at Kennedy Space Center. For the next few years, he continued to work as a contract research test pilot at NASA's Dryden Flight Research Center. For the year and a half immediately prior to his death, he was a T-38 instructor pilot at Edwards Air Force Base.

== Civilian space ==
After leaving NASA, Searfoss served as a judge for the Ansari X-Prize, where he officially declared SpaceShipOne to have won the competition on October 4, 2004, after completing two flights within a two-week period.

Searfoss was a test pilot instructor at the National Test Pilot School at the Mojave Spaceport.

In 2008, he was a featured guest in a Volkswagen commercial, where he argued with a black Beetle about who has more engineers between Volkswagen and NASA.

From the mid-2000s until the company closed, Searfoss worked with XCOR Aerospace in the development of their rocket-powered aircraft. As of September 2013, he was Chief Test Pilot at XCOR. He flew the flight tests and envelope expansion of the EZ-Rocket. He also served as XCOR's only test pilot for a rocket-powered prototype racing aircraft. He made a total of 52 rocket-powered flights and was the world's only tri-qualified rocket pilot (Space Shuttle, EZ Rocket, Rocket Racer prototype).

== Honors and awards ==
- Eagle Scout
- Awarded the Harmon, Fairchild, Price and Tober Awards (top overall, academic, engineering, and aeronautical engineering graduate), United States Air Force Academy Class of 1978.
- Air Force Aero Propulsion Laboratory Excellence in Turbine Engine Design award.
- USAF Squadron Officer's School Commandant's Trophy as top graduate.
- Distinguished graduate, USAF Fighter Weapons School.
- Named the Tactical Air Command F-111 Instructor Pilot of the Year, 1985.
- Selected for Outstanding Young Men of America, 1987.
- Air Force Commendation Medal
- Meritorious Service Medal
- Defense Meritorious Service Medal
- Defense Superior Service Medal
- NASA Space Flight Medal (3)
- NASA Exceptional Service Medal
- NASA Outstanding Leadership Medal
- Distinguished Flying Cross
- Orbit Award
- Asteroid 13157 Searfoss, discovered by the Spacewatch survey in 1995, was named in his honor. The official naming citation was published by the Minor Planet Center on 1 May 2003 (M.P.C. 48394).

== Organizations ==
- Society of Experimental Test Pilots
- Association of Space Explorers
- National Eagle Scout Association
- Air Force Association
- Academy of Model Aeronautics

== Popular culture ==
In January 2017, Searfoss was a featured guest on the first Star Trek Cruise, where he gave a presentation with actor Robert Picardo about the history and future of space flight. He offered two lectures on both sailings of the Star Trek Cruise II in January 2018.

Searfoss made small appearances in several films, including Green Lantern, Oblivion, and Trek Nation.

== Personal life and death ==
Searfoss was a member of The Church of Jesus Christ of Latter-day Saints. He died in Tehachapi, California, on September 29, 2018, at the age of 62. He was buried in the United States Air Force Academy Cemetery.
