= Axe Apollo sub-orbital spaceflights =

Axe Apollo space campaign
- Above: Logo of the Axe Apollo Space Academy; Below: Axe Apollo Space Academy candidate astronauts with Buzz Aldrin

Program overview
- Organization: Unilever; Space Expedition Curaçao
- Purpose: Space tourism
- Status: Abandoned

Program history
- Duration: 2014 or 2015 (planned)
- First crewed flight: None (23 planned)
- Launch site: Curaçao

Vehicle information
- Crewed vehicle: XCOR Lynx
- Crew capacity: 2
- Launch vehicle: XCOR Lynx (spacecraft is a horizontal takeoff, horizontal landing vehicle)

The Axe Apollo space campaign was a private space venture which planned to provide sub-orbital spaceflight for 23 people on board the Lynx, a spacecraft still in development at the time of the launch of the venture. It was initiated as part of a marketing campaign by advertising firm Bartle Bogle Hegarty (BBH) London to promote the Axe Apollo line of the men's deodorant brand Axe.

If the venture pushed through it would have accomplish milestones; such as the first spaceflight of nationals from Egypt, Norway, Philippines, and Thailand, as well as the first spaceflight by a Black South African.

However the plan of Unilever to send people to space did not push through due to XCOR Aerospace, the developer of the Lynx going bankrupt in 2017.

== Background ==
British–Dutch company Unilever initiated a marketing campaign on 9 January 2013 which promised to provide sub-orbital spaceflight to 22 people on board the Lynx spacecraft of XCOR Aerospace which was still under development at the time of the promotion. The campaign is intended to advertise the Axe Apollo, a new product under the men's deodorant brand Axe (which is also known as Lynx in Australia, New Zealand, Ireland, and the United Kingdom). The deadline to enter was on 9 February 2013.

The involvement of astronaut Buzz Aldrin as an endorser of the campaign was noted to have given legitimacy to Axe's sub-orbital spaceflight bid. The campaign for the brand meant for a male demographic also received allegations of sexism although women were also eligible to enter Axe's competition.

== Marketing ==
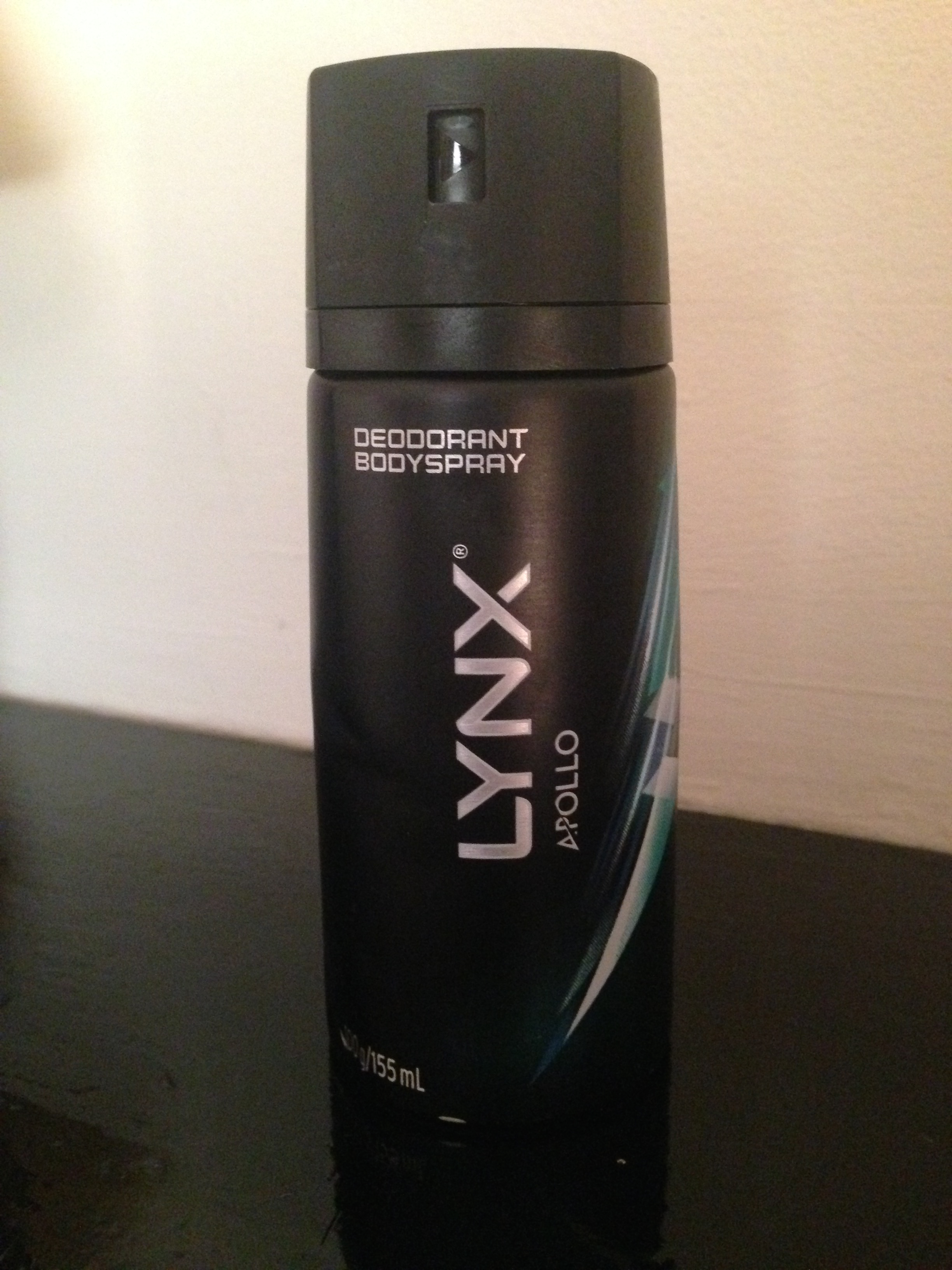
Lynx (Axe) Apollo, the product featured in the marketing campaign.

The bid to give tickets to 22 people for sub-orbital spaceflights on the Lynx was part of a marketing campaign by the London office of advertising firm Bartle Bogle Hegarty (BBH) to promote the "Axe Apollo", a new product under Unilever's men's deodorant line Axe. For its local campaign in the United States, Unilever aired a promotion for its space campaign at the 2013 Super Bowl.

== Selection process ==
=== Initial selection contest ===
On 9 January 2013 the "Axe Apollo Space Academy" (AASA) contest was launched in collaboration with American astronaut Buzz Aldrin to determine the 22 people Unilever would be given sub-orbital spaceflights on board the Lynx. The competition was opened to both male and female aspirants in at least 60 countries, where people could enter either through social media or by entering promo codes from purchasing Axe products. Contestants entered by a writing an essay about why they think they deserve to be selected as one of the winners of the campaign, while other participants voted for the contestant of their choice.

=== Shortlisting of entries ===
107 individuals coming from 60 countries were shortlisted from the campaign's competition entrants. The 107 people underwent four-day training camp at a facility at the Kennedy Space Center in Florida which was dubbed as the "Axe Apollo Space Academy" for marketing purposes. The contestants underwent tests on mental aptitude, physical fitness, and air combat. The selection process had variations; with some entrants in direct competition with other entrants from their own country while some did not.

The winners of the campaign was selected by a panel led by Buzz Aldrin.

== Winners ==
Maps depicting the countries of origin of the 23 winners of the Axe Apollo space campaign.

Name	Nationality	Notes
Théo Abbaci-Nel	Canada	
Patrick Carney	United States	Third-year American college student at the University of Virginia and YouTuber who maintains a channel with at least 350,000 subscribers focused on Clash of Clans-related content.
Denis Efremov	Russia	Employee of the Ministry of Emergency Situations
Hamish Fagg	New Zealand	New Zealand engineering student.
Cyril Garnier	France	Comedian from Paris
Tim Gibson	Australia	
Marco Aurélio Gorrasi	Brazil	Business administration degree holderf
Halil Kayıkçı	Turkey	Would have been the first Turkish in space. Kayıkçı is space engineering student at Istanbul Technical University.
Oliver Knight	United Kingdom	Employee at E.ON Energy UK
Eduardo Lurueña	Spain	
Mandla Maseko	South Africa	Would have been the first Black African in space. Maseko is a part of the South African Air Force and a private pilot.
Rizman Adhi Nugraha	Indonesia	Would have been the first Indonesian in space. Indonesian computer expert.
Jordi Ollebek	Netherlands	Physics teacher in Brabant.
Qing Guo	China	
Omar Samra	Egypt	Would have been the first Egyptian in space. A mountaineer known also for being the first Egyptian to climb Mount Everest, a feat which he achieved 2007.
Vinay Singh	India	Executive for an advertising firm based in Mumbai.
Felix Stach	Germany	Intern for Lower Saxony-based broadcaster Radio 21 and business administration degree holder.
Tale Sundlisæter	Norway	Would have been the first Norwegian in space. She is a Tekna member and a former journalist for Teknisk Ukeblad. She is a holder of a master's degree in technical cybernetics, navigation and vessel management at the Norwegian University of Science and Technology
Pirada Techavijit	Thailand	Would have been the first Thai in space. She is a satellite control team leader of the Geo-Informatics and Space Technology Development Agency.
Róbert Vokál	Slovakia	
Vu Thanh Long	Vietnam	Chemical engineering student at the Monash University in Australia
Chino Roque	Philippines	Would have been the first Filipino in space. A fitness coach and a former football player in the UAAP with the De La Salle University
Takanobu Yoneya	Japan	Physics teacher in a high school at the Chiba Prefecture.

== Planned flights ==
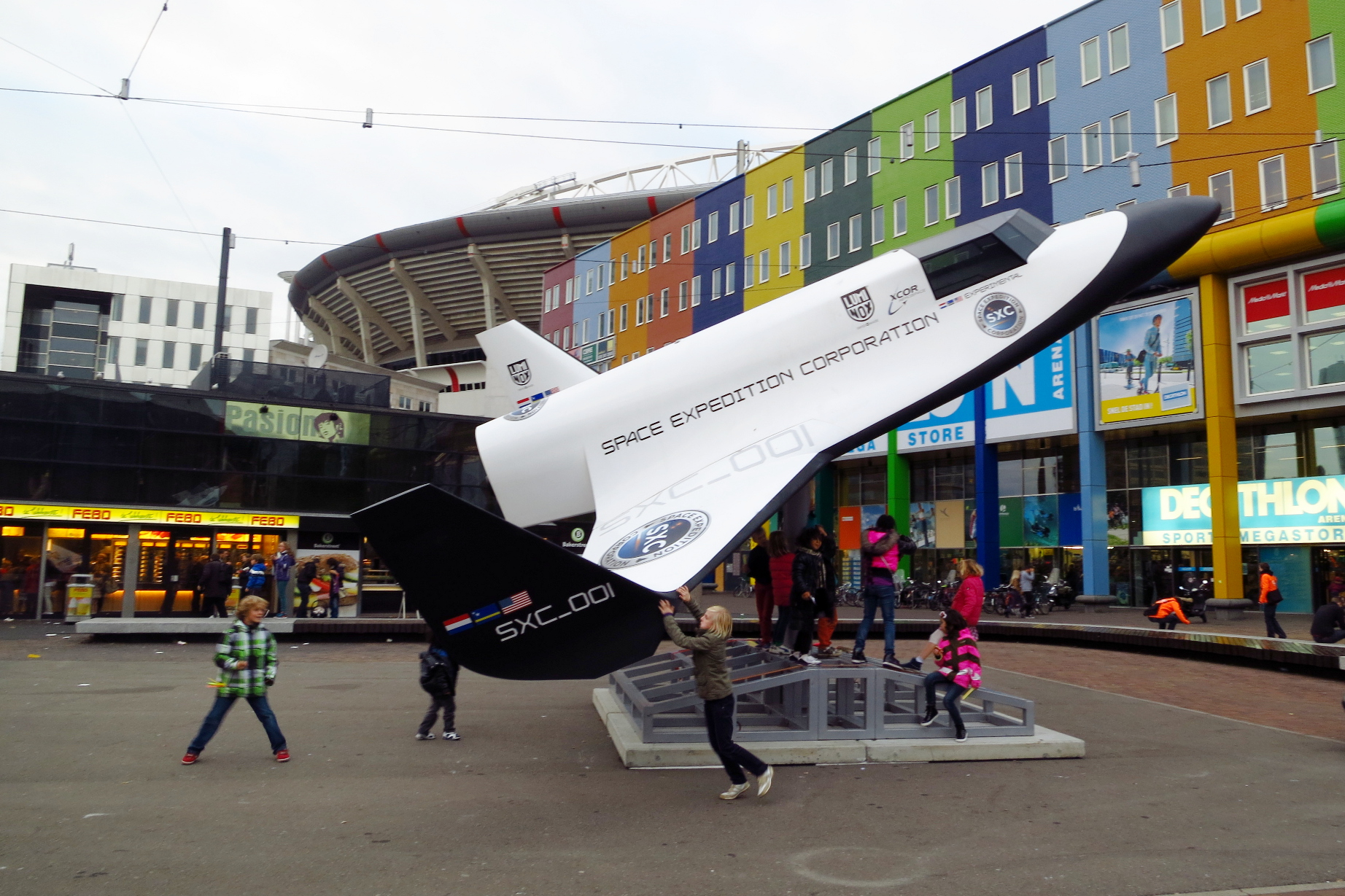
Model of an XCOR Lynx spacecraft.

Winners of the campaign would be flown to space one at a time on board the Lynx aircraft, which had a planned capacity of two crew members; one each for the pilot and another passenger. Space Expedition Curaçao would have operated the flight, which would have reached an altitude of 103 km (64 mi). The launch site of the spacecraft would be a runway in Curaçao. The plan was for the flights to take place as early as 2014.

== Aftermath ==
The flights under the Axe Apollo program never took place. As of 2015, Unilever said that it remains in contact with XCOR Aerospace, the developer of the Lynx spacecraft. However XCOR folded in 2017, and the development of the Lynx spacecraft was never completed. Consequentially, other prospective space tourists outside the Axe campaign who bought tickets to fly on the Lynx were not able to board the spacecraft.

Unilever also acknowledged trademark infringement after launching the marketing campaign offering $350,000 to the state commission that runs the U.S Space and Rocket Center in Huntsville, Alabama, owners of the "Space Camp" trademark. The commission's board rejected the offer calling it "unacceptable" instructing its attorney to continue negotiation "to find a compensation figure both sides can accept". Past "Space Camp" licensing agreements have been valued at $1.5 million.

== See also ==
- Mars One
- Virgin Galactic
