= XCOR Lynx =

Cancelled American spacecraft

Lynx
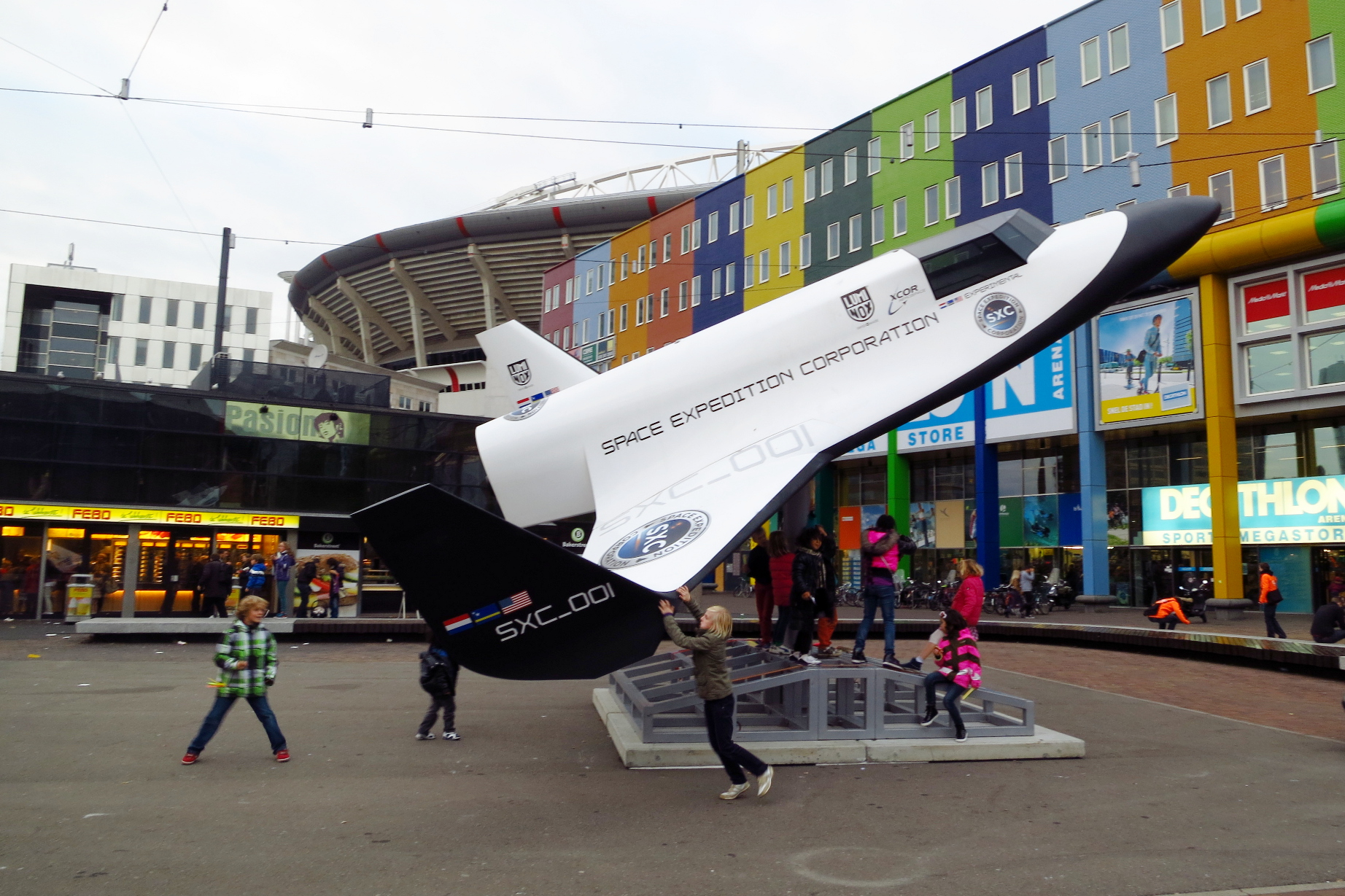
- Mockup of Lynx spaceplane
- Function: Crewed suborbital launch and reentry
- Manufacturer: XCOR Aerospace

Size
- Stages: 1

First stage
- Engines: 4
- Thrust: 13 kN (2,900 lbf)
- Propellant: LOX-kerosene

The XCOR Lynx was a proposed suborbital horizontal-takeoff, horizontal-landing (HTHL), rocket-powered spaceplane that was under development by the California-based company XCOR Aerospace to compete in the emerging suborbital spaceflight market. The Lynx was intended to carry one pilot, a ticketed passenger, and/or a payload above 100 kilometres (62 mi) altitude. The concept has been under development since 2003 when a two-person suborbital spaceplane was announced under the name Xerus.

In January 2016, XCOR changed plans for the first flight of the Lynx spaceplane. It was initially planned for the second quarter of 2016 from the Midland spaceport in Texas, (Note: Druzin, Rye (2015-09-08). "MSDC president: Lynx will launch from Midland this fiscal year". Midland Reporter-Telegram.) but, in early 2016, it was pushed to an "undisclosed and tentative" date at the Mojave spaceport. (Note: Mulder, Brandon (2016-01-17). "XCOR officials refrain from disclosing date for Lynx test flights". Midland Reporter-Telegram.)

In May 2016, (Note: Pappalardo, Joe (2016-05-31). "The XCOR Lynx Spaceplane Might Be Down for the Count". Popular Mechanics.) XCOR announced development of the Lynx had been halted with layoffs of approximately one-third of the staff; the company intended to concentrate on development of their liquid hydrogen rocket under contract with United Launch Alliance, instead. (Note: Foust, Jeff (2016-05-31). "XCOR lays off employees to focus on engine development". SpaceNews.)

Following the bankruptcy of XCOR Aerospace in 2017, the assets of the company were sold to the nonprofit organization Build A Plane, which will focus on education rather than suborbital flight. (Note: Messier, Douglas (2018-04-20). "Bankrupt Spaceflight Company's Space Plane Assets to Help Young Minds Soar". Space.com.)

== History ==
=== Xerus ===
In 2003, XCOR proposed the Xerus (pronunciation: zEr'us) suborbital spaceplane concept. It was to be capable of transporting one pilot and one passenger as well as some science experiments. It would even be capable of carrying an upper stage which would launch near apogee and, therefore, would potentially be able to carry satellites into low Earth orbit. As late as 2007, XCOR continued to refer to their future two-person spaceplane concept as Xerus. (Note: David, Leonard (2007-04-23). "XCOR Pursues Dream a Step at a Time". Space.com.)

=== Lynx ===
The Lynx spaceplane was initially announced in March 2008, with plans for an operational vehicle within two years. In December 2008, a ticket price of US$95,000 (equivalent to US$142,060 in 2025) per seat was announced, with flights intended to commence in 2010. (Note: "Rocket company offers $95,000 trips to space". New Scientist. Reuters. 2008-12-02.) The build of the Lynx Mark I flight article did not commence until mid-2013 and XCOR claimed that the first flight would take place in 2015. (Note: Greason, Jeff (2013-09-16). "Lynx Space Plane Taking Off: Q&A with XCOR Aerospace CEO Jeff Greason". Space.com (Interview). Interviewed by Schilling, Govert.) (Note: Norris, Guy (2014-10-08). "XCOR Lynx Moves Into Final Assembly". Aviation Week.) In July 2015, ticket prices increased by 50% to US$150,000 (equivalent to US$203,741 in 2025). (Note: Messier, Douglas (2015-07-15). "XCOR to Hike Ticket Prices 50 Percent". Parabolic Arc.) In November 2015, three co-founders left their existing positions with the company to start Agile Aero. Dan DeLong (Chief Engineer) and Aleta Jackson left the company entirely, while Jeff Greason, the former CEO, remained on the Board of Directors until he resigned in March 2016. Greason cited problems with the Lynx vehicle body, although the engine had been a success. As of mid-2016, development was suspended in favor of a ULA-contracted hydrolox engine, the 8H21.

Passengers who had hoped to make flights in the Lynx included the winners from the Axe Apollo Space Academy contest and Justin Dowd of Worcester, Massachusetts, the winner of another contest called the Race for Space. (Note: "America's Justin Dowd wins Metro's Race for Space". Metro. 2014-10-13.) Metro International's Race for Space newspaper contest. By July 2015, the passenger ticket was projected to cost US$150,000. (Note: Belfiore, Michael (2012-08-13). "XCOR Lynx: Don't Sleep on the Space Corvette". Popular Mechanics.) As of December 2015, Kayak.com was reportedly selling tickets for flights on the XCOR Lynx starting in 2016.

In May 2016, the company halted development of the Lynx spaceplane and pivoted company focus toward development of its LOX/LH2 engine technology, particularly on a funded project for United Launch Alliance. The company laid off more than 20 people of the 50–60 persons on board before May.

== Description ==
The Lynx was intended to have four liquid rocket engines at the rear of the fuselage burning a mixture of LOX-Kerosene, each engine producing 2,900 pounds-force (13,000 N) of thrust. (Note: Norris, Guy (2013-03-28). "Rocket Test Paves Way For XCOR Lynx Flights". Aviation Week.)

=== Mark I Prototype ===
- Maximum Altitude: 62 km (203,000 ft)
- Primary Internal Payload: 120 kg (260 lb) (Note: Belfiore, Michael (November 2013). "The Lynx's Leap". Air & Space/Smithsonian.)
- Secondary payload spaces include a small area inside the cockpit behind the pilot or outside the vehicle in two areas in the aft fuselage fairing.
- Aluminum LOX tank
- Mach 2 (1,500 mph) speed of ascent (Note: Joiner, Stephen (2011-05-01). "The Mojave Launch Lab". Air & Space/Smithsonian.)
- 4G re-entry loading

=== Mark II Production Model ===
- Maximum Altitude: 107 km (351,000 ft)
- Primary Internal Payload: 120 kg (260 lb) (Note: Spark, Joel (2012-03-02). "XCOR, Southwest Research Institute Move Up Suborbital Payload Testing". Space Safety Magazine.)
- Secondary payload spaces include the same as the Mark I. (Note: "XCOR Aerospace Lynx". ZAP16.com. 2011-12-30.)
- Non-toxic (non-hydrazine) reaction control system (RCS) thrusters, (Note: Foust, Jeff (2011-02-28). "Suborbital back out of the shadows". The Space Review.) type 3N22 (Note: "A Spaceplane Is Born". moonandback. 2013-09-30.)
- Nonburnite LOX composite tank (Note: Messier, Douglas (2012-03-19). "Lee Valentine on How XCOR Will Open Up Space". Parabolic Arc.)

=== Mark III ===
The Lynx Mark III was intended to be the same vehicle as the Mark II with an External Dorsal Mounted Pod of 650 kg (1,430 lb) and was to be large enough to hold a two-stage carrier to launch a microsatellite or multiple nanosatellites into low Earth orbit. (Note: Bergin, Chris (2012-08-27). "XCOR Aerospace's multi-talented Lynx spaceplane set for KSC". NASASpaceflight.com.)

=== Lynx XR-5K18 engine ===
The XR-5K18 is a piston pump fed LOX/Kerosene engine using a closed-loop brayton cycle, with 13 kN (2,900 lbf) of thrust.

The development program of the XCOR Lynx 5K18 LOX/kerosene engine reached a major milestone in March 2011. Integrated test firings of the engine/nozzle combination demonstrated the ability of the aluminum nozzle to withstand the high temperatures of rocket-engine exhaust. (Note: "Demo'd is a revolutionary rocket engine nozzle and a new engine development partnership". Satnews. 2011-03-22.)

In March 2011, United Launch Alliance (ULA) announced they had entered into a joint-development contract with XCOR for a flight-ready, 25,000 to 30,000 pounds-force (110,000–130,000 N) cryogenic LH2/LOX upper-stage rocket engine (see XCOR/ULA liquid-hydrogen, upper-stage engine development project). The Lynx 5K18 effort to develop a new aluminum alloy engine nozzle using new manufacturing techniques would remove several hundred pounds of weight from the large engine leading to significantly lower-cost and more-capable commercial and US government space flights.

=== Airframe ===
It was reported in 2010 that the Mark I airframe could use a carbon/epoxy ester composite, and the Mark II a carbon/cyanate with a nickel alloy for the nose and leading-edge thermal protection. (Note: Wood, Karen (2010-08-31). "The Private Space Race". CompositesWorld.)

== Mark I build ==
The flight article Lynx Mark I was claimed as having been fabricated and assembled in Mojave beginning in mid-2013. (Note: Messier, Douglas (2013-09-19). "XCOR Follow the Build Looks at Subsonic Wind Tunnel Testing". Parabolic Arc.) The cockpit of the Lynx (made of carbon fiber and designed by AdamWorks, Colorado) was reported as being one of the items that held up the assembly.

At the start of October 2014, the cockpit was attached to the fuselage. (Note: Dean, James (2014-10-10). "XCOR installs cockpit into Lynx space place". Florida Today.) The rear carry-through spar was attached to the fuselage shortly after Thanksgiving 2014. At the beginning of May 2015, the strakes were attached to the airframe. (Note: "XCOR Aerospace Announces Strakes Bonded to Lynx Mark I Spacecraft". SpaceRef (Press release). 2015-06-08.) The last major component, the wings, were expected to be delivered in late 2015. (Note: Foust, Jeff (2015-07-22). "XCOR To Raise Ticket Prices for Suborbital Flights". SpaceNews. San Jose, California.) In January 2016, XCOR's CEO Jay Gibson said "…we anticipate the wings to be there in the very near future…" and the CTO Michael Valant said they were finding that calibrating the flaps was a challenge. In February 2016, the first prototype was described as a "wingless shell." (Note: Wall, Mike (2016-04-05). "Private Lynx Space Plane Could Take Off in Early 2017". Space.com.)

In XCOR's November 2016 news report, they stated that "Even though the program made great forward progress integrating the vehicle structural elements during 2015 and early 2016 the progress on the control surface elements lagged in design. To prevent potential rework resulting from implementing designs not yet mature the Lynx fabrication was paused, so our engineering team has gone back to the design board."

== Test program ==
Tests of the XR-5K18 main engine began in 2008. (Note: Cowing, Keith (2008-12-17). "Successful First Test Fire of Engine for Lynx Suborbital Launch Vehicle". NASA Watch.)

In February 2011, it was reported that engine tests were largely complete and the vehicle aerodynamic design had completed two rounds of wind tunnel testing. A third and final round of tests was completed in late 2011 using a "1/60-scale supersonic wind tunnel model of Lynx."

In October 2014, XCOR claimed that flight tests of the Mark I prototype would start in 2015. (Note: "The Age of Space Flights is about to begin". FlyFighterJet.com. 2013-10-12.) By January 2016, however, technical hurdles led the company to state that they had not assigned a new projected date for test flights.

== Concept of operations ==
=== NASA sRLV program ===
In March 2011, XCOR submitted the Lynx as a reusable launch vehicle for carrying research payloads in response to NASA's suborbital reusable launch vehicle (sRLV) solicitation, which is a part of NASA's Flight Opportunities Program. (Note: "Space Technology Mission Directorate Flight Opportunities 2013 Annual Report" (PDF). NASA. p. 97.) No contract for providing this was ever announced.

=== Commercial operations ===
According to XCOR, the Lynx was intended to fly four or more times a day and would have also had the capacity to deliver payloads into space. The Lynx Mark I prototype was expected to perform its first test flight in 2015, (Note: Belfiore, Michael (2013-01-09). "Lynx Rocket Plane Readying for Summer Flight". moonandback.) followed by a flight of the Mark II production model twelve to eighteen months afterward.

XCOR had planned to have the Lynx's initial flights at the Mojave Air and Spaceport in Mojave, California (Note: "XCOR Unveils New Suborbital Rocketship". Space.com. 2008-03-26.) or any licensed spaceport with a 2,400-metre (7,900 ft) runway. Media reports in 2014 anticipated that, by the end of 2015 or in 2016, the Lynx was expected to begin flying suborbital space tourism flights and scientific research missions from a new spaceport on the Caribbean island of Curaçao. (Note: "Space Expedition Corporation Announces Wet Lease of XCOR Lynx Suborbital". Space-Travel.com (Press release). 2010-10-06.) However, the company stated in January 2016 that they had not assigned a new projected date for test flights and a date for the launch of commercial operations could not be anticipated.

Because it lacked any propulsion system other than its rocket engines, the Lynx would have to be towed to the end of the runway. Once positioned on the runway, the pilot would have ignited the four rocket engines, take off, and begin a steep climb. The engines will be shut off at approximately 138,000 feet (42 km) and Mach 2. The spaceplane would then continue to climb, unpowered until it reached an apogee of approximately 200,000 feet (61 km). The spacecraft would have experienced a little over four minutes of weightlessness before re-entering the Earth's atmosphere. The occupants of the Lynx were intended to have experienced up to four times normal gravity during re-entry. After re-entry, the Lynx would have glided down and performed an unpowered landing. The total flight time was projected to last about 30 minutes. The Lynx was expected to be able to perform 40 flights before maintenance was required.

Orbital Outfitters was reportedly designing pressure suits for XCOR use. (Note: "Commercial Spacesuit Companies Compete for Market Share". Parabolic Arc. 2011-03-21.) In 2012, Orbital Outfitters reported that they had completed a technical mockup of the Lynx craft itself.

=== Development cost projections ===
In 2008, Mark I production was projected to cost US$10 million (equivalent to US$15 million in 2025), (Note: Antczak, John (2008-03-27). "New rocket aims for space tourism market". NBC News.) and the Mark II around US$12 million (equivalent to US$18 million in 2025). (Note: Foust, Jeff (2008-03-31). "One size may not fit all". The Space Review.)

== See also ==
- Private spaceflight
- EADS Astrium Space Tourism Project
- Rocketplane XP
- SpaceShipTwo
- New Shepard
- XCOR EZ-Rocket
- XCOR Mark-I X-Racer
- Chino Roque
