= Schöckl =

Mountain in Styria, Austria

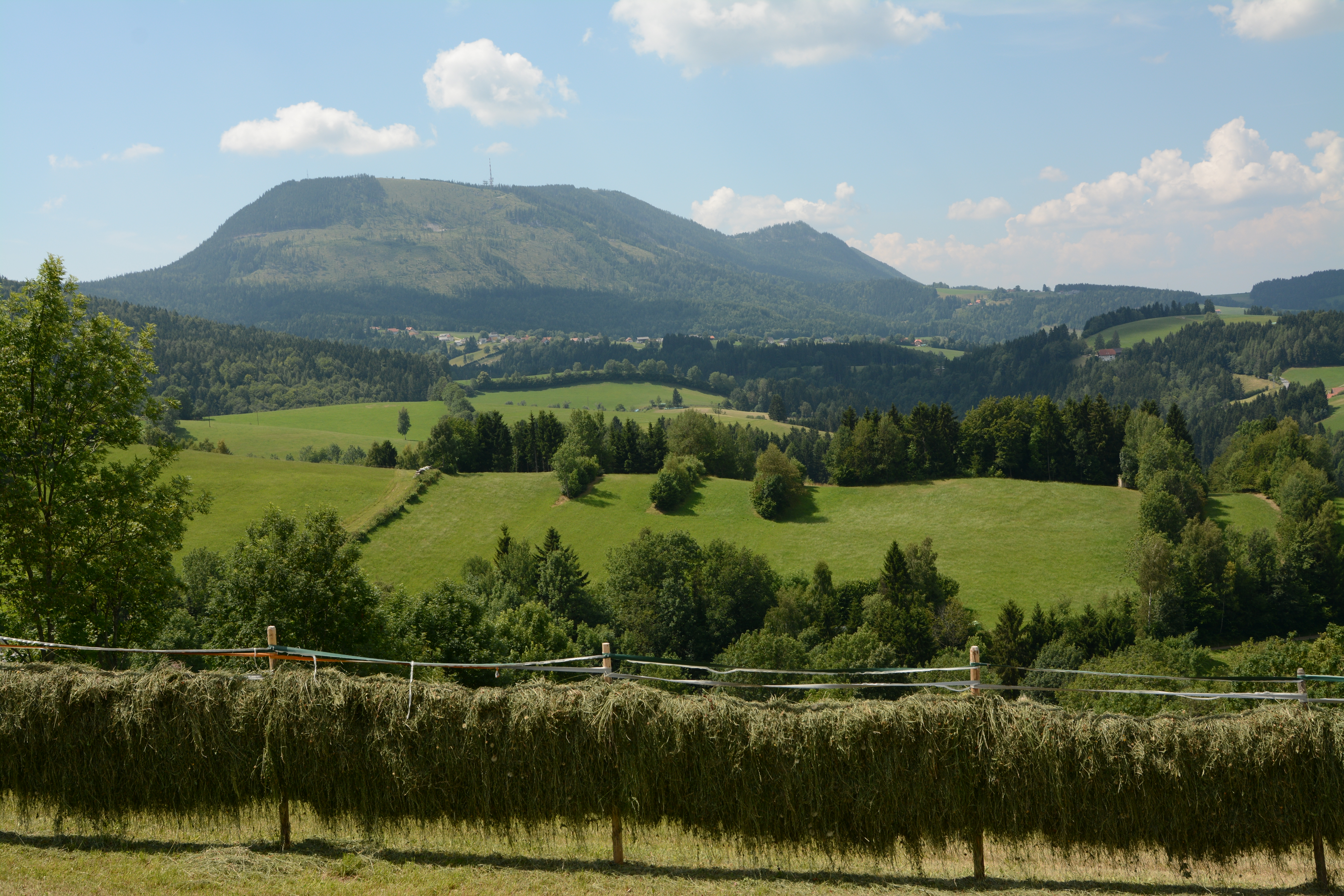
- Schöckl from the north-east

Highest point
- Elevation: 1,445 m (4,741 ft)
- Coordinates: 47°12′4″N 15°28′32″E

Geography
- Location within Austria
- Location: Styria, Austria
- Parent range: Prealps East of the Mur

Climbing
- Easiest route: hiking

Schöckl (also spelt Schöckel) is a mountain in the Austrian state of Styria. It is about 14 km north of the city center of Graz, the capital of Styria.

There is a cableway to the summit from the nearby health resort of St Radegund.

In 1931, the rocket designer Friedrich Schmiedl began a rocket mail service here, launching rockets to St Radegund.

Schöckl Transmitter is situated on the mountain.

== Climate ==
Climate data for Schöckl: 1443m (1991−2020 normals, 1971−2000 snowfall)
Month	Jan	Feb	Mar	Apr	May	Jun	Jul	Aug	Sep	Oct	Nov	Dec	Year
Record high °C (°F)	13.9 (57.0)	14.3 (57.7)	14.5 (58.1)	19.1 (66.4)	24.3 (75.7)	26.7 (80.1)	28.1 (82.6)	28.0 (82.4)	22.8 (73.0)	20.6 (69.1)	17.3 (63.1)	16.5 (61.7)	28.1 (82.6)
Mean daily maximum °C (°F)	−0.2 (31.6)	−0.2 (31.6)	2.7 (36.9)	7.5 (45.5)	11.5 (52.7)	15.0 (59.0)	16.5 (61.7)	16.6 (61.9)	12.0 (53.6)	7.9 (46.2)	4.2 (39.6)	0.6 (33.1)	7.8 (46.1)
Daily mean °C (°F)	−2.8 (27.0)	−2.8 (27.0)	−0.1 (31.8)	4.2 (39.6)	8.5 (47.3)	12.1 (53.8)	14.1 (57.4)	13.9 (57.0)	9.5 (49.1)	5.7 (42.3)	1.7 (35.1)	−1.8 (28.8)	5.2 (41.4)
Mean daily minimum °C (°F)	−5.2 (22.6)	−5.7 (21.7)	−2.9 (26.8)	0.9 (33.6)	5.0 (41.0)	8.4 (47.1)	10.0 (50.0)	10.4 (50.7)	6.5 (43.7)	2.8 (37.0)	−0.8 (30.6)	−4.2 (24.4)	2.1 (35.8)
Record low °C (°F)	−18.1 (−0.6)	−23.0 (−9.4)	−18.3 (−0.9)	−12.6 (9.3)	−4.1 (24.6)	−1.1 (30.0)	2.2 (36.0)	0.4 (32.7)	−1.7 (28.9)	−11.0 (12.2)	−15.2 (4.6)	−21.4 (−6.5)	−23.0 (−9.4)
Average precipitation mm (inches)	21.6 (0.85)	30.2 (1.19)	41.4 (1.63)	59.1 (2.33)	98.5 (3.88)	133.9 (5.27)	134.8 (5.31)	142.8 (5.62)	100.3 (3.95)	71.2 (2.80)	54.9 (2.16)	39.6 (1.56)	928.3 (36.55)
Average snowfall cm (inches)	14.6 (5.7)	25.1 (9.9)	19.7 (7.8)	11.4 (4.5)	3.4 (1.3)	0.0 (0.0)	0.0 (0.0)	0.0 (0.0)	0.0 (0.0)	1.4 (0.6)	11.1 (4.4)	13.9 (5.5)	100.6 (39.7)
Source: Central Institute for Meteorology and Geodynamics
