= Stephen Smith (aerospace engineer) =

Indian aerospace engineer

Stephen H. Smith
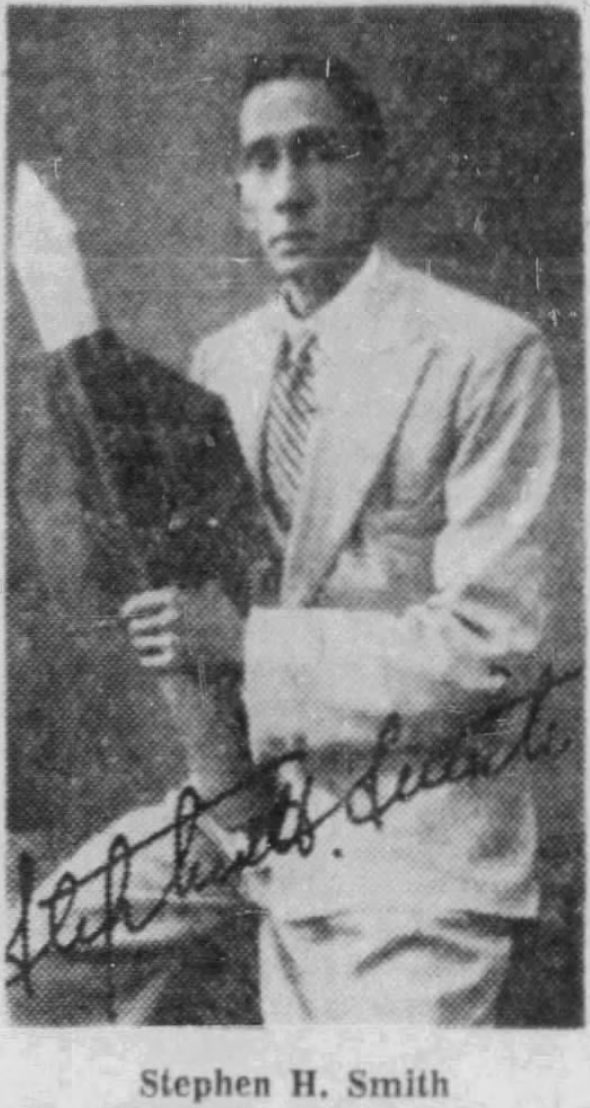
- Born: 14 February 1891; Shillong, Meghalaya (then in Assam)
- Died: 15 February 1951 (aged 60); Calcutta, West Bengal, India
- Burial place: Lower circular Road cemetery, Kolkata
- Citizenship: Indian
- Education: St. Patrick's High School; College of Physicians and Surgeons of Bengal
- Occupation: Dentist
- Employer(s): Calcutta Customs; Calcutta Police
- Known for: Pioneered Aerophilately in India
- Spouse: Fay Harcourt (m. 1918)
- Children: Hector Smith
- Father: William Batt Smith

Stephen Hector Taylor-Smith (14 February 1891 – 15 February 1951) often known as Stephen Smith, was a pioneering Indian aerospace engineer who developed techniques in delivering mail by rocket.

Unlike Friedrich Schmiedl, whom the Austrian Authorities banned from further experimenting, Smith was encouraged in his experiments by Indian Officials. In the ten-year span of his experiments (1934–1944), Smith made some 270 launches, including at least 80 rocket mail flights.

== Early life ==
He was born on 14 February at Strawberry Hill, in Shillong, Assam. As a boy, along with other schoolmates Smith attempted to transport live garden lizards in rockets over the swimming pool of St. Patrick's School, Asansol. He attended St. Patrick's from 1903 to 1911. Smith was the first rocket experimenter to successfully transport foodstuff, medicine and livestock via rockets.

Smith worked as a customs official, a policeman and a dentist. He became the Secretary of the Indian Airmail Society, and combined his work with his interest in rocketry. His first launch was on 30 September 1934, experimenting with 270 more by 4 December 1944. 80 of these contained mail, and his achievements include the first successful rocket mail sent over a river and the first rocket to carry a parcel.

== Mail rockets ==
On 30 September 1934, he launched his first mail rocket, using a rocket made locally by the Orient Firework Company of Calcutta. The flight was a ship-to-shore launch, The rocket carrying 143 covers, left the D.V. Pansy and exploded mid-air scattering the mail over the sea. 140 covers were recovered and taken to the Sagar Lighthouse, where the keeper postmarked the mail. This was followed by: shore-to-ship, night, and miniature newspaper flights.

Smith's flights in Sikkim, a British Protectorate in the eastern Himalayas, received official sanction from ruler of Sikkim, Tashi Namgyal. Here he carried out 20 successful rocket experiments and achieved the first rocket parcel mail. The Oriental Fireworks Company supplied Smith with 16 rockets between 23 March 1935 and 29 June 1935. Between them, these "Silver Jubilee" flights carried over a thousand covers.

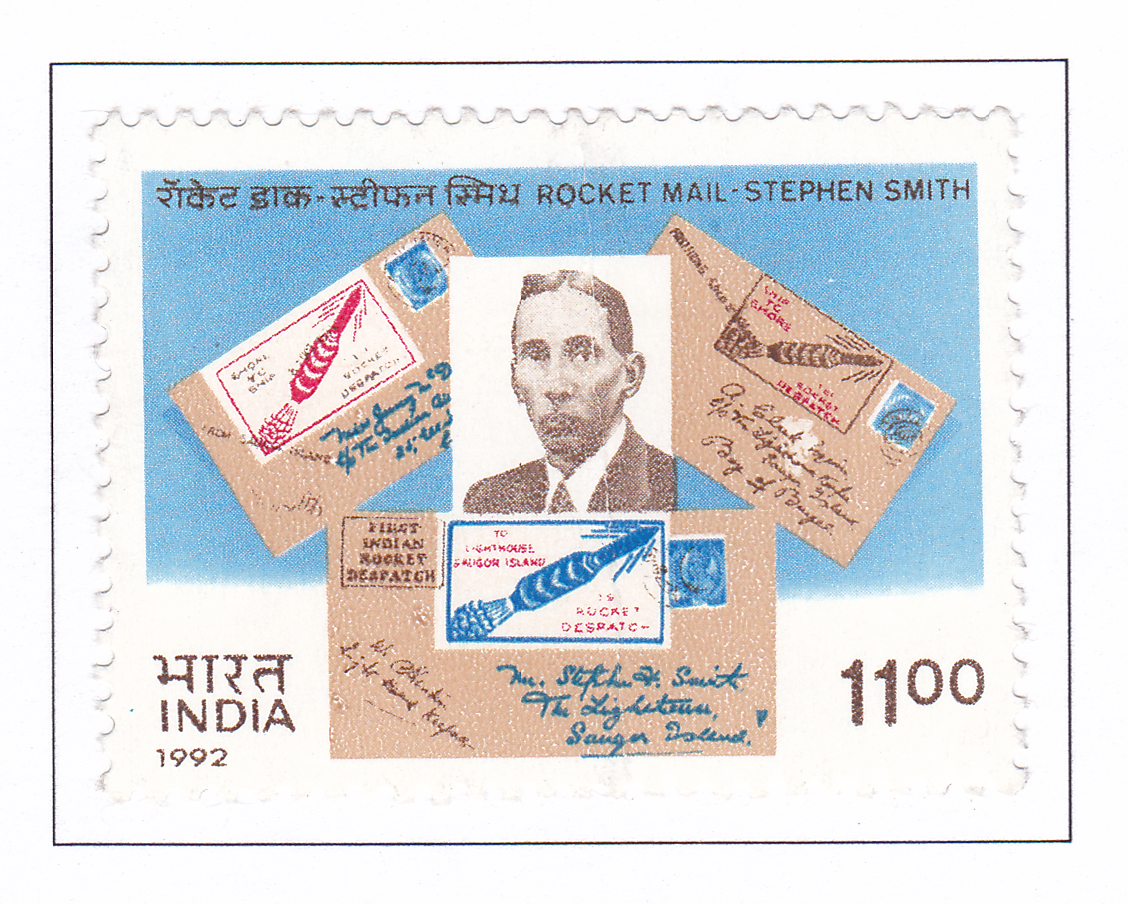
"Rocket Mail-Stephan Smith" commemorative stamp issued on 19 December 1992

Smith made history once again, when he used his rockets to carry a food package across a river to the Quetta region, which had suffered an earthquake. The package contained: rice, grain, spices, biris (Indian cigarettes) and 150 rocketgrams.

== Achievements ==
Stephen Smith also effected the world's first livestock transport when on 29 June 1935, a rocket carried a cock and hen together with 189 rocketgrams across the river Damodar. Both animals survived the flight and were donated to a private zoo in Calcutta. A later effort, successfully carried; a snake (Miss Creepy), an apple and 106 covers. Smith demonstrated his experiments during the war years, few items of mail were carried on these flights, The last series of rockets were gas propelled and the last flight took place on 4 December 1944.

Smith died on 15 February 1951. He is known as the "Father of Aerophilately" in India. The Department of Posts in India issued a commemorative stamp on 19 December 1992 honouring this Anglo-Indian pioneer of airborne mail.

== Publications ==
List of books published as author.

- 1926: Indian Airways Part I
- 1927: Indian Airways Part II
- 1930: Indian Airways Part III
- 1927: The World Flyer's Danger Zone
- 1955: Rocket mail catalogue and historical survey of first experiments in Rocketry
- 1980: From the diary of Stephen Smith compiled by Deoki Nandan Jatia for the Philatelic Congress of India.
