= Rocket mail =

Mail delivery by rockets or missiles

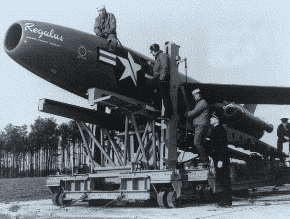
The rocket-launched SSM-N-8 Regulus cruise missile was used for one attempt to deliver mail.

Rocket mail is the delivery of mail by rocket or missile. The rocket lands by deploying an internal parachute upon arrival. It has been attempted by various organizations in many countries, with varying levels of success. It has never become widely seen as being a viable option for delivering mail, due to the cost of the schemes and numerous failures.

The collection of philatelic material ("stamps") used for (and depicting) rocket mail is part of a specialist branch of aerophilately known as astrophilately.

== Pioneers ==
German author Heinrich von Kleist was the first to suggest using rockets to deliver mail. While editor of the Berliner Abendblätter, he wrote an article published on 12 October 1810 which proposed using fixed artillery batteries to fire shells filled with letters to predetermined landing locations of soft ground. Kleist calculated that a network of batteries could transmit a letter from Berlin to Breslau, 290 kilometres (180 miles) away, in half a day. Later in the 19th century, Congreve rockets were used to deliver mail in Tonga, but the missiles were unreliable. Hermann Oberth suggested using rockets for mail in a 1927 letter, and he lectured on the topic at a meeting of the Deutsche Gesellschaft für Luft- und Raumfahrt in June 1928. The lecture caused many experimentalists to expect the use of rockets for mail as inevitable, and by 1929 Jacob Gould Schurman, the United States ambassador to Germany, discussed the legalities of transatlantic rocket mail with a German reporter.

Friedrich Schmiedl launched the first rocket mail (V-7, Experimental Rocket 7) with 102 pieces of mail between the Austrian towns of Schöckl and St. Radegund. Several other launches by Schmiedl occurred through 1932, and similar experiments occurred in several other countries, usually subsidized by philatelists.

Gerhard Zucker experimented in the 1930s with powder rockets similar to fireworks. Between 1931 and 1933, he travelled throughout Germany displaying his rocket and claiming that it could be used to deliver mail. After moving to the United Kingdom, Zucker tried to convince the General Post Office that postal delivery by rocket was viable. After initial demonstrations on the Sussex Downs in southern England, a rocket was launched on 28 July 1934, and a second on 31 July, over a 1600-metre flight path between the Hebridean islands of Harris and Scarp in Scotland. Around 1.07 m long with a diameter of 18 cm, the rocket fuselages were packed with 1,200 envelopes. Both rockets exploded, though most of the smaller second cargo, which included survivors of the first flight, was saved.

Stephen Smith, a Secretary of the Indian Airmail Society, combined his work with his interest in rocketry. His first launch was on 30 September 1934, and he experimented with 270 more by 4 December 1944. 80 of these contained mail, and his achievements include the first successful rocket mail sent over a river and the first rocket to carry a parcel. The Oriental Fireworks Company supplied Smith with 16 rockets between 23 March 1935 and 29 June 1935. Between them, these "Silver Jubilee" flights carried over a thousand event covers. In 1992 the Indian government issued a stamp to celebrate the centenary of Smith's birth, calling him "the originator of rocket mail in India".

== United States ==
One of the first successful deliveries of mail by a rocket in the United States was made on 23 February 1936, when two rocket airplanes that were launched from the New York side of the frozen Greenwood Lake landed on the New Jersey side, less than 100 yards away. This event was preceded by several other successful rocket mail experiments in the early 1930s.

During the mid-1950s, "amateur" rocketeers flew a number of zinc dust / sulfur "micrograin" solid propellant mail-carrying rockets interstate, from California, across the Colorado River, and into Arizona. The postal covers were printed for each occasion, and franked at the nearest destination post office.

In 1959 the U.S. Navy submarine USS Barbero assisted the Post Office Department, predecessor to the United States Postal Service (USPS), in its search for faster mail transportation, with the only delivery of "Missile Mail". On 8 June 1959, Barbero fired a Regulus cruise missile – its nuclear warhead having earlier been replaced by two Post Office Department mail containers – targeted at the Naval Auxiliary Air Station at Naval Station Mayport in Florida. The Regulus cruise missile was launched with a pair of Aerojet-General 3KS-33,000 solid-rocket boosters. A turbojet engine sustained the long-range cruise flight after the boosters were dropped. Twenty-two minutes after launch, the missile arrived at Mayport and landed safely.

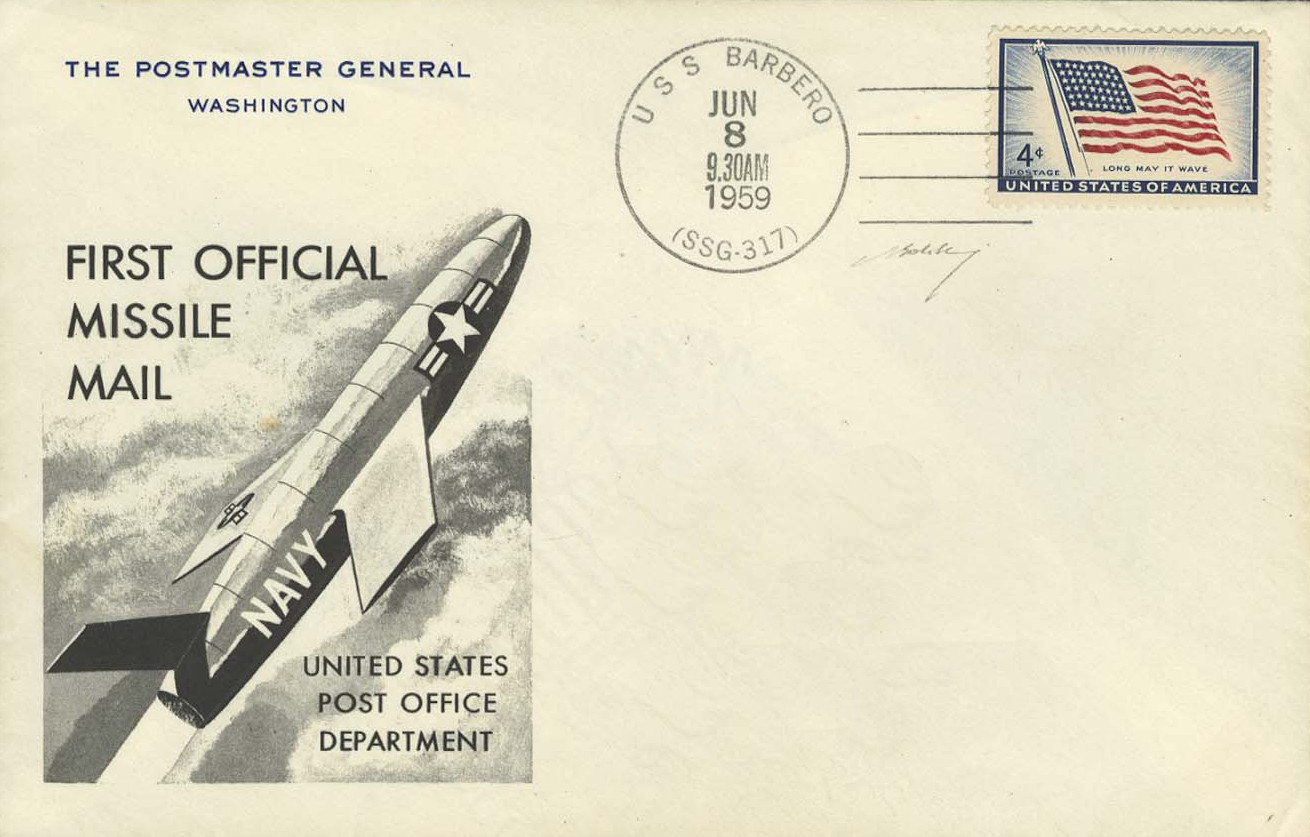
USS Barbero first day commemorative cover. The return address is the Postmaster General.

The POD had officially established a branch post office on Barbero and delivered some 3000 pieces of mail to it before Barbero left Norfolk, Virginia. The mail consisted entirely of commemorative postal covers addressed to President of the United States Dwight Eisenhower, other government officials, the Postmasters General of all members of the Universal Postal Union, and so on, from United States Postmaster General Arthur E. Summerfield. Their postage (four cents domestic, eight cents international) had been cancelled "USS Barbero Jun 8 9.30am 1959" before the submarine put to sea. At Mayport, the Regulus missile was opened and the mail forwarded to the post office in Jacksonville, Florida, for sorting and routing.

Upon witnessing the missile's landing, Summerfield stated, "This peacetime employment of a guided missile for the important and practical purpose of carrying mail, is the first known official use of missiles by any Post Office Department of any nation." Summerfield proclaimed the event to be "of historic significance to the peoples of the entire world", and predicted that "before man reaches the moon, mail will be delivered within hours from New York to California, to Britain, to India or Australia by guided missiles. We stand on the threshold of rocket mail."

Despite the Postmaster General's enthusiasm, the Department of Defense saw the measure more as a demonstration of U.S. missile capabilities. Experts believe that the cost of using missile mail could never be justified. While during the 1920s a letter between Europe and the United States would not arrive for at least a week after mailing, by the 1950s air mail crossed the Atlantic Ocean in as little as one day.

One of the mail containers which was on board the Regulus missile fired by Barbero is in the collection of the United States Submarine Force Museum in Groton, Connecticut.

== Reusable launch vehicles ==
Rocket expert Willy Ley speculated in 1954 that using small cruise missiles to rapidly deliver mail might be possible for as little as three times the rate for airmail, in part because they could be reusable. Technologists like Robert Zubrin, of Mars Society fame, think that rocket mail, or at least ultra-elite business package delivery, may become commercially viable with the development of fully reusable launch systems, particularly single-stage to orbit vehicles. Such systems would allow package delivery anywhere in the world in 30–45 minutes. This idea has been forwarded by Zubrin and was the original business plan behind Pioneer Rocketplane (later Rocketplane Limited, Inc.), which he co-founded. Zubrin has since left the company, which is now focused on pursuing a somewhat more conventional space tourism strategy. The potential of package delivery with reusable launch vehicles is discussed in Zubrin's book Entering Space: Creating a Spacefaring Civilization.

On 3 December 2005, XCOR Aerospace flew its EZ-Rocket (a rocket-powered Long-EZ aircraft the company built as a demonstrator for its reusable rocket engines) from Mojave, California, to California City, California, both in Kern County. Test pilot Dick Rutan made the flight, which lasted about 9 minutes and carried US mail from the post office in Mojave to addresses in California City. This was the first time that a crewed, rocket-powered aircraft was used to carry U.S. Mail.

== In popular culture ==
A surplus mail rocket is used to reach the Moon in Robert Heinlein's Rocket Ship Galileo (1947).

Mail is delivered by rocket in an early chapter of Gravity's Rainbow by Thomas Pynchon (1973). The character Pirate Prentice receives orders this way.

RocketMail was the name for one of the first major, free webmail services. For a brief time, RocketMail battled with Hotmail for the number-one spot among free webmail services. Yahoo! acquired RocketMail in 1997, and assimilated it into Yahoo! Mail.

Ethan Hunt's computerized sunglasses (for a mission briefing) are delivered by a missile with a ground-piercing spike on the nose, fired from a shoulder-mounted tube, at the start of the 2000 film Mission: Impossible 2.

Gerhard Zucker's Scottish rocket mail was depicted in the 2004 film The Rocket Post.

Bill Bryson mentions missile mail in his 2006 memoir The Life and Times of the Thunderbolt Kid.

== See also ==
- Astrophilately
