= Himachal Som =

Indian diplomat (d. 2013)

Himachal Som (died 26 November 2013) was an Indian diplomat. He was an Indian Foreign Service officer of 1970 Cadre and retired as the Indian Ambassador to Italy and the Permanent Representative to various United Nations bodies in Europe.

== Life ==
Som was born in West Bengal. He went to St. Patrick's School, Asansol, Asansol and did his Bachelor's from Presidency College, Kolkata.

Som was married to Reba Som, an academic, historian, writer and classical singer from India. She is the director of Indian Council for Cultural Relations, Rabindranath Tagore Centre in Kolkata. She is also a trained singer of Rabindrasangeet.

He had two sons, Vishnu Som, a television journalist and news anchor for NDTV, and Abhishek Som, an investment banker.

He loved cooking and said that it is a great diplomatic tool.
