= Kristine Atienza =

- Born: 1991 or 1992 (age 33–34); Bataan, Philippines
- Education: University of the Philippines Diliman
- Space career
- Current occupation: Nutritionist
- Selection: HI-SEAS Ka Lā Hiki Ola crew (2023)

Kristine Jane Atienza is a Filipina nutritionist who is known for being the first analog astronaut from the Philippines by taking part at the HI-SEAS mission at Mauna Loa, Hawaii in November 2023.

== Early life and education ==
Kristine Jane Atienza was born in Bataan in 1991 or 1992. She has been interested in astronomy since her pre-school years with her childhood dream being to become an astronomer.

Atienza was admitted to the University of the Philippines Diliman to pursue a degree in applied physics. However due to issues in fulfilling academic requirements on mathematics, she shifted and pursued a degree in community nutrition instead. Nevertheless remained active in the astronomy community. She is also a member of the UP Astronomical Society, a student organization.

Atienza became a registered nutritionist. She worked as a volunteer for an international humanitarian agency in the public health field.

== Space career ==
=== Early years ===
Atienza through her network in Southeast Asia and Europe remained involved in the astronomy community. In 2021, Atienza and other people from other countries formed the Astronaut Nutrition in Isolated Confined Extreme Environments. Her involvement in the field of space nutrition led to her learning about human analog missions. She decided to pursue the role of an analog astronaut in 2022.

Atienza got accepted to the LunAres Research Station in Poland. But she had to decline since the weeks long mission conflicts with her work schedule. She fulfilled the role as LunAres' investigator instead.

=== HI-SEAS analog mission ===
Atienza received an invite to apply for the Hawai‘i Space Exploration Analog and Simulation (HI-SEAS) in July 2023. She was accepted to take part in a mission after taking psychological and cognitive tests. The six-day mission took place in November 2023 in Mauna Loa, Hawaii and Atienza became the first Filipina analog astronaut. She was the nutritionist of the five-person crew which simulated a Mars human mission.

=== Blue Origin sub-orbital flight bid ===
Atienza is making a bid to get included in a six-person crew sub-orbital flight on board Blue Origin's New Shepard. As of September 2025, this flight includes four crew members from India, Brazil, Thailand, and Nigeria with two seats yet to be filled. In March 2025, Atienza took a centrifuge training which certifies her to board a Virgin Galactic suborbital flight.

== See also ==
- Chino Roque, Filipino astronaut candidate
