= Jeff Greason =

Founder of XCOR Aerospace

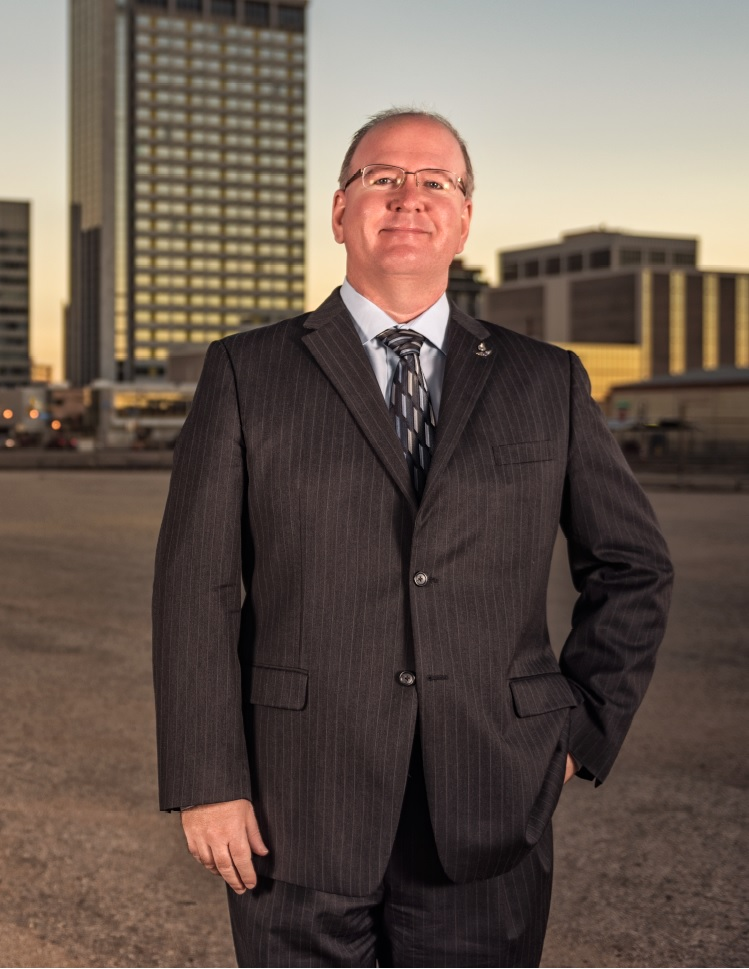
- Education: California Institute of Technology
- Known for: XCOR Aerospace, Agile Aero

Jeff Greason is a co-founder and the Chief Technologist of Electric Sky, a company developing the ability to wirelessly transmit power to moving vehicles. He also serves as chairman of the board of the Tau Zero Foundation.

== Career ==
Greason has been active in the development of the regulatory environment for the commercial space flight industry. He has worked with the FAA's Office of Commercial Space Transportation (AST) since 1998, has served on the advisory group to AST, COMSTAC as a member of the working group on reusable launch vehicles (RLV) since 2000, and as an invited full member of COMSTAC since 2005. He was one of the leaders of the development of the Commercial Space Launch Amendment Act of 2004. He co-founded the Commercial Spaceflight Federation (formerly Personal Spaceflight Federation).

Previously, he was the team lead at Rotary Rocket for engine development, and earlier worked at Intel.

Greason was named a member of the Review of United States Human Space Flight Plans Committee on May 7, 2009. Since then he has given a number of speeches on space policy and space settlement.

In July 2003, Greason testified before the joint House/Senate subcommittee hearings on Commercial Human Spaceflight that addressed the transition from aircraft regulation to launch vehicle regulation for suborbital vehicles.

He is one of the founders of XCOR Aerospace and was its CEO from 1999 through February 2015, after which he served as chief technologist. In November 2015 Greason left XCOR with two other founders to form Agile Aero. He was a member of the XCOR board of directors until he resigned in March 2016 and no longer has any connection with XCOR Aerospace. In 2017, XCOR Aerospace went out of business after bankruptcy.

From November 2015 through July 2019 he served as CEO of Agile Aero, a company developing rapid prototyping capabilities for aerospace vehicles, which has since been acquired by Electric Sky.

He publishes occasional articles explaining space issues at the Tau Zero Foundation blog. An article summarizing the field of interstellar propulsion and the work of the Tau Zero Foundation cites him.

In May 2019 he authored an article on a new approach to space propulsion, exchanging momentum with surrounding space plasma such as the solar wind or interstellar medium to expel reaction mass while retaining the kinetic energy, to accelerate a vehicle.

Starting in the summer of 2020, Greason teaches an online course through the Kepler Space Institute on advanced space propulsion.

== Honors and patents ==
Time magazine named Greason an Inventor of the Year in 2002 for his team's work on the EZ-Rocket rocketplane. Greason holds 28 U.S. patents.
