= Chino Roque =

Candidate to be the first Filipino in space

- Born: Daniel Angelo Roque; 1990 or 1991 (age 34–35)
- Education: De La Salle University
- Space career
- Previous occupation: CrossFit Coach, Commercial Pilot
- Selection: Axe Apollo Space Academy
- Missions: XCOR Lynx

Daniel Angelo Roque (born 1990/1991), also known as Chino Roque, was one of the 23 space cadets selected from more than 28,000 Filipino candidates by the Axe Apollo Space Academy in 2013 to fly to space with XCOR Lynx. He would have been considered the first Filipino astronaut had the sub-orbital spaceflight taken place; however, the flight never occurred after XCOR Aerospace, the company building the Lynx spacecraft, declared bankruptcy in 2017.

== Early life and career ==
Chino Roque was born in 1990 or 1991. He finished elementary and secondary education at De La Salle Santiago Zobel School and obtained a bachelor's degree in psychology at De La Salle University in 2013. He captained the men's futbol team from 2010 to 2012. After graduation, he gained experience as a student pilot and obtained a commercial pilot's license at the Omni Aviation Corporation in Clark Freeport and Special Economic Zone, Pampanga. He owns Central Ground CrossFit in Bonifacio Global City, Taguig, where he also works as a CrossFit trainer.

== Selection as astronaut ==
In 2013, after weeks of physical challenges and aptitude tests conducted by the Axe Apollo Space Academy at the Kennedy Space Center, Roque emerged as the representative of the Philippines. Roque also aced a series of scuba and obstacle course training at the Axe Apollo Space Academy in Florida. Roque endured the zero gravity aircraft, the centrifuge, and was granted a co-pilot experience in a fighter jet where he states he was able to barrel roll and snap roll with a Marchetti.

Buzz Aldrin, one of the American astronauts who conducted the first Moon landing in 1969, served as the selection committee chairman of the program. Roque revealed that he would bring three items to the planned space flight: the Filipino flag, a rosary, and a photograph.

While the proposed sub-orbital spaceflight was scheduled to be completed sometime between 2014 and 2015, no flight has been conducted with the proposed XCOR Lynx to date. This has been connected with the declared bankruptcy of XCOR Aerospace in 2017, the company sponsoring the vehicle to be used by the Axe Apollo Space Academy.

== See also ==
- Kristine Atienza, Filipina analog astronaut
