= Friedrich Schmiedl =

Friedrich Schmiedl (11 May 1902 – 11 September 1994) was an Austrian rocket designer; known particularly for his development of rocket mail.

== Rocket mail ==
Schmiedl was born in Schwertberg in Upper Austria, and from 1924 studied civil engineering at the Technische Hochschule in Graz.

He began experiments with solid-fuel rockets in 1918. From 1924 the experiments took place at Schöckl, a mountain about 15 km north of Graz.

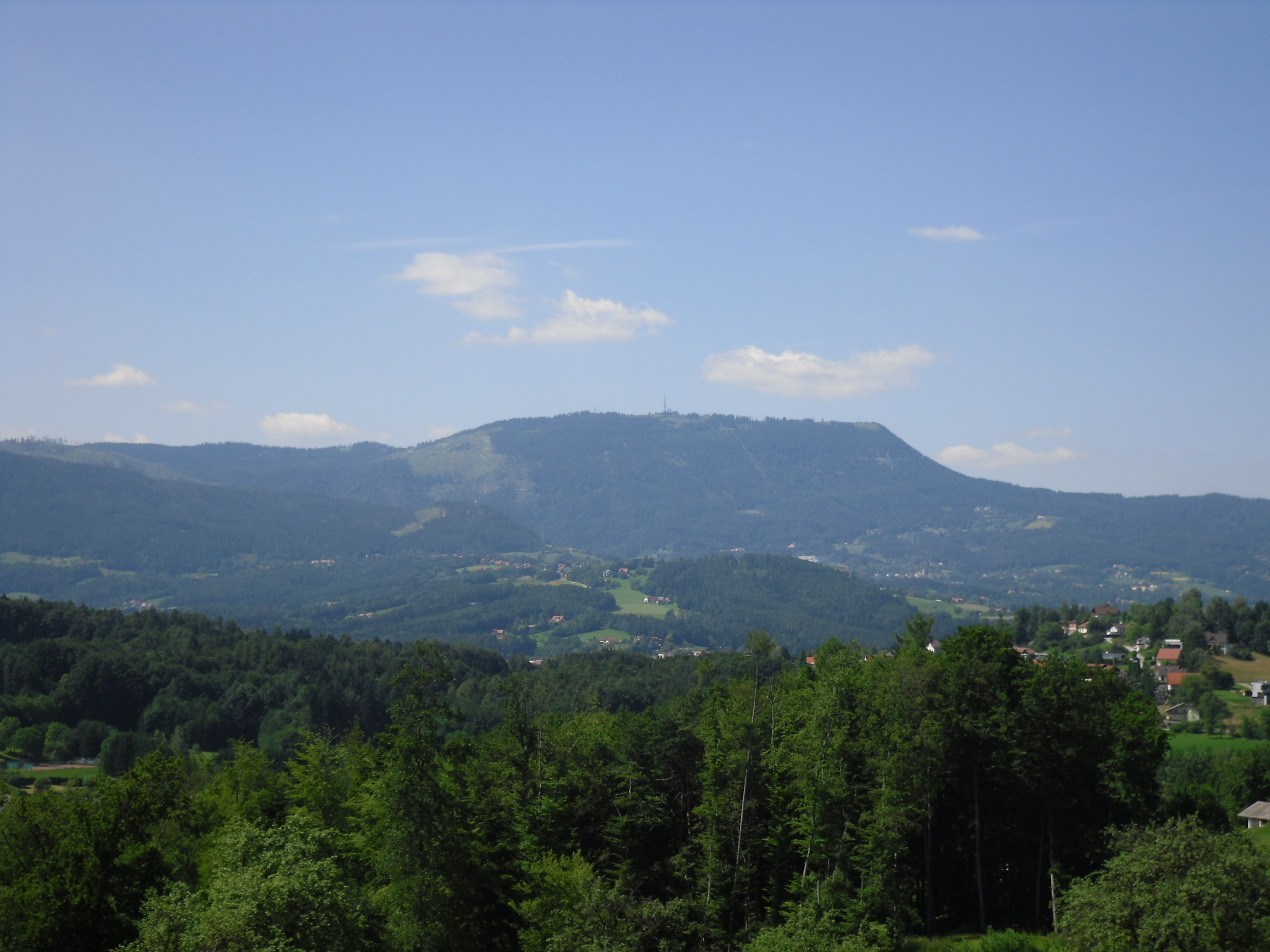
Schöckl, where Schmiedl's rockets were launched

On 2 February 1931 he launched a rocket from Schöckl, which contained 102 letters. It was operated by remote control and landed by parachute at St Radegund, a village about 3 km away. More successful launches were subsequently made, to St Radegund and to Kumberg, a village about 6 km away. Philatelists became interested in collecting letters which had been sent by rocket. Schmiedl envisaged that mail could be sent between towns by rocket; however the Austrian Post Office was not persuaded.

He also worked on rockets used to collect meteorological data, and rockets for aerial photography.

The rocket mail launches eventually had to be discontinued: they were mostly financed by special postage stamps, and in 1934 the Austrian Post Office forbade this financing; in 1935 the Austrian government forbade the possession of explosives, so private rocket development could no longer be carried out.

== Second World War and after ==
When the Second World War began, there was military interest in his work; however Schmiedl, not wishing his research to be used for military purposes, destroyed the research documents. After the war he declined an offer to work on rocket development in the USA. Staying in Austria, he worked on boat propulsion.

Friedrich Schmiedl died in Graz in 1994. His bequest to the City of Graz was used to establish the Friedrich Schmiedl Foundation, to support new ideas to improve communications in the region of Graz.
