= Schöckl Transmitter =

Coordinates: 47°11′58″N 15°27′48″E

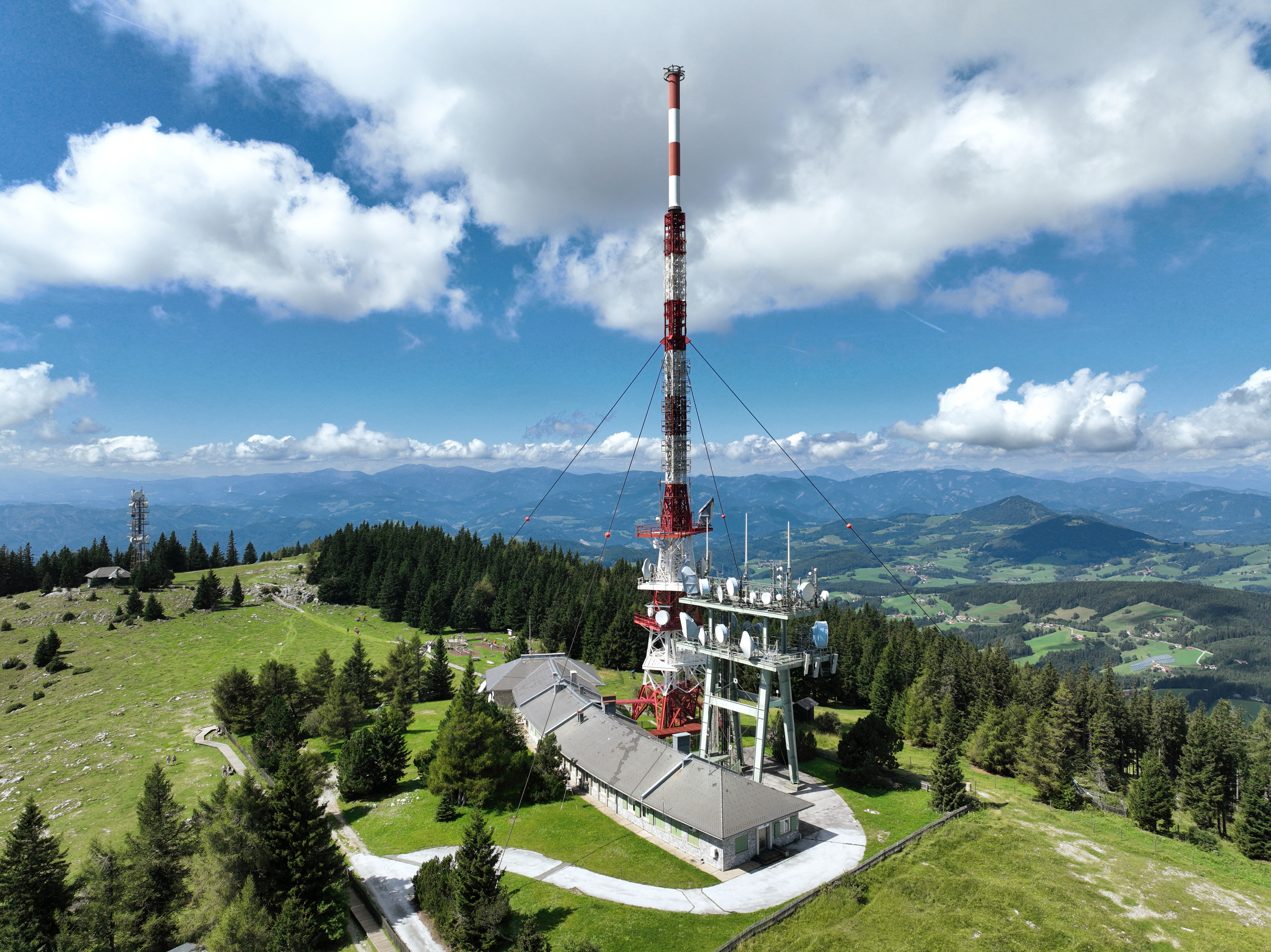
Schöckl Transmitter

Schöckl Transmitter is a facility for FM- and TV-transmission on the Schöckl Mountain in Steiermark, Austria. It uses as an antenna tower, a 100-metre-high lattice tower, which was built in 1956.

The tower of Schöckl transmitter was originally completely free-standing, but it was in recent times additionally guyed.
