= Vishnu Som =

Indian news anchor and journalist

- Born: July, 1974; Copenhagen, Denmark
- Education: M.A. in Communication and Media Studies, Carleton University
- Occupation: Journalist News Anchor
- Years active: 2001–present
- Employer: Executive Editor NDTV (2001-Present)
- Notable credit(s): Left, Right and Center
- Awards: Indian Telly Awards; Commonwealth Broadcasting Awards; ENBA Award; Ramnath Goenka Award

Vishnu Som (born July 1974 in Copenhagen, Denmark) is an Indian news anchor and journalist. He is the Executive Editor and Principal Anchor with New Delhi Television (NDTV), India's first 24-hour news network. Som reported extensively on war, environment, conflict, aviation and natural disasters. He has covered, in person, the Kargil (North Kashmir), Afghanistan, Iraq and 2022 Russo-Ukrainian wars as well as the 2004 Asian tsunami, 2001 Bhuj (Gujarat, India) earthquake and the 2011 Japan earthquake and tsunami (for which he was awarded for his coverage). In April 2012, he was awarded the best Television Presenter in India by the News Television Awards.

== Early life and education ==
Som's father Himachal Som was an IFS (Indian Foreign Service) officer and former Indian Ambassador to Italy and his mother Reba is an academic, historian, writer and classical singer from India.

Som studied at St. Paul's School, Darjeeling. He then completed his Bachelor of Arts degree in History & Political Science (1994), and Master's in Communications and Media Studies (1996) from Carleton University in Ottawa, Canada.

Som has completed a multi-part documentary series called Great Battles, on the role of Indian soldiers in some of the greatest battles of the last century, from Monte Cassino in the Second World War to the Siachen high altitude conflict. His documentary series, India's Underwater Treasures, which looked at the impact of global warming on India's coral formations, won the best series award at the Indian Telly Awards, 2008 and a special commendation at the Commonwealth Broadcasting Awards.

== Career ==
Som anchors Left, Right and Centre at 9pm and the 10 pm news on NDTV. He has conducted one-on-one interviews with international leaders such as President Vladimir Putin, Prime Minister Shinzō Abe, US Secretary of Defence Ashton Carter, Bill Gates and Henry Kissinger among others.

== Awards ==
His work has been recognised both in India and abroad through awards including the Ramnath Goenka Award, the Commonwealth Broadcasting Award and the Indian Telly awards.
