= Reba Som =

Indian historian

Dr. Reba Som (born, Darjeeling, West Bengal) is an academic, historian, writer and classical singer from India. She was the director of Indian Council for Cultural Relations' Rabindranath Tagore Centre in Kolkata from 2008 to 2013.

Reba Som is also a trained singer of Rabindrasangeet and songs of Kazi Nazrul Islam. Her compact discs, "Selected Songs of Rabindranath Tagore" (III Millenneo, Rome, Italy 2003 and Saregama – India, May 2004) and "Love Songs of Kazi Nazrul Islam" (Times Music, 2016) include her English translations of the lyrics.

== Personal life ==
Married to Indian Foreign Service officer Himachal Som in 1971, Reba has travelled all over the world on postings that include Brazil, Denmark, Pakistan, United States, Bangladesh, Canada, Laos, Italy amongst others. Rome was the last posting where her husband was India's Ambassador. She has two sons Vishnu Som, one of India's leading television journalist and news anchor and Abhishek Som, a U.S. based investment banker.

== Works ==
- Som Reba, (2017) Margot:Sister Nivedita of Vivekananda, Penguin Random House, Delhi, ISBN 978-0-670-08879-9
- Som, Reba (1995). Differences within Consensus: The Left-Right Divide in the Congress 1929-39. New Delhi, India: Orient Longman. ISBN 81-250-0409-2.
- Som, Reba (2004). Gandhi, Nehru and Bose: The Making of the Modern Indian Mind. New Delhi, India: Penguin Books (Viking). ISBN 978-0-670-05800-6.
- Som, Reba (February 1994). Jawaharlal Nehru and the Hindu Code Bill – Victory of Symbol over Substance?. Cambridge, United Kingdom: Modern Asian Studies, Vol. 28, Part 1.
- Som, Reba (2009). Rabindranath Tagore: The Singer and his Song. New Delhi, India: Penguin Books (Viking). ISBN 978-0-670-08248-3.
- Som, Reba (2002). Subhas Chandra Bose and the Resolution of the Women's Question. New Delhi, India: Centre for Women's Development Studies.
