= XCOR EZ-Rocket =

American experimental rocket aircraft

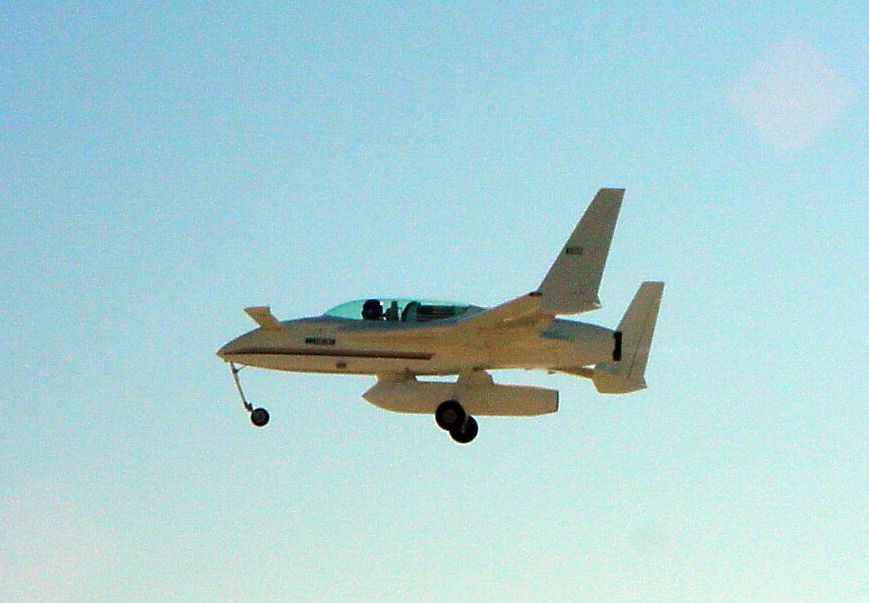
EZ-Rocket one week after its first flight

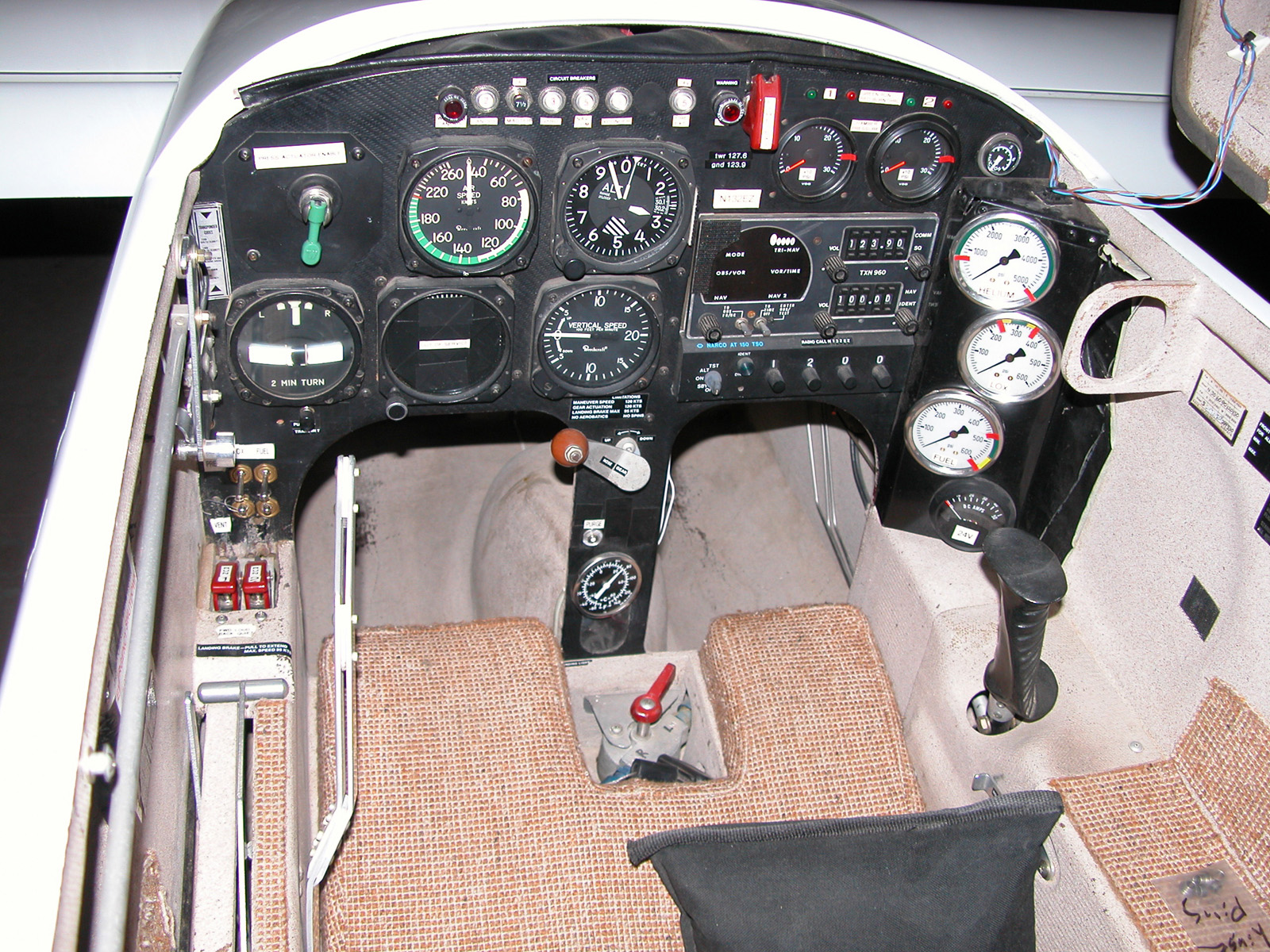
Cockpit. Engine on-off switches on left side panel are placarded "FWD - LOUD; BACK - QUIET"

The XCOR EZ-Rocket was a test platform for the XCOR XR-4A3 rocket propulsion system. The airplane was a modified Rutan Long-EZ, with the propeller replaced by first one, then later a pair of pressure-fed regeneratively cooled liquid-fueled rocket engines and an underslung fuel tank. The engines were restartable in flight, and were contained within Kevlar armor shielding. The EZ-Rocket was registered as an experimental aircraft.

== Development and history ==
The first flight took place on July 21, 2001, flown by test pilot Dick Rutan.

On a typical flight, the EZ-Rocket took off on rockets, gained altitude for a minute or so, then switched off the rockets and glided to a dead stick landing.

The vehicle actually flew better during dead stick landings than a standard Long-EZ due to lack of drag from a stationary pusher propeller — the vehicle's aerodynamics were cleaner in spite of its belly tank. It was also lighter due to the lack of a piston engine (the rocket propulsion system was significantly lighter), so enjoyed significantly lower wing loading than a standard Long-EZ.

When XCOR began flying its EZ-Rocket in 2001, the company decided to have it FAA certified as an experimental aircraft, avoiding the additional time required to seek a launch vehicle license from the Office of Commercial Space Transportation (AST). Jeff Greason, a co-founder of XCOR, said on February 10, 2003 if they were starting out at that time they probably would seek an AST license due to the progress made in developing a regulatory regime for suborbitals.

== Milestones and records ==
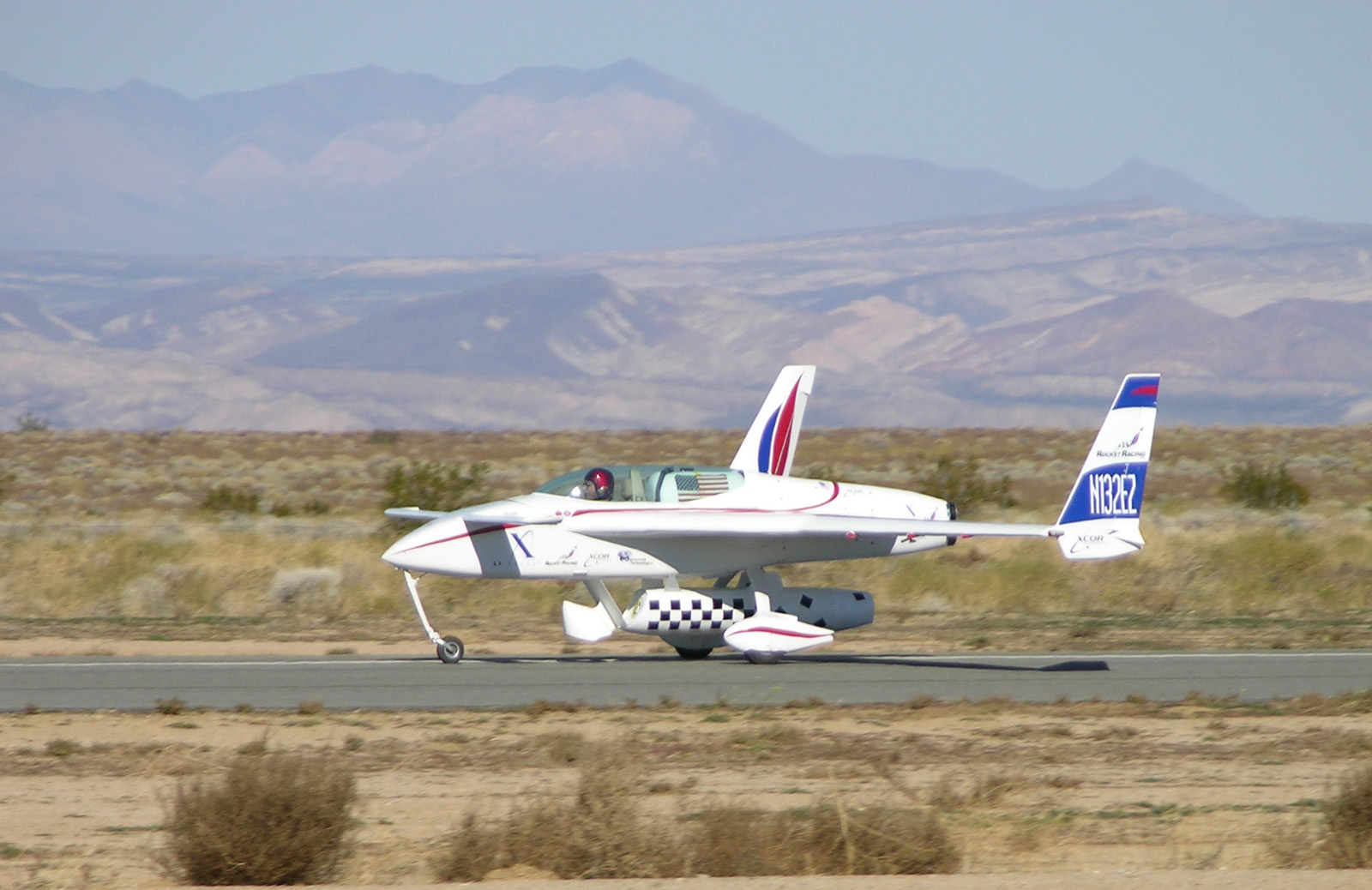
EZ-Rocket, flown by Dick Rutan, touches down at California City, California on December 3, 2005, setting a point-to-point distance record for rocket-powered, ground-launched aircraft.

- October 8, 2000 — First firing of an XCOR Aerospace LOX-powered rocket engine.
- July 21, 2001 — First flight, flown by Dick Rutan (single-engine configuration).
- October 3, 2001 — First flight in twin-engine configuration.
- January 24, 2002 — First rocketplane inflight engine relight. Piloted by Mike Melvill.
- June 24, 2002 — First touch-and-go of a rocket-powered aircraft (world record).
- Jul 11, 2002 — EZ-Rocket flies twice in one day. First same day rocketplane flights since 1945.
- July 25, 2002 — EZ-Rocket first Oshkosh flight at the 2002 EAA AirVenture Oshkosh air show. First rocketplane air show flight in the United States.
- July 27, 2002 — EZ-Rocket second Oshkosh flight at the 2002 EAA AirVenture Oshkosh air show. Second rocketplane air show flight in the United States.
- August 26, 2005 — EZ-Rocket requalification flight after three-year retirement. Piloted by Dick Rutan.
- August 29, 2005 — Searfoss qualification flight.
- September 1, 2005 — Altitude validation flight to 11,546 feet. Aircraft demonstrated sufficient range to fly from Mojave to California City and back without a relight, a prerequisite for the world record flight.
- October 9, 2005 — EZ-Rocket second and third Las Cruces flights, at Countdown to X PRIZE Cup. Third and fourth rocketplane air show flights in the United States.
- December 3, 2005 — Set the point-to-point distance record for a ground-launched, rocket-powered aircraft, flying 16 km from Mojave to California City in just under ten minutes, piloted by Dick Rutan. Also first official delivery of U.S. Mail by a rocket-powered aircraft. In recognition of this achievement, the FAI awarded Rutan the 2005 Louis Blériot Medal.
- December 15, 2005 — First cross-country return flight of a rocket-powered aircraft in the United States, return flight from California City, piloted by Rick Searfoss.

== Derivatives ==
The Rocket Racing League aircraft currently in development, the Mark-III X-racer, is a design descendant of the EZ-Rocket aircraft. Although XCOR is not the developer of the rocket engine for the Mark-III, XCOR did develop the rocket engine for the Mark-I X-Racer, the first of the X-Racers to use a single rocket engine on a Velocity SE basic airframe, and the first X-Racer to utilize kerosene instead of isopropyl alcohol fuel. XCOR used both design and operational experience from the EZ-Rocket in the Mark-I rocket aircraft design.

== Specifications ==
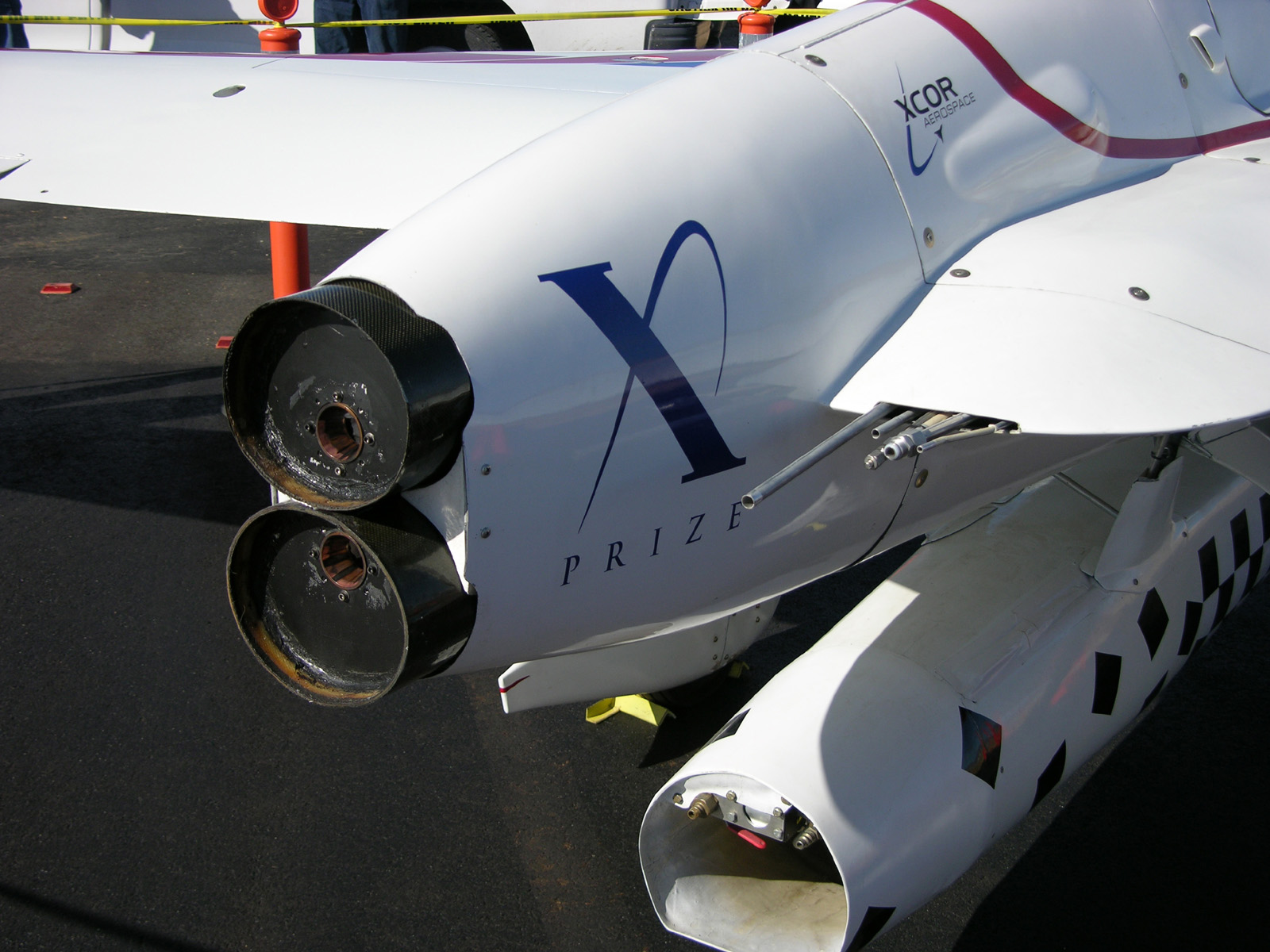
Twin rocket engines

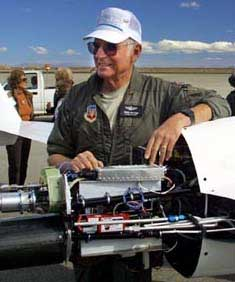
Dick Rutan standing next to the engines of the EZ-Rocket, after the official rollout flight, November 12, 2001

- Two XR-4A3 400 lbf (1.8 kN) thrust rocket engines (non throttleable, restartable in flight)
- 20 sec 500 m takeoff roll
- Vne = 200 kn (370 km/h)
- climb rate = 52 m/s (10,000 ft/min)
- maximum altitude = 11,546 ft (3,519 m) MSL
- Fuel: isopropyl alcohol and liquid oxygen
- Chamber pressure: ~ 350 psi (2.4 MPa)
- Specific impulse: 250 seconds (2.5 km/s) to 270 seconds (2.6 km/s)
- Noise: 128 dB at 10 meters

== See also ==
- Messerschmitt Me 163 Komet
