= XCOR Aerospace =

American private rocket engine and spaceflight development company

- Type: Private
- Industry: Aerospace and space tourism
- Founded: September 1999; 26 years ago
- Defunct: November 2017; 8 years ago
- Fate: Chapter 7 Bankruptcy
- Headquarters: Mojave Air and Space Port, Mojave, California
- Key people: John H. Gibson (CEO)
- Products: Suborbital spaceflight
- Website: www.xcor.com

XCOR Aerospace was an American private spaceflight and rocket engine development company based at the Mojave Air and Space Port in Mojave, California, Midland International Air and Spaceport in Midland, Texas and the Amsterdam area, the Netherlands. XCOR was formed in 1999 by former members of the Rotary Rocket rocket engine development team, and ceased operations in 2017.

By 2015, XCOR was headed by CEO John "Jay" Gibson, who remained CEO until June 2017. XCOR Aerospace was the parent operation, concerned with engineering and building spaceships and had two main subdivisions within it; XCOR Space Expeditions provided marketing and sales, and XCOR Science had been set up to conduct scientific and educational payload flights.

By May 2016, XCOR was laying off staff and in 2017, XCOR closed their doors for good and filed for Chapter 7 bankruptcy.

== History ==
The company was founded in Mojave, California in 1999 by Jeff Greason, Dan DeLong, Aleta Jackson and Doug Jones who had previously worked at the Rotary Rocket company.

In 2001, XCOR designed and built EZ-Rocket, the first privately built and flown rocket-powered airplane. EZ-Rocket made its maiden flight in July 2001.

XCOR moved its development and manufacturing operations to Midland, Texas from July 2012 to 2015. The company uses the Mojave Air and Space port primarily to conduct test flights.

In 2015, XCOR attracted investment from Chinese venture firm Haiyin Capital, valuing the company at $140 million.

From 1999 to 2015, Jeff Greason served as CEO. In mid-2015, John "Jay" Gibson succeeded Greason as CEO. Later that year three of the co-founders, Jeff Greason, Dan DeLong and Aleta Jackson, left the company to found Agile Aero, an aerospace company focused on rapid development and prototyping of aerodynamic spacecraft.

In May 2016, the company halted development of the Lynx spaceplane and pivoted company focus toward development its LOX/LH2 engine technology, particularly on a funded project for United Launch Alliance. The company laid off more than 20 people of the 50–60 persons onboard prior to May.

By the end of June 2017, CEO Gibson left the company, and the company laid off all remaining employees, hiring about half back on a contract basis. The company filed for Chapter 7 Bankruptcy in November 2017.

== Projects ==
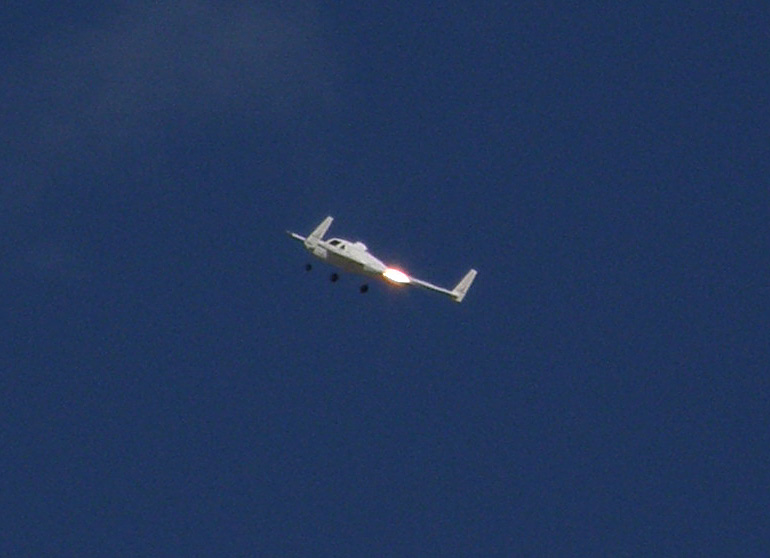
The prototype Rocket Racer, a modified Velocity SE climbing to 10,000 feet on its first full flight, October 29, 2007 at the Mojave Spaceport

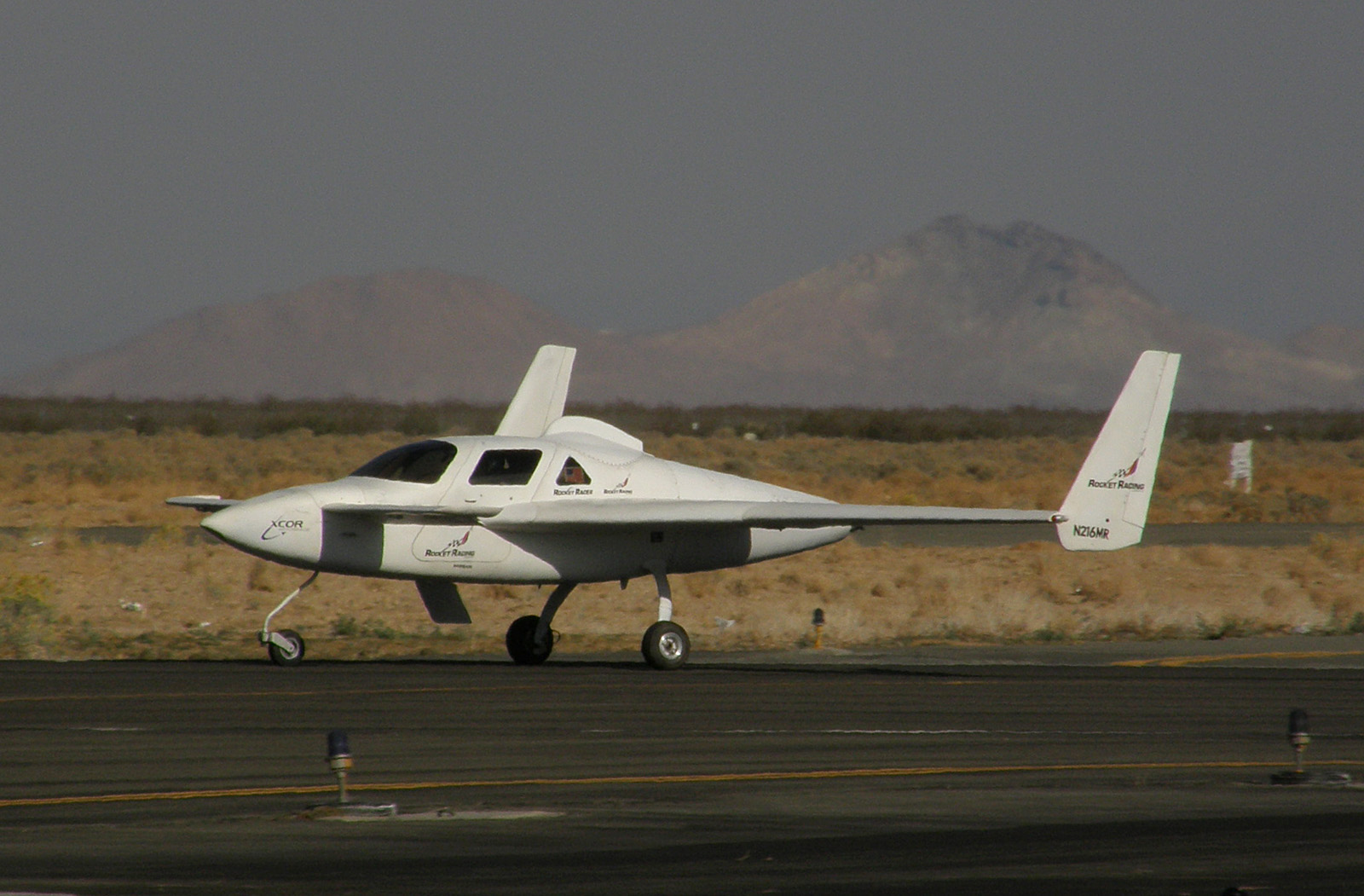
The Rocket Racer on landing roll-out at Mojave

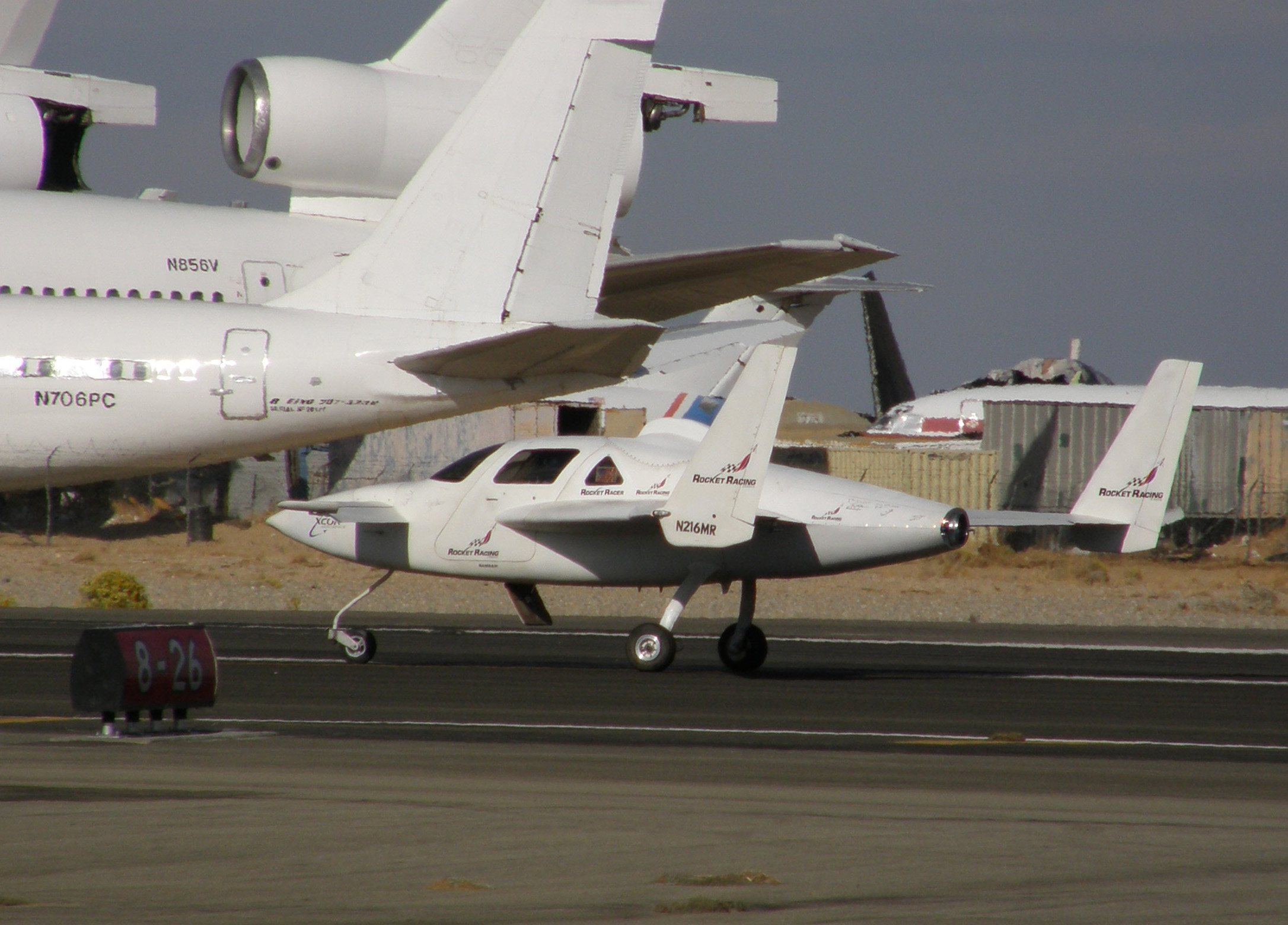
Aft view of the Rocket Racer on landing roll-out at Mojave

=== Lynx rocketplane ===
The Lynx was planned to be capable of carrying a pilot and a passenger or payload on sub-orbital spaceflights over 100 kilometres (62 mi). Between 20 and 50 test flights of Lynx were planned, along with numerous static engine firings on the ground. A full step-by-step set of taxi tests, runway hops and full-up flights were planned to get the vehicle to a state of operational readiness. Lynx was envisaged to be roughly the size of a small private airplane. It was planned to be capable of flying several times a day making use of reusable, non-toxic engines to help keep the space plane's operating costs low. The Lynx superseded a previous design, the Xerus spaceplane. The Lynx was initially announced in March 2008, with plans for an operational vehicle within two years. That date slipped, first to 2012, then to 2015 and in January 2016 the company declined to give a projected date for the first test flight. The Mark II was projected to fly twelve to eighteen months after the first test flight depending on how fast the prototype moved through the test program.

As of 2012, XCOR had presold 175 Lynx flights at US$95,000 each.

On 27 May 2016, XCOR laid off a significant portion of its workforce and placed the development of the Lynx Spacecraft on indefinite hold to focus on development of a rocket engine.

=== XCOR Orbital ===
Should Lynx prove successful, there was a plan to continue on to a two stage air launched fully reusable orbital launch system. The plan was to use a Boeing 767 as the carrier plane, a first stage with an uncertain number of kerosene-oxygen engines, and a second stage with three hydrogen-oxygen engines. Details are not public.

=== Thermoplastic polymer development ===
XCOR has developed Nonburnite, a cryo-compatible, inherently non-combustible composite material based on a thermoplastic fluoropolymer resin. Low coefficient of thermal expansion and inherent resistance to microcracking make it well suited to cryogenic tank use and also part of vehicle structure. As of February 2012, Nonburnite was to have been used in the tanks of the Lynx rocketplane.

=== XCOR/ULA liquid-hydrogen, upper-stage engine development project ===
In March 2011, United Launch Alliance (ULA) announced they had entered into a joint-development contract with XCOR for a flight-ready, 25,000 to 30,000 pounds-force (110–130 kN) cryogenic LH2/LOX upper-stage rocket engine. Partially as a result of positive results achieved from an earlier (2010) effort to develop a new aluminium alloy engine nozzle using innovative manufacturing techniques, ULA believes the new engine technology will save several hundred pounds of weight from the large engine and will "lead to significantly lower-cost and more-capable commercial and US government space flights."

The "multi-year project's main objective [was] to produce a flight-ready LOX/LH2 upper-stage engine in the 25,000 to 30,000 pounds-force (110 to 130 kN)-thrust class that costs significantly less to produce and is easier to operate and integrate than competing engine technologies"

2011 demonstration test firings of an aluminum nozzle on XCOR's Lynx 5K18 LOX/kerosene engine demonstrated "the ability of the aluminum nozzle to withstand the high temperatures of rocket-engine exhaust over numerous tests, with no discernable degradation of the material properties of the alloys. The tests validated the design, materials and manufacturing processes used in the nozzle, and laid a foundation for scaling the design to EELV-sized engines."

As of 2011, the length of the development program was stated to depend on "the level of investment as milestones are met in the build-a-little, test-a-little approach favored by XCOR." If investment is minimized, flight engines would not be available for five to ten years.

A subscale 2,500 pounds-force (11 kN)-thrust LH2/LOX engine was developed by 2013, named the XR-5H25, in order to support the XCOR/ULA engine development program. The first hot fire test of the prototype engine was in November 2013, the test was deemed successful. It was also the first demonstrated use of a piston-pump-fed LH2 rocket engine, a new method to design "liquid hydrogen rocket engines that fundamentally breaks current cost, reliability and operational models".

In April 2015, ULA announced that the XCOR/ULA joint-development rocket engine is one of the candidate engines for a new ULA upper stage rocket to be fielded no earlier than 2023. The Advanced Cryogenic Evolved Stage (ACES) is a long-life-on-orbit, high-performance, upper stage that, after consideration/competition by ULA, will use one of three engines to go into production with. The other engines under consideration are the 110-kilonewton (25,000 lbf)-Aerojet Rocketdyne RL10 and the 670-kilonewton (150,000 lbf)-Blue Origin BE-3. ACES will be a second stage for the Vulcan launch vehicle after 2023, in lieu of the Centaur upper stage that is projected to fly on Vulcan as early as 2019.

=== Historical projects ===
Completed projects have included:

- EZ-Rocket, a Rutan Long-EZ homebuilt aircraft fitted with two XR-4A3 400 pounds-force (1.8 kN) thrust rocket engines replacing the normal propeller engine. EZ-Rocket has been flown at numerous airshows including the 2005 Countdown to X Prize Cup and the 2002 Oshkosh Airshow. EZ-Rocket was "the first rocket-powered aircraft built and flown by a non-governmental entity". On 3 December 2005, XCOR Aerospace flew its EZ-Rocket from Mojave, California to California City, California, both in Kern County. Test pilot Dick Rutan made the flight, which lasted about 9 minutes and carried US mail from the post office in Mojave to addresses in California City. This was the first time that a crewed, rocket-powered aircraft was used to carry U.S. Mail.
- Rocket Racer - The EZ-Rocket program led to a second rocketplane design for the Rocket Racing League. It was built on a Velocity SE airframe and later became known as the Mark-I X-Racer. It was powered by an XCOR regeneratively cooled and pump-fed XR-4K14 rocket engine. This rocket-powered aircraft flew several demonstration flights at the 2008 EAA AirVenture Oshkosh air show. The total thrust for the single-engine Mark-I X-Racer has been variously reported as 1,500 lbf (6,700 N) to 1,800 lbf (8,000 N), approximately twice that of the EZ-Rocket initial prototype. The engine uses pressure-fed LOX and pump-fed kerosene, a combination that allows the fuel to be stored in the airplane's wing tanks while avoiding potential complications with pumping liquid oxygen. After flight testing of the X-Racer was completed in 2008, XCOR completed seven rocketplane flights in one day.
- Tea cart engine, a 15 lbf (67 N) thrust rocket motor burning nitrous oxide and ethane, mounted on a small industrial cart. The tea cart engine has repeatedly been fired indoors at conferences and demonstrations and had accumulated over 1,837 firings and 9,039 seconds of run time by February 25, 2009.
- LOX/methane rocket engines in testing in 2005.
- Early LOX/methane work led to a NASA contract, jointly with ATK, to develop a 7,500 lbf (33,000 N) engine for potential use as the CEV lunar return engine. On January 16, 2007 XCOR announced the successful test firing of a preliminary "workhorse" version of this engine.

== XCOR Space Expeditions ==
=== History ===
The Space Expedition Corporation (SXC) was founded by Harry van Hulten and Lt-Gen (ret.) Ben Droste in 2008. Initially operating under a wet-lease agreement with XCOR Aerospace, it was acquired by XCOR Aerospace in June 2014 and was a fully owned subsidiary. Michiel Mol and Maarten Elshove joined SXC in 2010 and are thus considered founders. After the acquisition by XCOR Aerospace SXC was rebranded as XCOR Space Expeditions and integrated into the XCOR brand. XCOR Aerospace was organized as part of XCOR Corporate, but operated as the center of XCOR.

=== Space flights ===
XCOR Space Expeditions offered suborbital flights with the XCOR Lynx Mark I and Lynx Mark II Spaceships for the public. It planned to operate from Mojave, California, and Curaçao, where a spaceport was to be built.

XCOR Space Expeditions also offered medical check ups, training missions with space simulators and G-Force Fighter Jet flights for ticketholders, among other preoperational missions and events.

Approximately 282 people pre-purchased tickets for a Lynx ride. Customers paid up to $100,000 for a ticket, with some of that supposedly in an escrow account to be refunded in the case of a bankruptcy, but as of December 2018, most ticket-holders have not been refunded.

== XCOR Science ==
XCOR Science offered payload flights for educational institutions and science to conduct experiments in space.

The Lynx Mark I and Mark II allow a maximum payload of 140 kg to be transported into space besides the pilot. Payloads are separated into two parts, whereas Payload A with a maximum capacity of 20 kg is situated in a vessel behind the pilot seat. Payload B with a mass up to 120 kg takes the space of the second seat.

It was planned in the future to develop the Lynx Mark III which will have the same capabilities as the Lynx Mark II and to fly up to 100 km above ground. In addition to the payloads of the Lynx Mark I and II, the Lynx Mark III would have an external dorsal mounted pod which will hold up an extra 650 kg.

No actual flights were made at the time the company filed for bankruptcy in November 2017.

== See also ==
- Rocket mail
- X Prize Cup
