= Sankt Radegund bei Graz =

- Municipality
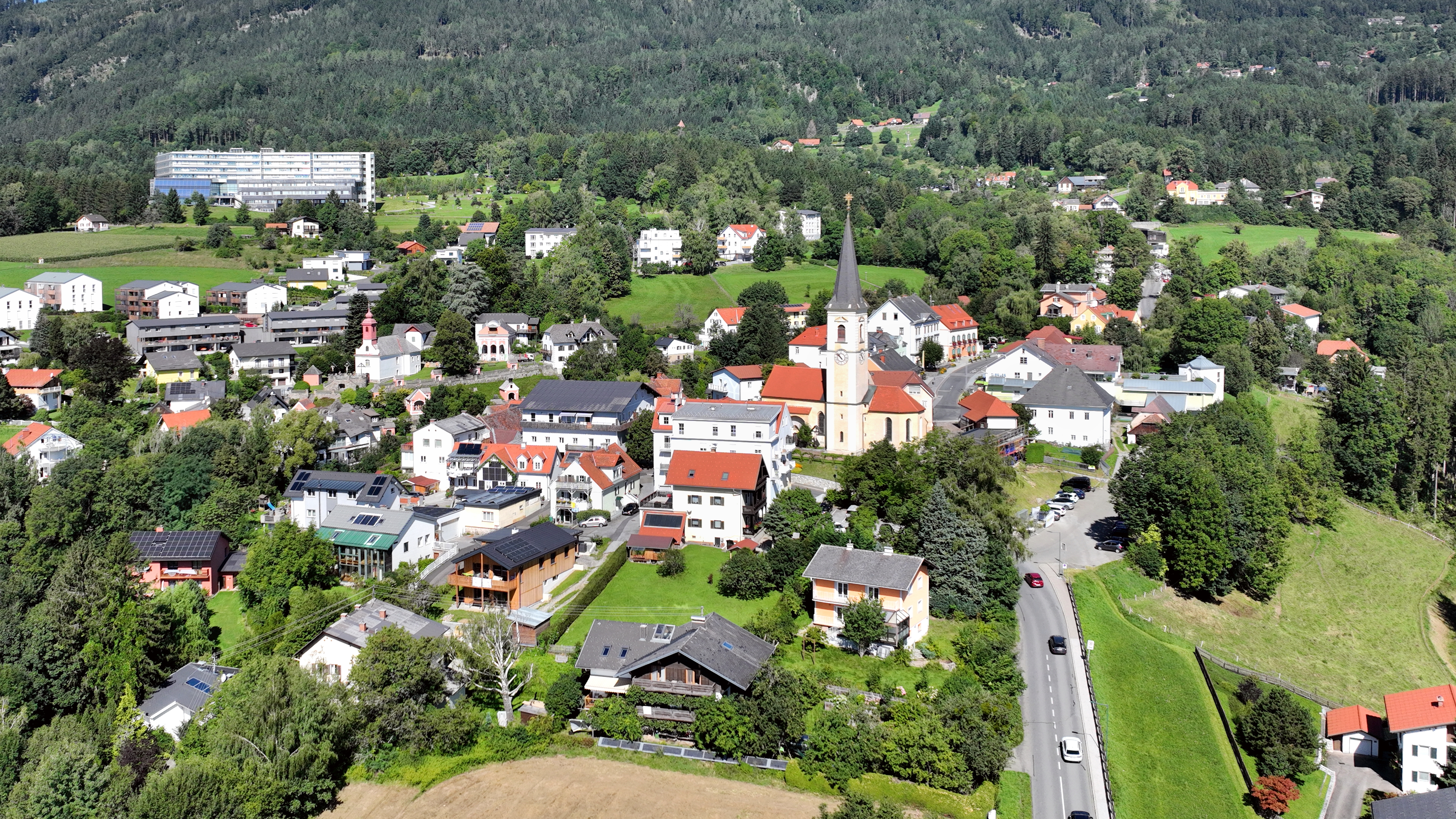
- Southeast view of St. Radegund bei Graz

- Coat of arms

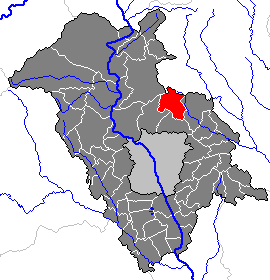
- Location within Graz-Umgebung district

- Location within Austria
- Coordinates: 47°10′52″N 15°29′22″E
- Country: Austria
- State: Styria
- District: Graz-Umgebung

Government
  - Mayor: Hannes Kogler (ÖVP)

Area
  - Total: 21.6 km^{2} (8.3 sq mi)
- Elevation: 717 m (2,352 ft)

Population (2018-01-01)
  - Total: 2,165
  - Density: 100/km^{2} (260/sq mi)
- Time zone: UTC+1 (CET)
  - Summer (DST): UTC+2 (CEST)
- Postal code: 8061
- Area code: 03132
- Vehicle registration: GU
- Website: www.radegund.info

Sankt Radegund bei Graz is a municipality in the district of Graz-Umgebung in the Austrian state of Styria. It is named after Saint Radegund.

== Population ==
Historical population
| Year | Pop. | ±% |
|---|---|---|
| 1869 | 953 | — |
| 1880 | 976 | +2.4% |
| 1890 | 1,093 | +12.0% |
| 1900 | 1,061 | −2.9% |
| 1910 | 1,111 | +4.7% |
| 1923 | 1,025 | −7.7% |
| 1934 | 1,134 | +10.6% |
| 1939 | 1,129 | −0.4% |
| 1951 | 1,312 | +16.2% |
| 1961 | 1,358 | +3.5% |
| 1971 | 1,524 | +12.2% |
| 1981 | 1,709 | +12.1% |
| 1991 | 1,071 | −37.3% |
| 2001 | 2,001 | +86.8% |
