= Astra Rocket =

Launch vehicles developed by Astra

Rocket 3
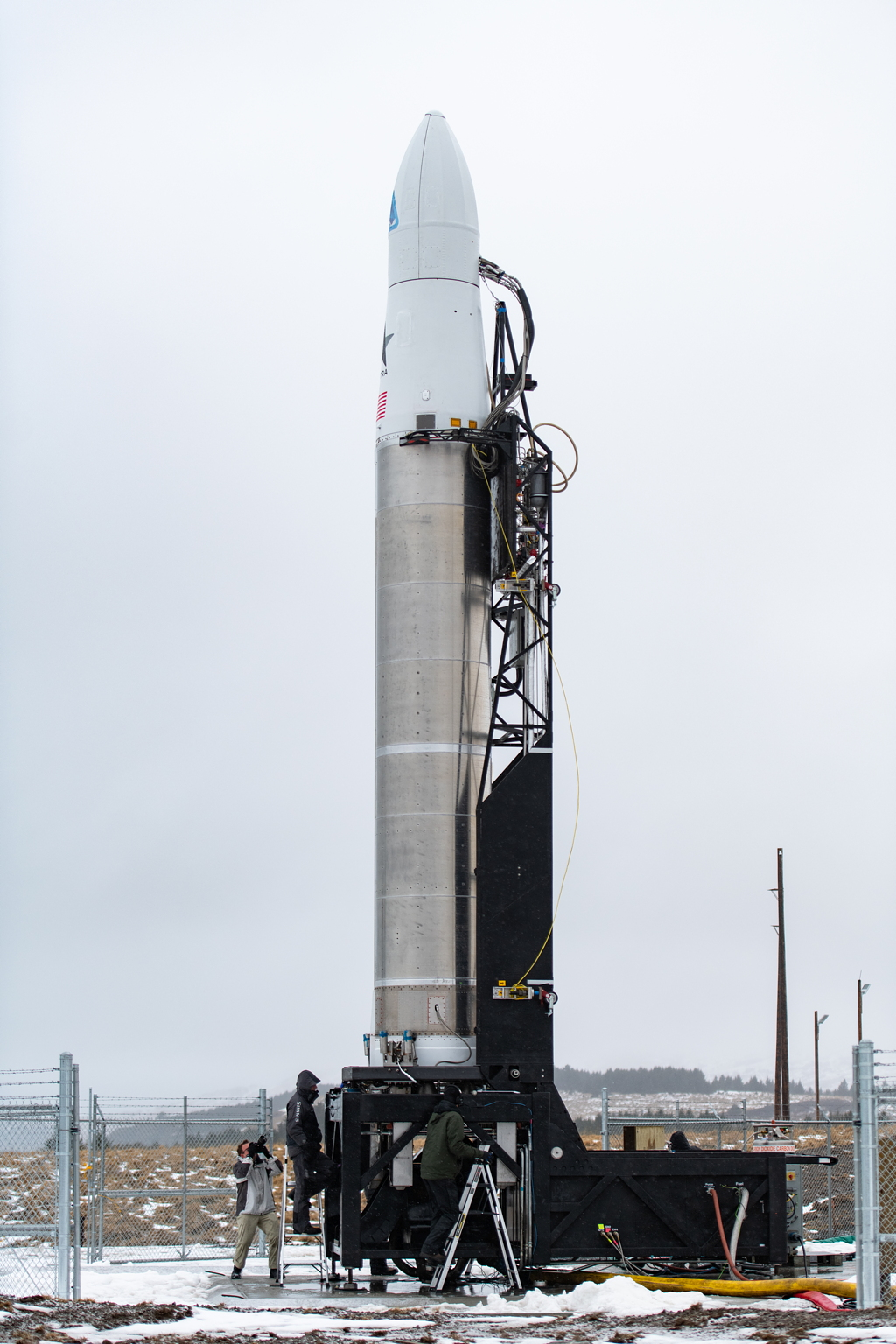
- Rocket 3.0 being prepared to launch.
- Function: Orbital launch vehicle
- Manufacturer: Astra
- Country of origin: United States
- Cost per launch: US$2.5 million

Size
- Height: 43 ft (13 m)

Capacity

Payload to SSO
- Altitude: 500 km (310 mi)
- Mass: 20–50 kg (44–110 lb)

Associated rockets
- Comparable: Electron; Pegasus

Launch history
- Status: Retired
- Launch sites: PSCA, CCSFS SLC-46
- Total launches: 7 (+1 rocket destroyed before launch)
- Success(es): 2
- Failure: 5 (+1 rocket destroyed before launch)

First stage
- Powered by: 5 Delphin
- Maximum thrust: c. 32,500 lbf (145 kN)
- Propellant: Kerosene/LOX

Second stage
- Engines: 1 Aether
- Thrust: 740 lbf (3,300 N) vacuum
- Propellant: Kerosene/LOX

The Astra Rocket was a small-lift space launch vehicle series designed, manufactured, and operated by American company Astra (formerly known as Ventions). The rockets were designed to be manufactured at minimal cost, employing very simple materials and techniques. They were also designed to be launched by a very small team, and be transported from the factory to the launch pad in standard shipping containers.

The Rocket name was shared by several launch vehicles. Rocket 1 was test vehicle made up of a booster equipped with five Delphin electric-pump-fed rocket engines, and a mass simulator meant to occupy the place of a second stage. Rocket 2 was a prototype similar to Rocket 1. Rocket 3 was a launch vehicle which added a pressure-fed second stage to the Delphin-powered booster. Its definitive variant, Rocket 3.3, featured a lengthened booster, and delivered satellites to orbit. Rocket 4 was to have been an all-new design for a larger, more powerful rocket. The rocket family originated in Small Air Launch Vehicle to Orbit (SALVO), a small launch vehicle powered by Astra's electric-pump-fed liquid rocket engine produced for the DARPA ALASA program. Following the end of the ALASA program, development of launch vehicle technology and systems continued, producing the Rocket family.

The Rocket series was designed as a simple, low-cost space launch vehicle. No engine on the rocket made use of turbomachinery and the rocket's construction was of welded sheet aluminium as opposed to lightweight machined panels. It was also physically small, with the longest variant, Rocket 3.3, 43 ft (13 m) in height.

Astra's Rocket series was developed with experience gained from the company's work on the SALVO air-launched launch vehicle, for which the Delphin rocket engine was designed. Its career was marked by several series of failures; of 10 launch campaigns, only 2 missions were successfully completed.

After the failure of Rocket 3.3 LV0010, production and operation of the Rocket 3 launcher was cancelled in favour of a new rocket, Rocket 4.

== History ==
Ventions, the predecessor to Astra, had developed an air-launched orbital launch system for the SALVO program. Development of an electric-pump-fed rocket engine, later known as Delphin, took place as part of SALVO in 2012.

In 2016, Ventions was re-incorporated as Astra, under the ownership of Chris Kemp. The reorganized company proceeded to begin the development of a new carrier rocket, designed to be as simple and as inexpensive as possible. The rocket was to be both very small and constructed of basic materials, in order to facilitate a goal of launching on a daily basis. Additionally, it was to be transported in standard shipping containers and have a highly automated launch system that required as few personnel as possible. To accelerate the development of this new launch system, Astra made use of designs and hardware from the SALVO rocket.

In 2017, Astra, under the name Ventions, received funding from NASA to develop the launch system.

In November 2021, after nine years of development, Rocket 3.3 reach orbit for the first time.

In August 2022, citing the poor reliability of Rocket 3, Astra announced that it was ending operations of the vehicle and transitioning into development of Rocket 4, an all-new design.

== Variants ==
=== SALVO ===
SALVO (Small Affordable Launch Vehicle to Orbit, later Small Air Launch Vehicle to Orbit) was a two stage rocket with two electric-pump-fed engines on its first stage. It was developed as a pathfinder for the much larger ALASA. Only two people were required to launch the rocket - the pilot and the weapon system officer (WSO) of the F-15 carrier aircraft. ALASA was intended to send 45kg to orbit at a target launch price of $1 million USD. ALASA, along with SALVO, were terminated in 2015 due to technical challenges.

=== Rocket 1 ===
Rocket 1 was a test vehicle developed using unflown hardware and software from SALVO. This vehicle utilized five first stage "Delphin" engines. While second stage engine "Aether" was still being developed, an upper stage (second stage) mass simulator was used in its place. A number of unsuccessful launch attempts were made between March 2018 and July 2018, with launch ultimately taking place 20 July 2018; the launch was a failure.

=== Rocket 2 ===
This launch had no customer and acted as a suborbital test flight using a mass simulator for the second stage, as the Aether second stage engine was still in development. There was no payload on board. The mission planned to fly on an azimuth of 195° from the spaceport, but the license did not disclose the planned altitude or downrange distance for the mission. The launch happened on 29 November 2018; the launch was a failure.

=== Rocket 3 ===
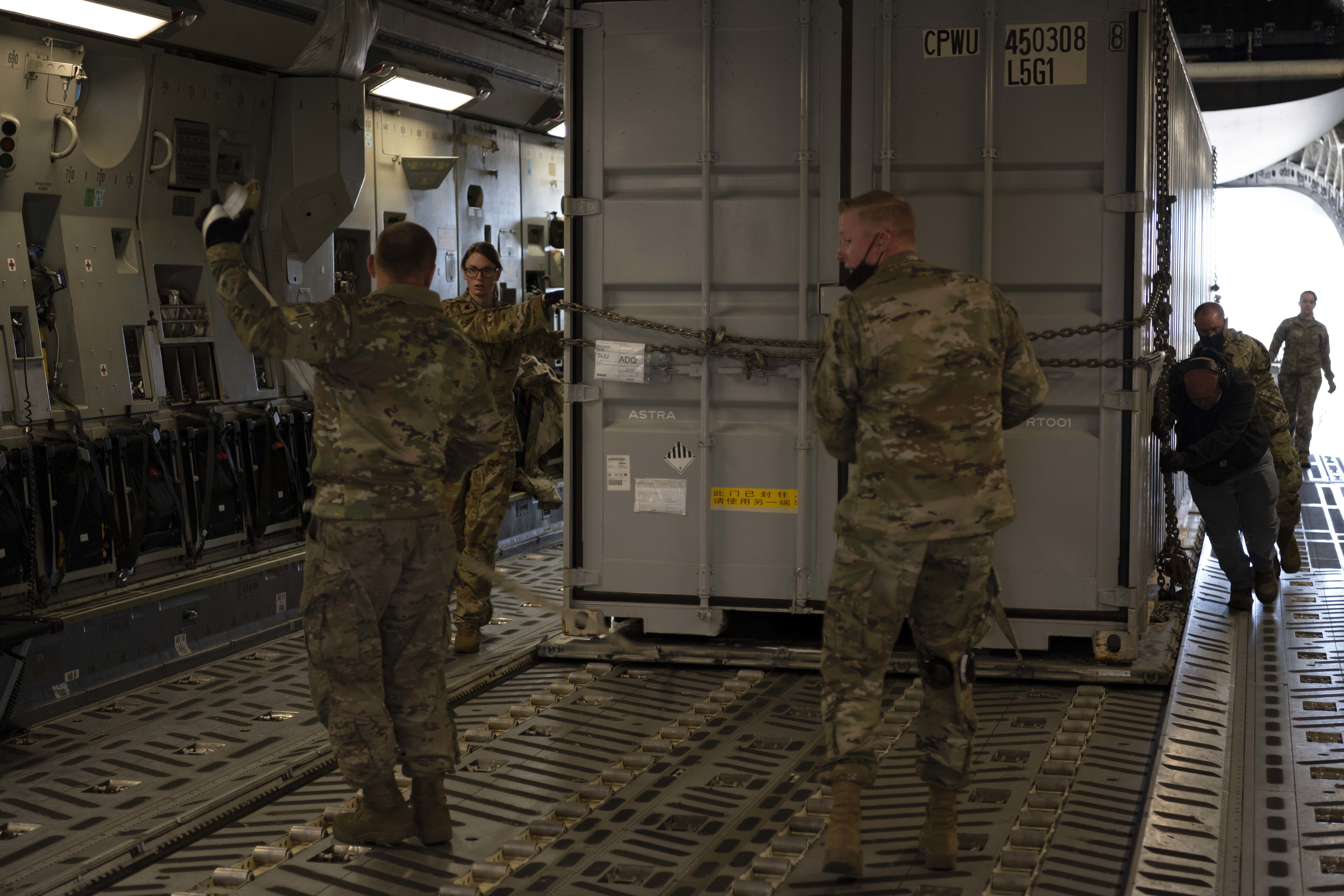
60th Air Mobility Wing transporting LV0006 on a C-17 Globemaster III

Rocket 3 was a 11.6 m (38 ft) launch vehicle that had a payload capacity of 25 kg (55 lb) to a 500 km (310 mi) Sun-synchronous orbit. The rocket consisted of two stages. The first stage had five electric-pump-fed "Delphin" engines with 6,500 lbf (29,kN) of thrust each. The second stage had one pressure-fed "Aether" engine with 740 lbf (3.3kN) (vacuum) of thrust.

The first Rocket 3, "1 of 3" or "Rocket 3.0", completed a static fire test at Castle Airport, California. It was planned to launch from Pacific Spaceport Complex – Alaska (PSCA) with attempted launches in late February and early March 2020, with the last launch attempt on 2 March 2020, as part of the DARPA Launch Challenge. Three CubeSats for the U.S. Department of Defense and the University of South Florida, along with a space-based beacon designed to aid in space traffic management, were slated to ride into orbit on "1 of 3". On 2 March 2020, DARPA and Astra officials said the Prometheus CubeSat, the University of South Florida's two Articulated Reconnaissance and Communications Expedition (ARCE) nanosatellites, and the space-based radio beacon payload were to be removed from the rocket after the end of the Launch Challenge. Astra had failed to launch within the DARPA Launch Challenge's launch window; launch preparations continued regardless for the test flight. The rocket suffered a destructive fire at the launch pad on 23 March 2020.

The second Rocket 3, "2 of 3" or "Rocket 3.1", was launched on 12 September 2020. The launch ended in failure.

The third Rocket 3, "3 of 3" or "Rocket 3.2", was launched on 15 December 2020. The launch ended in failure.

==== Rocket 3.3 ====
On 20 November 2021, Astra's Rocket 3.3 vehicle (serial number LV0007) successfully reached orbit after launching from Pacific Spaceport Complex – Alaska (PSCA) carrying the demonstration payload STP-27AD2 (COSPAR 2021-108A, SATCAT 49494) for the United States Space Force.

On 15 March 2022, Astra Rocket 3.3 vehicle (serial number LV0009) successfully reached orbit with the Astra-1 mission.

Rocket 3.3 failed 3 launches: 28 August 2021, 10 February 2022, 12 June 2022; see launch failures below.

== Proposed variants ==
Rocket 4
- Function: Orbital launch vehicle
- Manufacturer: Astra
- Country of origin: United States

Size
- Height: 18.9 m (62 ft)

Capacity
- Payload to LEO: 550 kg

Launch history
- Total launches: 0

First stage
- Powered by: 2 Chiron (Firefly Reaver engine variant)
- Maximum thrust: c. 70,000 lbf (310 kN)
- Propellant: Kerosene/LOX

Second stage
- Engines: 1 Hadley ITV
- Thrust: 6,500 lbf (29,000 N) vacuum
- Propellant: Kerosene/LOX

=== Rocket 4 ===
Rocket 4 is to be a new launch vehicle, much larger than the previous Rocket 3.3 and capable of carrying up to 600 kg (1,300 lb) to orbit, and 350 kg (770 lb) to a sun-synchronous orbit. The vehicle's upper stage is designed to integrate the Ursa Major Hadley engine, while the booster will feature 2 turbopump-fed engines, with a combined thrust of 70,000 lbf (310 kN). The booster engine, referred to as "Chiron", is procured from Firefly Aerospace under contract, in which Firefly modified Reaver engines to have different gimballing, thrust, and mixture control to meet Astra's needs as part of Firefly's rocket engine program. Firefly would initially supply up to 50 Chirons to Astra.

=== Rocket 5 ===
In September 2020, Astra submitted a proposal to the Air Force's AFWERX program titled "Responsive Launch Enabled by Astra's Rocket 5.0". Rocket 5 was to be a variant of the Rocket 3 dedicated to suborbital point-to-point delivery, featuring a modified second stage between the Rocket 3's first and upper stages.

== Launch history ==
- Failure
- Loss before launch
- Partial Failure
- Success
- Planned

Flight	Date / time (UTC)	Rocket / Serial Number	Launch site	Payload	Payload mass	Orbit	Customer	Outcome (Note: For consistency, the outcome of the flight is measured by whether the rocket achieves a stable orbit. The company may have particular objectives for test flights that are more or less strenuous than reaching orbit.)
1	20 July 2018	Rocket 1	PSCA, Pad 2	Mass Simulator	Unknown	Suborbital	Test Flight	Failure
1	P120 mission for a commercial customer. The FAA reported an unknown mishap occurred during the launch; Astra later noted the launch was successful.							
2	29 November 2018	Rocket 2	PSCA, Pad 2	Mass Simulator	Unknown	Suborbital	Test Flight	Failure
2	Launch for a commercial customer. Flight ended earlier than planned, likely due to engine failure. Rather than including an active second stage, this launch carried an "upper stage mass simulator".							
N/A	23 March 2020	Rocket 3.0	PSCA, Pad 3B	N/A	N/A	LEO	DARPA Launch Challenge	Precluded
N/A	"1 of 3". Initially intended to be part of the DARPA Launch Challenge, but failed to launch within the challenge's launch window due to an issue with a sensor for the guidance, navigation, and control systems. The rocket was reused for the next launch without DARPA involvement, but on 23 March 2020, the rocket exploded during testing, with no personnel injuries.							
3	12 September 2020; 03:19	Rocket 3.1	PSCA, Pad 3B	None	N/A	LEO	None	Failure
3	Formerly "2 of 3". Second attempt to launch a Rocket 3 for the first time. Initially intended to be the second of two launches for the DARPA Launch Challenge. 26.2 seconds after liftoff, engines were shut down by the range safety officer.							
4	15 December 2020; 20:55	Rocket 3.2	PSCA, Pad 3B	None	N/A	LEO	None	Failure
4	Formerly "3 of 3". First Astra rocket to pass the Kármán Line and reach its target orbital altitude of 390 kilometers. Narrowly failed to reach stable orbit due to issues with the upper stage propellant mixture ratio, but exceeded the company's expectations with an otherwise-successful climb into near-orbital space from Kodiak Island, Alaska.							
5	28 August 2021; 22:35	Rocket 3.3 / LV0006	PSCA, Pad 3B	STP-27AD1		LEO	U.S. Space Force	Failure
5	First commercial Rocket 3 launch, and first of two demonstration launches for the U.S. Space Force. An engine failure shortly after liftoff caused the rocket to drift sideways off the launch pad before ascending vertically. At approximately T+02:28, range safety ordered engine shutdown, terminating the flight. A fueling system propellant leak was determined to be the root cause of the problem.							
6	20 November 2021; 06:16	LV0007	PSCA, Pad 3B	STP-27AD2		LEO	U.S. Space Force	Success
6	Second demonstration launch for the U.S. Space Force. This was Astra's first undisputed success.							
7	10 February 2022; 20:00	LV0008	CC, SLC-46	BAMA-1, INCA, QubeSat, R5-S1		LEO	NASA	Failure
7	NASA Venture Class Launch Services 2 (VCLS 2) Mission One, officially known as VCLS Demo-2A. The ELaNa 41 mission, consisting of four CubeSats, was launched on this flight. An issue occurred after stage separation during flight which prevented delivery of the payloads into orbit. The failure was later found to have been caused by a wiring error in the separation mechanism and a software flaw in the thrust vector system.							
8	15 March 2022; 16:22	LV0009	PSCA, Pad 3B	S4 Crossover (EyeStar-S4), OreSat0, 16 × SpaceBEE, 4 × SpaceBEE NZ		SSO	NearSpace Launch, Portland State University	Success
8	Astra-1 rideshare mission for Spaceflight, Inc.; all payloads deployed successfully. S4 Crossover, carrying EyeStar-S4, remained attached to the second stage as intended.							
9	12 June 2022; 17:43	LV0010	CC, SLC-46	TROPICS × 2	19 kg (42 lb)	LEO	NASA	Failure
9	First of three planned launches for the TROPICS constellation. Both satellites were lost as the rocket failed to reach orbit. The constellation was intended to consist of six satellites in total. The remaining satellites were launched by Rocket Lab's Electron in May 2023.							

== Launch failures ==
Of nine launches of Astra rockets, seven were failures, with an additional rocket destroyed during preparations for launch.

=== Rocket 1 ===
At approximately 22:00 UTC on 20 July 2018, Rocket 1 left the Pacific Spaceport Complex – Alaska (PSCA) Launch Pad 2 for the company's first sub-orbital launch attempt. After approximately 27 seconds of propelled flight, the rocket began to fall, exploding after hitting the launch pad. As the launch took place in heavy fog and was furthermore kept secret, little was known about the launch failure. Confirmation of the failure took place a day later when the Federal Aviation Administration stated that a mishap had occurred.

=== Rocket 2 ===
Rocket 2 was launched 30 November 2018 at 03:00 UTC from Pacific Spaceport Complex – Alaska, Launch Pad 2, the same used for Rocket 1. After approximately 30 seconds of powered flight, the Delphin engines began to fail, causing the rocket to fall and crash into the ground. The maximum altitude attained by Rocket 2 was stated to be about 100 m (330 ft) greater than that for Rocket 1.

=== Rocket 3.0 destruction before launch ===
On 23 March 2020, Rocket 3.0 was destroyed in an explosion during testing in preparation for launch. Partway through the series of tests, the supply of helium gas, used to prime parts of the rocket, was depleted. To complete a first stage test, it was decided to transfer surplus helium from the second stage into the booster. However, the helium had been cooled by the adjacent cryogenic liquid oxygen. A plastic valve used to control the flow of helium thereafter became stuck open due to the cold temperatures encountered, allowing unrestricted flow of helium into the booster. The resulting gas buildup caused a tank to rupture, causing the rocket to explode on the pad, destroying itself and the launch infrastructure.

=== Rocket 3.1 guidance failure ===
On 12 September 2020, Rocket 3.1 was launched from the PSCA. After ascending for some 15 seconds, the rocket began to exhibit roll oscillation, which caused it to deviate from its intended trajectory. The rocket's flight was therefore terminated about 30 seconds after liftoff, destroying the vehicle.

=== Rocket 3.2 failure to reach orbit ===
On 15 December 2020 at roughly 20:55 UTC, Astra launched its third Rocket 3 vehicle, called Rocket 3.2. The rocket successfully passed the Kármán Line and reached its target orbital altitude of 390 kilometers, a first for Astra. However, due to issues with the upper stage's fuel mixture, the rocket failed to achieve orbit. The company declared the flight a success, arguing that their objective for the test flight was to achieve a successful cut-off of the first stage's main engine, which was achieved.

=== Rocket 3.3 LV0006 engine failure ===
On 28 August 2021 at 22:35 UTC, Astra launched its fourth Rocket 3 vehicle, Rocket 3.3 (serial number LV0006). The flight carried an instrumentation payload for the United States Space Force under the Space Test Program, and a separation of payload from the launch vehicle was not planned. Shortly after liftoff, a single engine failure caused the vehicle to begin drifting horizontally for several tens of meters off the launch pad before beginning to ascend vertically. The rocket then exceeded its allowable trajectory, and was destroyed about 2 minutes and 28 seconds after launch. The rocket reached a peak altitude of 50 km (31 mi) before crashing into the ocean downrange of the launch site. Astra determined a small propellant leakage from the launcher fueling system caused an explosion that disabled one of the five engines.

=== Rocket 3.3 LV0008 fairing deploy failure ===
On 10 February 2022, Rocket 3.3 LV0008 successfully launched. However, the payload fairing failed to separate and ignition of the second-stage occurred with the fairing still attached. The second stage punched through the fairing and spun out of control. Shortly after this anomaly the flight was terminated and the payload lost. The post-launch investigation later found that the failure was caused by an error in the wiring diagram which prevented the fairings from separating completely before second stage ignition, coupled with a software problem that resulted in the upper stage engine being unable to use its thrust vector system to correct the tumbling after stage ignition.

=== Rocket 3.3 LV0010 (TROPICS) fuel mixture failure ===
On 12 June 2022, Astra Rocket 3.3 vehicle (serial number LV0010) failed to reach orbit after unusually high fuel consumption was observed. The rocket's payload, two TROPICS satellites for NASA's TROPICS weather research (rainfall and hurricanes) constellation, was destroyed. A post-mission failure analysis determined that the high rate of fuel consumption was ultimately caused by fuel boiling within the regenerative cooling channels of the Aether engine. This effect, previously unobserved, was attributed to the warmer weather at the Cape Canaveral Space Force Station heating the fuel more before it was loaded onto the vehicle compared to the weather encountered at Astra's Alaska launch site. This was the final flight of Rocket 3.
