= Vector Launch =

Defunct launch vehicle designer and launch service provider

Vector Launch, Inc.
- Type: Private
- Industry: Aerospace
- Founded: March 2, 2016; 10 years ago
- Defunct: 2026
- Fate: Acquired by Phantom Space
- Successor: Phantom Space
- Headquarters: Tucson, Arizona, U.S.
- Key people: John Garvey (CEO); Jim Cantrell (former CEO); Eric Besnard (CTO) Robert Spalding; Shaun Coleman (GM, Investor, Board Member)
- Products: Vector-R, Vector-H
- Website: vector-launch.com

Vector Launch, Inc. (formerly Vector Space Systems) was an American space technology company which aims to launch suborbital and orbital payloads. Vector Launch declared bankruptcy in December 2019 and re-emerged in October 2020, only to be re-acquired by the original CEO Jim Cantrell and his new space company, Phantom Space.

== History ==
The company's first CEO was Jim Cantrell, who co-founded the company with John Garvey, Shaun Coleman, Ken Sunshine, and Eric Besnard. Cantrell had previously helped Elon Musk found SpaceX in 2001. Vector Launch, Inc. received US$1 million in seed angel funding from entrepreneur Shaun Coleman soon after its foundation in 2016 and additionally $21 million from Sequoia Capital, Shasta Ventures and Lightspeed Venture Partners in June 2017. It had offices in Tucson, Arizona, and an engineering facility in Huntington Beach, California. In July 2016, Vector acquired Garvey Spacecraft, and began designing rockets based on Garvey's designs. The company was also investing in software capabilities. It had a platform called Galactic Sky, located in San Jose, California, which was developing software-defined satellites to provide start-ups and entrepreneurs with satellite capabilities. In 2017, Cantrell signed a letter of intent to collaborate with his son's cryptocurrency company, called Nexus, that was attempting to develop a satellite-supported currency exchange system. In 2016 York Space Systems signed a $60 million launch deal with Vector, to launch six satellites into orbit, which was never funded.

By August 2016, Vector had tested hardware in suborbital flight with the launch of its P-20 prototype rocket, as well as atmospheric test flights of the Vector-R from the Mojave Air and Space Port in California and Spaceport Camden in Georgia.

By 2017, Vector had announced that it planned to use the LC-46 launch site in Florida for its Vector-R rocket starting in 2018, but did not achieve that target date. Additionally Vector was investigating adding more minimal infrastructure launch pads either located on land in the USA using mobile semi-trailers as tank trucks and a transporter erector launcher (TEL), or to launch the rocket from barges on the ocean.

By February 2018, the company was planning to launch the first orbital flight of the Vector-R in July 2018 from the Pacific Spaceport Complex – Alaska. As of 2017, the first launch of the Vector-H was expected to occur in 2019.

On August 7, 2019, the company was awarded its first U.S. Air Force mission, to launch the ASLON-45 spacecraft for $3.4 million. However, the contract was cancelled when the US Air Force determined Vector did not meet minimum requirements for solvency.

On August 9, 2019, Cantrell left Vector Launch and John Garvey assumed the role of CEO. The future of the company was left uncertain as it reportedly faced serious financial problems.

=== Bankruptcy ===
On December 13, 2019, Vector Launch Inc. and one affiliated company filed Chapter 11 bankruptcy in the United States District Court for the District of Delaware. It was revealed that the August layoffs had been precipitated by the withdrawal of financial support by Sequoia Capital, one of the company's largest investors, which led other potential investors to back out of an upcoming funding round in a domino effect. Vector has filed a motion with the court for approval to sell its assets pursuant to Section 363 of the US bankruptcy code (a provision that allows for the orderly sale of assets from a bankrupt estate). The stalking horse bidder is Lockheed Martin. Lockheed Martin acquired Vector's GalacticSky assets by default after a bankruptcy court received no qualified bids. Another bidder acquired the remaining launch vehicle assets.

On October 29, 2020, Vector re-emerged with a new CEO to focus the company on suborbital and orbital flight.

=== Post-bankruptcy ===
On October 29, 2020, Robert Spalding announced that Vector Launch is "focused on suborbital, and eventually orbital flight" and is targeting both the governmental and commercial sectors.

On January 11, 2021, Vector's remaining shareholders unanimously voted on a wind down plan.

On October 11, 2022, Vector announced their renewed focus on national security related missions as well as the addition of Shaun Coleman, Vector's original investor and former General Manager of GalacticSky to their new board of directors

On March 7, 2023, U.S. Rocket engine provider Ursa Major Technologies announced that they would supply several 5,000-pound thrust "Hadley" engines to power the main stage of Vector-R launch vehicles to demonstrate capabilities for future national security missions.

=== Acquisition by Former CEO ===
On February 26, 2026, it was announced that Vector Launch would be acquired by Phantom Space, headed by the original CEO of Vector Launch, Jim Cantrell, for an undisclosed eight-figure range. Jim Cantrell told media that "~80% of the assets acquired would help Phantom accelerate the development of its Daytona rocket". Reported assets in the acquisition include:

- Communication and launch control equipment;
- Ground support equipment;
- Engineering data and patents, tooling equipment, and Vector's inventory of parts;
- Test rocket vehicle and multiple engines.

== Services ==
=== Launchers ===
The company plans to provide launch services with two rockets, the smaller Vector-R, and the larger Vector-H. Both rockets use a single engine for their second stage and a cluster of engines (three in the Vector-R and six in the Vector-H) for their first stage, all of which use LOX and propylene as propellants.

Vector planned to recover the first stage of its rockets for reuse. Other notable design features include a carbon fiber structure, some 3D printed engine parts, minimal infrastructure launch pads, and a fast launch cadence, which the company had hoped to reach 100 launches per year. The first client of Vector was Iceye, a company in Finland.

=== GalacticSky ===
Vector developed a patented software-defined satellite operating system called GalacticSky so that its planned micro-satellites can run different applications. Managed by Vector's initial investor and co-founder Shaun Coleman GalacticSky was intended to allow customers to quickly test software applications for satellites without having to develop their own hardware. Over 40 patents were issued for GalacticSky and its capabilities Following a lawsuit filed by Vector against Lockheed Martin for violating GalacticSky patents and Vector's bankruptcy, Lockheed Martin expressed interest in acquiring GalacticSky for $2.5 million, assuming no higher bidder appears.

Several members of the former GalacticSky team including the primary author of many of its patents and a Vector co-founder, chief sales/marketing officer and SVP/general manager of GalacticSky, Shaun Coleman, former GalacticSky VP of engineering John Metzger, former Vector chief revenue officer, and Lockheed VP of Advanced programs Robert Cleave have since founded NewSpace Networks, a company focused on extending the cloud and making satellite networks more efficient. NewSpace Networks intends to bid for the GalacticSky assets against Lockheed Martin. Ultimately the GalacticSky technology was acquired by Lockheed Martin.

== See also ==
- Firefly Aerospace – American aerospace company
- PLD Space – Private Spanish launch services provider
- Relativity Space – American launch vehicle manufacturer
- Rocket Lab – American public spaceflight company
- bluShift Aerospace
