= James Cantrell =

James Cantrell may refer to:

- Jim Cantrell, American entrepreneur, mechanical engineer and road racer
- Jimmy Cantrell (1882–1960), English footballer
