= Vector-R =

Two stage Launch vehicle, 60 kg payload to LEO

- Function: Small satellite launch vehicle
- Manufacturer: Vector Launch
- Country of origin: United States
- Cost per launch: 2–3 million USD

Size
- Height: 12 m
- Diameter: 1.2 m
- Mass: 5,000 kg
- Stages: 2/3

Capacity

Payload to LEO
- Mass: 60 kg

Payload to SSO
- Mass: 26 kg

Associated rockets
- Family: Vector (rocket family)
- Derivative work: Vector-H
- Comparable: Electron, Falcon 1, Firefly Alpha

Launch history
- Status: Active
- Launch sites: Mojave Air and Space Port; Spaceport Camden; Pacific Spaceport Complex – Alaska (planned); MARS Pad OB (planned); Spaceport Florida Launch Complex 46 (planned)
- Total launches: 2
- Success(es): 2
- Failure: 0

First stage
- Diameter: 1.2 m (3 ft 11 in)
- Powered by: 3 X Hadley
- Maximum thrust: 15,000 lbf (67,000 N)
- Propellant: Kerosene / LOX

Second stage
- Diameter: .635 m (2 ft 1.0 in)
- Powered by: 1 X LP-2
- Maximum thrust: 1,000 lbf (4,400 N)
- Burn time: 433 seconds
- Propellant: Propylene / LOX

Vector-R (Vector Rapid) is a two-stage orbital expendable launch vehicle under development by the American aerospace company Vector Launch to cover the commercial small satellite launch segment (CubeSats). Vector Launch went bankrupt in December 2019 and re-emerged in October 2020. Two prototypes were launched in 2017.

The rocket completed a maiden test flight at low altitude in May 2017. Vector Launch was planning the maiden orbital launch from the Pacific Spaceport Complex in Alaska in 2019, but paused operation in August 2019 due to an uncertain financing situation.

An upgraded version of the Vector-R, called the Vector-H (Heavy), is in development as well.

== Design ==
Vector-R plans to use two stages with a 1.2-meter (3.9 ft) diameter first stage and 0.635-meter (2.08 ft) diameter second stage, both filled with propylene/LOX propellant. The main body of the rocket will be constructed using a lightweight carbon composite material.

The launch vehicle's first stage was to be powered by three LP-1 LOX/propylene engines, delivering 81,000 newtons of force. The second stage was to be powered by one LP-2 LOX/propylene engine, delivering 4,400 newtons of force. The engines used a 3D-printed engine injector, designed with help from NASA's Science, Technology and Mission Directorate (STMD) Flight Opportunities program. This allows the injector to be produced as a single piece of hardware, instead of as individual components.

Vector was aiming the rocket at a launch cadence of 100 vehicles per year.

=== Block 0.1 ===
The first two sub-orbital flight tests used the Vector-R Block 0.1 prototype model, which was a full size aluminum air-frame of the Vector-R but with only one first stage engine.

=== Vector-RE1 ===
The Vector-RE1, a planned variant, was planned to use the same body as the standard Vector-R but include an electric powered third stage.

== Intended usage ==
Vector-R was designed to launch a 60 kg (130 lb) payload to a 1,000 km (620 mi) Sun-synchronous orbit, suitable for CubeSats and other small satellites. The cost per launch was planned to be less than US$3 million, a price point that the company hoped would have allowed it to attract one hundred launches per year. Customers could have chosen to encapsulate their spacecraft in payload fairings provided by the company, which could be attached to the rocket shortly before launch, in several different configurations, such as fitting CubeSats dispensers or multiple satellites in a single fairing.

Vector used on-site payload integration for the early launches. However it was expected to be able to integrate payloads at their Arizona and California payload facilities and ship them to their launch sites.

== Launch sites ==
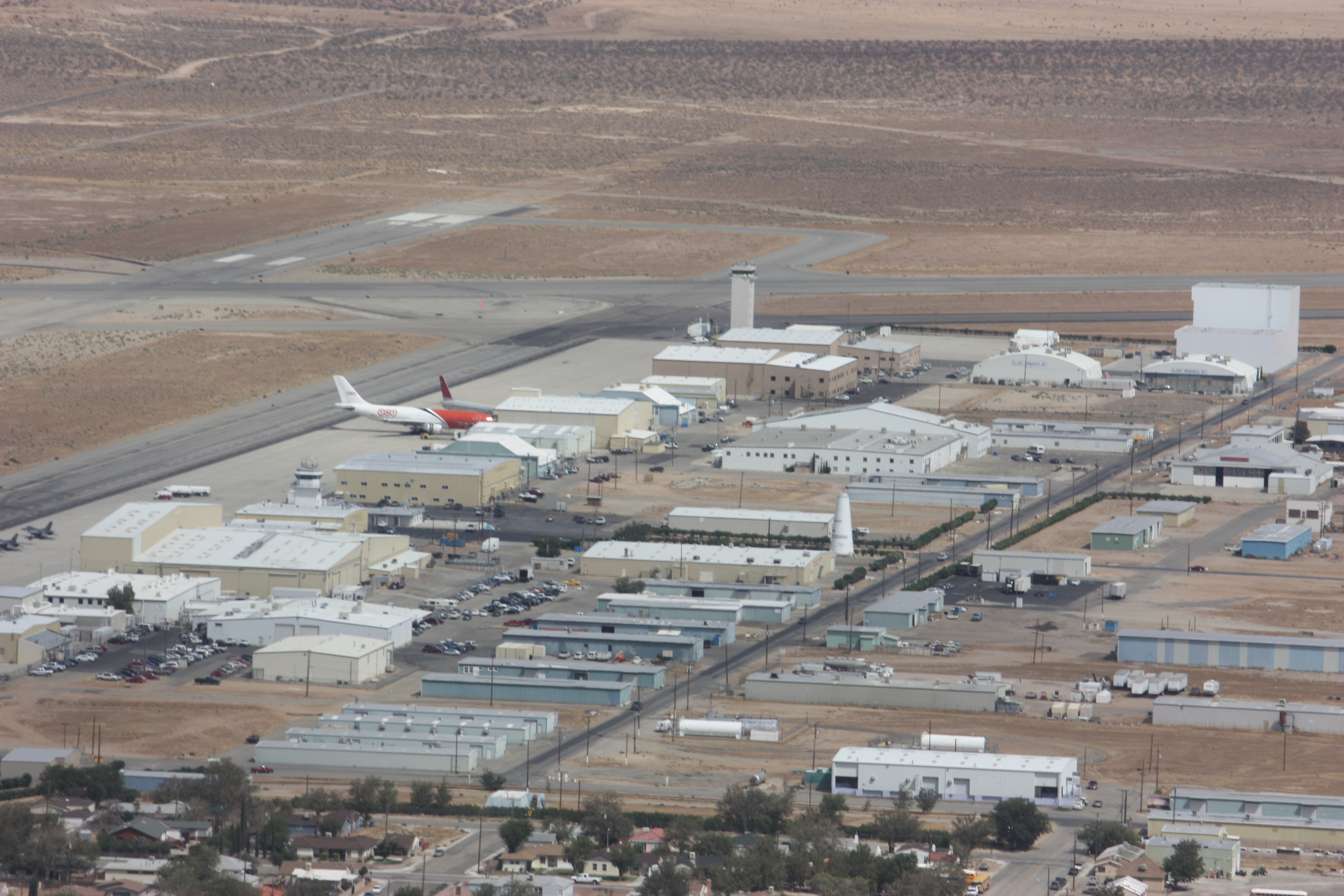
Mojave Spaceport

Vector-R launched from the Mojave Air and Space Port and Spaceport Camden for its flight tests. It had completed one test flight from each pad. Flight B0.002 was also the first launch from Spaceport Camden.

Vector planned to use the LC-46 launch site in Florida and the Mid-Atlantic Regional Spaceport (MARS) Pad 0B for the Vector-R rocket, with the first all-up launches would have occurred from MARS Pad 0B. Additionally, Vector investigated adding more minimal infrastructure launch pads either located on land in the US, or to launch the rocket from barges on the ocean.

Vector had planned for the maiden orbital launch from Kodiak Spaceport Launch Complex earlier in 2019.

== Launch statistics ==
Two low altitude suborbital test flights were performed in 2017.

=== Launch sites ===
- Mojave
- Camden

=== Launch outcomes ===
- Failure
- Partial failure
- Success
- Scheduled

== Launch history ==
Flight №	Date / time (UTC)	Rocket configuration	Launch site	Payload	Payload mass	Orbit	Customer	Launch outcome
B0.001	3 May 2017; 19:00	Vector-R (P-19H)	Mojave	None	—	Sub-orbital	Vector Launch	Success
B0.001	Flight test; maiden flight of the Vector-R; first engineering test, scaled down version; scheduled altitude 4,500 feet (1,400 m).							
B0.002	2 August 2017; 16:15	Vector-R	Camden	Two customer payloads.		Sub-orbital	Astro Digital	Success
B0.002	Flight test; full prototype version, upgraded flight systems; the launch was delayed due to ignition detection failure; launch took place from a trailer; the peak altitude was about 5,000 ft (1,500 m).							

== Planned launches ==
Due to the bankruptcy and subsequent re-emergence of Vector, These launches are uncertain.

Date / time (UTC)	Rocket configuration	Launch site	Payload	Orbit	Customer
TBA	Vector-R	TBA	TBA	LEO?	TBA
TBA	B1001; First launch since re-emergence of bankruptcy.				
TBA	Vector-R	Camden		Sub-orbital	Vector Launch
TBA	B0.003; Flight-Test; Testing fairings, avionics, and thrust vector control				
TBA	Vector-R	PSCA	Unicorn 2A; Delfi-PQ 1	LEO	Alba Orbital; Delft University of Technology
TBA	First orbital and commercial flight of the Vector-R. PocketQube launch.				
TBA	Vector-R	MARS LP-0B / PSCA	Landmapper-HD	LEO	Astro Digital
TBA	Earth observation				
TBA	Vector-R				Open Cosmos

== See also ==
- Small-lift launch vehicle
