= Hadley engine =

Rocket engine

Hadley
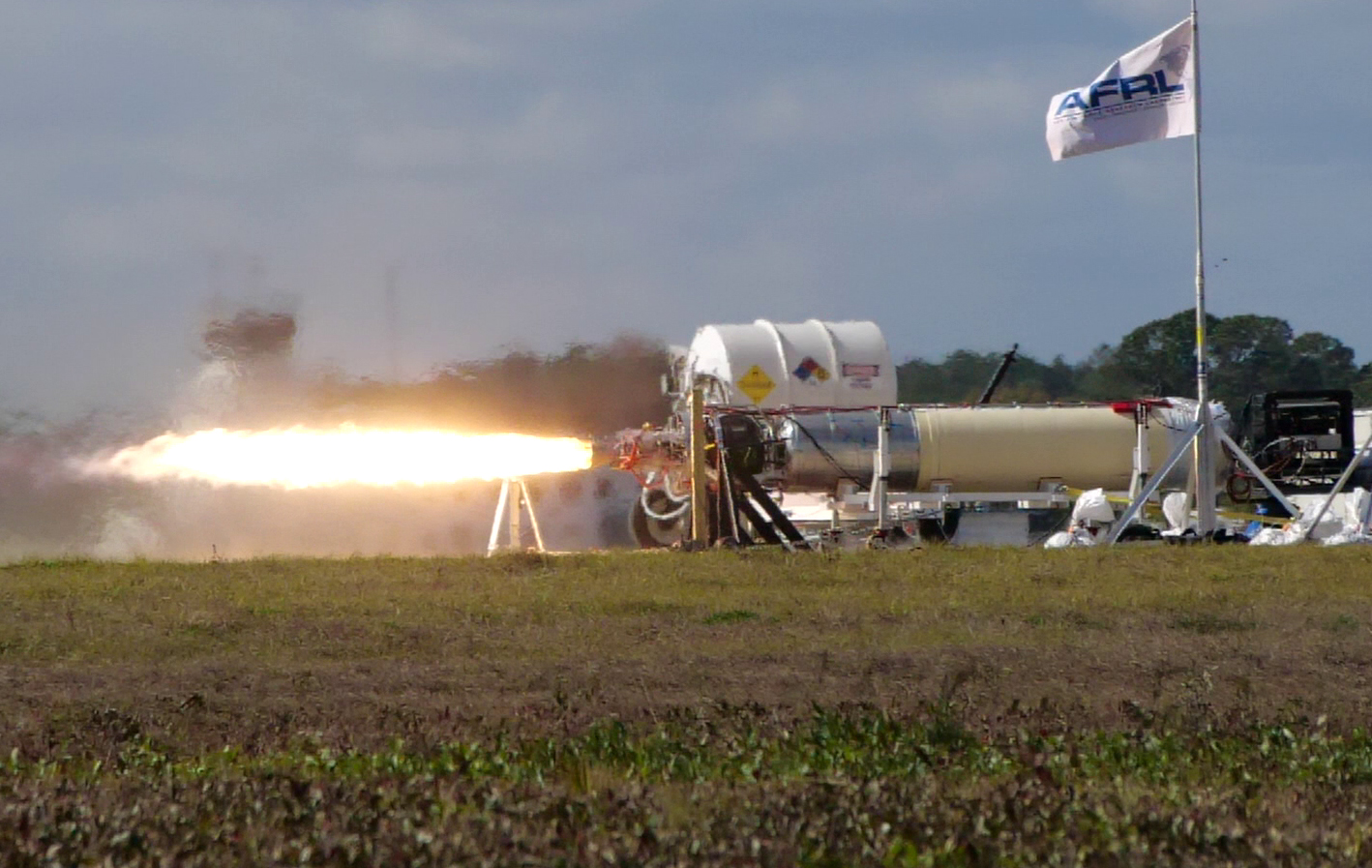
- AFRL Hadley Hotfire Test
- Country of origin: United States
- Designer: Ursa Major Technologies
- Status: Initial Production

Liquid-fuel engine
- Propellant: LOX / Kerosene
- Cycle: Staged combustion

Performance
- Thrust, sea-level: 5,000 lbf (22 kN)

The Ursa Major Technologies Hadley is a 22-kilonewton (5,000 lbf) thrust Kerosene/LOX oxidizer-rich staged combustion cycle rocket engine.

== History ==
Hadley is the first engine developed by Ursa Major Technologies. It started development in 2015, and prototypes were test fired in 2018.

In March 2022 qualification of the engine was complete and flight-ready engines had been delivered to customers.

In March 2024 Stratolaunch Systems announced completion of the first powered flight of the Talon-A test vehicle, TA-1. Hadley is the engine powering Talon-A.

Another initial customer, Phantom Space Corporation, plans to use Hadley on their Daytona small-lift rocket.

ABL Space Systems initially announced they would use the Hadley engine for the upper-stage of their RS1 rocket, but have subsequently decided to use an internally-developed engine called E2.

In April 2023, Astra suggested the vacuum variant of the Hadley engine would power the second stage of their Rocket 4.0 launch vehicle.

== Users ==
- Stratolaunch Systems
  - Talon-A
- Phantom Space Corporation
  - Daytona
- Astra
  - second stage of Rocket 4.0
- Generation Orbit Launch Services
  - X-60
