= Vector-H =

- Function: Smallsat launcher
- Manufacturer: Vector Launch
- Country of origin: United States
- Cost per launch: 3.5–4.5 Million USD

Size
- Height: 19.5 m (64 ft)
- Diameter: 1.2 m (3 ft 11 in)
- Mass: 11,910 kg (26,260 lb)
- Stages: 2/3

Capacity

Payload to LEO
- Mass: 290 kg (640 lb)

Payload to SSO
- Mass: 95 kg (209 lb)

Associated rockets
- Family: Vector (rocket family)
- Comparable: Electron, Falcon 1, Firefly Alpha, Prime, Miura 5

Launch history
- Status: Canceled
- Launch sites: Pacific Spaceport Complex – Alaska (planned); Spaceport Camden (planned); Spaceport Florida Launch Complex 46 (planned)

First stage
- Diameter: 1.2 m (3 ft 11 in)
- Powered by: 6 x LP-1
- Maximum thrust: 39,336 lbf (174,980 N)
- Propellant: Propylene / LOX

Second stage
- Diameter: 1.2 m (3 ft 11 in)
- Powered by: 1 X LP-3
- Maximum thrust: 1,135 lbf (5,050 N)
- Propellant: Propylene / LOX

Third stage
- Diameter: 1.2 m (3 ft 11 in)
- Propellant: Solid fuel

Vector-H (Vector Heavy) was a planned two-stage or three-stage orbital expendable launch vehicle in development by the American aerospace company Vector Launch to cover the commercial small satellite launch segment (CubeSats). It was planned to be an expanded version of the Vector-R rocket, more than doubling the payload capacity. After Vector Launch ceased operations in December 2019, the future development of the rocket is unofficially canceled.

== Design ==
Vector-H would have used two stages, both 1.2 m in diameter, filled with Propylene/LOX propellant. The main body of the rocket was planned to be constructed using a lightweight carbon composite material.

The launch vehicle's first stage would have been powered by six LP-1 LOX/propylene engines, delivering 81,000 newtons of force. The second stage would have been powered by one LP-3 LOX/propylene engine, delivering 4,400 newtons of force. The engines used a 3D-printed engine injector, designed with help from NASA's Science, Technology and Mission Directorate (STMD) Flight Opportunities program. This allows the injector to be produced as a single piece of hardware, instead of as individual components. The vehicle was also planned to include an optional third stage powered by a solid rocket motor. This would have allowed the upper stage to boost micro satellites into a higher orbit.

=== Vector-HE1 ===
The Vector-HE1 planned variant was to have the same body as the standard Vector-H but include an electric powered third stage.

== Intended usage ==
Vector-H was designed to launch a 95 kg (210 lb) payload to a 450 km (280 mi) Sun-synchronous orbit, suitable for CubeSats and other small payloads. The cost would have been less than US$5 million, a price point that the company hoped will allow it to attract one hundred launches per year. Customers could have choose to encapsulate their spacecraft in payload fairings provided by the company, which could be easily attached to the rocket shortly before launch, in several different configurations, such as fitting CubeSats dispensers or multiple satellites in a single fairing.

Vector would have used on-site payload integration for the early launches. However it expected to be able to integrate payloads at their Arizona and California Payload Facilities and ship them to their launch sites.

== Launch sites ==
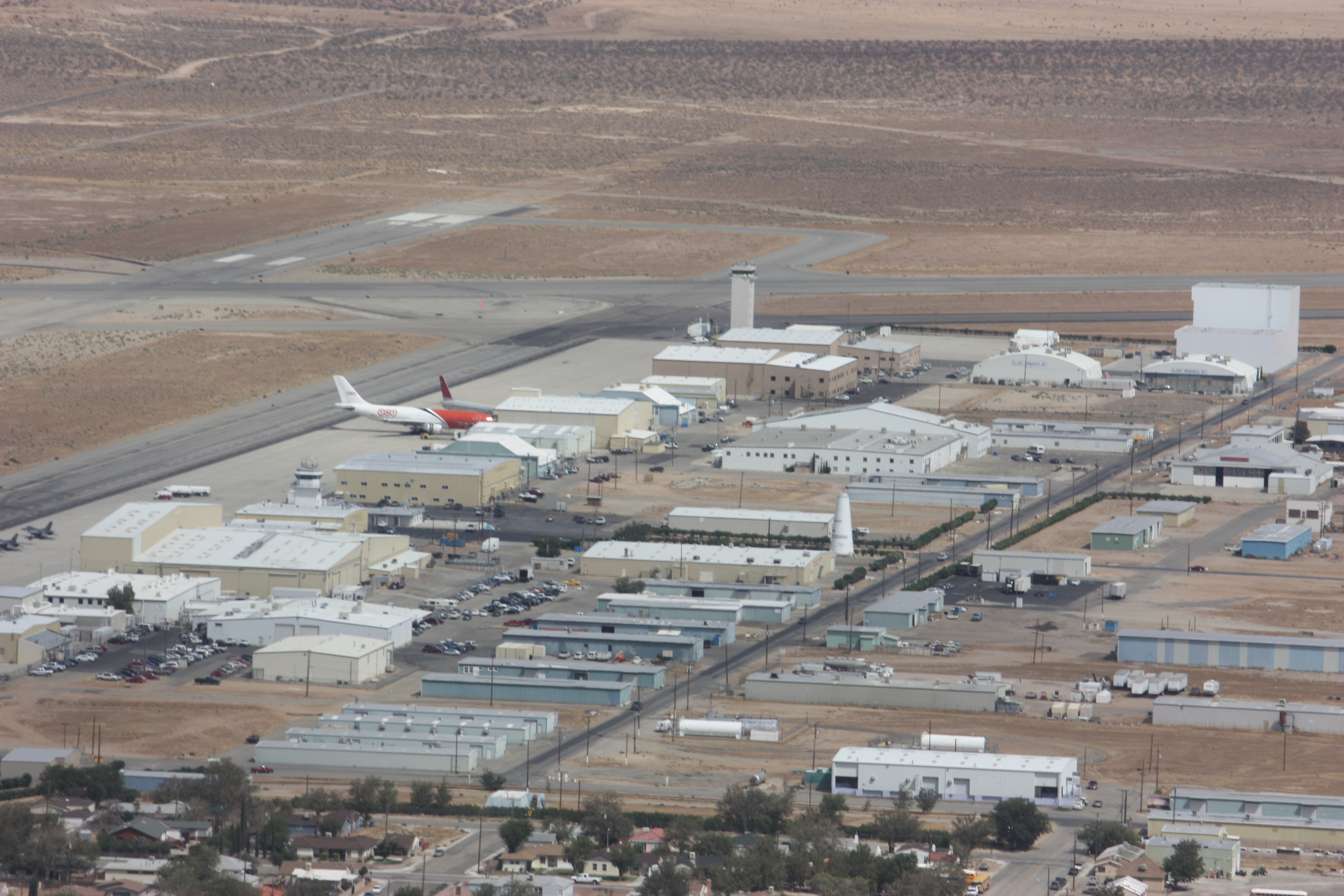
Mojave Spaceport

Vector Space planned to use the LC-46 launch site in Florida, Spaceport Camden, and Pacific Spaceport Complex. Additionally Vector Space investigated adding more minimal infrastructure launch pads either located on land in the US, or to launch the rocket from barges on the ocean.

== See also ==
- Small-lift launch vehicle
