= Nebula (company) =

Nebula Inc
- Type: Private
- Industry: Cloud Computing
- Founded: Menlo Park, California, United States (March 25, 2011)
- Founder: Chris C. Kemp, Devin Carlen, Steve O'Hara
- Defunct: (April 1, 2015)
- Headquarters: Mountain View, California, U.S.
- Website: Nebula.com (archive)

Nebula, Inc. was a hardware and software company with offices in Mountain View, California, and Seattle, Washington, USA. Nebula developed Nebula One, a cloud computing hardware appliance that turned racks of standard servers into a private cloud. The Nebula One private cloud system was built on the OpenStack open source cloud framework, as well as many other open source software projects.

== History ==
Nebula was founded as Fourth Paradigm Development in March 2011 by former NASA Ames Research Center chief technology officer Chris C. Kemp, long-time colleague Devin Carlen, entrepreneur Steve O'Hara, with software engineer Tres Henry, formerly at Amazon Web Services and author of the AWS Console, named as the head of User Experience.

In May 2011, Nebula closed a round of series A investment led by Kleiner Perkins Caufield & Byers and Highland Capital Partners, with participation from Google's first three investors—Andy Bechtolsheim, Ram Shriram, and David Cheriton, as well as other investors.

In the summer of 2012, eight members of the original Anso Labs (acquired by Rackspace) and NASA team that originally wrote components of the OpenStack project joined Nebula.

In the fall of 2012, Nebula closed a $25 million series B investment led by Comcast Ventures and Highland Capital, and Google executive Eric Schmidt’s venture fund Innovation Endeavors became an investor.

In March 2013, Nebula was named one of CIO.com 10 Hot Cloud Companies to Watch. Nebula One, was made generally available on April 2, 2013.

On April 1, 2015 the company announced on its website and confirmed on Twitter that it was ceasing operations.
