= Airborne Launch Assist Space Access =

Cancelled U.S. defense technology

Airborne Launch Assist Space Access, or DARPA ALASA is a canceled program of the US defense technology agency DARPA "designed to produce a rocket capable of launching a 100-pound satellite into low Earth orbit for less than $1 million." The program was conceived, then announced in 2011, and funded development work began in 2012. The project was terminated in late 2015.

== Background ==
Traditional launch methods of satellites are too costly to put small payloads into orbit without a larger payload accompanying it to make the launch worth the expense. Current launches of sub-100-pound satellites are performed as "piggyback payloads" on launches of much larger spacecraft, usually headed for geostationary orbit, and are released at the altitude of the primary payload. In addition, range costs of operating from ground-based infrastructure have escalated as they have aged, accounting for up to 35 percent of the launch cost. This restricts the number of light satellite launches to 10–12 per year, which could be increased if small payloads could be launched into space affordably and without ground range constraints. Air-launching satellites was first seriously considered during the 1950s and 1960s, but small payloads in the 100-pound class at the time did not have effective capabilities, so the method was overlooked. The first air-launched rocket to put a satellite into orbit was the Orbital Sciences Corporation Pegasus, which did it on 13 June 1990; however, it is currently deployed from a heavily modified and expensive Lockheed L-1011 airliner. The ALASA program's objective is to use an unmodified aircraft platform (except for software) that does not have to be dedicated to the mission to place a 100 lb satellite into orbit that requires only 24 hours notice to integrate and launch the payload, with the ability to re-plan the launch in flight and relocate the aircraft to any civilian airport or military airfield in a crisis situation, while using onboard GPS/inertial position reporting rather than ground-based radar tracking.

== History ==
A program solicitation was announced in 2011, and six companies were awarded contracts in July 2012. The six awardees who signed phase 1 contracts with DARPA included:

- Boeing– system concept
- Lockheed Martin – design utilizes a "tactical aircraft to provide a high energy-state, reusable first stage, enabling launches from bases worldwide"
- Northrop Grumman
- Space Information Laboratories – is "providing three key enabling technologies that could be used in multiple launch systems, including GPS Metric Track, Autonomous Flight Termination System (AFTS) and Space Based Range to reduce range launch cost."
- Ventions – second stage launch vehicle
- Virgin Galactic – utilizes its existing WhiteKnight2 carrier aircraft

In the first phase, Boeing, Lockheed Martin and Virgin Galactic were funded to explore different ALASA system concepts while Northrop Grumman, Space Information Laboratories and Ventions were contracted to work on enabling technologies that could be used by any or all of the system teams.

In December 2012, DARPA announced that the ALASA program would provide the launch vehicle booster for another DARPA program that is intending to release a "constellation of 24 micro-satellites (~20 kilograms (44 lb) range) each with 1-meter imaging resolution."

In May 2013, DARPA requested US$40 million for a second year of ALASA program funding in spring 2013.

In March 2014, Boeing won the large US$32–104 million phase 2 ALASA contract from DARPA. Boeing will use their F-15E Strike Eagle fighter to carry the ALASA rocket up to 12,000 m (39,000 ft), then release the 7.3 m (24 ft) rocket to ignite and carry itself into orbit. Using a modified fighter-jet to launch the rocket would increase satellite launch sites from four locations (Cape Canaveral Air Force Station, Florida; Vandenberg Air Force Base, California; Wallops Flight Facility, Virginia; and Kodiak Island, Alaska) to any available runway. The cost to put a 45 kg (99 lb) microsatellite into orbit is targeted at $1 million, a decrease of 66 percent. A demonstration launch was hoped for in FY 2015.

The F-15E launch vehicle would have required no modifications to launch the ALASA payload, not even software, because the rocket will use the same communications protocols as a typically mounted weapons system. This enables the aircraft to continue flying other missions as a cost benefit over being specialized. The rocket will also feature new design technologies to lower complexity and costs. It will be powered by a monopropellant, a combination of nitrous oxide and acetylene, and mixed together in one propellant tank slightly below room temperature; the propellant choice is a dramatic simplification of the complexity of the rocket vehicle. Rocket design is also unconventional, mounting the four engines for the first stage at the front rather than rear. DARPA plans to develop a second, smaller launch system called the Small Air Launch Vehicle to Orbit (SALVO) to understand operations cost, demonstrate new technologies like battery-powered pumps for the rocket's engines, and provide overall program before ALASA is launched. SALVO was planned to launch in spring 2015, six to nine months before the first ALASA flight in late 2015. 12 flights were to be conducted through mid-2016 from Eglin Air Force Base, Florida over the Atlantic Ocean.

By June 2015, DARPA and the Air Force had reportedly began SALVO flights, potentially having already commenced them to counter Chinese and Russian electronic and infrared surveillance; this could mean ALASA would give the U.S. a "stealth satellite launch" capability.

== Budget ==
The program had a budget of "US$46 million for the 18-month first phase through September 2013, when [DARPA] planned another competition to select at least one team to conduct up to 36 launches in 2015 [in order to] to demonstrate [the Alasa system] at a persuasive scale." US$40 million has been requested for the second year.

== Competition ==
After DARPA announced in December 2012 that the ALASA air-launched microsat launch vehicle would be chosen to launch the DARPA SeeMe program micro-satellites, some questions arose as to why other commercial options currently in development were not considered, such as the Virgin Galactic LauncherOne and the XCOR Aerospace Lynx.

== Termination ==
DARPA terminated the program in late 2015, due to safety concerns with the unique monopropellant, NA-7, which exploded in two ground tests. It was reported that development of the propellant would continue, as would efforts to apply technologies developed in the program.

== See also ==
- Air launch to orbit
- XS-1 (spacecraft)
- Astra Rocket
