= Torpor Inducing Transfer Habitat For Human Stasis To Mars =

Hibernation system

Torpor Inducing Transfer Habitat For Human Stasis To Mars is a hibernation system proposed by SpaceWorks Engineering in 2013. The proposed system would significantly reduce the cost of a human expedition to Mars by placing the crew in extended torpor for 90 days to 6 months. Traveling during hibernation would reduce astronauts' metabolic functions as well as minimize requirements for life support during multi-missions.
