= SpaceWorks Enterprises =

Aerospace company in Atlanta, United States

SpaceWorks Enterprises, Inc. (SEI)
- Type: Private
- Industry: Aerospace
- Founded: Atlanta, Georgia (August 1, 2000)
- Headquarters: Atlanta, Georgia
- Key people: John E. Bradford, PhD; Chief Executive Officer Jon Wallace; Chief Operating Officer; Brad St. Germain; Chief Technical Officer; Chris Stroumpis; Chief Financial Officer John R. Olds, PhD; Chair and Founder
- Products: Aerospace engineering services and software
- Brands: SpaceWorks Engineering; SpaceWorks Commercial; SpaceWorks Software
- Number of employees: 60+
- Subsidiaries: Generation Orbit Launch Services, Inc. (GO); Terminal Velocity Aerospace, LLC (TVA); Blink Astro, LLC (Blink)
- Website: spaceworks.aero

SpaceWorks Enterprises, Inc. (SEI) is an aerospace engineering company based in Atlanta, Georgia, United States that specializes in the design, assessment, hardware prototyping and flight demonstration of advanced space concepts for both government and commercial customers.

== History ==
SEI was founded in 2000 by Dr. John R. Olds, then a tenured professor in the school of aerospace engineering at the Georgia Institute of Technology in Atlanta, GA.^{,} The firm was previously known as SpaceWorks Engineering, Inc. and officially changed its name in 2011. Dr. Olds stepped down as CEO of SEI in August 2022; Dr. John Bradford assumed the role, while Dr. Olds remained as chair of the board of directors.

In 2011, SEI was named the 39th fastest-growing engineering firm in the United States according to the 2011 Inc. 500/5000 list. SpaceWorks received the 2015 Georgia Small Business of the Year Award from the Georgia Chapter of the National Defense Industries Association on February 8, 2016.

== Overview ==
SpaceWorks Enterprises (SEI), based in Atlanta, Georgia, specializes in independent concept development, economic analysis, technology impact assessment, and systems analyses for future space systems and projects. Along with custom analyses, SEI develops software and apps for the aerospace field. The company created three subsidiary companies to support various business lines. These include Generation Orbit Launch Services, Inc. (GO), Terminal Velocity Aerospace, LLC (TVA), and Blink Astro, LLC (Blink).

SEI has six primary lines of business: SpaceWorks Flight, SpaceWorks Orbital, SpaceWorks Engineering, SpaceWorks Commercial, SpaceWorks Studios, and SpaceWorks Software.

=== Current Projects ===
- Analysis of the creation of a Torpor Inducing Transfer Habitat For Human Stasis To Mars. This project was originally funded through a NASA Innovative Advanced Concepts (NIAC) Phase I award. The NIAC award was featured in a number of online publications including the Air & Space Smithsonian magazine Space.com, Forbes, scientas.nl, and the Guardian Express. SEI continues to mature this concept and approach to support human exploration.
- Development and testing of Re-Entry Devices (RED), providing a lower-cost option for returning products and experiments from space. The project is partially funded through NASA’s Flight Opportunities Program and was recently featured on NASA’s website. It is SpaceWorks’ latest step towards fielding a full cargo return capability.
- Development and testing of RED-Rescue, an Air-launched Drone Delivery Device (AD3) for airmen rescue package delivery of a Personnel Recovery Kit (PRK). The project was awarded by the U.S. Air Force and its Air Force Research Laboratory (AFRL).
- Development of Mono-propellant deorbit stage (MPDS) designed to quickly and precisely deorbit space capsules such as RED-4U. A high-thrust chemical propulsion stage utilizing environmentally-friendly liquid propellants, MPDS was created to meet the requirements of current rideshare launchers. The MPDS will be capable of supporting a variety of emerging space tug missions in low Earth orbit including orbital debris cleanup, satellite servicing, satellite orbit raising, and support for private space stations.
- Development of the QuickShot™ trajectory simulation and optimization tool as a modern software package to replace legacy industry tools such as NASA's Program to Optimize Simulated Trajectories (POST) and Optimization Through Implicit Simulation (OTIS). The software is sold commercially.
- Development of REDTOP™ (Rocket Engine Design Tool for Optimal Performance) software allowing customers to experiment with factors that impact thrust, Isp, turbine speed, power balance, cost and other outputs while they design their own engine.
- Development of Manta™, software for high-speed propulsion for a supersonic combustion ramjet (scramjet). The software canprovide designers insight into performance characteristics while also delivering a geometry definition, which includes the inlet, isolator, combustor, and nozzle.
- Development of the NewSpace Index™, which compares the performance of a basket of publicly traded NewSpace companies to other indices.
- Commercialization of FuseBlox™, a patented docking and connection device for small satellites that provides a secure structural attachment, power connectivity, and data transfer to support the in-space economy. In 2016, SpaceWorks designed the device through funding from the Defense Advanced Research Projects Agency (DARPA). The project continued in 2020 under the Space Vehicles Directorate's Commercial Readiness Program (CRP) at the Air Force Research Laboratory (AFRL)
- Assessment of High-Speed Passenger Travel for the NASA Langley Research Center to study and evaluate economic prospects for commercial high-speed passenger flight. SpaceWorks Commercial will examine a range of aircraft configurations representative of the systems currently planned for development by the aerospace industry, considering such key design drivers as flight speed, operational range, passenger count, fuel type, ticket price, and fleet size.

=== Educational Outreach ===
- From 2013 - 2018, SEI hosted the ASTRO (Aerospace Summer Training & Research Opportunity) for local area high school students. This was in addition to college internships that are hosted year round. ASTRO was a project-oriented experience during which participants work in teams to solve an aerospace engineering design problem. The teams conducted research and solved complex aerospace engineering challenges created for them by SEI staff. Each team was charged with creating a PowerPoint presentation detailing their research, analysis, and solution to the challenge, a mission patch designed entirely by the team that reflected their work, and a prototype of their solution.
- SEI also developed a free interactive Astrodynamics Lab for use by teachers and educators. It is designed for students at both the high school and college level. Upon completion, students should have a basic proficiency and understanding of how gravitational fields influence the orbit of satellites.
- SpaceWorks STEM Student Engagement Program visited science and engineering classes at local high schools in the Atlanta area, discussed careers in aerospace, and demonstrated a hybrid rocket on site.

=== Previous Projects ===
- Participated on the Artemis Innovative Management Solutions team which worked to mature technologies and concepts for a space-based solar power system known as SPS-ALPHA. NASA Innovative Advanced Concepts (NIAC) sponsored the project.
- Created Blink® Satellite Radio, which connects with cube satellites to serve a variety of markets including precision agriculture (see AgriBlinkR), transportation, energy, environmental monitoring (see AquaBlinkR), and defense.
- Developed Re-Entry Device (RED)- Phoenix, a flight test solution for evaluating thermal protection materials and hot structures at hypersonic speeds. RED-Phoenix is a recoverable flight testbed designed to conduct testing of advanced leading edge materials, nose caps, sensor windows, and fins at relevant flight conditions.
- Created the Spaceport Field Guide (SpFG), which is a customized Google Map that identifies worldwide launch sites and associated facilities. SpFG is a free resource to the aerospace community. (Please note that SEI has attempted to compile and maintain accurate information, however no assertions are made as to the complete accuracy of this field guide. Users are encouraged to submit suggested updates and corrections to help evolve this resource.)
- Created and installed AgriBlinkR™, an outdoor Internet of Things (IoT) data logger and transmitter for precision agriculture use. Satellite-enabled, it provides farmers with one-stop global coverage and eliminates dead spots typical of cellular solutions.
- Created and tested AquaBlinkR™, an IoT sensor for fresh and salt water monitoring using low-Earth-orbit satellite communication. It is a low power device capable of capturing and measuring global position along with air and water temperature from on-board sensors. Constructed with a power-saving HyperSleep™ mode to conserve battery power and maximize lifetime.
- Created and tested Re-Entry Device (RED)-Data2, a small device that serves as affordable, expendable test beds to study thermal protection system performance and high speed flight dynamics upon reentry from Earth orbit. The first space flight of the RED-Data2 capsules took place in 2017.
- Presented “Performance and Business Case Impact Assessment for Launch Systems Utilizing RDRE Propulsion” at the 2022 IEEE Aerospace Conference. The paper presented the advantages of switching from current engine technology to a rotating detonation rocket engine (RDRE) for propulsion.
- Presented “Suborbital Drop Test to Demonstrate Autonomous Payload Recovery from Low Earth Orbit”, at the 2022 IEEE Aerospace Conference. The paper demonstrated through theory and practice how autonomous payload delivery capabilities will be used to make the return of space-based products more routine and cost efficient.
- Presented a paper titled "Cryogenic Propulsive Stages for Human Exploration beyond Low Earth Orbit" at the 2012 Global Space Exploration Conference (GLEX 2012) in Washington, DC. The paper summarizes the results of a six-month study that SEI performed for United Launch Alliance.
- Assisted Satrec Initiative Co., Ltd. (Satrec Initiative or SI) to market their products and services to United States customers through Satrec Initiative-US (SI-US). SpaceWorks represented SI in the U.S. and managed the SI-US initiative until 2012.
- Published the results of an internal study of a lunar lander concept to support missions from Earth-Moon L2 to the lunar surface.
- Founded the FastForward Project, an international study group investigating the commercial market for future high-speed point-to-point flight for passengers and/or cargo.
- Actively tracked the small satellite industry and provided projections based on the data that is collected. SEI annually published these projections for the < 50 kg market and provided custom market assessment to government and commercial customers for all satellite classes.
- Supported the Air Force on its RBS and Pathfinder efforts. SEI provided independent aerodynamic, trajectory, and propulsion analysis of competing RBS and Pathfinder approaches and also provided systems engineering and risk management support to AFRL's Chief Engineer for Pathfinder.
- Provided technical and graphics support to the 2010-2011 NASA-DARPA Horizontal Launch Study team. The HLS study explored near-term air launch concepts capable of launching medium payloads to space.^{,}
- Foresight, a small satellite mission concept developed by SEI, won The 2007 Planetary Society 99942 Apophis Mission Design Competition.^{,}
- Designed an asteroid mitigation mission concept referred to as MADMEN, or Modular Asteroid Deflection Mission Ejector Node, for use in planetary defense missions.^{,}
- Personnel from SEI provided engineering analysis to the Review of United States Human Space Flight Plans Committee.
- Supported NASA's Constellation Program via the Ares Project Office as a member of the Ducommon/Miltec team.
- Participated on the Orbital Sciences Corporation team for NASA's Concept Exploration and Refinement (CE&R) study.
- Supported the Northrop Grumman team on the first phase of the hypersonic weapon system development for the DARPA Falcon Project.
- Participated on the Coleman Research Corp. (L-3 Coleman Aerospace, since acquired by Aerojet Rocketdyne) team for DARPA's Responsive Access, Small Cargo, Affordable Launch (RASCAL) program.
- Served as a minor partner of Astrobotic Technology for the Google Lunar X Prize from 2009 to 2010.
