= Astra Space =

American aerospace company

Astra Space, Inc.

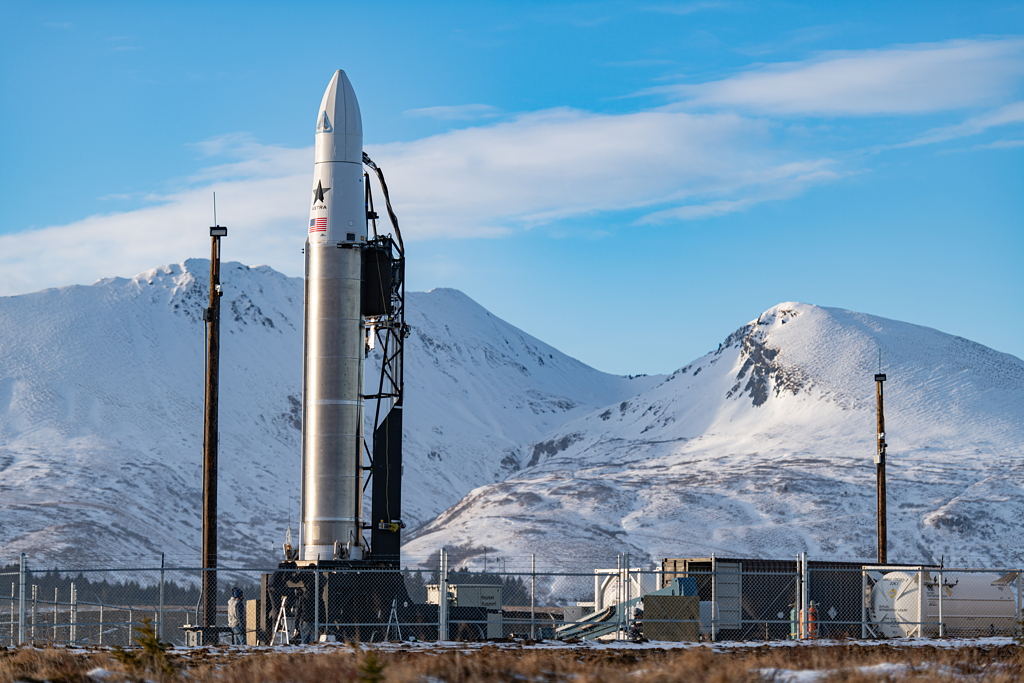
- Type: Private
- Industry: Aerospace
- Founded: October 2016; 10 years ago (ASTRA); 2005; 21 years ago (Ventions)
- Founder: Adam London; Chris Kemp
- Headquarters: Alameda, California, U.S.
- Key people: Chris Kemp (CEO); Adam London (CTO)
- Number of employees: 130 (2025)
- Website: astra.com

Astra Space, Inc., formerly known as Ventions, LLC from 2005 - 2016, is an American space company based in Alameda, California, with facilities in Atwater, California. The company was initially an aerospace technology research firm that focused on SBIR contracts, developing small rocket engines for use on launch vehicles and satellite propulsion. In 2012, the company shifted to developing launch vehicles and was selected for the DARPA ALASA program, eventually leading to the development and launch of the Astra Rocket series of launch vehicle utilizing both government and private funding after reincorporating itself to Astra Space, Inc. in 2016.

Astra developed and launched several sequential rocket series and successfully reached orbit in November 2021 with LV0007, after six previous failed attempts.

Astra became publicly traded in 2021 through a SPAC merger. The company acquired Apollo Fusion, an electric-propulsion engine manufacturer, the same year. The acquisition enabled Astra to continue development of a spacecraft engine using a Hall-effect thruster (HET), known as the Astra Spacecraft Engine. Astra sells these spacecraft engines for use on satellites for station-keeping, collision avoidance, and end-of-life de-orbiting.

After four test launches of versions 1.0, 2.0, and 3.0 of the Astra rocket, the company demonstrated orbital capability with version 3.2 of its design. Astra later conducted four commercial launches of version 3.3; two were not successful due to upper-stage issues. In 2022, Astra planned to increase the payload capacity of version 4.0 to around 600, compared with the 50 kg maximum capacity of version 3.0.

In November 2023, Astra’s co-founders proposed taking the company private, and in July 2024 Astra announced the completion of the take-private transaction.

In October 2024, Astra announced a U.S. Department of Defense contract valued at up to $44 million to support continued development of its mobile launch system and the 4.0 rocket.

== History ==
Astra was founded in October 2016 by Chris Kemp and Adam London.

In late 2016, Astra moved into a building on the former Naval Air Station Alameda known as “Orion” due to its location at 1690 Orion Street, Alameda, CA 94501. This former naval jet engine testing facility provided the ability to perform in-house single engine testing. Due to Naval Air Station Alameda's vast retired runways, the company was able to perform full vehicle testing very close to their headquarters, eliminating the need for expensive and complex logistics for rocket testing.

During early to mid 2019, most non-test related employees moved from the Orion building into a new building at 1900 Skyhawk Street, Alameda, CA 94501, known as "Skyhawk". This allowed a large expansion of a previously cramped machine shop, additional in house machining capabilities, and a rocket production line in anticipation of Rocket 3. Additionally, this building has a number of known chemical contaminants due to its history as a Naval jet engine overhaul facility (Building 360) and is now designated as part of Naval Air Station Alameda Superfund site.

Two suborbital test flights were conducted in 2018 from Pacific Spaceport Complex – Alaska (PSCA): one on 20 July 2018 (Rocket 1.0), and one on 29 November 2018 (Rocket 2.0). Both were stated to be launch failures by the Federal Aviation Administration. However, Astra stated that both were successful and the second one was "shorter than planned". Astra spent 2019 designing and building Rocket 3.0 integrating propulsion systems, avionics, and other pressurization/plumbing components into a high-performance electric pump-fed orbital launch vehicle.

From 2018 to 2020, Astra was a contender in the DARPA Launch Challenge; first, as one of three teams, although at this point Astra kept its involvement secret and was only referred to as "stealth startup" by the Challenge organizers. Then as the other two teams dropped out, Astra remained as the only team in the competition. The competition involved launching two small satellite payloads into orbit from two different launch sites in the U.S. with approximately two weeks between launches. Astra attempted to perform a launch for the Challenge in late February – early March 2020 from PSCA, but had to scrub the launch attempts (due to faulty sensor data) and in the end, did not launch a rocket for the Challenge. With the competition's only remaining team (Astra) being unable to launch a rocket within the set time frame, DARPA announced the DARPA Launch Challenge closed on 2 March 2020 with no winner. The prize of US$12 million went unclaimed.

On 23 March 2020, Astra's Rocket 3.0 ("1 of 3"), the vehicle that was initially intended to launch as Astra's first rocket for the DARPA Launch Challenge, but which failed to launch within the challenge's launch window and was subsequently reused for the next launch without DARPA involvement, suffered a fire on the launch pad (PSCA, Pad 3B) prior to launch, destroying the rocket. In September 2020, Astra attempted another orbital rocket launch, this time with their Rocket 3.1. The rocket cleared the launchpad and began to ascend before a failure caused all the engines to shut down. The vehicle began to quickly fall back down to Earth, exploding on impact. Next month, Astra was selected by the U.S. Air Force's AFWERX program to pursue the development of their Rocket 5.0, although it was not clear if the selection was tied to a specific monetary award. In the last month of 2020, Astra's Rocket 3.2 nearly (but did not) reached orbit after a launch from Kodiak Island, Alaska.

On 2 February 2021, Astra announced they planned to go public through a reverse merger with special-purpose acquisition company Holicity in a deal that valued the rocket company at a $2.1 billion enterprise value. Later in February, Astra announced the appointment of former Apple engineering leader Benjamin Lyon as its new chief engineer.

On 7 June 2021, Astra announced their plans to acquire electric propulsion system manufacturer Apollo Fusion for $50 million, with the purchase being triggered by the merger with Holicity.

In July, Astra completed its first day as a public company on the Nasdaq, the first publicly traded space launch and rocket company on the exchange.

On 4 August 2022, together with the release of the Q2 2022 financial results, Astra announced that following two out of the previous four Rocket 3.3 launches being unsuccessful, they intended to fully transition to the upgraded Rocket 4, whose maiden flight has been subsequently rescheduled to 2023. Because of this, all remaining Rocket 3.3 launches had been cancelled and the company began talks with its customers to remanifest their payloads on Rocket 4.

On 3 November, 2023, Astra disclosed in its U.S. Securities and Exchange Commission (SEC) filing that it defaulted on a $12.5 million debt financing agreement and could not assure it would be able to raise the necessary funds.

In November 2023, Astra founders, Chris Kemp and Adam London, proposed a plan to privatize the company by acquiring all the outstanding stock, according to a filing with the U.S. Securities and Exchange Commission. The stock was offered at $1.50 per share, a significant premium over the closing trading price. On 24 November, 2023, the company raised $2.7 million from existing investors to continue operations while it works out its long-term plan. In March 2024, Astra's board agreed for the company to be taken private by its co-founders at a $11.25 million valuation.

== Launch vehicles ==
Astra produced several launch vehicle designs. Rocket 1 was a single test vehicle, with five first stage "Delphin" engines and a mass simulator in place of a functional second stage. Rocket 2 was likewise a test vehicle without a second stage.

Rocket 3 was a 11.6 m (38 ft) launch vehicle that had an advertised payload capacity of 25–150 kg (55–331 lb) to a 500 km (310 mi) Sun-synchronous orbit. The rocket consisted of two stages. The first stage had five electric-pump-fed "Delphin" engines advertised at 6,500 lbf (29,000 N) of thrust each. The second stage had one pressure-fed "Aether" engine with 740 lbf (3,300 N) (vacuum) of thrust. The rocket was used as part of a project for the DARPA Launch Challenge, although challenge's deadline passed before any Rocket 3 launches. Launches of Rocket 3.0 and 3.1 resulted in failure, while Astra claimed success after Rocket 3.2 failed to reach orbit. Rocket 3.3 was larger than previous Rocket 3 variants, and multiple vehicles were produced and launched. Rocket 3.3 serial number LV0007 became Astra's first rocket to reach orbit. The final Rocket 3.3 produced, serial number LV0010, failed to launch the NASA TROPICS-1 mission.

=== Rocket 4 ===
Rocket 4 is a new rocket design, improving on capability and reliability compared to the outgoing Rocket 3 series. 18.9 m (62 ft) in height and 1.8 m (5.9 ft) in diameter, its planned payload capacity is 550 kg to a 300 km low Earth orbit or 350 kg to a 500 km sun-synchronous orbit. The first stage is designed around Chiron engines (modified Firefly Reaver engines) with a combined thrust of up to 80,000 lbf (360 kN), while the second stage propulsion is a Ursa Major Hadley ITV engine with a thrust of 6,500 lbf (29 kN). Astra aims to achieve a weekly launch cadence with this vehicle.

== Spacecraft engine ==
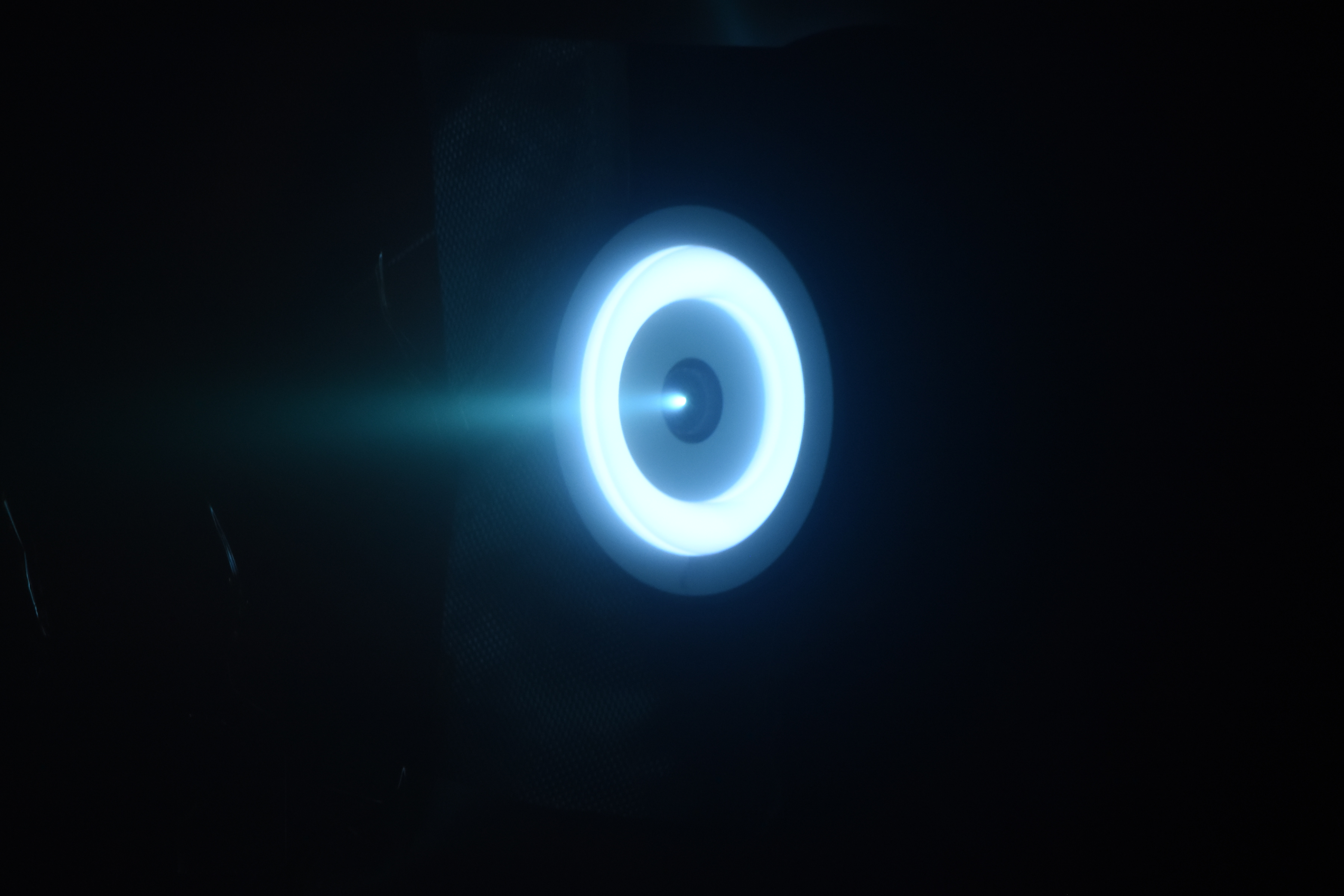
ASE hot fire test at Air Force Research Laboratory, Edwards Air Force Base

On June 7, 2021, Astra announced an acquisition of electric propulsion engine manufacturer Apollo Fusion and has continued manufacturing the Hall-effect thruster in-house. The engine utilizes krypton or xenon propellant for a total impulse of 200-300 kN-s and has been integrated with several customer payloads that have launched to orbit. The spacecraft engine system consists of a thruster, power processing unit, feed system, and propellant tank.

== See also ==
- Astra Rocket
