= TROPICS (spacecraft constellation) =

NASA mission

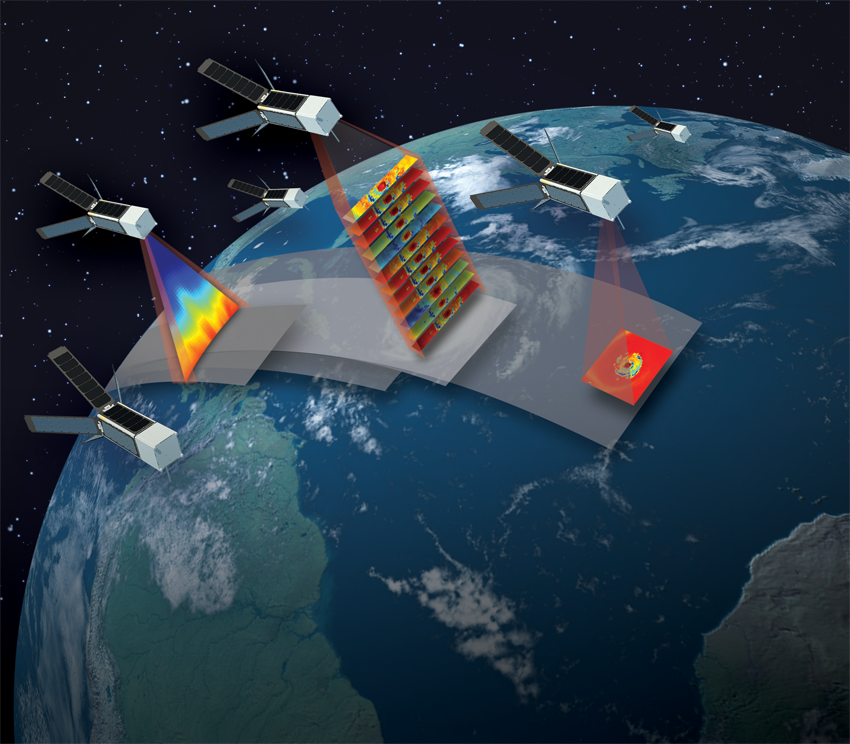
- TROPICS satellites
- Mission type: Earth observation
- Operator: NASA
- Website: science.nasa.gov/missions/tropics
- Mission duration: 1 year (planned); Satellites 1 & 2: 0 days (final); Satellites 3 & 4: 2 years, 6 months and 2 days (elapsed); Satellites 5 & 6: 2 years, 5 months and 15 days (elasped)

Spacecraft properties
- Spacecraft: TROPICS
- Spacecraft type: 3U CubeSat
- Bus: Blue Canyon Technologies
- Manufacturer: MIT Lincoln Laboratory
- Launch mass: 5.34 kg (11.8 lb)
- Dimensions: 10 × 10 × 36 cm (3.9 × 3.9 × 14.2 in)

Start of mission
- Launch date: 1st launch: 12 June 2022 (failure); 2nd launch: 8 May 2023 (successful); 3rd launch: 26 May 2023 (successful)
- Rocket: Rocket 3.3, Electron
- Launch site: Cape Canaveral SLC-46, Mahia LC-1
- Contractor: Astra Space, Rocket Lab

End of mission
- Decay date: Satellites 1 & 2: 12 June 2022 (launch failure)

Orbital parameters
- Reference system: Geocentric orbit (planned)
- Regime: Low Earth Orbit
- Altitude: 550 km
- Inclination: 32.00°
- Period: 95.00 minutes

Instruments
- Microwave radiometer
- Earth System Science Pathfinder

TROPICS (Time-Resolved Observations of Precipitation structure and storm Intensity with a Constellation of Smallsats) is a NASA constellation of four identical 3U CubeSats designed to perform detailed and frequent studies of tropical cyclones. This data will enable scientists to study the dynamic processes that occur in the inner core of the storm resulting in rapid genesis and intensification. William Blackwell of the Massachusetts Institute of Technology's Lincoln Laboratory in Lexington, Massachusetts is the principal investigator.

The constellation was initially planned to consist of six satellites delivered to orbit on three launches between June and July 2022. Due to the loss of the first two satellites in a launch failure on 12 June 2022, the constellation was reduced to four satellites, all launched in May 2023.

== Mission ==
TROPICS will perform very frequent measurements, similar to X-rays (but not actually observing X-rays), that cut through the overall cloud-cover to see the storm's underlying structure. The storm structures known as the eyewall – tall clouds, wind and rain around the eye – and rainbands – the rainy parts of the spiral arms – give clues about whether a storm is primed to intensify into a category 4 or 5 storm, something everyone in its path needs to know.

TROPICS will consist of six 3U size CubeSats, each about 10 × 10 × 36 cm (3.9 × 3.9 × 14.2 in) and weighing just 5.34 kg (11.8 lb), that use scanning microwave radiometers to measure temperature, humidity, precipitation and cloud properties. The CubeSats will be launched into three separate orbital planes to enable the overall constellation to monitor changes in tropical cyclones as frequently as every 21 minutes. Each CubeSat will host a high-performance radiometer scanning across the satellite track at 30 RPM to provide temperature profiles using seven channels near the 118.75 GHz oxygen absorption line, water vapor profiles using 3 channels near the 183 GHz water vapor absorption line, imagery in a single channel near 90 GHz for precipitation measurements, and a single channel at 206 GHz for cloud ice measurements. The investigation was selected from NASA's third Earth Venture Instrument competition.

Langley Research Center is the NASA Center leading the mission.

== Launches ==
The first launch took place on 12 June 2022. The Astra Rocket 3.3 vehicle (serial number LV0010) carrying two satellites for the TROPICS-1 mission failed to reach orbit and the satellites were lost. Following the retirement of Rocket 3.3 on 4 August 2022, it was reported that NASA intended to wait for Astra's Rocket 4 to be developed for the launch of the remaining four satellites of the constellation. However, it was reported at a conference on 8 August 2022 that NASA was "still looking for a ride".

On 28 September 2022, NASA announced that the remaining satellites would be launched by a different launch provider prior to the 2023 hurricane season. On 23 November 2022, NASA awarded the launch of the remaining CubeSats to Rocket Lab, with the launches to be performed by two Electron rockets starting in May 2023. The first of the two Rocket Lab launches successfully took place on 8 May 2023 at 01:00 UTC. The second and final launch took place on 26 May 2023 at 03:46 UTC.

== TROPICS Pathfinder CubeSat ==
The TROPICS Pathfinder CubeSat mission, consisting of a single satellite, was approved by NASA's Earth System Science Pathfinder (ESSP) Program Office in order to demonstrate the technologies planned for use on TROPICS in advance of the constellation's launch.

TROPICS Pathfinder CubeSat was launched on 30 June 2021 via SpaceX's Transporter-2 rideshare mission on a Falcon 9 launch vehicle.
