= Spaceport Camden =

Spaceport in Georgia, U.S.

- IATA: none; ICAO: none

Summary
- Location: Woodbine, Georgia
- Coordinates: 30°55′39″N 81°30′53″W
- Interactive map of Spaceport Camden

Spaceport Camden was a proposed commercial spaceport in Camden County, Georgia, near the city of Woodbine. The site tested the largest solid rocket motor ever fired as part of the Apollo Program and Camden County, Georgia was originally considered as a NASA launch site in the 1960s. Spaceport Camden began limited development as a rocket launch facility in early 2014, with its first launch taking place in August 2017, reaching 5,000 ft (1,524 m). While it had government support, it was met with local push back, and the project was ultimately scrapped in 2023.

== History ==
During the early 1960s, Camden County in Georgia was considered by NASA as a potential launch site for the Apollo program. A site on Merritt Island, Florida, near the existing Cape Canaveral launch pads, was selected instead; however some rocket testing for the Apollo program took place on the Georgia site.

In November 2012, the Camden County Joint Development Authority voted unanimously to "explore developing an aero-spaceport facility" at an Atlantic coastal site to support both horizontal and vertical launch operations, in hopes of attracting a SpaceX launch facility. SpaceX selected a location near Brownsville, Texas for its launch site. However, in June 2015, the county authorized environmental studies, purchasing a former industrial location used by Bayer CropScience and solid rocket motor manufacturer Thiokol to pursue the development of a spaceport. At the time, it was believed that the site, comprising 400 acres (160 ha), could see launches begin by 2020.

In March 2017, despite opposition from Cumberland Island residents concerned about disturbance to Cumberland Island National Seashore and the possibility of injuries and damage from launches, and belief that the Federal Aviation Administration was unlikely to authorize launches due to the fact that launch trajectories would pass over inhabited areas, the Georgia General Assembly approved legislation offering limited liability protection against spaceflight participant injury claims related to launches from the proposed spaceport, and in May Governor Nathan Deal signed HB 1. A 2017 study by Georgia Southern University determined that the spaceport could provide $22.5 million in yearly revenue to the region.

In March 2018, the FAA, the US regulatory agency for spaceports, approved the "draft status" of the Environmental Impact Statement (EIS) for the spaceport. On 20 December 2021, the Federal Aviation Administration issued a launch site operator license for Spaceport Camden with a flight trajectory limited to a 100-degree azimuth.

In March 2022, the project was rejected by Camden County voters in a referendum. Despite this, county representatives nonetheless attempted to move forward with the acquisition of the property while executing numerous legal maneuvers to invalidate the referendum, including an appeal to the Georgia Supreme Court on whether the voters had any right to override the county's decisions under the state constitution's Home Rule. In February 2023, the court unanimously agreed that the constitution allows the electorate to amend or repeal ordinances, resolutions, or regulations, and that the referendum was subsequently valid and enforceable.

As of 2023, the investors had called off the project, and the property was for sale.

== Facilities and operations ==
External image
- The Vector-R is launched at Spaceport Camden.

The planned facilities at Spaceport Camden include a vertical launch site and a control center, with provision for viewing facilities. Up to twelve launches and twelve landings a year would be permitted. The construction of an innovation and research park at the spaceport has been proposed to attract additional technology-based industry and create jobs.

In April 2017, Vector Space Systems announced that they would use the Spaceport Camden site to conduct a suborbital rocket test that summer. On 2 August 2017, the first launch from Spaceport Camden, of a Vector-R rocket, successfully took place.

In 2018, ABL Space Systems signed a lease with Camden County, Georgia for future operations in Spaceport Camden.

On 20 December 2021, the Federal Aviation Administration issued an operator license for Spaceport Camden.

== Launch history ==
| Launch | Date (UTC) | Vehicle | Payload | Launch pad | Result | Remarks |
|---|---|---|---|---|---|---|
| 1 | 2 August 2017, 16:15 | Vector-R | Two customer payloads; imaging and medicinal research | Harriett's Bluff Road | Success | Suborbital flight; launch took place from a trailer; the peak altitude was about 5,000 ft (1,524 m). |
