= Generation Orbit X-60 =

Air-launched single stage suborbital rocket vehicle

X-60
- Artist depiction of the X-60A in flight

General information
- Type: Experimental aircraft
- National origin: United States
- Manufacturer: Generation Orbit
- Primary user: Air Force Research Laboratory

The Generation Orbit X-60 (GOLauncher 1 or GO1) was an air-launched single stage suborbital rocket vehicle produced by Generation Orbit.

== Design and development ==
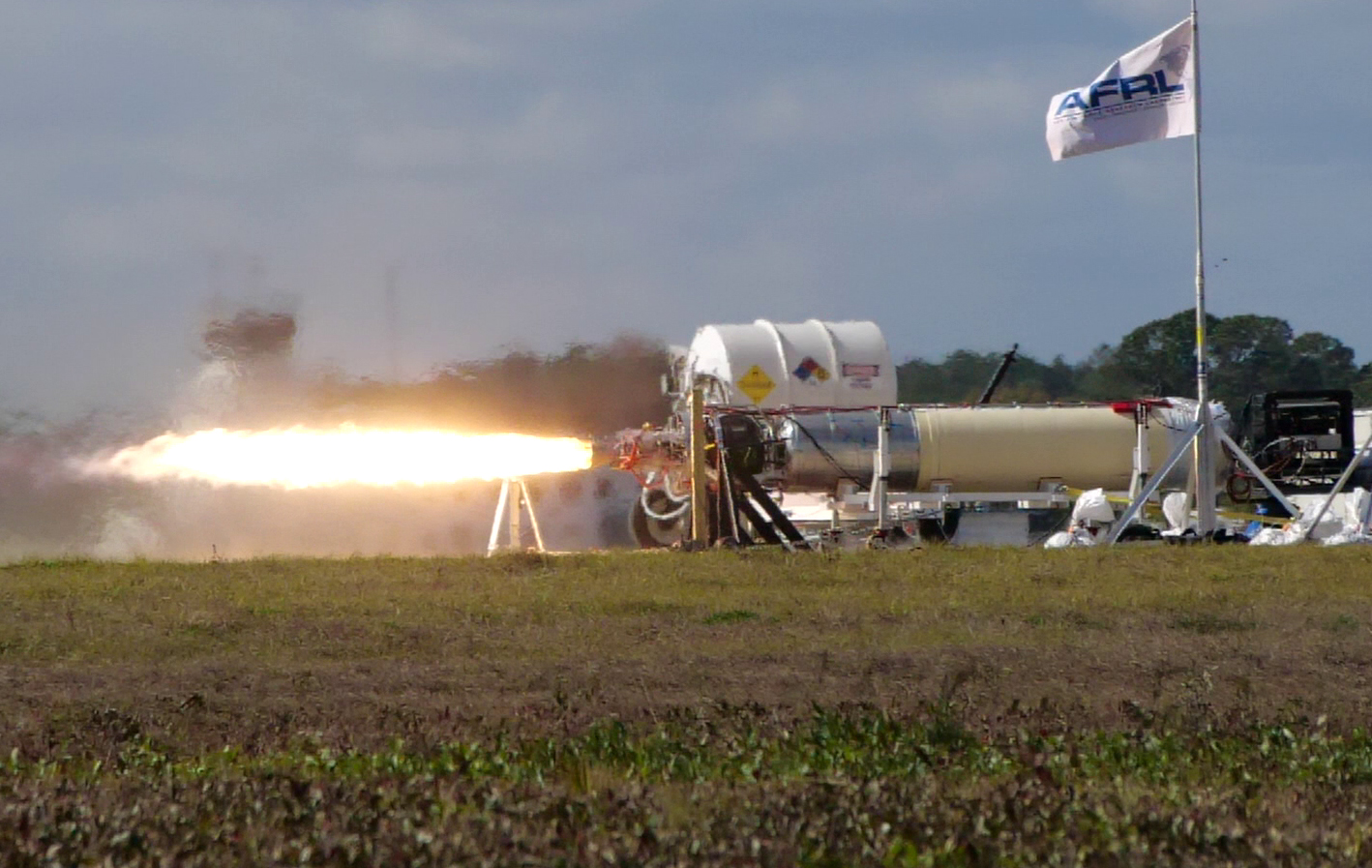
A hot-fire test of the X-60A air-launched rocket at Cecil Spaceport, January 14, 2020.

The first two segments of the GOLauncher 1 Inert Test Article (GO1-ITA) underwent a series of structural ground tests at Mercer University's Engineering Research Center (MERC) in December 2013.

In July 2014, GO was awarded a Phase I Small Business Innovative Research (SBIR) contract from the Air Force Research Laboratory, Aerospace Systems Directorate (AFRL/RQ) for development of GOLauncher 1. The nine-month effort, worth $150,000, focused on requirements definition, configuration trade studies, and trajectory design. In October 2018, the designation X-60A was assigned to the GO1 vehicle. Critical design review was completed in March 2019.

Applications of the X-60A include access to high altitudes for microgravity, astrophysics, hypersonics testing and research of avionics. On July 20, 2014, GO flew its first captive carry test platform using a Learjet 35. The vehicle then completed three additional captive carry tests in 2017.

The vehicle's integrated propulsion system validation ground testing was completed in January, 2020.

The program was cancelled in mid-2020 without much further information.
