= Chris Kemp =

CEO of Astra Space (born 1977)

Chris C. Kemp
- Chris Kemp in Astra Space factory, 2025
- Born: 1977 (age 48–49); Buffalo, New York
- Employer: Astra
- Title: Founder, Chairman and CEO

Chris C. Kemp (born 1977) is an American entrepreneur who, along with Dr. Adam London, founded Astra, a space technology firm based in California, in 2016. He served as the chief information officer (CIO) for the NASA Ames Research Center in Mountain View, California, and as NASA's first chief technology officer (CTO) for information technology. While at NASA, Kemp partnered with Google and Microsoft and helped in the creation of Google Moon and Google Mars. He worked with the White House to develop the cloud computing strategy for the United States Federal Government and co-founded OpenStack, an open-source software project for cloud computing. He was also one of the founders of Nebula, a company that from 2011 to 2015, worked to commercialise the technology.

== Early life ==
Kemp was born in Buffalo, New York, in 1977. He held his first job at 15 years old, working for Apple as a part of its Apple Dealer Network. Kemp studied computer engineering at the University of Alabama in Huntsville before leaving to found his first company, Netran.

== Business career ==
Kemp founded Netran, an online grocery shopping service for Kroger, while concurrently enrolled at the University of Alabama in Huntsville. Kemp held the titles of CEO and President at Netran from 1997 until 2000. Following Netran, Kemp joined Classmates.com as Chief Architect. In 2002, after a personal attempt to book a beach house rental online, Kemp co-founded Escapia, a property management platform. He served as the CEO from 2002 until 2006. Escapia was later sold to HomeAway in 2010.

=== NASA ===
Kemp joined NASA in 2006 as a director of strategic business development at the Ames Research Center in Silicon Valley where he helped forge a partnership with Google. In 2007, he was appointed chief information officer (CIO), making him responsible for most of its IT infrastructure (networks, data centers, systems, et al.) and several NASA-wide services, including the NASA Security Operations Center (SOC). As CIO, Kemp established a partnership with Microsoft.

Unlike traditional government procurements, where the government gave money to private companies, Kemp structured public-private partnerships with both Google and Microsoft that provided his team at NASA millions of dollars of funding to offset the costs of making several amounts of data available in Google Earth and Microsoft Worldwide Telescope. Kemp then assembled and led of a team of NASA contractors with the goal of enabling NASA to "leverage the web as a platform and take the lead in open, transparent and participatory space exploration and government". The project to carry forward this goal at NASA Ames was called the Nebula Cloud Computing Pilot.

Kemp's cloud project at NASA drew the attention of the Obama Administration. Vivek Kundra, the first United States federal chief information officer, asked Kemp to host the unveiling of the United States Cloud Computing Strategy and to work on one of the federal government's first major cloud initiatives, usaspending.gov, a website that tracks all financial spending from the US government. Kemp and the Nebula team launched the site, which is still hosted on NASA's cloud infrastructure.

In March 2010, Kemp was appointed as the first NASA chief technology officer (CTO) for information technology (IT) — or Information and Communication Technology (ICT). Kemp was responsible for the agency's Enterprise Architecture division and for introducing new and emerging technologies into IT planning and implementation. He was an outspoken advocate for the use of open-source software in the Federal Government.

Kemp was responsible for the first open-source release under the Apache 2.0 license framework, the Nova cloud computing controller. As CTO, Kemp also pioneered the use of NASA's unique public-private partnership authority to introduce new technologies into NASA.

Rackspace discovered NASA's open-source code and contacted Kemp to determine if NASA was interested in partnering together to form a project called OpenStack. Launched in July 2010, OpenStack is an open-source cloud computing platform based on code from Kemp's team at NASA, in collaboration with Rackspace.

In mid-2010, Kemp received the Federal Computer Week "Federal 100" and CIO Magazine's "CIO 100" awards for his work as Chief Information Officer (CIO) at NASA Ames Research Center in 2009.

On March 14, 2011, Kemp announced his resignation as NASA's Chief Technology Officer (CTO) for IT.

=== Nebula ===
On March 25, 2011, Kemp incorporated Fourth Paradigm Development, Inc. with entrepreneur Steve O'Hara and former colleague Devin Carlen. It would later change its name to Nebula.

Kemp held the CEO position for two years. In September 2013, Kemp became the Chief Strategy Officer and brought in veteran Gordon Stitt to lead Nebula as a public company. In April 2015, the company ceased operations.

=== Astra ===
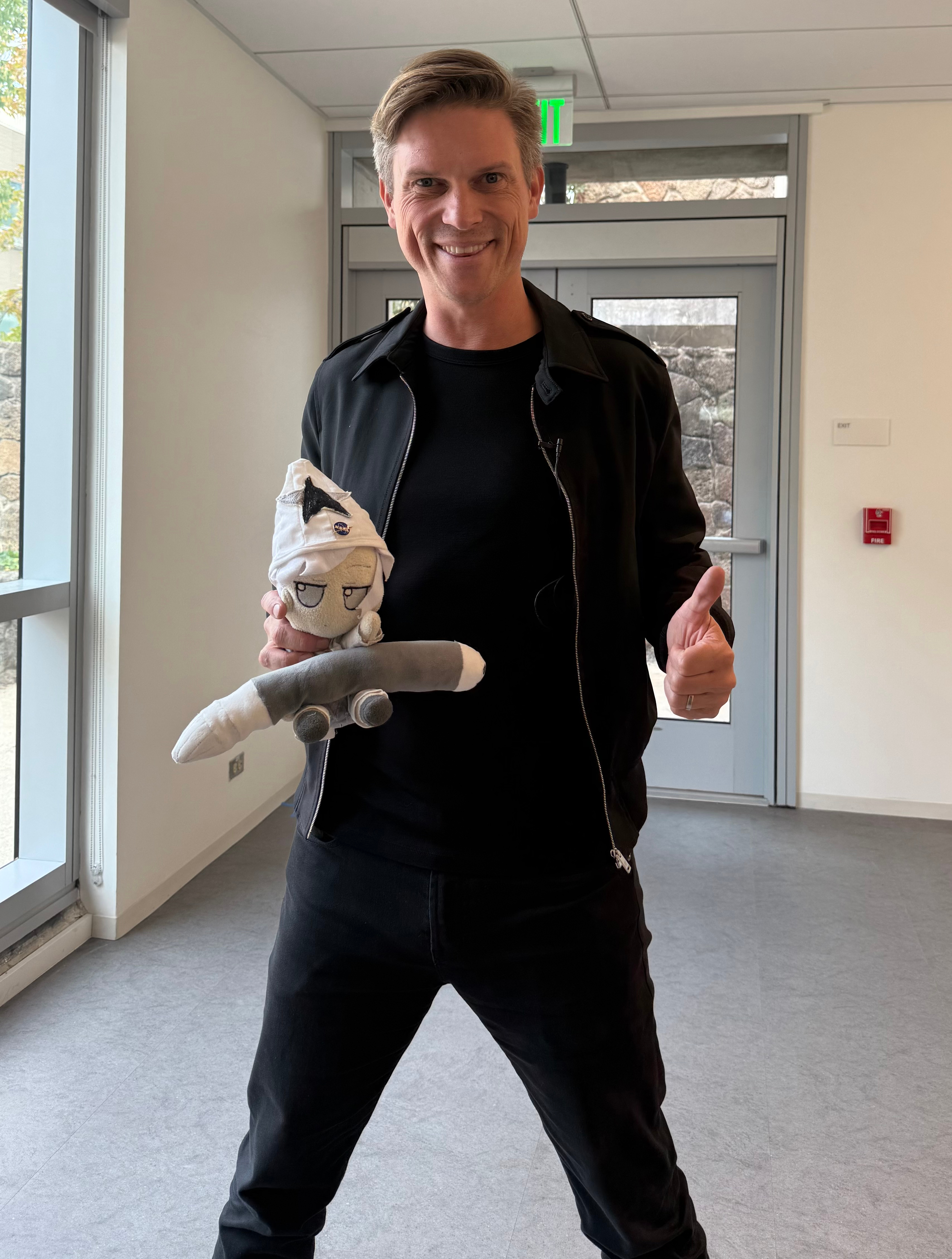
Chris Kemp in 2025

In October 2016, Kemp, together with Adam London, founded the startup Astra with the aim to develop a small-lift orbital rocket that will "carry critical technology to improve life on Earth from space". In July 2021, Kemp and London stated that their goal is to reach daily rocket launches. Astra demonstrated orbital launch capability with its launch from Kodiak, Alaska, in November 2021. Astra began building a 250,000 square feet (0.02 km^{2}) factory at its headquarters in Alameda, California and became the first space launch company to list in Nasdaq on July 1, 2021, at a valuation of $2.1 billion.
