= Ursa Major Technologies =

Aerospace manufacturer in Colorado, US

Ursa Major Technologies, Inc.
- Type: Private
- Industry: Aerospace
- Founded: 2015; 11 years ago
- Founder: Joe Laurienti
- Headquarters: Berthoud, Colorado, US
- Number of employees: 270 (2023)
- Website: ursamajor.com

Ursa Major Technologies is an American aerospace company founded in 2015 and based in Berthoud, Colorado. The company produces rocket engines for customers in the space launch and hypersonics industries, and the US Federal Government.

The company makes a 5,000-pound thrust liquid oxygen and kerosene Hadley engine, named after a character in Ray Bradbury's The Veldt. It also develops the Ripley engine, with 50,000 pounds (23,000 kg) of thrust, aimed at the medium-launch market.

Its commercial customers include C6 Launch Systems, a Canadian small satellite launcher, and American launch startup Phantom Space. It also works with Generation Orbit Launch Services and with Stratolaunch, supplying Hadley as the rocket engine for the latter.

== History ==
In 2017, Ursa Major raised US$8 million with participation from the Space Angels Network.

In December 2021 the company closed its largest funding round to date: an US$85 million Series C led by funds and accounts managed by BlackRock.

In April 2023 the company had about 270 employees. The company announced that it would supply the upper stage engine for Astra Space’s in-development Rocket 4.

As of 2024 its Draper prototype engine demonstrated stability similar to solid fuels, along with the active throttle control and throttle range of a liquid engine.In February 2026 it presented the HAVOC Missile System, a hypersonic weapon powered by Draper. According to Nick Doucette, co-founder and vice president at Ursa Major, in an interview with The War Zone, “China has had boost-glide hypersonics for a decade. Other hypersonic designs use a scramjet, which are costly and complex. Draper opened up hypersonic performance, where you have a wide range of trajectories and adaptability as well as other really creative mechanisms that, to be honest, the adversaries don’t have." It is said that the system can effectively bridges the gap between hypersonic flight and ballistic missiles by supplying users with the capability of switching capabilities at a moment's notice.

== Engines ==
| Engine | Status | Thrust at sea level, lbf | Thrust at sea level, kN | Propellant | Technology | Reusable | Maximum gimbal angle | Intended use |
|---|---|---|---|---|---|---|---|---|
| Hadley | Initial production | 5,000 | 22 | Liquid oxygen/kerosene | Oxygen-rich staged combustion | Yes | ±7° | Low Earth orbit, geostationary orbit, in-Space, hypersonics |
| Ripley | In development | 50,000 | 220 | Liquid oxygen/kerosene | Oxygen-rich staged combustion | Yes | ±5° | Low Earth orbit, geostationary orbit |
| Arroway | In development | 200,000 | 890 | Liquid oxygen/methane | Full flow staged combustion | Yes | ±5° | Medium and heavy boost |
| Draper | Demonstration flight (January 27, 2026) | 4,000 | 18 | Hydrogen peroxide/kerosene | Closed catalyst cycle | Yes | | Hypersonics, defense |

== See also ==
- Isar Aerospace
- Orbex
- PLD Space
- Radian Aerospace
- Relativity Space
- Rocket Factory Augsburg AG
- Skyrora
- Vector Launch
- List of private spaceflight companies
