= Phantom Space Corporation =

Rocket manufacturing company in Arizona

- Logo
- Industry: Space transportation, rocket manufacturing
- Founded: 31 October 2019
- Founder: Jim Cantrell, Michael D'Angelo, Michal Prywata
- Headquarters: Tucson, Arizona, United States
- Website: www.phantomspace.com

Phantom Space Corporation is an American space transportation and rocket manufacturing startup based in Tucson, Arizona.

== History ==
Phantom Space Corporation was founded in 2019 by Jim Cantrell, Michael D'Angelo, and Michal Prywata. Chris Thompson, the second employee at SpaceX and ten-year veteran, joined Phantom Space in October of 2021 as Chief Technology Officer in charge of launch and satellite system development.

In May 2021, Phantom acquired StratSpace, a satellite program designer and manager founded by Cantrell in 2000. The acquisition made Phantom Space the first 100% U.S.-based satellite supply chain in its effort to mass produce rockets on a large scale.

In August 2021, the company acquired space systems developer Micro Aerospace Solutions (MAS) operating out of Melbourne, Florida.

In 2023, Phantom signed an agreement with Equatorial Launch Australia (ELA) to collaborate on missions at the Arnhem Space Centre in Arnhem Land, a remote location in the Northern Territory of Australia. Phantom has links to the US Department of Defense, and an ELA spokesperson said that the launch site could one day be used for missile testing and development. Phantom hoped to fire rockets from the ASC site by 2025. While the main focus is on commercial uses at the site, the potential for involvement in defense has raised concerns among the local community.

== Daytona I ==
Daytona I
- Function: Small-lift space launch vehicle
- Manufacturer: Phantom Space Corporation
- Country of origin: US

Size
- Height: 18 m
- Diameter: 1.5 m
- Stages: 2

Capacity
- Payload to LEO: 180 kg

Associated rockets
- Comparable: Electron

Launch history
- Status: In development
- Launch sites: Cape Canaveral SLC-13 Vandenberg SLC-5
- Total launches: 0
- First flight: NET 2026

First stage
- Engines: 9x Hadley
- Thrust: 200 kN
- Propellant: Liquid oxygen/RP-1

Second stage
- Engines: 1x Hadley Vacuum
- Thrust: 28.8 kN
- Propellant: Liquid oxygen/RP-1

As of April 2025 the company is building a two-stage rocket called Daytona. As designed, the vehicle will be 18 meters tall, 1.5 meters in diameter. It will be able to lift 180 kilograms to low Earth orbit for a claimed launch price of $6 million. It will use nine Hadley engines produced by Ursa Major Technologies on its first stage, and one Hadley Vacuum engine on its second stage. The first launch was projected to take place in late 2026 – early 2027. It's now planned for H2 2027.

== Launch plans ==
Date and time, UTC	Launch site	Payload	Orbit	Customer	Launch outcome
H2 2027	Vandenberg SLC-5	TBA	LEO	TBA	
H2 2027	Maiden flight of Daytona				
Early 2027	TBD	Hurricane Hunter x 2	LEO	Tropical Weather Analytics	
Early 2027	Tropical Weather Analytics, Inc. (TWA), with a revolutionary 3D measurement capability for improved hurricane forecasting and weather intelligence, is announcing a strategic partnership with Phantom Space Corporation (Phantom) to design, manufacture, launch, and operate its Hurricane Hunter Satellite Constellation.				
2026	Vandenberg SLC-5	AFNIO × ?	LEO	Ingenu	
2026	Will launch "the majority of" Ingenu's 72-satellite AFNIO constellation.				
2026	Vandenberg SLC-5	TBA	LEO	TBA	
2026	CubeSat Launch Initiative contract awarded by NASA.				

== Daytona II ==
Daytona II is an upgraded version of the Daytona I rocket, It will use one Ripley engine on the first stage and one vacuum-optimized Hadley engine on the second stage, the rocket will be capable of delivering 440 kg to LEO and has been advertised at 4 million USD per launch. launches are planned to start in 2027.

== Daytona III ==
Daytona III is the third upgrade of the Daytona rocket, the first stage has a second Ripley engine and the second stage has one vacuum-optimized Hadley engine. The second stage will be capable of delivering 950 kg to LEO, the maiden launch is planned for 2028.
