= Jim Cantrell =

American aerospace engineer (born 1965)

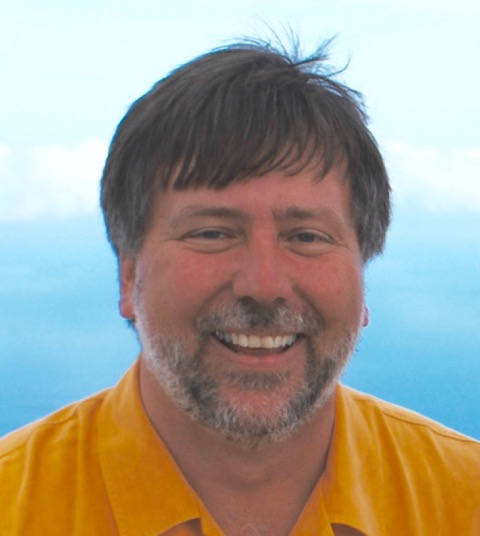
- Born: 5 October 1965 (age 61); Yucaipa, California, U.S.
- Education: Utah State University
- Occupations: Engineer and Entrepreneur
- Website: jimcantrell.com

Jim Cantrell (born October 5, 1965) is an American entrepreneur and mechanical engineer. He is the CEO and co-founder of Phantom Space Corporation, which aims to build space transportation technology. After working at the French Space Agency CNES (Centre Nationale d’Études Spatiales) and the NASA Jet Propulsion Lab, he worked as an independent consultant to aerospace companies for fifteen years and was on the founding teams of SpaceX and Moon Express. Cantrell was a consultant for SpaceX and Elon Musk's industry mentor when SpaceX launched in 2002.

A mechanical engineer by profession, Cantrell regularly participates in road racing.

== Early life and education ==
Cantrell was born and raised in Yucaipa, California, and went to high school in San Jose, California. In 1983 he enrolled at Utah State University for a BS in electrical engineering but later changed to mechanical engineering. Alongside his BS, he worked as a research engineer at the Jet Propulsion Laboratory (JPL) for one year starting in 1987. He worked on Mars exploration technologies at JPL, including Mars Rover and Mars Balloon missions. He completed his BS in 1988 and started work on his MS in mechanical engineering at Utah State University, while working as a research engineer at the University's Space Dynamics Laboratory, again focusing on Mars exploration. During this time, he began work on the Mars Snake, a 30-foot titanium exoskeleton designed to navigate Mars' treacherous terrain.

== Career ==
=== Early career ===
Cantrell joined the French Space Agency (CNES) in 1990 after completing his MS. He went to France to work on a joint French-Soviet Mars program and supported the development of the Mars Snake for the Mars 94/96 balloon mission. He returned to the U.S. in 1992 to join Space Dynamics Laboratory, where he led the spacecraft systems engineering on three small satellites for the Department of Defense. He also worked on various joint missile defense programs conducted between America and Russia. He was arrested while staying in Russia in 1996 due to some problems with satellite he was working on but released after a couple of weeks due to Al Gore's intervention. Cantrell was promoted to the position of director of program development in 1997.

In 2001, Cantrell started independent consulting and served as the program manager for the privately funded solar sail program known as Cosmos 1. The same year, Elon Musk approached him seeking his help in sending a mission to Mars using Russian rockets because of their low price compared to the US rockets. When Musk and Cantrell approached Russians, they refused to sell them rockets and Musk decided to build his own. Musk founded SpaceX with the assistance of Cantrell as a "founding member of the company" but Cantrell decided to not stay in the company after helping to build the technical team.

=== SpaceX ===
Cantrell was an early participant in the formation of SpaceX, serving as the company's first Vice President of Business Development. While frequently described in media reports as a co-founder of the company, Cantrell has stated that he prefers the designation of "Founding Member" as per his agreement with the company. His founding role in the early days of SpaceX has been subject to public dispute, but the official company records, marketing materials, and employment contract designating him as a "founding member of the company" validate his historical role and executive tenure.

=== Strategic Space Development ===
After ending his consulting work with SpaceX, Cantrell founded Strategic Space Development, an aerospace and technology consultancy and took on the position of president and CEO. One of the significant projects undertaken by Strategic Space was the Light Sail project headed by The Planetary Society where Cantrell served as project manager from 2008 through 2012. Strategic Space participated in over 46 spacecraft developments including NuStar, Juno, Skybox Imaging, and Iceye X-1. In 2010, the founders of Moon Express approached Cantrell seeking his help to develop a business offering commercial lunar robotic transportation. Cantrell became a member of the founding team of Moon Express and subsequently became the CTO of the company. Forbes selected Moon Express as one of the "Names You Should Know" in 2011. StratSpace's clients have included NASA, Lockheed Martin, Boeing, Northrop Grumman and Orbital Sciences.

During his tenure at Strategic Space, Cantrell also became involved in the technical and financial development of several startups including Skybox Imaging, Atlas Ground Systems, Iceye, PlanetIQ, York Space Systems, and Black Sky.

=== IDair ===
In 2013, Cantrell was hired as the CEO of IDair, a biometric authentication technology company, to turn the company around and settle existing legal disputes. As CEO, he reorganized the firm and led product development efforts at the company. He stepped down from the position in 2014 after obtaining a $17M settlement in IDair's favor.

=== Vector ===
In 2015, Cantrell approached John Garvey with a business idea to develop micro launch vehicles to service the microsatellite community. Vector purchased Garvey's company, Garvey Spacecraft, to jumpstart launch vehicle development and speed up time to market. Cantrell stepped down as CEO of Strategic Space Development (now known as StratSpace) to serve as the CEO of Vector. By late 2019, Vector had raised $100 million in venture funding and $2.5 million in contracts. The company originally planned to launch its first orbital vehicle by mid 2018 but development problems delayed the first launch. After the anchor investor pulled out, the company filed for Chapter 11 in December 2019.

=== Phantom Space ===
Cantrell founded Phantom Space in 2019 with Mike D’Angelo. The Arizona-based company plans to manufacture enough rockets to launch 100 missions a year. Cantrell has described Phantom Space as wanting to be the "Henry Ford" of the space industry, referring to the company's efforts to mass produce rockets and space vehicles. On the docket is Phantom's Daytona rocket, which is about 61 feet long and capable of launching nearly 1,000 pounds into low-Earth orbit at a cost of $4 million per mission.

Phantom is also working on a communications network called Phantom Cloud, which Cantrell calls "satellite internet for space." It is essentially a network that satellites can use to communicate with each other or with systems on the surface.

=== Board of advisors ===
Throughout his career, Cantrell served on corporate boards of several companies in the aerospace industry. In 2004, he became a board member at the Paragon Space Development Corporation and served there until 2013. He was on the Planetary Society's board of advisors from 2007 to 2012. He has also served on ATLAS Space Board of Advisors, Morf3D Board of Advisors, Iceye, and York Space Systems Board of Advisors. Cantrell also served on source selection panels for NASA reviewing proposals for deep space and space science missions for 15 years.

=== Road racing ===
Cantrell began racing on go-carts in his teen years, later transitioning to drag racing in 1982-1985. He began pursuing a career in racing in 2005. Since then he has participated in 25 Hours of Thunderhill, 24 Hours of Daytona Classic, SCCA GT-1 Championship events (placing 13th and 7th nationally in SCCA GT-1 championships) and vintage races all over the United States. He was the SCCA regional champion in Arizona in C Sports Racing in 2013 and 2014 and has been on the Arizona Region Sports Car Club of America's board since 2012 and currently serves as Regional Executive.

In 2005, he founded Vintage Exotics Competition Engineering, which designs and restores vintage racing cars. He was the Competition Driving Instructor at Raptor Motorsports from 2010 to 2012.

=== Books published by Cantrell ===
In April 2023, Cantrell published his first book "Breaking All The Rules: The Inside Story Of The New Space Race". This book traces the origins of a second space race that began at the end of the 1960's US-Soviet space race and eventually led to the creation of SpaceX and the explosive growth in commercial space. The story covers how this revolution began with a band of misfit engineers and scientists; Cantrell describes the events in first person narrative, detailing his early days with Elon Musk and SpaceX and how the new space economy was eventually ignited with the money and vision of billionaires such as Musk, Jeff Bezos, and Richard Branson.
