= Generation Orbit Launch Services =

American aerospace company

Generation Orbit Launch Services, Inc. (GO)
- Company type: Private
- Industry: Aerospace
- Founded: April 25, 2011
- Headquarters: Atlanta, Georgia
- Products: Hypersonic Flight Testing
- Number of employees: 30+
- Website: www.generationorbit.com

Generation Orbit Launch Services (GO) is an American aerospace company based in Atlanta, Georgia that is developing the technology for launch services for small payloads. The air-launch approach developed by GO and its partners offers flexible launch capabilities, poised to reduce fixed infrastructure needs, launch costs, and the time from contract signature to launch for government and industry customers alike.

== History ==
GO was founded on April 25, 2011 as a subsidiary company of SpaceWorks Enterprises, Inc. In 2013, GO competed in the NewSpace Business Plan Competition (BPC), winning first place and the $100,000 prize. The BPC was administered by the Space Frontier Foundation and held at Stanford University. Following the Business Plan Competition, GO was selected in September 2013 for NASA's Enabling eXploration and Technology (NEXT) contract, with an award of $2.1 million.

== GOLauncher family ==
Generation Orbit is developing the GOLauncher family, a series of high-speed flight and space launch systems designed to lower costs, improve responsiveness, and increase overall mission flexibility.

GO-FET is a captive carry test platform for avionics, spacecraft hardware, fluids experiments, CubeSats, nanosats, and pre-release flight maneuver testing. The GO-FET configuration uses a Learjet 35 aircraft platform that was first flown on July 30, 2014.

The X-60A GOLauncher 1 (GO1) is an air-launched single stage suborbital rocket vehicle.
