= 2027 in spaceflight =

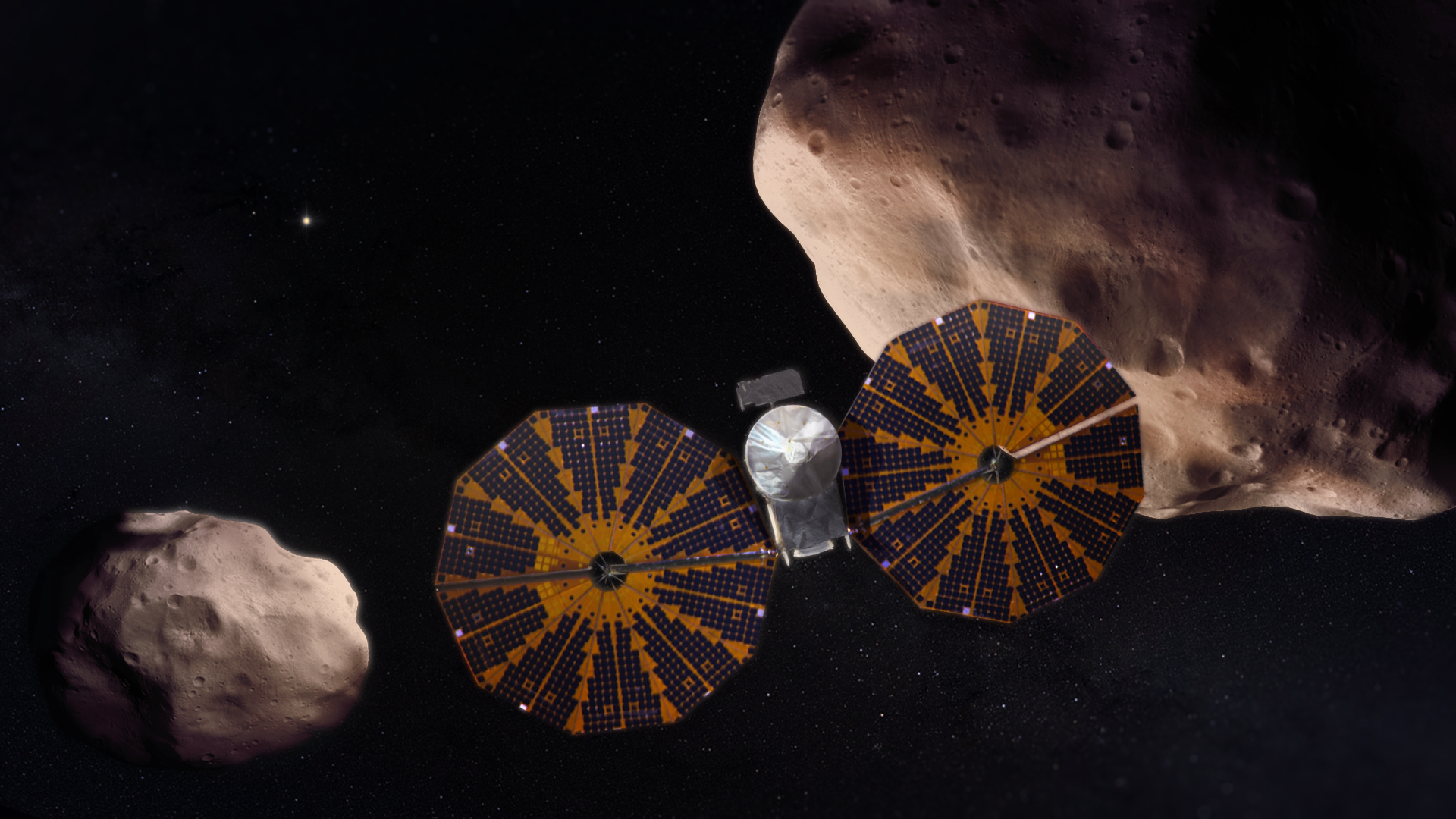
- Lucy will begin its exploration of Jupiter's Trojan asteroids in 2027

2027 in spaceflight

This article documents expected notable spaceflight events during the year 2027.

== Overview ==
=== Astronomy and astrophysics ===
In January, NASA plans to launch the small UV telescope Aspera designed to map hot gas in the circumgalactic and intergalactic medium of nearby galaxies.

In early 2027, ESA plans to launch the PLATO space telescope for discovery and characterization of exoplanets together with Europe's first stand-alone deep space CubeSat, the space weather mission HENON.

In early 2027, China plans to launch Xuntian, a large space telescope that will co-orbit with the Tiangong space station.

China plans to launch the eXTP X-ray observatory.

=== Lunar exploration ===
In January, NASA and Astrobotic plan to launch Griffin Mission One aiming to land near the Moon's south pole.

In early 2027, NASA and Blue Origin plan to launch Blue Moon Pathfinder Mission 1, the first uncrewed mission of the Blue Moon Mark 1 intended to test various technologies needed for future crewed Lunar landers.

In early 2027, NASA and Intuitive Machines plan to launch IM-3 aiming to land at Reiner Gamma.

In early 2027, China plans to launch Chang'e 7 to explore the lunar south pole. The mission will include an orbiter, a relay satellite, a lander, a rover, and a mini-flying probe. It will attempt to land on the rim of Shackleton crater at the Lunar south pole.

In 2027, Turkish Space Agency plans to launch AYAP-1, the country's first lunar mission.

In 2027, NASA and Firefly Aerospace plan to launch Blue Ghost Mission 2 aiming to land on the far side of the Moon. The mission also aims to deliver the ESA's communication satellite Lunar Pathfinder to Lunar orbit.

=== Human spaceflight ===
In January, NASA and Boeing plan to launch the uncrewed ISS cargo mission Starliner-1, the fourth orbital flight of the Starliner spacecraft.

In early 2027, China plans to launch Mengzhou 1, the first uncrewed orbital flight of the spacecraft and the complete Long March 10A rocket, both intended for the country's crewed lunar program.

In early 2027, NASA and Sierra Space plan to launch Dream Chaser Demo-1, the first free flyer orbital demonstration flight of the uncrewed cargo spaceplane Dream Chaser.

ISRO aims to launch Gaganyaan-1, India's first uncrewed orbital test flight to support human exploration missions.

In 2027, NASA is expected to launch the Artemis III mission, which will send astronauts to low Earth orbit and conduct docking tests with an HLS lander.

The American company Vast plans to launch the first ever commercial space station (Haven-1) in 2027.

The first Indian crewed spaceflight, Gaganyaan-4, is planned for 2027.

=== Satellite technology ===
In 2027, ESA plans to launch the short-lived Draco mission that will use a small space capsule to monitor the breakup process of a satellite reentering Earth atmosphere. This is part of the agency's space sustainability-related plans to build more "demisable" satellites.

== Orbital launches ==
- ← Jan
- Feb
- Mar
- Apr
- May
- Jun
- Jul
- Aug
- Sep
- Oct
- Nov
- Dec →

Date and time (UTC)	Rocket	Flight number	Launch site		LSP	
Date and time (UTC)	Payload (⚀ = CubeSat)	Operator	Orbit	Function	Decay (UTC)	Outcome
Date and time (UTC)	Remarks					
← Jan; Feb; Mar; Apr; May; Jun; Jul; Aug; Sep; Oct; Nov; Dec →; === January ===
6 January	(United States) Falcon Heavy		(United States) Kennedy LC-39A		(United States) SpaceX	
6 January	(United States) Griffin-I	Astrobotic	TLI to lunar surface	Lunar lander		
6 January	(United States) FLIP	Astrolab	TLI to lunar surface	Lunar rover		
6 January	⚀ (United States) CubeRover	Astrobotic	TLI to lunar surface	Lunar rover		
6 January	Part of the Commercial Lunar Payload Services program. Landing site is expected to be near the lunar south pole at Nobile Crater. Falcon Heavy core stage (B1091) could possibly feature the first Falcon Heavy center core recovery attempt since STP-2.					
10 January; 23:00	(Japan) H3-22S	F11	(Japan) Tanegashima LA-Y2		(Japan) MHI	
10 January; 23:00	(Japan) IGS-Optical Diversification 1	CSICE	Low Earth (SSO)	Reconnaissance		
10 January; 23:00	First of a new generation of IGS-Optical satellites. First H3 launch under the responsibility of MHI.					
14 January	(United States) Atlas V N22		(United States) Cape Canaveral SLC-41		(United States) ULA	
14 January	(United States) Boeing Starliner-1 (PCM-1)	Boeing / NASA	Low Earth (ISS)	TBA		
14 January	First operational Starliner mission, as part of the Commercial Crew Program.					
22 January	(Japan) KAIROS	F4	(Japan) Spaceport Kii		(Japan) Space One	
22 January	TBD	TBD	TBD	TBD		
29 January	(United States) Electron		(New Zealand) Mahia LC-1		(United States) Rocket Lab	
29 January	(United States) Aspera	NASA	Low Earth	Astronomy		
January (TBD)	(India) PSLV-XL	N1	(India) Satish Dhawan		(India) ISRO	
January (TBD)	(India) EOS-10 (Oceansat-3A)	ISRO	Low Earth (SSO)	Oceanography		
January (TBD)	(India) (Mauritius) IMJS	ISRO/Mauritius	Low Earth (SSO)	Earth observation		
January (TBD)	First PSLV rocket to be built by the private sector consortium of HAL and L&T					
January (TBD)	(United States) Astra Rocket 4		(United States) Wallops Flight Facility		(United States) Astra Space	
January (TBD)	(United States) Demo flight	Astra Space	Low Earth	Flight test		
January (TBD)	Maiden flight of the Astra Rocket 4					
January (TBD)	(United States) Falcon 9 Block 5		(United States) Cape Canaveral SLC-40		(United States) SpaceX	
January (TBD)	(United States) Ax-5	SpaceX / Axiom Space / ESA	Low Earth (ISS)	Private spaceflight		
January (TBD)	Axiom Mission 5, launching on Crew Dragon. 14-day commercial flight of four astronauts to the International Space Station.					
January (TBD)	(United States) New Glenn	BR-1	(United States) Cape Canaveral LC-36		(United States) Blue Origin	
January (TBD)	(United States) Blue Ring-1	Blue Origin	Geosynchronous Transfer Orbit	Technology demonstration		
January (TBD)	First Blue Ring mission					
← Jan; Feb; Mar; Apr; May; Jun; Jul; Aug; Sep; Oct; Nov; Dec →; === February ===
15 February	(United States) Firefly Alpha		(United States) Vandenberg SLC-2W		(United States) Firefly Aerospace	
15 February	(United States) QuickSounder	Southwest Research Institute and NOAA	Low Earth orbit (Sun-synchronous orbit	Meteorological satellite		
February (TBD)	(France) Ariane 62		(France) Kourou ELA-4		(France) Arianespace	
February (TBD)	Galileo L15	ESA	Medium Earth	Navigation		
February (TBD)	(United States) Falcon 9 Block 5		(United States) Vandenberg SLC-4E		(United States) SpaceX	
February (TBD)	(Taiwan) FORMOSAT-8B/GTM	TASA	Low Earth (SSO)	Earth observation/Gamma-ray astronomy		
February (TBD)	Dedicated SmallSat Rideshare mission to sun-synchronous orbit, designated Transporter-19.					
February (TBD)	(United States) Falcon 9 Block 5		(United States) Cape Canaveral SLC-40		(United States) SpaceX	
February (TBD)	(Italy) (France) SICRAL 3A	MDD/DGA	Geosynchronous	Communications		
← Jan; Feb; Mar; Apr; May; Jun; Jul; Aug; Sep; Oct; Nov; Dec →; === March ===
March (TBD)	(United States) Falcon 9		(United States) Cape Canaveral SLC-40		(United States) SpaceX	
March (TBD)	(United States) Crew-14	NASA	Low Earth orbit (ISS)	ISS Crew Transport		
March (TBD)	(Russia) Soyuz 2.1a		(Kazakhstan) Baikonur Cosmodrome Site 31/6		(Russia) Roscosmos	
March (TBD)	(Russia) MS-30	Roscosmos	Low Earth orbit (ISS)	ISS Crew Transport		
March (TBD)	(India) SSLV	L2	(India) Satish Dhawan		(India) ISRO	
March (TBD)	(India) SBS-3	ISRO	Low Earth	Reconnaissance satellite		
Q1 (TBD)	(France) Ariane 62		(France) Kourou ELA-4		(France) Arianespace	
Q1 (TBD)	Galileo L16	ESA	Medium Earth	Navigation		
Q1 (TBD)	(United States) Falcon 9 Block 5		(United States) Cape Canaveral SLC-40		(United States) SpaceX	
Q1 (TBD)	(United States) IM-3	Intuitive Machines	TLI to lunar surface	Lunar lander		
Q1 (TBD)	(United States) Khon1	Intuitive Machines	Earth–Moon L_{2}	Lunar communications		
Q1 (TBD)	(United States) Lunar Vertex rover	NASA	TLI to lunar surface	Lunar rover		
Q1 (TBD)	(United States) CADRE × 3	NASA	TLI to lunar surface	Lunar rovers		
Q1 (TBD)	Third Nova-C lunar lander. Commercial Lunar Payload Services (CLPS) mission delivering payloads to Reiner Gamma. ESA will provide the MoonLIGHT lunar laser retroreflector payload.					
Q1 (TBD)	(United States) Falcon 9 Block 5		(United States) Kennedy LC-39A		(United States) SpaceX	
Q1 (TBD)	(United States) Haven-1	Vast	Low Earth	Space habitat		
Q1 (TBD)	Single-module commercial space station.					
Q1 (TBD)	(United States) New Glenn	NG-5	(United States) Cape Canaveral LC-36		(United States) Blue Origin	
Q1 (TBD)	(United States) Blue Moon Pathfinder Mission 1	Blue Origin	TLI to lunar surface	Lunar lander Technology demonstration		
Q1 (TBD)	(MK1-SN001) Fourth National Security Space Launch demonstration mission for New Glenn. It will also be the first Commercial Lunar Payload Services (CLPS) mission for Blue Origin for NASA. It will carry two demonstration payloads for NASA on this flight.					
Q1 (TBD)	(United States) Falcon 9 Block 5		(United States) Cape Canaveral SLC-40		(United States) SpaceX	
Q1 (TBD)	(Mexico) TBA	APCO Networks	Geosynchronous Transfer Orbit	Communications		
Q1 (TBD)	(Thailand) TBA	Thaicom	Geosynchronous Transfer Orbit	Communications		
Q1 (TBD)	(Taiwan) TBA	Chunghwa Telecom	Geosynchronous Transfer Orbit	Communications		
Q1 (TBD)	(Oman) TBA	MB Group	Geosynchronous Transfer Orbit	Communications		
Q1 (TBD)	(Saudi Arabia) TBA	stc Group	Geosynchronous Transfer Orbit	Communications		
Q1 (TBD)	Astranis Block 3 mission.					
Q1 (TBD)	(United States) Electron		(New Zealand) Mahia LC-1		(United States) Rocket Lab	
Q1 (TBD)	(United States) TSIS-2	NASA / LASP	Low Earth (SSO)	Earth observation		
Q1 (TBD)	Total and Spectral Solar Irradiance Sensor-2. Hosted on a General Atomics Orbital Test Bed (OTB) satellite platform.					
Q1 (TBD)	(United States) Falcon 9 Block 5		(United States) Vandenburg SLC-4E		(United States) SpaceX	
Q1 (TBD)	(United States) WSF-M 2	Ball Aerospace and USSF	Low Earth orbit (Sun-synchronous orbit)	Weather satellite		
Q1 (TBD)	(United States) Blaze-2	United States Department of Defense	Low Earth orbit (Sun-synchronous orbit)	Technology demonstration		
Q1 (TBD)	USSF-178					
Q1 (TBD)	(Australia) Eris		(Australia) Bowen Orbital Spaceport		(Australia) Gilmour Space Technologies	
Q1 (TBD)	(Australia) Test Flight 2	Gilmour Space Technologies	Low Earth orbit	Flight test		
Q1 (TBD)	Second test flight for Eris					
Q1 (TBD)	(United States) Nova		(United States) Cape Canaveral LC-14		(United States) Stoke Space	
Q1 (TBD)	(United States) Autonomy-1	AstroForge	Low Earth orbit	Technology demonstration		
Q1 (TBD)	Maiden flight of Stoke Space Nova					
Q1 (TBD)	(United States) Electron		(New Zealand) Mahia LC-1A		(United States) Rocket Lab	
Q1 (TBD)	(United States) BlackSky Gen-3 Mission 8	BlackSky Technology	Low Earth (SSO)	Earth Observation		
Q1 (TBD)	(United States) New Glenn		(United States) Cape Canaveral LC-36A		(United States) Blue Origin	
Q1 (TBD)	(United States) BlueBird 17	AST SpaceMobile	Low Earth	Communications satellite		
Q1 (TBD)	(United States) BlueBird 18	AST SpaceMobile	Low Earth	Communications satellite		
Q1 (TBD)	(United States) BlueBird 19	AST SpaceMobile	Low Earth	Communications satellite		
Q1 (TBD)	(Germany) Spectrum		(Norway) Andøya		(Germany) Isar Aerospace	
Q1 (TBD)	(United States) Planet Pelican	Planet Labs	Low Earth	Earth observation satellite		
← Jan; Feb; Mar; Apr; May; Jun; Jul; Aug; Sep; Oct; Nov; Dec →; === April ===
April (TBD)	(France) Ariane 62		(France) Kourou ELA-4		(France) Arianespace	
April (TBD)	PLATO	ESA	Sun–Earth L_{2}	Exoplanetology		
April (TBD)	HENON	ESA	Heliocentric orbit	Space weather		
April (TBD)	(Italy) Vega-C		(France) Kourou ELV		(France) Arianespace	
April (TBD)	(South Korea) KOMPSAT-6	KARI	Low Earth (SSO)	Earth observation		
April (TBD)	(Italy) PLATiNO-1	Thales Alenia Space Italy	Low Earth (SSO)	Technology demonstration		
April (TBD)	The launch of this mission was originally planned with Roscosmos' Angara 1.2 rocket, but the South Korean Ministry of Science cancelled this contract due to sanctions against Russia and signed a launch contract with Arianespace.					
April (TBD)	(United States) Falcon 9 Block 5		(United States) Cape Canaveral SLC-40		(United States) SpaceX	
April (TBD)	(Turkey) AYAP-1	Turkish Space Agency	Selenocentric	Lunar Orbiter and Probe		
April (TBD)	Planning to impact the Moon at end of mission					
April (TBD)	(United States) Falcon 9 Block 5		(United States) Cape Canaveral SLC-40		(United States) SpaceX	
April (TBD)	TBA	TBA	TBA	TBA		
April (TBD)	Bandwagon-6					
April (TBD)	(United States) Falcon 9 Block 5		(United States) Cape Canaveral SLC-40		(United States) SpaceX	
April (TBD)	(United States) CRS SpX-36	NASA	Low Earth (ISS)	ISS logistics		
← Jan; Feb; Mar; Apr; May; Jun; Jul; Aug; Sep; Oct; Nov; Dec →; === June ===
June 2027	(United States) SLS Block 1		(United States) Kennedy LC-39B		(United States) NASA	
June 2027	(United States) Artemis III	NASA	Low Earth	Crewed spaceflight		
June 2027	Second crewed Orion flight, docking with one or two HLS lander from Blue Origin and SpaceX in low Earth orbit.					
June (TBD)	(United States) Falcon 9 Block 5		(United States) Cape Canaveral or Vandenberg		(United States) SpaceX	
June (TBD)	TBA	TBA	Low Earth (SSO)	TBA		
June (TBD)	Dedicated SmallSat Rideshare mission to sun-synchronous orbit, designated Transporter-20.					
June 2027	(United States) Starship		(United States) TBA		(United States) SpaceX	
June 2027	(United States) Starship HLS	SpaceX	Low Earth	Technology demonstration		
June 2027	A Starship Block 3 vehicle will serve as a docking target for the Orion spacecraft of Artemis III. It will launch after the Orion spacecraft.					
June 2027	(United States) New Glenn		(United States) Cape Canaveral LC-36		(United States) Blue Origin	
June 2027	(United States) Blue Moon Pathfinder Mission 2	Blue Origin	Low Earth	Technology demonstration		
June 2027	A Blue Moon Mk 1.5 vehicle will serve as a docking target for the Orion spacecraft of Artemis III. It could launch up to 90 days ahead of the Orion spacecraft.					
June (TBD)	(United States) Electron		(New Zealand) Mahia LC-1		(United States) Rocket Lab	
June (TBD)	(United States) PolSIR-1	NASA	Low Earth (SSO)	Earth observation		
June (TBD)	(United States) Electron		(New Zealand) Mahia LC-1		(United States) Rocket Lab	
June (TBD)	(United States) PolSIR-2	NASA	Low Earth (SSO)	Earth observation		
Q2 (TBD)	(United States) Vulcan VC4L		(United States) Cape Canaveral SLC-41		(United States) ULA	
Q2 (TBD)	(United States) CRS SNC-1	Sierra Nevada Corporation	Low Earth orbit (ISS)	Technology demonstration		
Q2 (TBD)	Maiden mission by the Dream Chaser aircraft					
Q2 (TBD)	(Germany) Spectrum		(Norway) Andøya		(Germany) Isar Aerospace	
Q2 (TBD)	(France) Tom & Jerry	Infinite Orbits	Low Earth	Technology demonstration		
Q2 (TBD)	(India) PSLV		(India) Satish Dhawan SLP		(India) NSIL	
Q2 (TBD)	(Japan) ISSA-J1	Astroscale	Low Earth	Technology demonstration		
Q2 (TBD)	(United States) Falcon Heavy		(United States) Kennedy LC-39A		(United States) SpaceX	
Q2 (TBD)	(United States) TBA	U.S. Space Force	TBA	TBA		
Q2 (TBD)	USSF-63 Mission.					
Q2 (TBD)	(United States) Falcon 9 Block 5		(United States) Cape Canaveral SLC-40		(United States) SpaceX	
Q2 (TBD)	(United States) Trinity	K2 Space	Geocentric orbit	Technology demonstration		
H1 (TBD)	(Spain) Miura 5		(France) Kourou ELD		(Spain) PLD Space	
H1 (TBD)	(Spain) Demo Flight	PLD Space	Low Earth	Flight test		
H1 (TBD)	First flight of Miura 5.					
H1 (TBD)	(Japan) H3-24L		(Japan) Tanegashima LA-Y2		(Japan) MHI	
H1 (TBD)	(Japan) ETS-9	JAXA and NICT	Geosynchronous Transfer Orbit	Communications satellite		
H1 (TBD)	ETS-9 will carry the High Speed Communication with Advanced Laser Instrument (HICALI), which will demonstrate 10Gbps laser communications between geosynchronous orbit and ground-stations.					
H1 (TBD)	(United States) Minotaur IV		(United States) TBA		(United States) Northrop Grumman	
H1 (TBD)	(United States) EWS OD-1	U.S. Space Force	Low Earth	Technology demonstration		
H1 (TBD)	USSF-261S-A mission.					
H1 (TBD)	(United States) Falcon 9 Block 5		(United States) Cape Canaveral SLC-40		(United States) SpaceX	
H1 (TBD)	(United States) VICTUS SURGO	United States Space Force	Low Earth	Technology demonstration		
H1 (TBD)	(Italy) Vega-C		(France) Kourou ELV		(France) Arianespace	
H1 (TBD)	(Italy) CSG-4	ASI	Low Earth (SSO)	Earth observation		
H1 (TBD)	Fourth COSMO-SkyMed 2nd Generation satellite.					
H1 (TBD)	(India) GSLV Mk II	F19	(India) Satish Dhawan SLP		(India) ISRO	
H1 (TBD)	(India) NVS-04	ISRO	Geosynchronous	Navigation		
H1 (TBD)	Fourth satellite of India's next generation NaVic consetellation.					
H1 (TBD)	(South Korea) HANBIT-NANO		(Brazil) Alcantara Launch Center		(France) Innospace	
H1 (TBD)	(South Korea) InnoSat-0	Innospace	Low Earth (SSO)	Technology demonstration		
H1 (TBD)	(Japan) H3		(Japan) Tanegashima LA-Y2		(Japan) MHI	
H1 (TBD)	(Japan) SDA Satellite	JSDF and JAXA	Geosynchronous Transfer Orbit	Space domain awareness		
H1 (TBD)	The Japan Self-Defense Forces (JSDF) is collaborating with JAXA to develop a dedicated space domain awareness satellite to monitor threats.					
← Jan; Feb; Mar; Apr; May; Jun; Jul; Aug; Sep; Oct; Nov; Dec →; === July ===
July (TBD)	(United States) Falcon 9 Block 5		(United States) Kennedy LC-39A		(United States) SpaceX	
July (TBD)	(United States) Haven-1 Crew-1	Vast	Low Earth	Human spaceflight		
July (TBD)	First crewed mission to the Haven-1 space station					
← Jan; Feb; Mar; Apr; May; Jun; Jul; Aug; Sep; Oct; Nov; Dec →; === August ===
August (TBD)	(United States) Falcon 9 Block 5		(United States) Cape Canaveral SLC-40		(United States) SpaceX	
August (TBD)	(United States) COSI	NASA	Low Earth	Gamma-ray astronomy		
August (TBD)	Compton Spectrometer and Imager (COSI). Part of NASA's Small Explorers program.					
← Jan; Feb; Mar; Apr; May; Jun; Jul; Aug; Sep; Oct; Nov; Dec →; === September ===
September (TBD)	(United States) New Glenn		(United States) Cape Canaveral LC-36		(United States) Blue Origin	
September (TBD)	(United States) Blue Moon Pathfinder Mission 2	Blue Origin	TLI to lunar surface	Lunar lander Technology demonstration		
September (TBD)	(United States) VIPER	NASA	TLI to lunar surface	Lunar Rover		
September (TBD)	Blue Moon Pathfinder Mission 2 (MK1-SN002), expected to launch in 2027.					
September (TBD)	(United States) Falcon 9 Block 5		(United States)		(United States) SpaceX	
September (TBD)	(Canada) Lightspeed × 18	Telesat	Low Earth (SSO)	Communications		
September (TBD)	First of 14 Falcon 9 launches for Telesat's Lightspeed LEO constellation.					
Q3 (TBD)	(United States) Falcon 9 Block 5		(United States) Cape Canaveral SLC-40		(United States) SpaceX	
Q3 (TBD)	(United States) Vast-PAM-1	Vast	Low Earth	Human spaceflight		
Q3 (TBD)	First crew rotation to the Haven-1 space station					
← Jan; Feb; Mar; Apr; May; Jun; Jul; Aug; Sep; Oct; Nov; Dec →; === October ===
October (TBD)	(United States) Falcon 9 Block 5		(United States) Cape Canaveral SLC-40		(United States) SpaceX	
October (TBD)	(Saudi Arabia) Arabsat-7A	Arabsat	Geosynchronous	Communications		
October (TBD)	(United States) Falcon 9 Block 5		(United States) Cape Canaveral or Vandenberg		(United States) SpaceX	
October (TBD)	TBA	TBA	Low Earth (SSO)	TBA		
October (TBD)	Dedicated SmallSat Rideshare mission to sun-synchronous orbit, designated Transporter-21.					
← Jan; Feb; Mar; Apr; May; Jun; Jul; Aug; Sep; Oct; Nov; Dec →; === November ===
November (TBD)	(Italy) Vega-C		(France) Kourou ELV		(France) Arianespace	
November (TBD)	Sentinel CO2M-A	ESA	Low Earth (SSO)	Earth observation		
November (TBD)	First satellite of the Copernicus Anthropogenic Carbon Dioxide Monitoring mission. Part of the European Space Agency's Copernicus Programme.					
November (TBD)	(United States) Falcon 9 Block 5		(United States) Cape Canaveral SLC-40		(United States) SpaceX	
November (TBD)	(Italy) (France) SICRAL 3B	MDD and DGA	Geosynchronous	Communications		
November (TBD)	(Italy) Vega-C		(France) Kourou ELV		(France) Arianespace	
November (TBD)	(Italy) PLATiNO-2	ASI	Low Earth (SSO)	Technology demonstration		
← Jan; Feb; Mar; Apr; May; Jun; Jul; Aug; Sep; Oct; Nov; Dec →; === December ===
Q4 (TBD)	(Russia) Angara A5M		(Kazakhstan) Vostochny Site 1A		(Russia) Roscosmos	
Q4 (TBD)	(Russia) NEM-1	Roscosmos	Low Earth (ISS)	Space habitat		
Q4 (TBD)	The Science and Power Module (NEM-1) will become the most advanced module of the ISS once docked to it. The module could also serve as a cornerstone of a future Russian space station and a deep-space outpost. Maiden flight of the Angara A5M variant					
Q4 (TBD)	(Italy) Vega-C		(France) Kourou ELV		(France) Arianespace	
Q4 (TBD)	CRISTAL-A (Sentinel-9A)	ESA	Low Earth (SSO)	Earth observation		
Q4 (TBD)	(United States) Falcon 9 Block 5		(United States) Cape Canaveral SLC-40		(United States) SpaceX	
Q4 (TBD)	(Norway) Thor 8	Space Norway	Geosynchronous	Communications		
Q4 (TBD)	(United States) Falcon 9 Block 5		(United States) Cape Canaveral or Vandenburg		(United States) SpaceX	
Q4 (TBD)	(Norway) Exo-1	Exolaunch	Low Earth orbit	Rideshare		
Q4 (TBD)	First rideshare mission by Exolaunch					
H2 (TBD)	(United States) Falcon 9 Block 5		(United States) Cape Canaveral SLC-40		(United States) SpaceX	
H2 (TBD)	(United Arab Emirates) Al Yah 4	Yahsat	Geosynchronous	Communications		
H2 (TBD)	Replacement for Yahsat 1A (Al Yah 1).					
H2 (TBD)	(United States) Falcon 9 Block 5		(United States) Cape Canaveral SLC-40		(United States) SpaceX	
H2 (TBD)	(South Korea) GEO-KOMPSAT-3	KASA	Geosynchronous	Communications		
H2 (TBD)	(United States) Falcon 9 Block 5		(United States) Cape Canaveral SLC-40		(United States) SpaceX	
H2 (TBD)	(United States) IM-4	Intuitive Machines	TLI to lunar surface	Lunar lander		
H2 (TBD)	(United States) Lunar Data Network satellite x2	Intuitive Machines	TLI to Lunar orbit	Lunar communications		
H2 (TBD)	Fourth Nova-C lunar lander carrying six NASA payloads, alongside 2 Lunar Data Network constellation satellites					
H2 (TBD)	(France) Maia		(France) Kourou ELS		(France) MaiaSpace	
H2 (TBD)	TBA	TBA	Low Earth	TBA		
H2 (TBD)	Maiden flight of Maia.					
H2 (TBD)	(India) GSLV Mk II	F20	(India) Satish Dhawan SLP		(India) ISRO	
H2 (TBD)	(India) NVS-05	ISRO	Geosynchronous	Navigation		
H2 (TBD)	Fifth satellite of India's next generation NaVic constellation.					
H2 (TBD)	(France) Ariane 64		(France) Kourou ELA-4		(France) Arianespace	
H2 (TBD)	(United States) NEXUS-1	Katalyst Space Technologies	Geosynchronous	Technology demonstration		
← Jan; Feb; Mar; Apr; May; Jun; Jul; Aug; Sep; Oct; Nov; Dec →; === To be determined ===
2027 (TBD)	(Russia) Soyuz-2.1b / Fregat		(Kazakhstan) Baikonur		(Russia) Roscosmos	
2027 (TBD)	(Russia) Arktika-M №5	Roscosmos	Molniya	Meteorology		
2027 (TBD)	(India) HLVM3	H1	(India) Satish Dhawan SLP		(India) ISRO	
2027 (TBD)	(India) Gaganyaan-4	ISRO	Low Earth	Crewed spaceflight		
2027 (TBD)	India's first crewed spaceflight.					
2027 (TBD)	(Italy) Vega-C		(France) Kourou ELV		(France) Arianespace	
2027 (TBD)	(United States) SpaceBelt	Cloud Constellation Corporation	Low Earth orbit	Space-based data center		
2027 (TBD)	(India) HLVM3		(India) Satish Dhawan SLP		(India) ISRO	
2027 (TBD)	(India) Gaganyaan-2	ISRO	Low Earth	Flight test		
2027 (TBD)	Second Gaganyaan flight test. Will carry the Vyommitra humanoid robot.					
2027 (TBD)	(India) PSLV-XL		(India) Satish Dhawan		(India) ISRO	
2027 (TBD)	(India) Cartosat-3B	ISRO	Low Earth (SSO)	Earth observation		
early 2027 (TBD)	(China) Long March 5B		(China) Wenchang LC-1		(China) CASC	
early 2027 (TBD)	(China) Xuntian	CNSA	Low Earth (TSS)	Space astronomy		
early 2027 (TBD)	Xuntian ("Heavenly Cruiser"), also known as the Chinese Survey Space Telescope or Chinese Space Station Telescope (CSST), will co-orbit with the Tiangong space station					
2027 (TBD)	(France) Ariane 62		(France) Kourou ELA-4		(France) Arianespace	
2027 (TBD)	Galileo L17	ESA	Medium Earth	Navigation		
2027 (TBD)	First Galileo Second Generation launch.					
2027 (TBD)	(France) Ariane 62		(France) Kourou ELA-4		(France) Arianespace	
2027 (TBD)	Galileo L18	ESA	Medium Earth	Navigation		
2027 (TBD)	Second Galileo Second Generation launch.					
2027 (TBD)	(Japan) Epsilon S		(Japan) Uchinoura		(Japan) JAXA	
2027 (TBD)	(Vietnam) LOTUSat-1	VNSC	Low Earth (SSO)	Earth observation		
2027 (TBD)	First launch of Epsilon S, an upgraded version of Epsilon that will have commonality with H3 rocket components.					
2027 (TBD)	(China) Long March 5		(China) Wenchang LC-101		(China) CASC	
2027 (TBD)	(China) Chang'e 7 orbiter	CNSA	Selenocentric	Lunar orbiter		
2027 (TBD)	(China) Chang'e 7 lander	CNSA	Selenocentric to Lunar south pole	Lunar lander		
2027 (TBD)	(China) Chang'e 7 rover	CNSA	Selenocentric to Lunar south pole	Lunar rover		
2027 (TBD)	(China) Chang'e 7 hopper	CNSA	Selenocentric to Lunar south pole	Lunar hopper		
2027 (TBD)	The mission will land on the rim of Shackleton crater at the lunar south pole to study lunar surface environment around the regions, especially in looking for water ice in lunar soil. A new 6 Meter Diameter Fairing will be used in this mission.					
2027 (TBD)	(Russia) Soyuz-2.1b / Fregat-M		(Kazakhstan) Baikonur		(Russia) Roscosmos	
2027 (TBD)	(Russia) Arktika-M №3	Roscosmos	Molniya	Meteorology		
2027 (TBD)	(Russia) Soyuz-2.1b / Fregat-M		(Kazakhstan) Baikonur		(Russia) Roscosmos	
2027 (TBD)	(Russia) Arktika-M №4	Roscosmos	Molniya	Meteorology		
2027 (TBD)	(Germany) RFA One		(United Kingdom) SaxaVord		(Germany) RFA	
2027 (TBD)	⚀ (Germany) AllBertEinStein	Technical University of Munich	Low Earth (SSO)	Technology demonstration		
2027 (TBD)	⚀ (Italy) ARTICA	SpaceMind	Low Earth (SSO)	Technology demonstration		
2027 (TBD)	(Italy) Separation Ring Mission	SpaceMind	Low Earth (SSO)	Technology demonstration		
2027 (TBD)	⚀ (Germany) Curium Two	Planetary Transportation Systems	Low Earth (SSO)	Technology demonstration		
2027 (TBD)	(Germany) (Spain) (Greece) Erminaz	AMSAT, Libre Space Foundation	Low Earth (SSO)	Amateur radio		
2027 (TBD)	⚀ (Germany) PCIOD	Deployables Cubed GmbH (DCUBED)	Low Earth (SSO)	Technology demonstration		
2027 (TBD)	⚀ (Germany) SpaceDREAM	Kinetik Space	Low Earth (SSO)	Technology demonstration		
2027 (TBD)	Maiden flight of Rocket Factory Augsburg's RFA One. First orbital rocket launch from the United Kingdom.					
2027 (TBD)	(United States) Vulcan Centaur VC4S		(United States) Cape Canaveral SLC-41		(United States) ULA	
2027 (TBD)	(United States) TBA	U.S. Space Force	TBA	Reconnaissance		
2027 (TBD)	USSF-112 Mission.					
2027 (TBD)	(United States) Falcon 9 Block 5		(United States) Cape Canaveral		(United States) SpaceX	
2027 (TBD)	(United Kingdom) Skynet 6A	Airbus Defence and Space and UK Ministry of Defence	Geosynchronous	Military communications		
2027 (TBD)	(United States) New Glenn	LN-01	(United States) Cape Canaveral LC-36		(United States) Blue Origin	
2027 (TBD)	(United States) KuiperSat × 48	Amazon Leo	Low Earth	Communications		
2027 (TBD)	First of 24 New Glenn launches for Amazon's Amazon Leo.					
2027 (TBD)	(United States) Vulcan Centaur		(United States) Cape Canaveral SLC-41		(United States) ULA	
2027 (TBD)	(United States) TBA	U.S. Space Force	TBA	TBA		
2027 (TBD)	USSF-23 Mission.					
2027 (TBD)	(United States) Vulcan Centaur		(United States) Cape Canaveral SLC-41		(United States) ULA	
2027 (TBD)	(United States) LDPE-4 (ROOSTER-4)	United States Space Force	Geosynchronous	Technology demonstration		
2027 (TBD)	(United States) Tetra 5	USSF	Geosynchronous	Technology demonstration		
2027 (TBD)	USSF-43 Mission.					
2027 (TBD)	(United States) Vulcan Centaur		(United States) Cape Canaveral SLC-41		(United States) ULA	
2027 (TBD)	(United States) TBA	U.S. Space Force	TBA	TBA		
2027 (TBD)	USSF-16 Mission.					
2027 (TBD)	(United States) Vulcan Centaur		(United States) Cape Canaveral SLC-41		(United States) ULA	
2027 (TBD)	(United States) WGS-11+ (PTS-P1)	USSF and Northrop Grumman	Geosynchronous	Technology demonstration		
2027 (TBD)	First WGS launch on Vulcan. On-orbit demonstration mission for the U.S. Space Force's Protected Tactical Satcom (PTS) program.					
2027 (TBD)	(United States) Antares 330		(United States) Wallops LP-0A		(United States) Northrop Grumman	
2027 (TBD)	(United States) Cygnus NG-22	NASA	Low Earth (ISS)	ISS logistics		
2027 (TBD)	First flight of the Antares 330 variant.					
2027 (TBD)	(Japan) H3-24W		(Japan) Tanegashima LA-Y2		(Japan) JAXA	
2027 (TBD)	(Japan) HTV-X2	JAXA	Low Earth (ISS)	ISS logistics		
2027 (TBD)	(Japan) H3-24W		(Japan) Tanegashima LA-Y2		(Japan) JAXA	
2027 (TBD)	(Japan) HTV-X3	JAXA	Low Earth (ISS)	ISS logistics		
2027 (TBD)	(Italy) Vega-C		(France) Kourou ELV		(Italy) Avio	
2027 (TBD)	(Italy) IRIDE Mission 2	ASI	Low Earth	Earth observation		
2027 (TBD)	Second launch for the Italian IRIDE satellite constellation.					
2027 (TBD)	(United States) Terran R		(United States) Cape Canaveral LC-16		(United States) Relativity Space	
2027 (TBD)	(United States) Demo Flight	Relativity Space	Low Earth	Flight test		
2027 (TBD)	(United States) Astra Rocket 4		(United States) Kennedy LC-48		(United States) Astra Space	
2027 (TBD)	(United States) STP-S29B	United States Department of Defense	Low Earth	TBA		
2027 (TBD)	(United States) Falcon 9 Block 5		(United States) Cape Canaveral SLC-40		(United States) SpaceX	
2027 (TBD)	(United States) Blue Ghost Mission 2	NASA and Firefly	TLI to lunar surface	Lunar lander		
2027 (TBD)	(United States) Elytra Dark	Firefly	Low Earth to TLI	Space tug		
2027 (TBD)	(United Arab Emirates) Rashid 2	MBRSC	TLI to lunar surface	Lunar rover		
2027 (TBD)	(United Kingdom) Lunar Pathfinder	SSTL and ESA	Selenocentric (ELFO)	Communications		
2027 (TBD)	Second Blue Ghost mission. Commercial Lunar Payload Services (CLPS) mission delivering two payloads to the far side of the Moon.					
2027 (TBD)	(United States) Falcon Heavy		(United States) Kennedy LC-39A		(United States) SpaceX	
2027 (TBD)	(United States) Griffin-II	Astrobotic	TLI to lunar surface	Lunar lander		
2027 (TBD)	Third Astrobotic lunar lander mission, targeting a site near the lunar south pole. Astrobotic's LunaGrid-Lite aims to demonstrate high voltage power transmission from the lander to a tethered CubeRover.					
2027 (TBD)	(United States) Starship HLS		(United States) TBA		(United States) SpaceX	
2027 (TBD)	(United States) FLEX	Astrolab	TLI to lunar surface	Lunar lander		
2027 (TBD)	Uncrewed Starship HLS rideshare mission to the lunar south pole. Astrolab's Flexible Logistics and Exploration (FLEX) rover to be part of the mission.					
2027 (TBD)	(United States) Vulcan Centaur		(United States) Vandenberg SLC-3E		(United States) ULA	
2027 (TBD)	(United States) Tracking Layer Tranche 1 × 7	SDA	Low Earth	Missile tracking		
2027 (TBD)	(United States) Vulcan Centaur		(United States) Vandenberg SLC-3E		(United States) ULA	
2027 (TBD)	(United States) TBA	U.S. Space Force	TBA	Reconnaissance		
2027 (TBD)	USSF-114 Mission.					
2027 (TBD)	(United States) Vulcan Centaur		(United States) Cape Canaveral SLC-41		(United States) ULA	
2027 (TBD)	(United States) TBA	NRO	TBA	TBA		
2027 (TBD)	NROL-64 Mission. First NRO launch on Vulcan.					
2027 (TBD)	(United States) Vulcan Centaur		(United States) Vandenberg SLC-3E		(United States) ULA	
2027 (TBD)	(United States) TBA	NRO	TBA	TBA		
2027 (TBD)	NROL-83 Mission. First Vulcan Centaur launch from Vandenberg.					
2027 (TBD)	(United States) Eclipse		(United States) Wallops LP-0A		(United States) Firefly Aerospace	
2027 (TBD)	(United States)	Firefly Aerospace	Low Earth	Flight test		
2027 (TBD)	First test flight of Firefly's Eclipse, utilizing the same first stage used on Antares 330, a new Firefly-developed second stage with a single Vira engine, and a new payload fairing by Northrop Grumman.					
2027 (TBD)	(United States) Firefly Alpha		(United States) Vandenberg SLC-2W		(United States) Firefly Aerospace	
2027 (TBD)	(United States) L3Harris Launch 1	L3Harris	Low Earth	TBA		
2027 (TBD)	First of three dedicated launches for L3Harris.					
2027 (TBD)	(United States) Firefly Alpha		(United States) Vandenberg SLC-2W		(United States) Firefly Aerospace	
2027 (TBD)	(United States) L3Harris Launch 2	L3Harris	Low Earth	TBA		
2027 (TBD)	Second of three dedicated launches for L3Harris.					
2027 (TBD)	(United States) Firefly Alpha		(United States) Vandenberg SLC-2W		(United States) Firefly Aerospace	
2027 (TBD)	(United States) L3Harris Launch 3	L3Harris	Low Earth	TBA		
2027 (TBD)	Third of three dedicated launches for L3Harris.					
2027 (TBD)	(United States) Falcon 9 Block 5		(United States)		(United States) SpaceX	
2027 (TBD)	(Canada) Lightspeed × 18	Telesat	Low Earth (SSO)	Communications		
2027 (TBD)	Second of 14 Falcon 9 launches for Telesat's Lightspeed LEO constellation.					
2027 (TBD)	(United States) Falcon 9 Block 5		(United States)		(United States) SpaceX	
2027 (TBD)	(Canada) Lightspeed × 18	Telesat	Low Earth (SSO)	Communications		
2027 (TBD)	Third of 14 Falcon 9 launches for Telesat's Lightspeed LEO constellation.					
2027 (TBD)	(United States) Falcon 9 Block 5		(United States)		(United States) SpaceX	
2027 (TBD)	(Canada) Lightspeed × 18	Telesat	Low Earth (SSO)	Communications		
2027 (TBD)	Fourth of 14 Falcon 9 launches for Telesat's Lightspeed LEO constellation.					
2027 (TBD)	(United States) Falcon 9 Block 5		(United States)		(United States) SpaceX	
2027 (TBD)	(Canada) Lightspeed × 18	Telesat	Low Earth (SSO)	Communications		
2027 (TBD)	Fifth of 14 Falcon 9 launches for Telesat's Lightspeed LEO constellation.					
2027 (TBD)	(United States) Vulcan Centaur		(United States) Vandenberg SLC-3E		(United States) ULA	
2027 (TBD)	(United States) Tracking Layer Tranche 1 × 7	SDA	Low Earth (Polar orbit)	Missile tracking		
2027 (TBD)	(United States) Falcon 9 Block 5		(United States) Vandenberg SLC-4E		(United States) SpaceX	
2027 (TBD)	(United States) Transport Layer Tranche 2 × 21	SDA	Low Earth (Polar orbit)	Military communications		
2027 (TBD)	(United States) Vulcan Centaur		(United States) Vandenberg SLC-3E		(United States) ULA	
2027 (TBD)	(United States) Transport Layer Tranche 2 × 21	SDA	Low Earth (Polar orbit)	Missile tracking		
2027 (TBD)	(United States) Falcon 9 Block 5		(United States) Cape Canaveral SLC-40		(United States) SpaceX	
2027 (TBD)	(United States) Transport Layer Tranche 2 × 21	SDA	Low Earth (Polar orbit)	Military communications		
2027 (TBD)	(United States) Falcon Heavy		(United States) Kennedy LC-39A		(United States) SpaceX	
2027 (TBD)	(United States) TBA	U.S. Space Force	TBA	TBA		
2027 (TBD)	USSF-75 Mission.					
2027 (TBD)	(United States) Vulcan Centaur VC6S		(United States) Cape Canaveral SLC-41		(United States) ULA	
2027 (TBD)	(United States) Silentbarker 4	NRO/USSF	Geosynchronous	Space Situational Awareness		
2027 (TBD)	(United States) Silentbarker 5	NRO/USSF	Geosynchronous	Space Situational Awareness		
2027 (TBD)	(United States) Silentbarker 6	NRO/USSF	Geosynchronous	Space Situational Awareness		
2027 (TBD)	NROL-118 Mission.					
2027 (TBD)	(United States) Vulcan Centaur		(United States) Cape Canaveral SLC-41		(United States) ULA	
2027 (TBD)	(United States) TBA	NRO	TBA	TBA		
2027 (TBD)	NROL-56 Mission.					
2027 (TBD)	(United States) Vulcan Centaur		(United States) Vandenberg SLC-3E		(United States) ULA	
2027 (TBD)	(United States) TBA	NRO	TBA	TBA		
2027 (TBD)	NROL-73 Mission.					
2027 (TBD)	(United States) Vulcan Centaur		(United States) Vandenberg SLC-3E		(United States) ULA	
2027 (TBD)	(United States) TBA	NRO	TBA	TBA		
2027 (TBD)	NROL-100 Mission.					
2027 (TBD)	(United States) Vulcan Centaur		(United States) Cape Canaveral SLC-41		(United States) ULA	
2027 (TBD)	(United States) TBA	NRO	TBA	TBA		
2027 (TBD)	NROL-109 Mission.					
2027 (TBD)	(United States) Vulcan Centaur		(United States) Cape Canaveral SLC-41		(United States) ULA	
2027 (TBD)	(United States) NG-OPIR-GEO 1 (NGG-1)	U.S. Space Force	Geosynchronous	Early warning		
2027 (TBD)	USSF-57 mission. First satellite of the Next-Generation Overhead Persistent InfraRed (NG-OPIR) constellation, follow-up of SBIRS.					
2027 (TBD)	(United States) Vulcan Centaur		(United States) Cape Canaveral SLC-41		(United States) ULA	
2027 (TBD)	(United States) SIRI-3	NRL	Low Earth	TBA		
2027 (TBD)	(United States) PUMA	AFRL	Low Earth	TBA		
2027 (TBD)	STP-5 Mission.					
2027 (TBD)	(United States) Vulcan Centaur		(United States) Cape Canaveral SLC-41		(United States) ULA	
2027 (TBD)	(United States) MTC Epoch-1 1	U.S. Space Force	Medium Earth	Missile tracking		
2027 (TBD)	USSF-95 Mission.					
2027 (TBD)	(India) LVM3		(India) Satish Dhawan SLP		(India) ISRO	
2027 (TBD)	(India) Chandrayaan-4 Propulsion Module	ISRO	Selenocentric	Lunar sample-return		
2027 (TBD)	(India) Chandrayaan-4 Lander Module	ISRO	TLI to Lunar south pole	Lunar lander		
2027 (TBD)	(India) Chandrayaan-4 Ascender Module	ISRO	lunar surface to Selenocentric	Space rendezvous		
2027 (TBD)	First of two LVM3 for ISRO's Chandrayaan-4 Lunar Sample-return Mission. Chandrayaan-4 Propulsion, Lander and Ascender Modules.					
2027 (TBD)	(India) LVM3		(India) Satish Dhawan SLP		(India) ISRO	
2027 (TBD)	(India) Chandrayaan-4 Transfer Module	ISRO	Selenocentric to TEI	Space rendezvous		
2027 (TBD)	(India) Chandrayaan-4 Re-entry Module	ISRO	TEI to Earth	Lunar sample-return		
2027 (TBD)	Second of two LVM3 for ISRO's Chandrayaan-4 Lunar Sample-return Mission. Chandrayaan-4 Transfer and Re-entry Modules.					
2027 (TBD)	(United States) New Glenn	LN-02	(United States) Cape Canaveral LC-36		(United States) Blue Origin	
2027 (TBD)	(United States) KuiperSat × 48	Amazon Leo	Low Earth	Communications		
2027 (TBD)	Second of 24 New Glenn launches for Amazon's Amazon Leo.					
2027 (TBD)	(United States) New Glenn	LN-03	(United States) Cape Canaveral LC-36		(United States) Blue Origin	
2027 (TBD)	(United States) KuiperSat × 48	Amazon Leo	Low Earth	Communications		
2027 (TBD)	Third of 24 New Glenn launches for Amazon's Amazon Leo.					
2027 (TBD)	(United States) New Glenn	LN-04	(United States) Cape Canaveral LC-36		(United States) Blue Origin	
2027 (TBD)	(United States) KuiperSat × 48	Amazon Leo	Low Earth	Communications		
2027 (TBD)	Fourth of 24 New Glenn launches for Amazon's Amazon Leo.					
2027 (TBD)	(United States) New Glenn	LN-05	(United States) Cape Canaveral LC-36		(United States) Blue Origin	
2027 (TBD)	(United States) KuiperSat × 48	Amazon Leo	Low Earth	Communications		
2027 (TBD)	Fifth of 24 New Glenn launches for Amazon's Amazon Leo.					
2027 (TBD)	(United States) New Glenn	LN-06	(United States) Cape Canaveral LC-36		(United States) Blue Origin	
2027 (TBD)	(United States) KuiperSat × 48	Amazon Leo	Low Earth	Communications		
2027 (TBD)	Sixth of 24 New Glenn launches for Amazon's Amazon Leo.					
2027 (TBD)	(United States) New Glenn	LN-07	(United States) Cape Canaveral LC-36		(United States) Blue Origin	
2027 (TBD)	(United States) KuiperSat × 48	Amazon Leo	Low Earth	Communications		
2027 (TBD)	Seventh of 24 New Glenn launches for Amazon's Amazon Leo.					
2027 (TBD)	(United States) New Glenn	LN-08	(United States) Cape Canaveral LC-36		(United States) Blue Origin	
2027 (TBD)	(United States) KuiperSat × 48	Amazon Leo	Low Earth	Communications		
2027 (TBD)	Eighth of 24 New Glenn launches for Amazon's Amazon Leo.					
2027 (TBD)	(United States) New Glenn	LN-09	(United States) Cape Canaveral LC-36		(United States) Blue Origin	
2027 (TBD)	(United States) KuiperSat × 48	Amazon Leo	Low Earth	Communications		
2027 (TBD)	Ninth of 24 New Glenn launches for Amazon's Amazon Leo.					
2027 (TBD)	(United States) New Glenn	LN-10	(United States) Cape Canaveral LC-36		(United States) Blue Origin	
2027 (TBD)	(United States) KuiperSat × 48	Amazon Leo	Low Earth	Communications		
2027 (TBD)	Tenth of 24 New Glenn launches for Amazon's Amazon Leo.					
2027 (TBD)	(United States) New Glenn	LN-11	(United States) Cape Canaveral LC-36		(United States) Blue Origin	
2027 (TBD)	(United States) KuiperSat × 48	Amazon Leo	Low Earth	Communications		
2027 (TBD)	Eleventh of 24 New Glenn launches for Amazon's Amazon Leo.					
2027 (TBD)	(United States) New Glenn	LN-12	(United States) Cape Canaveral LC-36		(United States) Blue Origin	
2027 (TBD)	(United States) KuiperSat × 48	Amazon Leo	Low Earth	Communications		
2027 (TBD)	Twelfth of 24 New Glenn launches for Amazon's Amazon Leo.					
2027 (TBD)	(France) Ariane 64	LE-05	(France) Kourou ELA-4		(France) Arianespace	
2027 (TBD)	(United States) LeoSat × 35	Amazon Leo	Low Earth	Communications		
2027 (TBD)	Fifth of 18 Ariane 6 launches for Amazon's Amazon Leo.					
2027 (TBD)	(France) Ariane 64	LE-06	(France) Kourou ELA-4		(France) Arianespace	
2027 (TBD)	(United States) LeoSat × 35	Amazon Leo	Low Earth	Communications		
2027 (TBD)	Sixth of 18 Ariane 6 launches for Amazon's Amazon Leo.					
2027 (TBD)	(France) Ariane 64	LE-07	(France) Kourou ELA-4		(France) Arianespace	
2027 (TBD)	(United States) LeoSat × 35	Amazon Leo	Low Earth	Communications		
2027 (TBD)	Seventh of 18 Ariane 6 launches for Amazon's Amazon Leo.					
2027 (TBD)	(France) Ariane 64	LE-08	(France) Kourou ELA-4		(France) Arianespace	
2027 (TBD)	(United States) LeoSat × 35	Amazon Leo	Low Earth	Communications		
2027 (TBD)	Eighth of 18 Ariane 6 launches for Amazon's Amazon Leo.					
2027 (TBD)	(France) Ariane 64	LE-09	(France) Kourou ELA-4		(France) Arianespace	
2027 (TBD)	(United States) LeoSat × 35	Amazon Leo	Low Earth	Communications		
2027 (TBD)	Ninth of 18 Ariane 6 launches for Amazon's Amazon Leo.					
2027 (TBD)	(France) Ariane 64	LE-10	(France) Kourou ELA-4		(France) Arianespace	
2027 (TBD)	(United States) LeoSat × 35	Amazon Leo	Low Earth	Communications		
2027 (TBD)	Tenth of 18 Ariane 6 launches for Amazon's Amazon Leo.					
2027 (TBD)	(France) Ariane 64	LE-11	(France) Kourou ELA-4		(France) Arianespace	
2027 (TBD)	(United States) LeoSat × 35	Amazon Leo	Low Earth	Communications		
2027 (TBD)	Eleventh of 18 Ariane 6 launches for Amazon's Amazon Leo.					
2027 (TBD)	(United States) Vulcan Centaur VC6L	LV-04	(United States) Cape Canaveral SLC-41		(United States) ULA	
2027 (TBD)	(United States) KuiperSat × 45	Amazon Leo	Low Earth	Communications		
2027 (TBD)	Fourth of 38 Vulcan Centaur launches for Amazon's Amazon Leo. Mission Designated "Vulcan Leo Mission #4 (LV-04)"					
2027 (TBD)	(United States) Vulcan Centaur VC6L	LV-05	(United States) Cape Canaveral SLC-41		(United States) ULA	
2027 (TBD)	(United States) KuiperSat × 45	Amazon Leo	Low Earth	Communications		
2027 (TBD)	Fifth of 38 Vulcan Centaur launches for Amazon's Amazon Leo. Mission Designated "Vulcan Leo Mission #5 (LV-05)"					
2027 (TBD)	(United States) Vulcan Centaur VC6L	LV-06	(United States) Cape Canaveral SLC-41		(United States) ULA	
2027 (TBD)	(United States) KuiperSat × 45	Amazon Leo	Low Earth	Communications		
2027 (TBD)	Sixth of 38 Vulcan Centaur launches for Amazon's Amazon Leo. Mission Designated "Vulcan Leo Mission #6 (LV-06)"					
2027 (TBD)	(United States) Vulcan Centaur VC6L	LV-07	(United States) Cape Canaveral SLC-41		(United States) ULA	
2027 (TBD)	(United States) KuiperSat × 45	Amazon Leo	Low Earth	Communications		
2027 (TBD)	Seventh of 38 Vulcan Centaur launches for Amazon's Amazon Leo. Mission Designated "Vulcan Leo Mission #7 (LV-07)"					
2027 (TBD)	(United States) Vulcan Centaur VC6L	LV-08	(United States) Cape Canaveral SLC-41		(United States) ULA	
2027 (TBD)	(United States) KuiperSat × 45	Amazon Leo	Low Earth	Communications		
2027 (TBD)	Eighth of 38 Vulcan Centaur launches for Amazon's Amazon Leo. Mission Designated "Vulcan Leo Mission #8 (LV-08)"					
2027 (TBD)	(United States) Vulcan Centaur VC6L	LV-09	(United States) Cape Canaveral SLC-41		(United States) ULA	
2027 (TBD)	(United States) KuiperSat × 45	Amazon Leo	Low Earth	Communications		
2027 (TBD)	Ninth of 38 Vulcan Centaur launches for Amazon's Amazon Leo. Mission Designated "Vulcan Leo Mission #9 (LV-09)"					
2027 (TBD)	(United States) Vulcan Centaur VC6L	LV-10	(United States) Cape Canaveral SLC-41		(United States) ULA	
2027 (TBD)	(United States) KuiperSat × 45	Amazon Leo	Low Earth	Communications		
2027 (TBD)	Tenth of 38 Vulcan Centaur launches for Amazon's Amazon Leo. Mission Designated "Vulcan Leo Mission #10 (LV-10)"					
2027 (TBD)	(United States) Vulcan Centaur VC6L	LV-11	(United States) Cape Canaveral SLC-41		(United States) ULA	
2027 (TBD)	(United States) KuiperSat × 45	Amazon Leo	Low Earth	Communications		
2027 (TBD)	Eleventh of 38 Vulcan Centaur launches for Amazon's Amazon Leo. Mission Designated "Vulcan Leo Mission #11 (LV-11)"					
2027 (TBD)	(United States) Vulcan Centaur VC6L	LV-12	(United States) Cape Canaveral SLC-41		(United States) ULA	
2027 (TBD)	(United States) KuiperSat × 45	Amazon Leo	Low Earth	Communications		
2027 (TBD)	Twelfth of 38 Vulcan Centaur launches for Amazon's Amazon Leo. Mission Designated "Vulcan Leo Mission #12 (LV-12)"					
2027 (TBD)	(United States) Vulcan Centaur VC6L	LV-13	(United States) Cape Canaveral SLC-41		(United States) ULA	
2027 (TBD)	(United States) LeoSat × 45	Amazon Leo	Low Earth	Communications		
2027 (TBD)	Thirteenth of 38 Vulcan Centaur launches for Amazon's Amazon Leo.					
2027 (TBD)	(United States) Vulcan Centaur VC6L	LV-14	(United States) Cape Canaveral SLC-41		(United States) ULA	
2027 (TBD)	(United States) LeoSat × 45	Amazon Leo	Low Earth	Communications		
2027 (TBD)	Fourteenth of 38 Vulcan Centaur launches for Amazon's Amazon Leo.					
2027 (TBD)	(United States) Vulcan Centaur VC6L	LV-15	(United States) Cape Canaveral SLC-41		(United States) ULA	
2027 (TBD)	(United States) LeoSat × 45	Amazon Leo	Low Earth	Communications		
2027 (TBD)	Fifteenth of 38 Vulcan Centaur launches for Amazon's Amazon Leo.					
2027 (TBD)	(United States) Vulcan Centaur VC6L	LV-16	(United States) Cape Canaveral SLC-41		(United States) ULA	
2027 (TBD)	(United States) LeoSat × 45	Amazon Leo	Low Earth	Communications		
2027 (TBD)	Sixteenth of 38 Vulcan Centaur launches for Amazon's Amazon Leo.					
2027 (TBD)	(United States) Vulcan Centaur VC6L	LV-17	(United States) Cape Canaveral SLC-41		(United States) ULA	
2027 (TBD)	(United States) LeoSat × 45	Amazon Leo	Low Earth	Communications		
2027 (TBD)	Seventeenth of 38 Vulcan Centaur launches for Amazon's Amazon Leo.					
2027 (TBD)	(United States) Vulcan Centaur VC6L	LV-18	(United States) Cape Canaveral SLC-41		(United States) ULA	
2027 (TBD)	(United States) LeoSat × 45	Amazon Leo	Low Earth	Communications		
2027 (TBD)	Eighteenth of 38 Vulcan Centaur launches for Amazon's Amazon Leo.					
2027 (TBD)	(United States) Vulcan Centaur VC6L	LV-19	(United States) Cape Canaveral SLC-41		(United States) ULA	
2027 (TBD)	(United States) LeoSat × 45	Amazon Leo	Low Earth	Communications		
2027 (TBD)	Nineteenth of 38 Vulcan Centaur launches for Amazon's Amazon Leo.					
2027 (TBD)	(United States) Vulcan Centaur VC6L	LV-20	(United States) Cape Canaveral SLC-41		(United States) ULA	
2027 (TBD)	(United States) LeoSat × 45	Amazon Leo	Low Earth	Communications		
2027 (TBD)	Twentieth of 38 Vulcan Centaur launches for Amazon's Amazon Leo.					
2027 (TBD)	(United States) Vulcan Centaur VC6L	LV-21	(United States) Cape Canaveral SLC-41		(United States) ULA	
2027 (TBD)	(United States) LeoSat × 45	Amazon Leo	Low Earth	Communications		
2027 (TBD)	Twenty-first of 38 Vulcan Centaur launches for Amazon's Amazon Leo.					
2027 (TBD)	(United States) Vulcan Centaur VC6L	LV-22	(United States) Cape Canaveral SLC-41		(United States) ULA	
2027 (TBD)	(United States) LeoSat × 45	Amazon Leo	Low Earth	Communications		
2027 (TBD)	Twenty-second of 38 Vulcan Centaur launches for Amazon's Amazon Leo.					
2027 (TBD)	(United States) Neutron		(United States) Wallops LC-3		(United States) Rocket Lab	
2027 (TBD)	(United States)	Rocket Lab	TBA	Test flight		
2027 (TBD)	Maiden flight of the Rocket Lab Neutron					
2027 (TBD)	(United Kingdom) Skyrora XL		(United Kingdom) SaxaVord		(United Kingdom) Skyrora	
2027 (TBD)	(United Kingdom)	Skyrora	TBA	Flight test		
2027 (TBD)	Maiden flight of Skyrora's Skyrora XL.					
2027 (TBD)	(Germany) SL1		(Sweden) Esrange		(Germany) HyImpulse	
2027 (TBD)	(United States) Reentry capsule	In Orbit Aerospace	Low Earth	Technology demonstration		
2027 (TBD)	Maiden flight of HyImpulse's SL1. HyImpulse is a spinoff of DLR.					
2027 (TBD)	(France) Ariane 64		(France) Kourou ELA-4		(France) Arianespace	
2027 (TBD)	(Australia) Optus-11	Optus	Geosynchronous	Communications		
2027 (TBD)	(Italy) Vega-E		(France) Kourou ELV		(France) Arianespace	
2027 (TBD)	TBA	ESA	Low Earth	Flight test		
2027 (TBD)	First flight of Vega-E.					
2027 (TBD)	(India) HLVM3		(India) Satish Dhawan SLP		(India) ISRO	
2027 (TBD)	(India) Gaganyaan-3 (G3)	ISRO	Low Earth	Flight test		
2027 (TBD)	Third Gaganyaan flight test. Will carry the Vyommitra humanoid robot.					
2027 (TBD)	(United States) Falcon 9		(United States) Cape Canaveral SLC-40		(United States) SpaceX	
2027 (TBD)	(South Korea) KOMPSAT-7A	KARI	Low Earth (SSO)	Earth observation		
2027 (TBD)	(Italy) PLATiNO-1	Thales Alenia Space Italy	Low Earth (SSO)	Technology demonstration		
2027 (TBD)	(United States) Firefly Alpha Block-2		(United States) Vandenberg SLC-2W		(United States) Firefly Aerospace	
2027 (TBD)	(United States) TacSat	Lockheed Martin	Low Earth	Reconnaissance satellite		
2027 (TBD)	(United States) Electron		(New Zealand) Mahia LC-1A		(United States) Rocket Lab	
2027 (TBD)	(Japan) StriX-15	Synspective	Low Earth	Earth observation		
2027 (TBD)	(United States) Electron		(New Zealand) Mahia LC-1A		(United States) Rocket Lab	
2027 (TBD)	(Japan) StriX-16	Synspective	Low Earth	Earth observation		
2027 (TBD)	(United States) Falcon 9 Block 5		(United States) Vandenberg SLC-4E		(United States) SpaceX	
2027 (TBD)	(United States) JPSS-4	NOAA	Low Earth (SSO)	Meteorology		
2027 (TBD)	(United States) Falcon 9 Block 5		(United States) Cape Canaveral SLC-40		(United States) SpaceX	
2027 (TBD)	(United States) Transport Layer Tranche 2 × 21	SDA	Low Earth (Polar orbit)	Military communications		
2027 (TBD)	(United States) Falcon 9 Block 5		(United States) Vandenberg SLC-4E		(United States) SpaceX	
2027 (TBD)	(United States) Transport Layer Tranche 2 × 21	SDA	Low Earth (Polar orbit)	Military communications		
2027 (TBD)	(United States) Falcon 9 Block 5		(United States) Vandenberg SLC-4E		(United States) SpaceX	
2027 (TBD)	(United States) Transport Layer Tranche 2 × 21	SDA	Low Earth (Polar orbit)	Military communications		
2027 (TBD)	(United States) Falcon 9 Block 5		(United States) Vandenberg SLC-4E		(United States) SpaceX	
2027 (TBD)	(United States) Transport Layer Tranche 2 × 21	SDA	Low Earth (Polar orbit)	Military communications		
2027 (TBD)	(United States) Falcon 9 Block 5		(United States) Vandenberg SLC-4E		(United States) SpaceX	
2027 (TBD)	(United States) Transport Layer Tranche 2 × 21	SDA	Low Earth (Polar orbit)	Military communications		
2027 (TBD)	(United States) Falcon 9 Block 5		(United States) Cape Canaveral SLC-40		(United States) SpaceX	
2027 (TBD)	(United States) Transport Layer Tranche 2 × 21	SDA	Low Earth (Polar orbit)	Military communications		
2027 (TBD)	(United States) Falcon 9 Block 5		(United States) Cape Canaveral SLC-40		(United States) SpaceX	
2027 (TBD)	(United States) Transport Layer Tranche 2 × 21	SDA	Low Earth (Polar orbit)	Military communications		
2027 (TBD)	(India) GSLV Mk II		(India) Satish Dhawan SLP		(India) ISRO	
2027 (TBD)	(India) IDRSS-1	ISRO	Geosynchronous	Communications		
2027 (TBD)	First of two Satellite for Indian Data Relay satellite System.					
2027 (TBD)	(India) GSLV Mk II		(India) Satish Dhawan SLP		(India) ISRO	
2027 (TBD)	(India) IDRSS-2	ISRO	Geosynchronous	Communications		
2027 (TBD)	Second of two Satellite for Indian Data Relay satellite System.					
2027 (TBD)	(India) SSLV		(India) Satish Dhawan		(India) ISRO	
2027 (TBD)	(Australia) Optimus	Space Machines Company	Low Earth	Space tug		
2027 (TBD)	Space MAITRI (Mission for Australia-India's Technology, Research and Innovation). First dedicated commercial SSLV launch.					
2027 (TBD)	(United States) Alpha		(United States) MARS LP-0A		(United States) Firefly Aerospace	
2027 (TBD)	(United States) INCUS Observatory-1	NASA	Low Earth (SSO)	Meteorology		
2027 (TBD)	(United States) INCUS Observatory-2	NASA	Low Earth (SSO)	Meteorology		
2027 (TBD)	(United States) INCUS Observatory-3	NASA	Low Earth (SSO)	Meteorology		
2027 (TBD)	(United States) Vulcan Centaur		(United States) Cape Canaveral SLC-41		(United States) ULA	
2027 (TBD)	TBA	U.S. Space Force	Geosynchronous	Early warning		
2027 (TBD)	USSF-50 Mission.					
2027 (TBD)	(United States) Falcon Heavy		(United States) Kennedy LC-39A		(United States) SpaceX	
2027 (TBD)	(United States) TBA	U.S. Space Force	TBA	TBA		
2027 (TBD)	USSF-174 Mission.					
2027 (TBD)	(United States) Falcon Heavy		(United States) Kennedy LC-39A		(United States) SpaceX	
2027 (TBD)	(United States) TBA	U.S. Space Force	TBA	TBA		
2027 (TBD)	USSF-186 Mission.					
2027 (TBD)	(United States) Falcon 9 Block 5		(United States) Cape Canaveral SLC-40		(United States) SpaceX	
2027 (TBD)	(United States) TBA	U.S. Space Force	TBA	TBA		
2027 (TBD)	USSF-234 Mission.					
2027 (TBD)	(United States) Falcon 9 Block 5		(United States) Vandenberg SLC-4E		(United States) SpaceX	
2027 (TBD)	(United States) TBA	NRO	TBA	TBA		
2027 (TBD)	NROL-96 Mission.					
2027 (TBD)	(United States) Falcon 9 Block 5		(United States) Vandenberg SLC-4E		(United States) SpaceX	
2027 (TBD)	(United States) TBA	NRO	TBA	TBA		
2027 (TBD)	NROL-157 Mission.					
2027 (TBD)	(United States) Firefly Alpha Block-2		(United States) Vandenberg SLC-2W		(United States) Firefly Aerospace	
2027 (TBD)	(United States) VICTUS SOL	United States Space Force	Low Earth	Technology demonstration		
2027 (TBD)	(United States) Electron		(New Zealand) Mahia LC-1A		(United States) Rocket Lab	
2027 (TBD)	(Japan) StriX-17	Synspective	Low Earth	Earth observation		
2027 (TBD)	(United States) Electron		(New Zealand) Mahia LC-1A		(United States) Rocket Lab	
2027 (TBD)	(Japan) StriX-18	Synspective	Low Earth	Earth observation		
2027 (TBD)	(United States) Electron		(New Zealand) Mahia LC-1A		(United States) Rocket Lab	
2027 (TBD)	(Japan) StriX-19	Synspective	Low Earth	Earth observation		
2027 (TBD)	(United States) Electron		(New Zealand) Mahia LC-1A		(United States) Rocket Lab	
2027 (TBD)	(Japan) StriX-20	Synspective	Low Earth	Earth observation		
2027 (TBD)	(United States) Electron		(New Zealand) Mahia LC-1A		(United States) Rocket Lab	
2027 (TBD)	(Japan) StriX-21	Synspective	Low Earth	Earth observation		
2027 (TBD)	(United States) Falcon Heavy		(United States) Kennedy LC-39A		(United States) SpaceX	
2027 (TBD)	(United States) TBA	U.S. Space Force	TBA	TBA		
2027 (TBD)	USSF-155 Mission.					
2027 (TBD)	(United States) Falcon Heavy		(United States) Kennedy LC-39A		(United States) SpaceX	
2027 (TBD)	(United States) TBA	U.S. Space Force	TBA	TBA		
2027 (TBD)	NROL-86 Mission.					
2027 (TBD)	(United States) Falcon 9 Block 5		(United States) Cape Canaveral SLC-40		(United States) SpaceX	
2027 (TBD)	(United States) TBA	U.S. Space Force	TBA	TBA		
2027 (TBD)	USSF-149 Mission.					
2027 (TBD)	(United States) Vulcan Centaur		(United States) Cape Canaveral SLC-41		(United States) ULA	
2027 (TBD)	(United States) TBA	U.S. Space Force	TBA	TBA		
2027 (TBD)	NROL-88 Mission.					
2027 (TBD)	(China) Long March 10		(China) Wenchang LC-3		(China) CASC	
2027 (TBD)	(China)	CNSA	Low Earth	Flight test		
2027 (TBD)	First flight of China's triple-core crew launch vehicle for Moon missions, previously known as the 921 rocket or the Long March 5 Dengyue.					
2027 (TBD)	(United States) Falcon 9 Block 5		(United States) Cape Canaveral SLC-40		(United States) SpaceX	
2027 (TBD)	(Mongolia) Chinggis Sat	TBA	Geosynchronous	TBA		
2027 (TBD)	(United States) Falcon 9 Block 5		(United States) Cape Canaveral SLC-40		(United States) SpaceX	
2027 (TBD)	(Japan) JSAT-32	SKY Perfect JSAT	Geosynchronous	Communications		
2027 (TBD)	(South Korea) Nuri		(South Korea) Naro LC-2		(South Korea) KARI	
2027 (TBD)	(South Korea) NeonSat ×5	KAIST	Low Earth (SSO)	Earth Observation		
2027 (TBD)	⚀ (South Korea) Suncheonsat-1	Suncheon City	Low Earth (SSO)	Earth Observation		
2027 (TBD)	⚀ (South Korea) K-STAR	National Security Research Institute	Low Earth (SSO)	Technology demonstration		
2027 (TBD)	⚀ (South Korea) KAFASAT-2	Korea Air Force Academy	Low Earth (SSO)	Technology demonstration		
2027 (TBD)	⚀ (South Korea) GAIMSat-1	Gwangju City	Low Earth (SSO)	Technology demonstration		
2027 (TBD)	⚀ (South Korea) KMU ET-02	Kookmin University	Low Earth (SSO)	Earth Observation		
2027 (TBD)	⚀ (South Korea) Demonstrator for Deep Space Exploration	KARI	Low Earth (SSO)	Technology demonstration		
2027 (TBD)	(South Korea) Satellite for Verifying Domestic Components No. 3	KARI	Low Earth (SSO)	Technology demonstration		
2027 (TBD)	(South Korea) ADRSat	KAIST	Low Earth (SSO)	Technology demonstration		
2027 (TBD)	(United States) Vulcan Centaur		(United States) TBA		(United States) SpaceX	
2027 (TBD)	(United States) Tracking Layer Tranche 2 × 7	SDA	Low Earth	Missile tracking		
2027 (TBD)	(United States) Vulcan Centaur		(United States) TBA		(United States) SpaceX	
2027 (TBD)	(United States) Tracking Layer Tranche 2 × 7	SDA	Low Earth	Missile tracking		
2027 (TBD)	(United States) Vulcan Centaur		(United States) TBA		(United States) SpaceX	
2027 (TBD)	(United States) Tracking Layer Tranche 2 × 7	SDA	Low Earth	Missile tracking		
2027 (TBD)	(United States) Vulcan Centaur		(United States) TBA		(United States) SpaceX	
2027 (TBD)	(United States) Tracking Layer Tranche 2 × 7	SDA	Low Earth	Missile tracking		
2027 (TBD)	(Italy) Vega-C		(France) Kourou ELV		(France) Arianespace	
2027 (TBD)	(Taiwan) FORMOSAT-8C	TASA	Low Earth (SSO)	Earth observation		
2027 (TBD)	(Italy) Vega-C		(France) Kourou ELV		(France) Arianespace	
2027 (TBD)	(Brazil) Amazonia 1B	INPE	Low Earth (SSO)	Earth observation		
2027 (TBD)	(United States) Falcon 9 Block 5	LF-04	(United States) Cape Canaveral SLC-40		(United States) SpaceX	
2027 (TBD)	(United States) Amazon Leo × 24	Amazon Leo	Low Earth	Communications		
2027 (TBD)	Fourth of 13 Falcon 9 launches for Project Kuiper.					
2027 (TBD)	(United States) Falcon 9 Block 5	LF-05	(United States) Cape Canaveral SLC-40		(United States) SpaceX	
2027 (TBD)	(United States) Amazon Leo × 24	Amazon Leo	Low Earth	Communications		
2027 (TBD)	Fifth of 13 Falcon 9 launches for Project Kuiper.					
2027 (TBD)	(United States) Falcon 9 Block 5	LF-06	(United States) Cape Canaveral SLC-40		(United States) SpaceX	
2027 (TBD)	(United States) Amazon Leo × 24	Amazon Leo	Low Earth	Communications		
2027 (TBD)	Sixth of 13 Falcon 9 launches for Project Kuiper.					
2027 (TBD)	(United States) Falcon 9 Block 5	LF-07	(United States) Cape Canaveral SLC-40		(United States) SpaceX	
2027 (TBD)	(United States) Amazon Leo × 24	Amazon Leo	Low Earth	Communications		
2027 (TBD)	Seventh of 13 Falcon 9 launches for Project Kuiper.					
2027 (TBD)	(United States) Falcon 9 Block 5	LF-08	(United States) Cape Canaveral SLC-40		(United States) SpaceX	
2027 (TBD)	(United States) Amazon Leo × 24	Amazon Leo	Low Earth	Communications		
2027 (TBD)	Eighth of 13 Falcon 9 launches for Project Kuiper.					
2027 (TBD)	(United States) Falcon 9 Block 5	LF-09	(United States) Cape Canaveral SLC-40		(United States) SpaceX	
2027 (TBD)	(United States) Amazon Leo × 24	Amazon Leo	Low Earth	Communications		
2027 (TBD)	Ninth of 13 Falcon 9 launches for Project Kuiper.					
2027 (TBD)	(United States) Falcon 9 Block 5	LF-10	(United States) Cape Canaveral SLC-40		(United States) SpaceX	
2027 (TBD)	(United States) Amazon Leo × 24	Amazon Leo	Low Earth	Communications		
2027 (TBD)	Tenth of 13 Falcon 9 launches for Project Kuiper.					
2027 (TBD)	(United States) Falcon 9 Block 5	LF-11	(United States) Cape Canaveral SLC-40		(United States) SpaceX	
2027 (TBD)	(United States) Amazon Leo × 24	Amazon Leo	Low Earth	Communications		
2027 (TBD)	Eleventh of 13 Falcon 9 launches for Project Kuiper.					
2027 (TBD)	(United States) Falcon 9 Block 5	LF-12	(United States) Cape Canaveral SLC-40		(United States) SpaceX	
2027 (TBD)	(United States) Amazon Leo × 24	Amazon Leo	Low Earth	Communications		
2027 (TBD)	Twelfth of 13 Falcon 9 launches for Project Kuiper.					
2027 (TBD)	(United States) Falcon 9 Block 5	LF-13	(United States) Cape Canaveral SLC-40		(United States) SpaceX	
2027 (TBD)	(United States) Amazon Leo × 24	Amazon Leo	Low Earth	Communications		
2027 (TBD)	Last of 13 Falcon 9 launches for Project Kuiper.					
2027 (TBD)	(United States) Falcon 9 Block 5		(United States) Cape Canaveral SLC-40		(United States) SpaceX	
2027 (TBD)	(United Kingdom) GX-7	Inmarsat	Geosynchronous	Communications		
2027 (TBD)	(Spain) Miura 5		(France) Kourou ELD		(Spain) PLD Space	
2027 (TBD)	(Spain) Trito 1 and 2	Sateliot	Low Earth	Communications satellite		
2027 (TBD)	(United States) Electron		(New Zealand) Mahia LC-1A		(United States) Rocket Lab	
2027 (TBD)	(United States) BlackSky Gen-3 Mission 9	BlackSky Technology	Low Earth (SSO)	Earth Observation		
2027 (TBD)	(United States) Falcon 9		(United States) TBA		(United States) SpaceX	
2027 (TBD)	(United States) Tracking Layer Tranche 2 × 7	SDA	Low Earth	Missile tracking		
2027 (TBD)	(United States) Falcon 9		(United States) TBA		(United States) SpaceX	
2027 (TBD)	(United States) Tracking Layer Tranche 2 × 7	SDA	Low Earth	Missile tracking		
2027 (TBD)	(United States) Electron		(New Zealand) Mahia LC-1		(United States) Rocket Lab	
2027 (TBD)	(Japan) iQPS Mission 13	iQPS	Low Earth	Earth observation satellite		
2027 (TBD)	(United States) Electron		(New Zealand) Mahia LC-1		(United States) Rocket Lab	
2027 (TBD)	(Japan) iQPS Mission 14	iQPS	Low Earth	Earth observation satellite		
2027 (TBD)	(United States) Electron		(New Zealand) Mahia LC-1		(United States) Rocket Lab	
2027 (TBD)	(Japan) iQPS Mission 15	iQPS	Low Earth	Earth observation satellite		
2027 (TBD)	(United States) Firefly Alpha		(United States) Vandenberg SLC-2W		(United States) Firefly Aerospace	
2027 (TBD)	(United Kingdom) ConnectedCosmos Launch 1	Open Cosmos	Low Earth	Communications satellite		
2027 (TBD)	First launch of 6 ConnectedCosmos satellites					
2027 (TBD)	(United States) Firefly Alpha		(United States) Vandenberg SLC-2W		(United States) Firefly Aerospace	
2027 (TBD)	(United Kingdom) ConnectedCosmos Launch 2	Open Cosmos	Low Earth	Communications satellite		
2027 (TBD)	Second launch of 6 ConnectedCosmos satellites					
2027 (TBD)	(United States) Firefly Alpha		(United States) Vandenberg SLC-2W		(United States) Firefly Aerospace	
2027 (TBD)	(United Kingdom) ConnectedCosmos Launch 3	Open Cosmos	Low Earth	Communications satellite		
2027 (TBD)	Third launch of 6 ConnectedCosmos satellite					
2027 (TBD)	(United States) Firefly Alpha		(United States) Vandenberg SLC-2W		(United Kingdom) Firefly Aerospace	
2027 (TBD)	(United Kingdom) ConnectedCosmos Launch 4	Open Cosmos	Low Earth	Communications satellite		
2027 (TBD)	Fourth launch of 6 ConnectedCosmos satellite					
2027 (TBD)	(United States) Antares 330		(United States) Wallops LP-0A		(United States) Northrop Grumman	
2027 (TBD)	(United States) Cygnus NG-26	NASA	Low Earth (ISS)	ISS logistics		
2027 (TBD)	(United States) Antares 330		(United States) Wallops LP-0A		(United States) Northrop Grumman	
2027 (TBD)	(United States) Cygnus NG-27	NASA	Low Earth (ISS)	ISS logistics		
2027 (TBD)	(United States) Falcon 9		(United States) Cape Canaveral SLC-40		(United States) SpaceX	
2027 (TBD)	(Germany) COMSATBw 3	Bundeswehr	Geosynchronous	Military Communication		
2027 (TBD)	(United States) Electron		(New Zealand) Mahia LC-1		(United States) Rocket Lab	
2027 (TBD)	(Japan) iQPS Mission 16	iQPS	Low Earth	Earth observation satellite		
2027 (TBD)	(United States) Falcon 9		(United States) Vandenburg SLC-4E		(United States) SpaceX	
2027 (TBD)	(United States) Space-Based Sensing and Targeting Launch 9	USSF	Low earth	Military satellite		
2027 (TBD)	(United States) Falcon 9		(United States) Vandenburg SLC-4E		(United States) SpaceX	
2027 (TBD)	(United States) Space-Based Sensing and Targeting Launch 10	USSF	Low earth	Military satellite		
2027 (TBD)	(United States) Falcon 9		(United States) Vandenburg SLC-4E		(United States) SpaceX	
2027 (TBD)	(United States) Space-Based Sensing and Targeting Launch 11	USSF	Low earth	Military satellite		
2027 (TBD)	(United States) Falcon 9		(United States) Vandenburg SLC-4E		(United States) SpaceX	
2027 (TBD)	(United States) Space-Based Sensing and Targeting Launch 12	USSF	Low earth	Military satellite		
2027 (TBD)	(United States) Falcon 9		(United States) Vandenburg SLC-4E		(United States) SpaceX	
2027 (TBD)	(United States) Space-Based Sensing and Targeting Launch 13	USSF	Low earth	Military satellite		
2027 (TBD)	(United States) Falcon 9		(United States) Vandenburg SLC-4E		(United States) SpaceX	
2027 (TBD)	(United States) Space-Based Sensing and Targeting Launch 14	USSF	Low earth	Military satellite		
2027 (TBD)	(United States) Falcon 9		(United States) Vandenburg SLC-4E		(United States) SpaceX	
2027 (TBD)	(United States) Space-Based Sensing and Targeting Launch 15	USSF	Low earth	Military satellite		
2027 (TBD)	(United States) Falcon 9		(United States) Vandenburg SLC-4E		(United States) SpaceX	
2027 (TBD)	(United States) Space-Based Sensing and Targeting Launch 16	USSF	Low earth	Military satellite		
2027 (TBD)	(United States) Falcon 9		(United States) Vandenburg SLC-4E		(United States) SpaceX	
2027 (TBD)	(United States) Space-Based Sensing and Targeting Launch 17	USSF	Low earth	Military satellite		
2027 (TBD)	(United States) Falcon 9		(United States) Vandenburg SLC-4E		(United States) SpaceX	
2027 (TBD)	(United States) Space-Based Sensing and Targeting Launch 18	USSF	Low earth	Military satellite		
2027 (TBD)	(Germany) Spectrum		(Norway) Andøya		(Germany) Isar Aerospace	
2027 (TBD)	(United Kingdom) ADRAS-J2	Astroscale UK	Low Earth	Space Debris Removal		
2027 (TBD)	(France) Ariane 64		(France) Kourou ELA-4		(France) Arianespace	
2027 (TBD)	(United States) OneWeb	Eutelsat	Low earth (Polar orbit)	Communications satellite		
2027 (TBD)	(Japan) H3		(Japan) Tanegashima LA-Y2		(Japan) MHI	
2027 (TBD)	TBA	TBA	Low Earth orbit	TBA		
2027 (TBD)	Rideshare mission					
2027 (TBD)	(Japan) H3		(Japan) Tanegashima LA-Y2		(Japan) MHI	
2027 (TBD)	(Japan) IGS-Optical 9	CSICE	Low Earth (SSO)	Reconnaissance		
2027 (TBD)	(United States) Falcon 9		(United States) Cape Canaveral SLC-40		(United States) SpaceX	
2027 (TBD)	(United States) Crew-15	NASA	Low Earth orbit (ISS)	ISS Crew Transport		
2027 (TBD)	(Germany) Spectrum		(Norway) Andøya		(Germany) Isar Aerospace	
2027 (TBD)	(United Kingdom) ELS-R 1	ElevationSpace	Low Earth	Technology demonstration		
2027 (TBD)	(United States) Falcon 9 Block 5		(United States) Cape Canaveral SLC-40		(United States) SpaceX	
2027 (TBD)	(United States) CAPSTONE 02	NASA	Trans-lunar injection	Technology demonstration		

- ← Jan
- Feb
- Mar
- Apr
- May
- Jun
- Jul
- Aug
- Sep
- Oct
- Nov
- Dec →

== Suborbital flights ==
Date and time (UTC)	Rocket	Flight number	Launch site		LSP	
Date and time (UTC)	Payload (⚀ = CubeSat)	Operator	Orbit	Function	Decay (UTC)	Outcome
Date and time (UTC)	Remarks					
20 March	(Canada) Black Brant XIIA		(Norway) Andøya		(United States) NASA	
20 March	(United States) Resolute	Goddard Space Flight Center	Suborbital	Geospace science		
20 March	First of two launches					
20 March	(Canada) Black Brant XIIA		(Norway) Andøya		(United States) NASA	
20 March	(United States) Resolute	Goddard Space Flight Center	Suborbital	Geospace science		
20 March	Second of two launches					
March (TBD)	(United States) Improved Orion		(Sweden) Esrange		(Germany) MORABA / (Sweden) SNSA	
March (TBD)	(Germany) (Sweden) REXUS-37	DLR / SNSA	Suborbital	Education		
March (TBD)	(United States) Improved Orion		(Sweden) Esrange		(Germany) MORABA / (Sweden) SNSA	
March (TBD)	(Germany) (Sweden) REXUS-38	DLR / SNSA	Suborbital	Education		
24 June	(Canada) Black Brant IX		(United States) Wallops Flight Facility		(United States) NASA	
24 June	(United States) REDSoX	MIT	Suborbital	X-ray astronomy		
24 June	Rocket Experiment Demonstration of a Soft X-ray Polarimeter (REDSoX) mission.					
October (TBD)	(Brazil) VSB-30	S1X-7/M19	(Sweden) Esrange		(Sweden) SSC	
October (TBD)	(Sweden) MASER-19	SSC	Suborbital	Microgravity research		
October (TBD)	SubOrbital Express Microgravity flight opportunity 7.					
October (TBD)	(Germany) Red Kite/Impr. Malemute		(Sweden) Esrange		(Germany) MORABA	
October (TBD)	(Germany) MAPHEUS-18	DLR	Suborbital	Microgravity research		
November (TBD)	(Brazil) VSB-30		(Sweden) Esrange		(Germany) MORABA	
November (TBD)	(Germany) TEXUS-64	DLR / ESA	Suborbital	Microgravity research		

== Deep-space rendezvous ==
Date (UTC)	Spacecraft	Event	Remarks
17 March	OSIRIS-APEX	Gravity assist at Earth	Target altitude 4146 km
24 April	Tianwen-2	Departure from 469219 Kamoʻoalewa	
25 April	Juno	94th perijove	On the day of this perijove, Juno will make a close fly of Amalthea
12 August	Lucy	Flyby of asteroid 3548 Eurybates	Target altitude 1000 km
15 September	Lucy	Flyby of asteroid 15094 Polymele	Target altitude 415 km
7 November	Juno	100th perijove	On the day of this perijove, Juno will fly by Thebe at a distance of 21,155 km.
29 November	Tianwen-2 sample return capsule	Asteroid (469219 Kamoʻoalewa) sample return	Will continue mission to visit 311P/PanSTARRS via gravity assist after dropping off sample capsule .
December	Hayabusa2	Flyby of Earth	Gravity assist

== Extravehicular activities (EVAs) ==
Start date/time	Duration	End time	Spacecraft	Crew	Remarks

== Orbital launch statistics ==
=== By country ===
For the purposes of this section, the yearly tally of orbital launches by country assigns each flight to the country of origin of the rocket, not to the launch services provider or the spaceport. For example, Soyuz launches by Arianespace in Kourou are counted under Russia because Soyuz-2 is a Russian rocket.

Country	Launches	Successes	Failures	Partial failures
World	0	0	0	0

=== By rocket ===
==== By family ====
Family	Country	Launches	Successes	Failures	Partial failures	Remarks

==== By type ====
Rocket	Country	Family	Launches	Successes	Failures	Partial failures	Remarks

==== By configuration ====
Rocket	Country	Type	Launches	Successes	Failures	Partial failures	Remarks

=== By spaceport ===
Site	Country	Launches	Successes	Failures	Partial failures	Remarks

=== By orbit ===
Orbital regime	Launches	Achieved	Not achieved	Accidentally achieved	Remarks
Transatmospheric	0	0	0	0	
Low Earth	0	0	0	0	
Geosynchronous / transfer	0	0	0	0	
Medium Earth	0	0	0	0	
High Earth	0	0	0	0	
Heliocentric orbit	0	0	0	0	Including planetary transfer orbits

== Expected maiden flights ==
Rocket	Origin	Organization	Reusable	Launch	Outcome	Ref.
Agnibaan	India	AgniKul Cosmos	First stage	Q1	TBD	
Nova	USA	Stoke Space	Fully	Q1	TBD	
Pallas-2	China	Galactic Energy	First stage	Early 2027	TBD	
Miura 5	Spain	PLD Space	First stage	H1	TBD	
Daytona I	USA	Phantom Space	—N/a	H2	TBD	
Antares 330	USA	Northrop Grumman	—N/a	2027	TBD	
Skyrora XL	UK	Skyrora	—N/a	2027	TBD	
Maia	France	MaiaSpace (ArianeGroup)	First stage	2027	TBD	
Eclipse	USA	Firefly Aerospace	First stage	2027	TBD	
Long March 10	China	CALT		2027	TBD	
Vega-E	EU	Avio	—N/a	2027	TBD	
Daytona II	USA	Phantom Space	—N/a	2027	TBD	
Angara A5M	Russia	Khrunichev	—N/a	2027	TBD	
ŞİMŞEK-1	Turkey	Roketsan	—N/a	2027	TBD	
SL1	Germany	HyImpulse	—N/a	2027	TBD	
Zero	Japan	Interstellar Technologies	—N/a	2027	TBD	
Zephyr	France	Latitude	—N/a	2027	TBD	
Neutron	USA	Rocket Lab	First stage	2027	TBD	
Microlançador Brasileiro	Brazil	Brazilian Space Agency	—N/a	2027	TBD	
RFA One	Germany	Rocket Factory Augsburg	First stage	2027	TBD	
Epsilon S	Japan	JAXA	—N/a	2027	TBD	
