= Tianlian =

Tracking and Data Relay Satellite System

- Manufacturer: China Academy of Space Technology (CAST)
- Country of origin: China
- Operator: China Aerospace Science and Technology Corporation (CASC)
- Applications: Tracking and Data Relay Satellite System

Specifications
- Bus: DFH-3 - first generation; DFH-4 - second generation; DFH-4E - third generation
- Regime: Geostationary

Production
- Status: In service
- Launched: 12
- Operational: 9
- Retired: 3
- Maiden launch: Tianlian I-01; 25 April 2008
- Last launch: Tianlian III-01; 29 July 2026

Tianlian (Simplified Chinese: 天链, Traditional Chinese: 天鏈, English: Sky Link) also known as CTDRS, is a Chinese data relay communication satellite constellation. The constellation serves to relay data from ground stations to spacecraft and rockets, most significantly China's crewed spaceflight program. The system currently consists of twelve satellites of three generations, with the first satellite being launched in 2008.

== Mission ==
Tianlian is used to provide real-time communications between orbiting satellites and ground control stations. The Chinese tracking and data relay satellites were developed by the China Academy of Space Technology (CAST) and it is similar to the American Tracking and Data Relay Satellite System (TDRSS) in concept. The system is designed to support near-real-time communications between orbiting spacecraft and ground control, as well as complement the ground-based space tracking and telemetry stations and ships in tracking spacecraft. This is necessary because ground stations can only maintain contact with a satellite while it is overhead. Positioning multiple satellites in geostationary orbit ensures that the ground station and satellite are both always in view of at least one relay satellite, allowing for constant communication between the ground station and target satellite. The system provides data relay services for crewed Shenzhou missions, from Shenzhou 7 onwards, the Tiangong space station, and interplanetary missions. All satellites were launched from the Xichang Satellite Launch Center and operate in geostationary orbit.

== Tianlian I ==
Tianlian I consists of five satellites, all based on the DFH-3 satellite bus. The first satellite of the series, Tianlian I-01, was launched on the maiden flight of the Long March 3C launch vehicle on 25 April 2008. With the launch of Tianlian I-03, a spacecraft could be tracked for 70% of its orbit, compared to only 15% without the constellation.

== Tianlian II ==
Tianlian II is the second generation of the constellation and currently consists of 6 satellites based on the DFH-4 satellite bus. The second generation system greatly improves data transmission rates and its multi-targeting ability. This in turn improves spacecraft operational safety and flexibility.

== Tianlian III ==
Tianlian III is the third generation of the constellation and launched its first satellite on 29 July 2026 from the Wenchang Space Launch Site with the Long March 7A rocket. It is based on the enhanced platform of DFH-4 satellite bus, DFH-4E which provides further improvements to the satellite platform's carrying capacity. Equipped with a new generation of payload products, the satellite's multi-user parallel data transmission capability has been significantly enhanced.

== Satellites ==
Satellite	Simplified Chinese Name	Launch (UTC)	Carrier Rocket	Launch site	Bus	Longitude	Status	COSPAR ID	SATCAT no.
First Generation
Tianlian I-01	天链一号01星	25 April 2008, 15:35	Long March 3C	XSLC LC-2	DFH-3	77.0° East	Inactive	2008-019A	32779
Tianlian I-02	天链一号02星	11 July 2011, 15:41	Long March 3C	XSLC LC-2	DFH-3	176.72° East	Inactive	2011-032A	37737
Tianlian I-03	天链一号03星	25 July 2012, 15:43	Long March 3C	XSLC LC-2	DFH-3	16.86° East	Inactive	2012-040A	38730
Tianlian I-04	天链一号04星	22 November 2016, 15:24	Long March 3C	XSLC LC-2	DFH-3	76.95° East	Active	2016-072A	41869
Tianlian I-05	天链一号05星	6 July 2021, 15:53	Long March 3C	XSLC LC-2	DFH-3	106.2653° East	Active	2021-063A	49011
Second Generation
Tianlian II-01	天链二号01星	31 March 2019, 15:51	Long March 3B	XSLC LC-2	DFH-4	79.9° East	Active	2019-017A	44076
Tianlian II-02	天链二号02星	13 December 2021, 16:09	Long March 3B	XSLC LC-3	DFH-4	171.04° East	Active	2021-124A	50005
Tianlian II-03	天链二号03星	12 July 2022, 16:30	Long March 3B	XSLC LC-2	DFH-4	10.5° East	Active	2022-078A	53100
Tianlian II-04	天链二号04星	26 March 2025, 15:55	Long March 3B	XSLC LC-2	DFH-4	80.0° East	Active	2025-062A	63361
Tianlian II-05	天链二号05星	27 April 2025, 15:54	Long March 3B	XSLC LC-2	DFH-4		Active	2025-084A	63662
Tianlian II-06	天链二号06星	23 July 2026, 12:00	Long March 3B	XSLC LC-2	DFH-4		Active	2026-168A	100140
Third Generation
Tianlian III-01	天链三号01星	29 July 2026, 11:50	Long March 7A	WSLS LC-201	DFH-4E		Active	2026-172A	100172

== See also ==
- Queqiao - Chinese Data Relay satellite for lunar communication
- Chinese Deep Space Network - Mission control for deep space missions
- Tracking and Data Relay Satellite System - US equivalent
- Luch - Russian equivalent
- Indian Data Relay Satellite System - Indian equivalent
- European Data Relay System - ESA equivalent
- Inter-satellite service
- Shenzhou spacecraft
