= Inter-satellite service =

Radiocommunication between artificial satellites

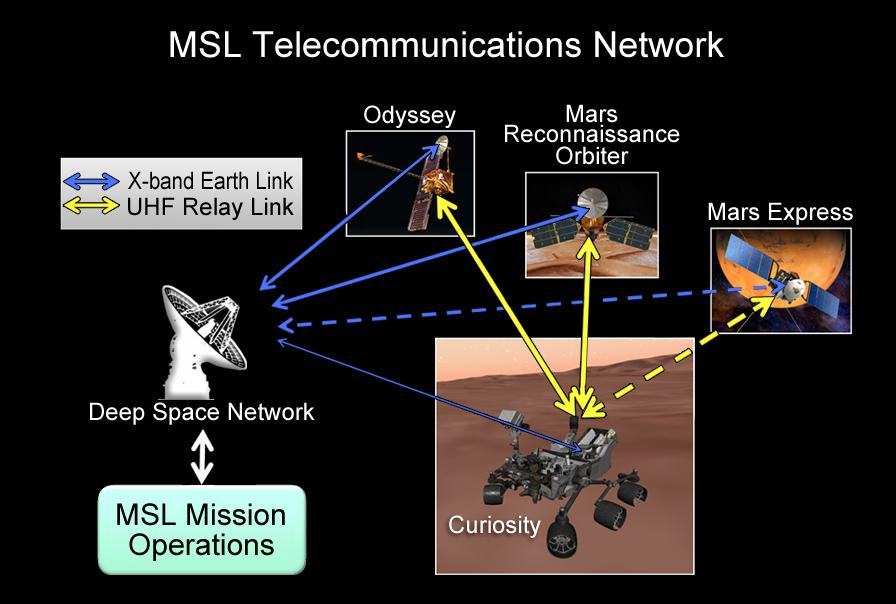
Inter-satellite service to Earth directly or via three relay satellites orbit.

Inter-satellite service, also known as inter-satellite radiocommunication service or inter-satellite link (ISL), as defined by Article 1.22 of the International Telecommunication Union's (ITU) Radio Regulations (RR), is a radiocommunication service providing links between artificial satellites.

== Classification ==
In accordance with ITU Radio Regulations (article 1) variations of this radiocommunication service are classified as follows:

- Fixed service (article 1.20)
  - Fixed-satellite service (article 1.21)
  - Inter-satellite service (article 1.22)
  - Earth exploration-satellite service (article 1.51)
    - Meteorological-satellite service (article 1.52)

== Satellites ==
=== Inter-satellite radiocommunications satellites ===
- U.S. Tracking and Data Relay Satellite
- Artemis (satellite)
- European Data Relay System
- Indian Data Relay Satellite System
- Luch (satellite) (Russia)
- Tianlian I (China)

=== Commercial satellite constellations with inter-satellite communication ===
- Iridium
- Starlink
- Kuiper Systems

== See also ==
- Communications satellite
- Radio station
- Wireless mesh network
- Laser communication in space

== References / sources ==
- International Telecommunication Union (ITU)
- Earth exploration-satellite service. ITU, Genf 2011. ISBN 92-61-13761-X
