= Tracking and Data Relay Satellite System =

Network of American communications satellites

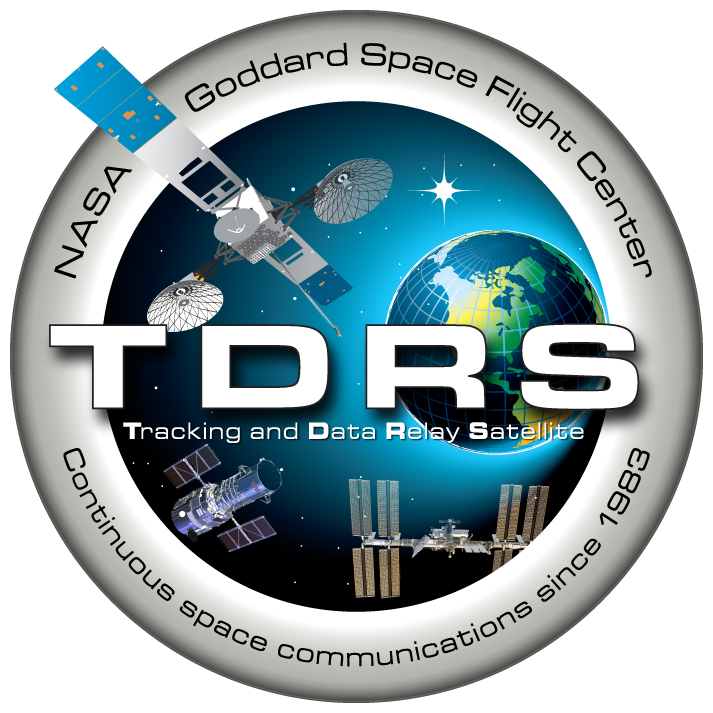
TDRS Program Logo

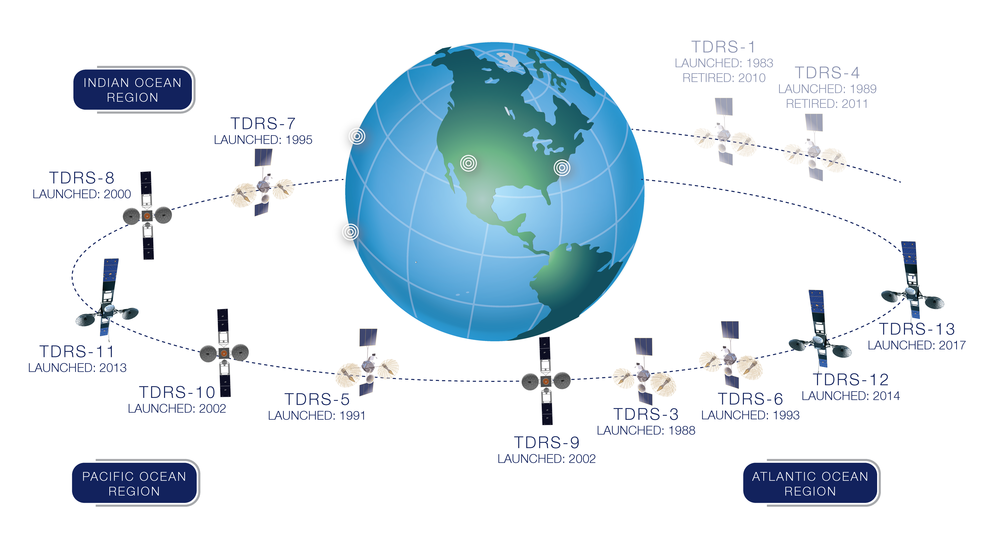
Location of TDRS as of March 2019

An unflown TDRS on display at the Steven F. Udvar-Hazy Center in Chantilly, Virginia.

The U.S. Tracking and Data Relay Satellite System (TDRSS, pronounced "T-driss") is a network of American communications satellites (each called a tracking and data relay satellite, TDRS) and ground stations used by NASA for space communications. The system was designed to replace an existing network of ground stations that had supported all of NASA's crewed flight missions. The prime design goal was to increase the time spacecraft were in communication with the ground and improve the amount of data that could be transferred. Many Tracking and Data Relay Satellites were launched in the 1980s and 1990s with the Space Shuttle and made use of the Inertial Upper Stage, a two-stage solid rocket booster developed for the shuttle. Other TDRS were launched by Atlas IIa and Atlas V rockets.

The most recent generation of satellites provides ground reception rates of 6 Mbit/s in the S-band and 800 Mbit/s in the Ku- and Ka-bands. This is mainly used by the United States military.

In 2022 NASA announced that it would gradually phase out the TDRS system and rely on commercial providers of communication satellite services.

== Origins ==
To satisfy the requirement for long-duration, highly available space-to-ground communications, NASA created the Spacecraft Tracking and Data Acquisition Network (STADAN) in the early 1960s. Consisting of parabolic dish antennas and telephone switching equipment deployed around the world, the STADAN provided space-to-ground communications for approximately 15 minutes of a 90-minute orbit period. This limited contact-period sufficed for uncrewed spacecraft, but crewed spacecraft require a much higher data collection time.

A side-by-side network established right after STADAN in the early 1960s, called the Manned Space Flight Network (MSFN), interacted with crewed spacecraft in Earth orbit. Another network, the Deep Space Network (DSN), interacted with crewed spacecraft higher than 10,000 miles from Earth, such as the Apollo missions, in addition to its primary mission of data collection from deep space probes.

With the creation of the Space Shuttle in the mid-1970s, a requirement for a higher performance space-based communication system arose. At the end of the Apollo program, NASA realized that MSFN and STADAN had evolved to have similar capabilities and decided to merge the two networks to create the Spacecraft Tracking and Data Network (STDN).

Even after consolidation, STDN had some drawbacks. Since the entire network consisted of ground stations spread around the globe, these sites were vulnerable to the political whims of the host country. In order to maintain a high-reliability rate coupled with higher data transfer speeds, NASA began a study to augment the system with space-based communication nodes.

The space segment of the new system would rely upon satellites in geostationary orbit. These satellites, by virtue of their position, could transmit and receive data to lower orbiting satellites and still stay within sight of the ground station. The operational TDRSS constellation would use two satellites, designated TDE and TDW (for east and west), and one on-orbit spare.

After the study was completed, NASA realized that a minor system modification was needed to achieve 100% global coverage. A small area would not be within line-of-sight of any satellites – a so-called Zone of Exclusion (ZOE). With the ZOE, neither TDRS satellite could contact a spacecraft under a certain altitude (646 nautical miles). With the addition of another satellite to cover the ZOE and ground station nearby, 100% coverage could exist. The space-based network study created a system that became the plan for the present-day TDRSS network design.

As early as the 1960s, NASA's Application Technology Satellite (ATS) and Advanced Communications Technology Satellite (ACTS) programs prototyped many of the technologies used on TDRSS and other commercial communications satellites, including frequency division multiple-access, three-axis spacecraft stabilization and high-performance communications technologies.

As of July 2009, TDRS project manager is Jeff J. Gramling, NASA Goddard Space Flight Center. Robert P. Buchanan, Deputy Project Manager, retired after 41 years at NASA with TDRS as one of his final missions. Boeing is responsible for the construction of TDRS K.

== The network ==
TDRSS is similar to most other space systems, whereby it is composed of three segments: the ground, space and user segments. These three segments work in conjunction to accomplish the mission. An emergency or failure in any one segment could have catastrophic impact on the rest of the system. For this reason all segments have redundancy factored in.

== Ground segment ==
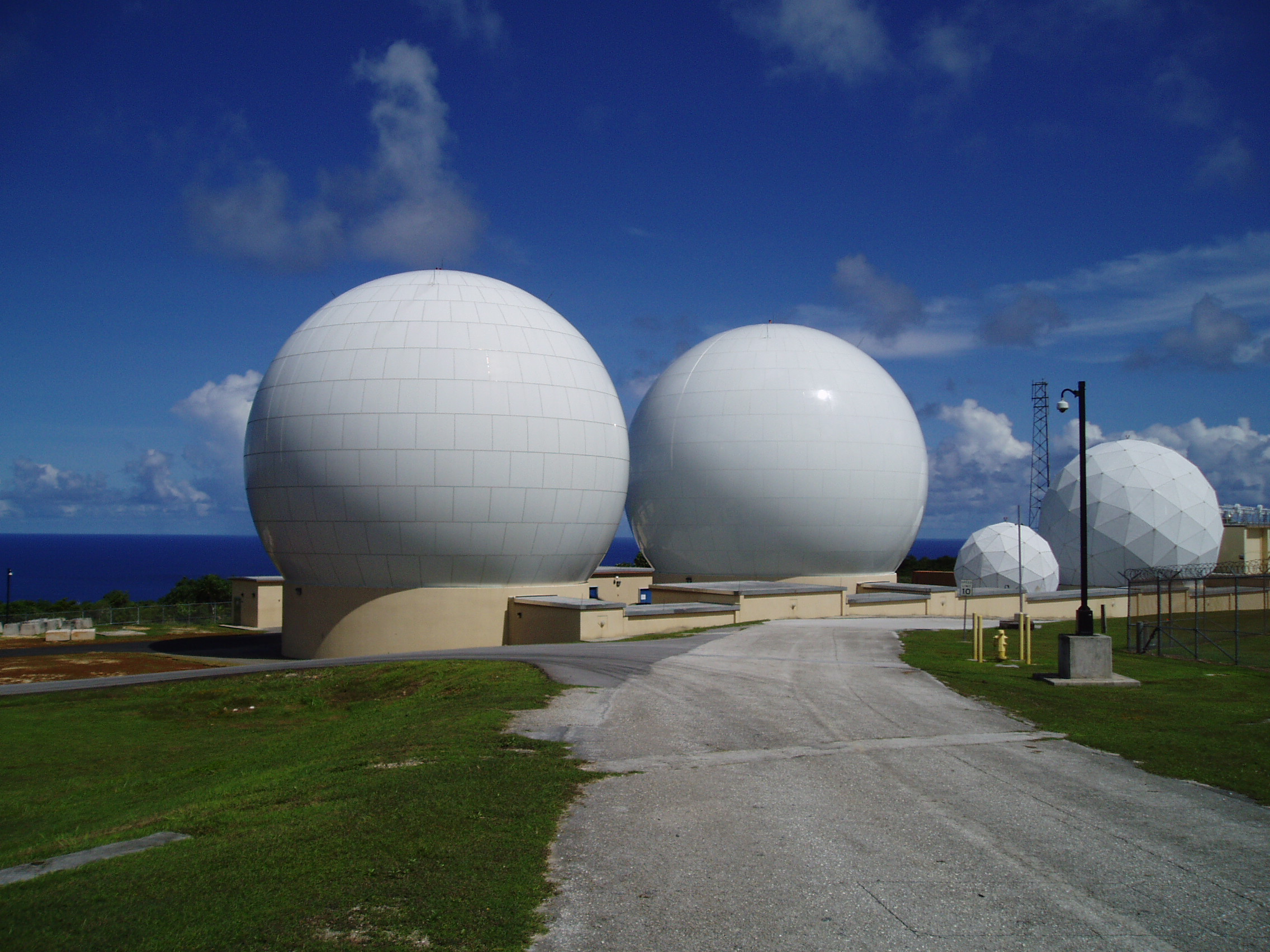
Guam Remote Ground Terminal

The ground segment of TDRSS consists of three ground stations located at the White Sands Complex (WSC) in southern New Mexico, the Guam Remote Ground Terminal (GRGT) at Naval Computer and Telecommunications Station Guam, and Network Control Center located at Goddard Space Flight Center in Greenbelt, Maryland. These three stations are the heart of the network, providing command & control services. Under a system upgrade that has been completed, a new terminal has been built at Blossom Point, Maryland.

WSC, located near Las Cruces consists of:

- White Sands Ground Terminal (WSGT) 32.5007°N 106.6086°W
- Second TDRSS Ground Terminal (STGT) 32.5430°N 106.6120°W
- Extended TDRS Ground Terminal

Additionally, the WSC remotely controls the GRGT on Guam.

The WSC has its own exit from U.S. Route 70 that is for facility staff only. NASA decided on the location of the ground terminals using very specific criteria. Foremost was the ground station's view of the satellites; the location had to be close enough to the equator to view the skies, both east and west. Weather was another important factor – New Mexico has, on average, almost 350 days of sunshine per year, with a very low precipitation level.

WSGT went online with the 1983 launch of TDRS-A by the Space Shuttle Challenger. STGT became operational in 1994, completing the system after Flight-6's on-orbit checkout earlier in the year. Additionally, after completion of the second terminal, NASA held a contest to name the two stations. Local middle school students chose Cacique (kah-see-keh), meaning leader for WSGT, and Danzante meaning dancer for STGT. These names seem to have been for publicity purposes only, for official NASA documentation use WSGT and STGT or WSC as designators.

WSGT and STGT are geographically separated and completely independent of one another, while retaining a backup fiber-optic link to transfer data between sites in case of emergency. Each ground station has 19-meter dishes, known as Space-Ground Link Terminals (SGLT), to communicate with the satellites. Three SGLTs are located at STGT, but only two are located at WSGT. The system architects moved the remaining SGLT to Guam to provide full network support for the satellite covering the ZOE. Considered a remote part of the WSGT, the distance and location of the SGLT is transparent to network users.

The Guam Remote Ground Terminal (GRGT) 13.6148°N 144.8565°E is an extension of the WSGT. The terminal contains SGLT 6, with the Communication Service Controller (CSC) located at STGT's TDRS Operations Control Center. Before the GRGT was operational, an auxiliary system was located at Diego Garcia.

=== Incorporation into the STDN ===
The major parts of the Space Flight Tracking and Data Network (STDN) are: the NASA Integrated Services Network (NISN), network control center (NCC), mission operations center (MOC), spacecraft data processing facility, and the multi mission flight dynamics lab (MMFD).

NISN provides the data transfer backbone for space missions. It is a cost-effect wide area network telecommunications service for transmission of data, video, and voice for all NASA enterprises, programs and centers. This part of the STDN consists of infrastructure and computers dedicated to monitor network traffic flow, such as fiber optic links, routers and switches. Data can flow through NISN two ways: using the Internet Protocol Operational Network (IPONET) or the High Data Rate System (HDRS). IPONET uses the TCP/IP protocol common to all computers connected to the Internet, and is a standard way to ship data. The High Data Rate System transports data rates from 2 Mbit/s to 48 Mbit/s, for specialized missions requiring a high rate of data transfer. HDRS does not require the infrastructure of routers, switches and gateways to send its data forward like IPONET.

The NCC provides service planning, control, assurance and accountability. Service planning takes user requests and disseminates the information to the appropriate space network elements. Service control and assurance supports functions of real-time usage, such as receipt, validation, display and dissemination of TDRSS performance data. Service accountability provides accounting reports on the use of the NCC and network resources. The NCC was originally located at Goddard Space-flight Center, in Greenbelt, Maryland until 2000, when it was relocated to the WSC.

The MOC is the focal point of spacecraft operations. It will schedule requests for support, monitor spacecraft performance and upload control information to the spacecraft (through TDRSS). MOC consists of principal investigators, mission planners and flight operators. Principal investigators initiate requests for space network support. Mission planners provide documentation for the spacecraft and its mission. And flight operators are the final link, sending commands to the spacecraft and performing the operations.

The MMFD lab provides flight project and tracking network support. Flight project support consists of orbital and attitude determination and control. Orbital parameters are traced through the actual orbit of the mission spacecraft and compared to its predicted orbit. Attitude determination computes sets of parameters that describe a spacecraft's orientation relative to known objects (Sun, Moon, stars or Earth's magnetic field). Tracking network support analyzes and evaluates the quality of the tracking data.

== Space segment ==
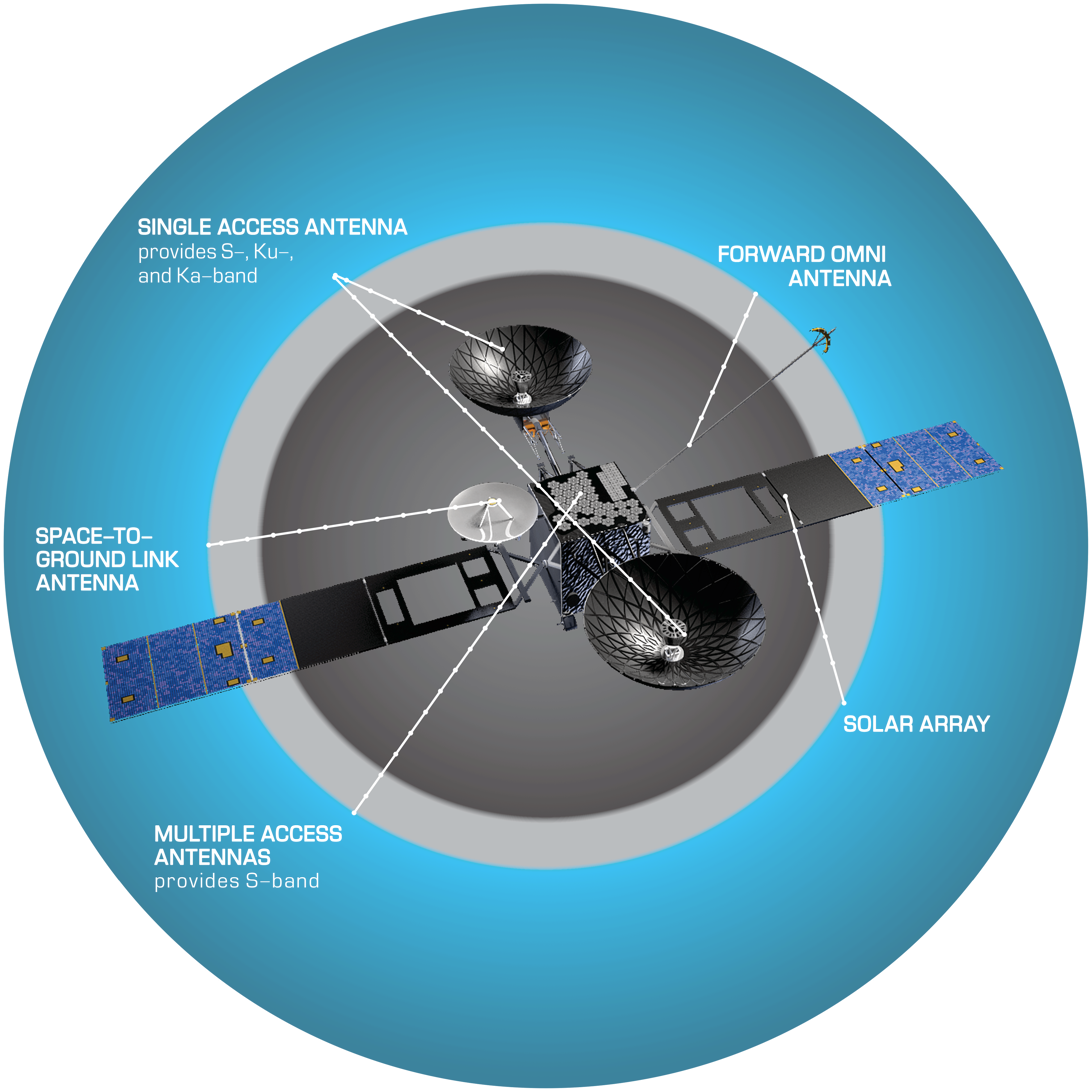
TDRSS satellite

The space segment of the TDRSS constellation is the most dynamic part of the system. Even with nine satellites on orbit, the system provides support with three primary satellites, while using the rest as on-orbit spares capable of immediate usage as primaries. The original TDRSS design had two primary satellites, designated TDE, for east, and TDW, for west and one on-orbit spare. The surge in user requirements during the 1980s allowed NASA to expand the network with the addition of more satellites, with some being co-located in a particularly busy orbital slot. See Tracking and Data Relay Satellite for more details on the satellites.

== User segment ==
The user segment of TDRSS includes many of NASA's most prominent programs. Programs such as the Hubble Space Telescope and LANDSAT relay their observations to their respective mission control centers through TDRSS. Since crewed space flight was one of the primary reasons for building TDRSS, the space shuttle and International Space Station voice communications are routed through the system.

== Operations ==
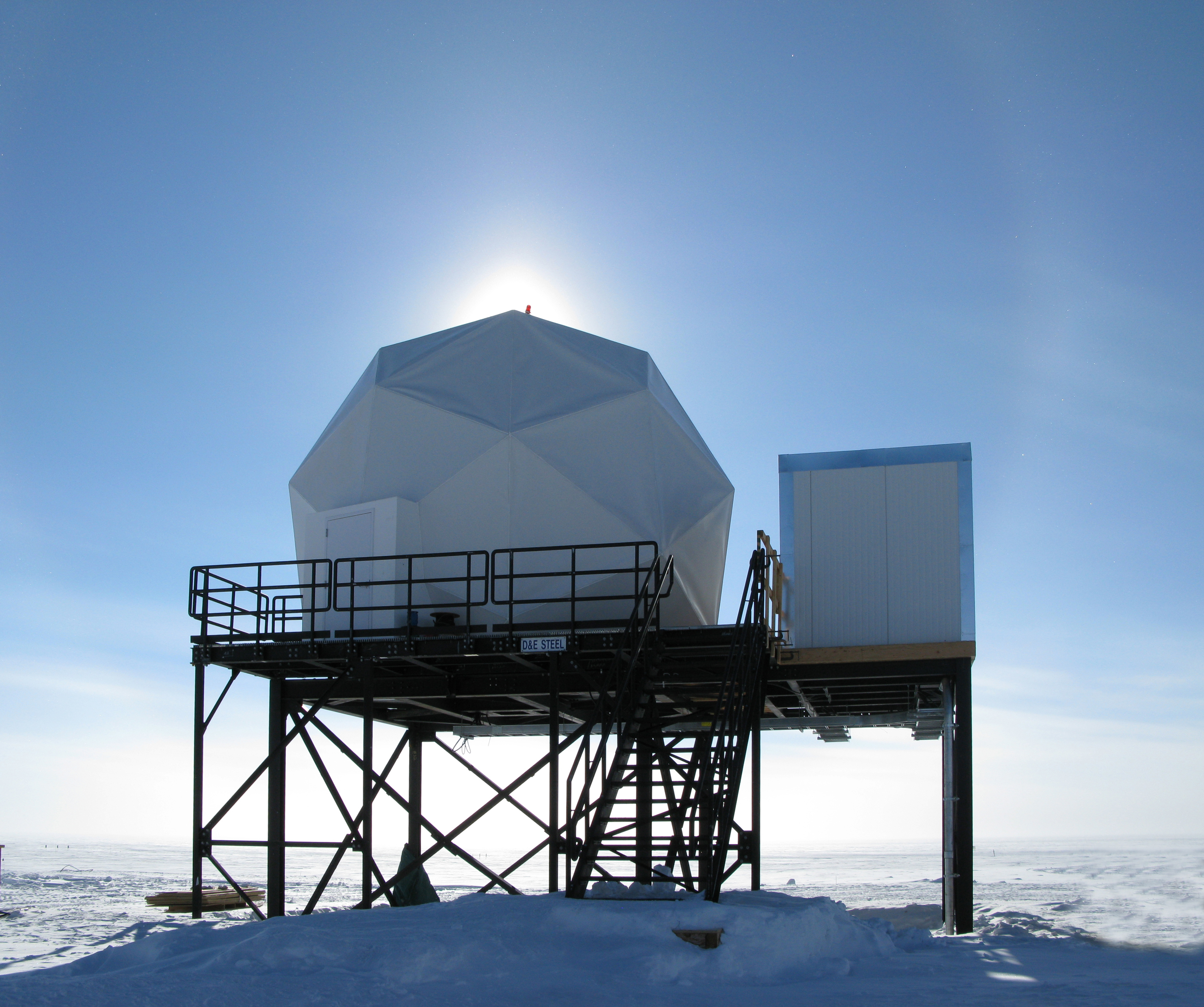
South Pole Tracking Relay-2

The TDRSS system has been used to provide data relay services to many orbiting observatories, and also to Antarctic facilities such as McMurdo Station by way of the TDRSS South Pole Relay. The US-built sections of the International Space Station (ISS) use TDRSS for data relay. TDRSS is also used to provide launch data relay for expendable boosters.

== Military applications ==
As early as 1989, it was reported that an important function of TDRSS was to provide data relay for the Lacrosse radar imaging reconnaissance satellites operated by the National Reconnaissance Office.

Almost twenty years later, on November 23, 2007, an on-line trade publication noted, "While NASA uses the (TDRSS) satellites to communicate with the space shuttle and international space station, most of their bandwidth is devoted to the Pentagon, which covers the lion's share of TDRSS operations costs and is driving many of the system's requirements, some of them classified."

In October 2008, the NRO declassified the existence of mission ground stations in the US called Aerospace Data Facility (ADF)- Colorado, ADF-East and ADF-Southwest near Denver, Colorado, Washington, D.C., and Las Cruces, New Mexico, respectively. ADF-Colorado and ADF-East are known to be located at Buckley AFB, CO and Fort Belvoir, Virginia; ADF-Southwest is located at White Sands Missile Range, assumed to be at the White Sands TDRSS station.

== Production ==
The first seven TDRSS satellites were built by the TRW corporation (now part of Northrop Grumman Aerospace Systems) in Redondo Beach, California, and all of the satellites since then by Hughes Space and Communications, Inc., in El Segundo, California, (now a part of the Boeing corporation).

== Cultural references ==
The TDRSS system is briefly mentioned in the James Bond movie, Moonraker. It is also brought up in the 1997 movie Event Horizon.

== Launch history ==
Note: while a TDRSS satellite is in the manufacturing process it is given a letter designation, but once it has successfully achieved the correct geosynchronous orbit it is referred to with a number (for example, TDRS-A during development and before on-orbit acceptance, and TDRS-1 after acceptance on orbit and put into operational use). Thus, satellites that are lost in launch failures or have massive malfunctions are never numbered (for example, TDRS-B, which was never numbered due to its loss in the Space Shuttle Challenger disaster).

== See also ==
- European Data Relay System
- Indian Data Relay Satellite System – Planned communications satellites
- Luch (satellite) – Russian data relay system
- Satellite Data System – Another US data relay system for reconnaissance satellites
- Tianlian – Chinese data relay system

== Notes ==
- Baker, D. (Ed.) (2001) Jane's Space Directory: 2001–2002. Alexandria, Virginia: Jane's Information Group.
- Consolidated Space Operations Contract (CSOC). (2000) Certification & Training Course 880 & 882: TDRSS Orientation & System Data Flow.
- Kraft, C. (2002) Flight: My Life in Mission Control. New York: Plume Books.
- Kranz, G. (2000) Failure is Not an Option. New York: Plume Books
- NASA. (1996) 2nd TDRSS Workshop: 25–26 Jun 1996. Retrieved from Internet 25 Aug 2003. https://web.archive.org/web/20050126202052/http://nmsp.gsfc.nasa.gov/TUBE/pdf/infopack.pdf
- Tracking Fox GPS Tracker. https://certifiedpedia.com/tracking-fox-gps-tracker-review/
- NASA. (2000) Guam Remote Ground Terminal. Retrieved from Internet 25 Aug 2003. https://web.archive.org/web/20050214060604/http://nmsp.gsfc.nasa.gov/tdrss/guam.html
- Sellers, J. (2000) Understanding Space: An Introduction to Astronautics. New York: McGraw-Hill Companies, Inc.
- Thompson, T. (1996) TRW Space Log. Redondo Beach, California: TRW Space & Electronics Group.
- Wertz, J. & Larson, W. (1999) Space Mission Analysis and Design, Third Edition. Torrance, California: Microcosm Press.
