= Serdar Hüseyin Yıldırım =

Turkish politician

Administrator of Turkish Space Agency
- In office 6 August 2019 – 7 October 2023
- President: Recep Tayyip Erdoğan
- Preceded by: Office established
- Succeeded by: Yusuf Kıraç

Personal details
- Born: 1961 (age 64–65) Üsküdar, Istanbul

Serdar Hüseyin Yıldırım (born 1961) is a Turkish politician and engineer. He was appointed on 6 August 2019 as the first administrator of the Turkish Space Agency.

== Early life and education ==
Serdar Hüseyin Yıldırım was born in the year 1961 in Üsküdar, Istanbul. He is originally from Rize.

He graduated from Kadıköy Anatolian High School and studied in ITU Aeronautical Engineering department.

He was transferred to Technische Universität Berlin in 1980, Yıldırım graduated from the Faculty of Transportation Sciences, Department of Aviation and Space Sciences.

Having entered the aviation industry in 1989, Yıldırım went abroad after working for 12 years in various airlines and worked as a project consultant in various countries. Yıldırım also taught 'Airline Management' for five years at Kadir Has University.
