= Turkish Space Agency =

National space agency of Turkey

- Türkiye Uzay Ajansı

Agency overview
- Abbreviation: TUA
- Formed: 13 December 2018; 7 years ago
- Type: Space agency
- Headquarters: Ankara, Turkey
- Administrator: Yusuf Kıraç
- Owner: Ministry of Industry and Technology
- Annual budget: ₺24.6 billion (2027)
- Website: tua.gov.tr/en

The Turkish Space Agency (Turkish: Türkiye Uzay Ajansı, TUA) is a government agency for national aerospace research as a part of the space program of Turkey. It was formally established by a presidential decree on 13 December 2018.

Headquartered in Ankara, the agency is subordinated to the Ministry of Industry and Technology. With the establishment of TUA, the Department for Aviation and Space Technologies at the Ministry of Transportation and Infrastructure was abolished. TUA prepares strategic plans that include medium and long-term goals, basic principles and approaches, objectives and priorities, performance measures, methods to be followed and resource allocation for aerospace science and technologies.

TUA works in close collaboration with the TÜBİTAK Space Technologies Research Institute (TÜBİTAK UZAY). It is administrated by an executive board of seven members. The tenure of board members, the chairperson excluded, is three years.

Internationally, TUA currently has agreements with Ukraine, Hungary and Kazakhstan's space programs, and conducts extensive nation-wide assessments regarding membership to ESA since 2020 as part of Turkey's cooperation agreement with the agency in 2004. It is a member of the Asia-Pacific Space Cooperation Organization (APSCO).

== Notable missions ==
=== Past and present ===
- Türksat 6A (Communication satellite, 2024)
- BILSAT-1 (Earth observation, 2003)
- RASAT (Earth observation, 2011)
- Gokturk 1 & 2 (Earth observation, 2011)

=== Future ===
- AYAP-1 (Lunar impactor, 2027)
- AYAP-2 (Moon lander, Early 2030s)

== List of TSA astronauts ==
Name	Selection	Time in space	Missions
Alper Gezeravcı	2023	21 days, 15 hours and 41 minutes	Axiom Mission 3
Tuva Cihangir Atasever	2023	15 Minutes	Galactic 07

== Administrators ==
No.	Head	Took office	Left office
1	Serdar Hüseyin Yıldırım	6 August 2019	7 October 2023
2	Yusuf Kıraç	7 October 2023	Incumbent

== See also ==
- List of government space agencies
- Science and technology in Turkey
- Turkish Space Systems, Integration and Test Center
- Space Launch System (Turkey)
- Space Camp Turkey
- Turkish Aerospace Industries
