= Latitude (company) =

French rocket manufacturing company

Logo of Latitude

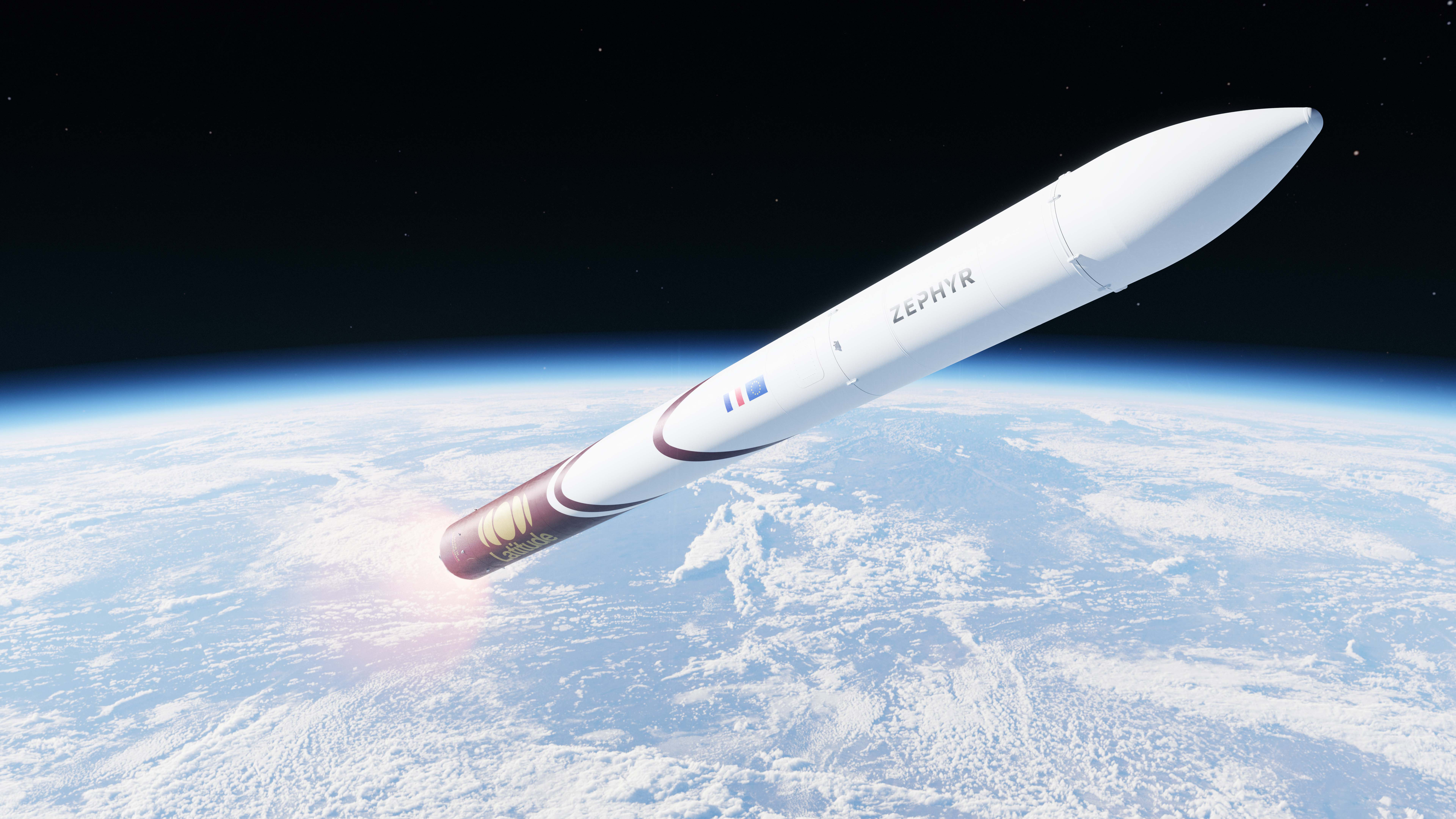
Rendering of the Zephyr rocket

Latitude (formerly Venture Orbital Systems) is a French start-up based in Reims. It is developing the Zephyr Launcher and its 3D-printed engine, Navier, to offer orbital launch services tailored to small satellites.

== Zephyr Launcher ==
The first variant of the Zephyr rocket will be capable of delivering 100 kg to Low Earth orbit (LEO). A second variant, expected in 2028, will carry up to 200 kg to LEO. The performance increase will primarily be achieved by engine upgrades.

== Timeline ==
The company was founded in 2020 and is located in Reims. It inaugurated its micro-launcher factory in Reims on 19 October 2021. In June 2022, it had closed a €10 million Series A funding round and, in spring 2023, signed a lease with the Département of Marne to establish its test center on the former NATO base at XCR Airport, 150 km east of Paris. The Titan research, development, and testing center covers an 8-hectare site and officially became Latitude’s main test facility.

In early 2023, initial testing of the Navier engine prototype began in northern Scotland with a successful hot fire.

In January 2024, the company has raised $30 million for producing its rockets. In June 2024, Latitude has been awarded €15 million by the French government. In 2025, the company has committed €8 million to developing its section of a new commercial launch facility at the Guiana Space Centre in French Guiana and signed a deal to expand into a larger factory. Latitude plans inaugural flight in 2027.
