= Indian Data Relay Satellite System =

Planned communications satellites

- Manufacturer: ISRO
- Country of origin: India
- Operator: ISRO
- Applications: Data transmission

Specifications
- Bus: I-2K
- Launch mass: Less than 3,000 kilograms (6,600 lb)
- Regime: Geostationary

Production
- Status: Planned
- Maiden launch: IDRSS-1; 2025-26 (planned)

Indian Data Relay Satellite System or IDRSS is a planned Indian constellation of Inter-satellite communications satellites. It is planned to initially comprise two satellites, CMS-04 (formerly IDRSS-1) & IDRSS-2 in geostationary orbit. It will facilitate relay of information between various Indian spacecraft, in-flight launch vehicle monitoring and assist the Indian Human Spaceflight Programme.

== Objectives ==
A Data Relay Satellite System (DRSS) facilitates continuous real-time communication between Low Earth orbit bound spacecraft to the ground station as well as inter-satellite communication. Such a satellite in geostationary orbit can track a low altitude spacecraft up to almost half of its orbit.

India operates one of world's largest remote sensing satellites systems. Visibility of these satellites is not more than 10–15 minutes in a day and sometimes even lower. The IDRSS satellites, one opposite to each half of earth in GEO, can see about 80 per cent of the area where Indian remote sensing satellites are orbiting, hence enhancing visibility range and data transfer rates of satellites. IDRSS can also monitor a launch vehicle from the time it lifts off from the launch pad. Satellites will hereby also reduce dependency on ground stations. Implementation of the system will be essential for tracking Gaganyaan, India's future crewed spacecraft.

The main objectives of IDRSS are:

- TTC, Data, Audio and Video links to Gaganyaan
- TTC links to LEO satellite
- Data transfer from Antarctica Ground Stations

== Design ==
IDRSS satellites would be based on 2,000 kg class, I-2K extended bus and will be compatible for launch onboard GSLV Mk-II Launch Vehicle.

=== Payload ===
- Data relay payloads operating in S, Ka and Ku bands.
- 2.5 m deployable Cassegrain antenna System operating in dual frequency bands (S and Ka bands)
- 1.5 m fixed Cassegrain Antenna System operating in Ku and Ka frequency bands.

The deployable antenna system will interface with the satellite by means of a deployable, pointing and tracking mechanism along with a S band rotary joint. Satellites might carry optical communication payload for increased data security and high transfer rates.

== Satellites ==
IDRSS series satellites
Satellite	Int. Sat. ID	NORAD ID	Launch Date	Launch Vehicle	Orbit	Status	Remarks
CMS-04 (IDRSS-1)	TBD	TBD	2025-26	GSLV	GSO	Planned	
IDRSS-2	TBD	TBD	2025-26	GSLV	GSO	Planned	

== Launch ==
IDRSS was approved by the Government of India and had funds allocated in budget of 2019-20. CMS-04 would be the first spacecraft in the IDRSS constellation, and its launch is currently scheduled for 2025-26. IDRSS-2 would have a different orbit in order to facilitate better communication during vehicle ascent and with the ISRO terminal in Cocos islands.

== See also ==
- Tracking and Data Relay Satellite System
- Luch (satellite)
- European Data Relay System
- Tianlian I
