= Cygnus NG-22 =

Cancelled summer 2025 cargo mission to the ISS

NG-22
- Names: CRS NG-22
- Mission type: ISS resupply
- Operator: Northrop Grumman

Spacecraft properties
- Spacecraft type: Enhanced Cygnus
- Manufacturer: Northrop Grumman; Thales Alenia Space

Start of mission
- Launch date: June 2025 (planned)
- Rocket: Falcon 9 Block 5 (planned)
- Launch site: Cape Canaveral (planned)
- Contractor: SpaceX (planned)

End of mission
- Disposal: Pre-flight damage
- Declared: March 5, 2025

Orbital parameters
- Reference system: Geocentric orbit (planned)
- Regime: Low Earth orbit (planned)

Cargo
- Mass: 3,857 kg (8,503 lb) (planned)
- Pressurised: 3,843 kg (8,472 lb) (planned)
- Unpressurised: 14 kg (31 lb) (planned)

Cygnus NG-22 was a cancelled Cygnus resupply mission to the International Space Station. The mission, scheduled for June 2025, had been cancelled on March 5, 2025, due to damage to the Pressurized Service Module during transit from Europe to the space coast.

== Background ==
The Cygnus was developed initially by Orbital Sciences Corporation before the company was ultimately purchased by Northrop Grumman in 2018. The spacecraft consists of two parts, a Service Module (SM) and a Pressurized Cargo Module (PCM), the latter of which is manufactured by Thales Alenia Space in Turin, Italy and has to be shipped to the Space Systems Processing Facility to be mated to the former prior to launch.

== Incident ==
On March 5 NASA issued a statement that it was “assessing potential mission impacts” to NG-22 after its PCM arrived damaged to the Kennedy Space Center. On March 7 Northrop Grumman reported that the freighter carrying NG-22 had been involved in a “commercial shipping accident” damaging both the PCM and its shipping container.

== Aftermath ==
NG-22 was scheduled for launch in June 2025. In order to maintain the ISS' resupply schedule, SpaceX's CRS-32 had its cargo adjusted replacing many science payloads with more food and supplies while the launch of SpaceX CRS-33 and Cygnus NG-23 where accelerated. Additionally, the 'handover' period from the new SpaceX Crew-10 and the departing SpaceX Crew-9 would be shortened to conserve supplies.

In their cancellation announcement NASA stated that they would cooperate with Northrop Grumman's engineers to determine what repairs would be necessary to return NG-22 to service. However, by March 27, Northrop Grumman announced they would be skipping the NG-22 mission entirely to instead fly Cygnus NG-23. It was reported to The Register that NG-22 would be returned to Turin for repairs.

During the pre-launch telecon for NG-23 Northrop Grumman's Vice President Ryan Tintner stated NG-22 would fly once it is repaired but offered no timetable.
