= AYAP-1 =

Turkish planned space mission to the moon

AYAP-1 (Lunar Research Program)
- Mission type: Lunar orbiter and impactor
- Operator: Turkish Space Agency (TUA)
- Mission duration: ~3 months (orbital phase)

Spacecraft properties
- Spacecraft: AYAP-1
- Bus: Indigenous design
- Manufacturer: TÜBİTAK UZAY

Start of mission
- Launch date: 2027 (planned)
- Rocket: Falcon 9 Block 5
- Launch site: Cape Canaveral Space Force Station, SLC‑40

End of mission
- Landing date: 2027 (planned impact)
- Landing site: Lunar surface (Hard landing)

Orbital parameters
- Reference system: Lunar orbit
- Regime: Circular
- Altitude: 100 km (62 mi)

AYAP-1 is a planned space mission by Turkey, being developed by the National Space Program. It will be Turkey's first spacecraft to reach the Moon, entering lunar orbit and concluding with a controlled impact (hard landing) on the lunar surface. The mission is expected to launch in 2027.

== Overview ==
AYAP‑1 is a part of Turkey's Lunar Research Programme (AYAP), an initiative whose goal is to develop Turkey's capabilities in deep‑space missions, lunar exploration, spacecraft systems, and scientific instrumentation. TÜBİTAK UZAY leads the spacecraft's design, development, integration, & testing, working with foreign suppliers like Thales Alenia, the Swedish Institute of Space Physics, for certain subsystems like communications equipment.

== Goals ==
The goals of AYAP-1 are:

- To reach Lunar Orbit and Impact.
- Test Turkey's 1st hybrid propulsion system.
- Collect data about the Moon's water, magnetic activity and radiation.
