= Liquid droplet radiator =

Proposed lightweight radiator

The liquid droplet radiator (LDR), previously termed liquid droplet stream radiator, is a proposed lightweight radiator for the dissipation of waste heat generated by power plants, propulsion or spacecraft systems in space.

== Background ==
An advanced or future space mission must have a power source or propulsion that will require the rejection of waste heat. Disposing large quantities of waste heat must be considered in order to realize a large space structure that handles high power such as a nuclear reactor, space-based data centers or a space solar power satellite (SPS).

mission	power level	duration
Future space station	75–300 kW	30 years
Space-based lasers	1–10 MW	10 years
Particle beam	1 MW	10 years
Space-based radar	30–100 kW	10 years
Lunar base	100–300 kW	30 years
mission to Mars	15 MWe	7 years
mission to Jupiter	63 GW	285 d transit
interstellar (Note: An interstellar starship will require an estimated illumination energy of 12 kilowatts (12,139.7 Watt) per person.) solar sail 5×10^{6} kg	600 kW	1433 years to Alpha Centauri
interstellar antimatter rocket 80.7×10^{9} kg	122,650 TW	128.5 years to 40 LY

Such space systems require advanced high-temperature thermal control systems. Liquid metal heat pipes with conventional radiators are considered ideally suited for such applications. However, the required radiator surface area is huge, hence, the system mass is very large. The liquid droplet radiator (LDR) has an advantage in terms of the rejected heat power-weight ratio. The results of the studies indicate that for rejection temperatures below approximately 700 K, the LDR system is significantly lighter in weight than the other advanced radiator concepts. An LDR can be seven times lighter than conventional heat pipe radiators of similar size. The LDR is more resistant to meteorite impacts due to less critical surface or windage, and requires less storage volume. Therefore, the LDR has attracted attention as an advanced radiator for high-power space systems.

In 1978, John M. Hedgepeth proposed, in "Ultralightweight Structures for Space Power," in Radiation Energy Conversion in Space, Vol. 61 of Progress in Astronautics and Aeronautics, K. W. Billman, ed. (AIAA, New York, 1978), p. 126, the use of a dust radiator to reduce the radiator weight of solar power satellites. Practical problems of this dust system led to the LDR concept in 1979. Numerous studies have been made by companies, organizations and universities around the world.

Practical experiments were carried out for example with STS-77 and at drop shafts in Japan: Japan Microgravity Center (JAMIC) and Microgravity Laboratory of Japan.

== Concept ==
general LDR concept mechanics

The liquid droplet radiator (LDR) system consists of a droplet generator, a collector, a heat exchanger, a recirculating pump, and a bellows-type pressure regulator (accumulator). While undergoing a reduction in pressure the saturated liquid is sprayed into space as coherent streams of tiny, discrete droplets. The droplet stream can be a column or a sheet of liquid droplets moving through space from the droplet generator to the collector. The droplets carry the waste heat generated by a space power system and radiate this waste heat directly to space during their flight by transient radiative heat transfer. The liquid droplets are collected at a lower temperature, reheated, and pumped to the droplet generator and reused to continue to remove waste heat from the thermodynamic power cycle.

The pressure at which liquid droplets are formed can vary widely in different applications, but it was found that once the droplet flow has been established, substantially lower pressures are needed to maintain the flow of droplet streams.

== Heat transfer ==
Spacecraft waste heat is ultimately rejected to space by radiator surfaces. Radiators can be of different forms, such as spacecraft structural panels, flat-plate radiators mounted to the side of the spacecraft, panels deployed after the spacecraft is on orbit, and droplets. All radiators reject heat by infrared (IR) radiation from their surfaces. The radiating power depends on the surface's emittance and temperature. The radiator must reject both the spacecraft waste heat plus any radiant-heat loads from the environment or other spacecraft surfaces. Most radiators are therefore given surface finishes with high IR emittance (ε > 0.8) to maximize heat rejection and low solar absorption (α < 0.2) to limit heat loads from the sun. High-temperature radiators are preferred for better efficiency and size reduction considerations, however, fluid property and droplet cloud property are additional factors. Droplet size formation and droplet density govern emission and reabsorption. A smaller droplet is essential for obtaining effective radiation in the liquid droplet radiator. A droplet with a diameter of 1 μm has been calculated to cool from 500 K to 252 K in two seconds. A dense cloud of the droplet sheet will retard the cooling rate of the droplets because of the reabsorption of the emitted light.

A single droplet radiates heat as it travels through space and at any time this heat loss is given by:

$\dot{q}= (4 \pi a^2) \sigma F T^4$

where $\sigma$ is the Stefan–Boltzmann constant, $\dot{q}$ is the droplet heat loss rate to space (joules/second), $a$ is the droplet radius (meters), $F$ is the average gray body view factor for droplet at stream center (less than one), and $T$ is the absolute droplet temperature at any time (kelvin).

This equation models the droplet as a gray body with constant average emissivity. The instantaneous radiation rate is equal to the rate of energy loss resulting in this equation:

$(4 \pi a^2 ) \sigma F T^4 = - c \rho \frac{ 4 \pi a^3 }{ 3 } \frac{ dT }{ dt }$

where $c$ is the specific heat capacity, $\rho$ is the density of droplet (kg/m^{3}), $t$ is the droplet transit time (seconds).

== Limitations, challenges and solutions ==
The operating environment is not simply black space, but one with solar radiation and diffuse radiation reflected and emitted from the sun (stars), earth, other objects, and or the spacecraft's own propulsion. It is possible to "orient" the droplet sheet edge towards an external heat source but the sheet area would still be subject to radiation from other sources. Most of the presented solutions of the equation of radiative transfer are practical simplifications by introducing assumptions.

In order to achieve high collection efficiency, splashing of the droplet on the collector surface has to be minimized. It was determined that droplet collector with an incidence angle of 35 degrees can prevent a uniform droplet stream with droplet diameter 250 μm and a velocity of 16 m/s from splashing under microgravity condition. Another solution is to have a liquid film formed on the inner surface of the collector. When the droplet streams are absorbed in this liquid film, no splashes should be formed. A miscapture rate of incoming droplets was required to be less than 10^{−6}. The droplet diameter was determined to be less than 300 μm and the droplet speed less than 20 m/s. If a ferrofluid is used a magnetic focusing means can effectively suppress splashing.

As the droplet sheet is in free fall a spacecraft performing a maneuver or angular acceleration would lose coolant. Even a magnetically focused LDR has a very limited tolerance of less than 10^{−3} g.

A droplet generator has approximately 10^{5} – 10^{6} holes (orifices) per system with diameters of 50–20 μm. These orifices are more susceptible to damage than a conventional solid radiator or heat pipe which may affect droplet formation and droplet stream flow direction, potentially causing fluid loss.

== Liquids ==
Liquids with low vapor pressures are preferred for the working fluids to minimize evaporation loss due to flash evaporation. Liquids have been found that in the range of 300 to 900 K have a vapor pressure so low that the evaporation loss during the normal lifetime of a space system (possibly as long as 30 years) will be only a small fraction of the total mass of the radiator. Operating life of the fluid in the LDR environment is affected by thermal stability, oxidative stability, and resistance to radiation.

temperature range (K)	coolant type	example
250 K – 350 K	silicone oils siloxane	Trimethyl-Pentaphenyl-Trisiloxane
370 K – 650 K	liquid metal eutectics	
500 K – 1000 K	liquid tin	

If a liquid metal is used as the coolant, the pumping of the liquid may use an electromagnetic device. The device induces eddy currents in the metal that generate a Lorentz force with their associated magnetic fields. The effect is the pumping of the liquid metal resulting in a simplified design with no moving parts. This is known as MHD pumping. For example, a simple mixture of mineral oil and iron filings was found to approximate a suitable ferrofluid for several seconds, before separation of the iron filings and oil was observed in the presence of a magnetic field. At droplet sizes of approximately 200 μm, surface tension will hold the two components at accelerations up to about 1 g.

If an ionic fluid is used as the coolant, the fluid can be used for momentum transfer between spacecraft traveling at different speeds. It may be possible to synthesize the fluid in-situ. For example, BMIM-BF4 ( [C_{8}H_{15}N_{2}]^{+}BF_{4}^{−}) is 42.5% carbon by mass. Lunar regolith typically contains several compounds with carbon and about 5% of asteroids are carbonaceous chondrites which are rich in carbon as well as metals and water. It may be possible to mine the moon for carbon and combine it with other elements to produce ionic fluid. Another good source of carbon is Mars' largest moon, Phobos, which is a captured asteroid believed to be rich in carbon.

== LDR design configurations ==
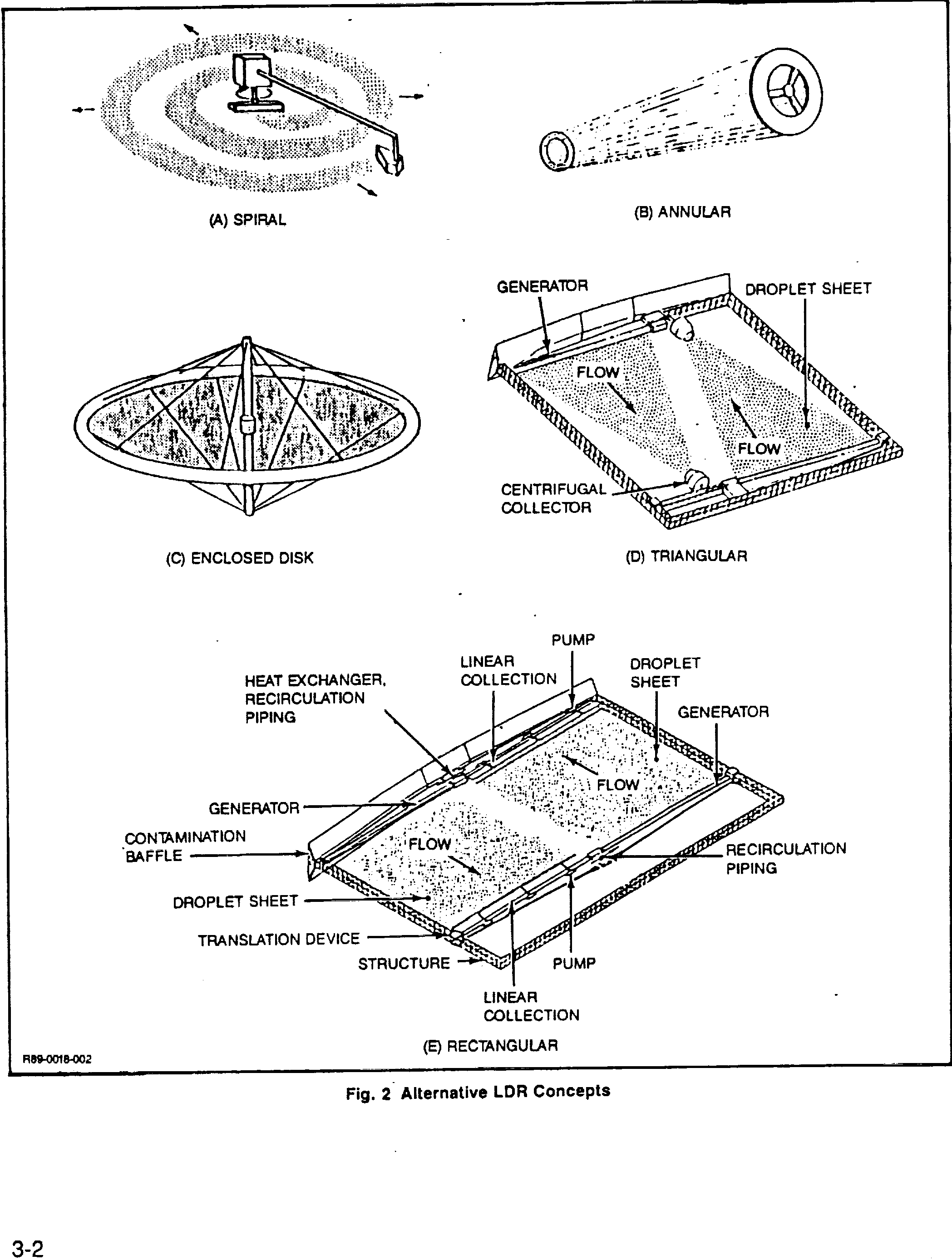
different LDR configurations

There are two different droplet collection schemes: the centrifugal approach and the linear collection scheme. The linear collector is considered to be simpler, more reliable and lighter.

Several different LDR configurations have been proposed and evaluated.

- The spiral LDR employs a generator and collector which rotate at the same angular velocity. This concept was considered more complex due to unnecessary rotation of the collector.
- The enclosed disc LDR contains a droplet generator at the center for creating a disc of droplets. Only the collector rotates. The entire radiator is enclosed by a transparent shroud, which minimizes spacecraft contamination resulting from any errant droplets. This concept was considered more complex due to unnecessary rotation of the collector.
- The annular LDR utilizes a rotating collector to capture an annular sheet of droplets from an annular generator. The annular LDR has an inefficient radiative performance – the sheet radiates to itself more than the droplet sheets of alternate configurations.
- Several proposed variations of the LDR utilize electric fields to control droplet trajectories as in the ink jet printer. The Electrostatic THermal (Energy) Radiator (ETHER) is essentially a proposed variation of the LDR. The droplets are charged and in conjunction with a charge on the spacecraft that is opposite the droplet charge, the droplets will execute a slightly elliptical orbit. This closed trajectory would reduce overall system size. This concept calls for concerns about droplet-plasma interactions. Further, in low Earth orbit the spacecraft will acquire its own potential.

Rectangular and triangular versions of the LDR have been investigated the most.

- The rectangular LDR employs a linear collector which is as wide as the droplet generator. The collector can be two sided, where two droplet sheets traveling in opposite directions impact a single collector. An alternate variation would utilize a one sided collector, with only one generator and droplet sheet. In a rectangular LDR, there is no focusing of the droplet sheet, and the droplet number density remains constant along the flight path. It is the simplest LDR design with the largest radiating area.
- The triangular LDR concept employs a droplet generator to form a converging stream array (sheet) of droplets. The collector, located at the convergence point of the droplet sheet, employs a centrifugal force to capture the droplets. The triangular LDR is inherently less massive, because of the smaller collector. System studies have indicated that a triangular LDR can be 40 percent less massive than a rectangular LDR. However, for any comparable size the triangular LDR has half the area of a rectangular sheet and therefore rejects less heat. Currently, the use of pitot tube pickups has replaced the initial complex rotating seals. Collisions in a focused droplet sheet result in coalescence of the impacting droplets. The triangular LDR is now being developed more extensively.
- The magnetically focused LDR employs a magnetic field to focus streams of droplets directed from the generator toward the collector, thereby assuring that essentially all of the droplets captured, even though some of the streams may be misdirected as they leave the generator. The magnetic focusing means is also effective to suppress splashing of liquid when the droplets impinge on the collector. The magnetically focused LDR was investigated and patented by the Brookhaven National Laboratory (BNL) under a grant by the Department of Energy (Contract DE-AC02-76CH00016). The magnetic means can be achieved with a toroidal shaped electro-magnet or permanent magnets. As only one side of the droplet sheet would be focused by a single permanent magnet, an even number has to be placed across each other adjacent to the collector. A permanent dipole magnet has limited field strength, hence limits radiator size. Electromagnets or (cryogenic cooled) superconducting magnets offer higher field strengths, but may have mass tradeoff. A major conclusion drawn from calculations is that a spacecraft can be maneuvered at accelerations less than 10^{−3} g. Higher accelerations require numerous smaller LDRs which will be more massive in the sum, but would to be more likely to survive.

== Further research ==
The LDR is being studied as a byproduct of a concept using a fluid stream for momentum transfer between an approaching spacecraft and another spacecraft, station or Moon base. This method could reduce spacecraft mass while increasing space flight efficiency.

A Liquid Sheet Radiator (LRS), adapted for planetary surfaces, is essentially a fountain enclosed in a transparent envelope. The liquid flows down on the inside of this envelope. The liquid sheet radiator concept is exceptionally stable and does not require special machining of the orifice to achieve its performance.

== See also ==
- Evaporative cooler
- Project Valkyrie
