= International Conference on Environmental Systems =

Conference on human spaceflight technology and space human factors

ICES logo from 1971 to 2023

ICES logo since 2024

The International Conference on Environmental Systems, or ICES (known prior to 1990 as the Intersociety Conference on Environmental Systems), is an annual technical conference focusing on human spaceflight technology and space human factors. Session topics include: Environmental Control and Life Support Systems (ECLSS), thermal control, life sciences, extra-vehicular activity (EVA) systems (including space suit design and human-robot interaction), space architecture, and mission planning for exploration.

Since 1971 the conference has taken place every year except for 2020, when it was canceled due to the Covid pandemic.

== History ==
The first ICES conference was held in San Francisco in 1971, after three years of work by members of Environmental Control and Life Support System specialist committees representing four different societies: the American Society of Mechanical Engineers (ASME), the Society of Automotive Engineers (SAE), the American Institute of Aeronautics and Astronautics (AIAA), and the Aerospace Medical Association (AsMA). It replaced three other meetings held each year as part of various society conference programs and since then it has been held every year. In 1972, the American Institute of Chemical Engineers (AIChE) became the fifth and final co-sponsoring society for ICES.

Prior to 1990, ICES organization was US-only. In 1990 it became international, by merging the American conference with a similar conference held in Europe, and ICES started to be held abroad (for the first time in Germany in 1994). Since 2000, the ICES conference nominally takes place four times out of five in the US and once in five years outside US (so far in 2000, 2003, 2005, 2010, 2016, 2023, 2025).

For its first 39 years, the main ICES organizer was the Society of Automotive Engineers; from 2010 through 2013, the American Institute of Aeronautics and Astronautics filled the role of main organizer, supported by American Institute of Chemical Engineers, American Society of Mechanical Engineers and ICES International Committee. Starting in 2014, the conference became an independent entity that was organized by Texas Tech University. in 2014 and 2015. In 2016, the conference became independent with its own website at http://www.ices.space whilst AIAA, AIChE, ASME, and the ICES International Committee continue organizing the conference sessions. As of 2024, ICES is organized by the ICES Steering Committee and five technical committees, with financial support coming from the sponsorship of several private companies.

Papers presented at ICES are published every year in the conference proceedings, from 1971 to 2009 by SAE, then from 2010 to 2013 by AIAA. These papers are available and searchable online respectively at the SAE and AIAA websites. Since 2014, proceedings, hosted by Texas Tech University, are publicly accessible from the ICES conference website.

== Conference locations ==
North American conference locations as of 2024. Cities in blue have hosted multiple times.
European conference locations as of 2025.

The conference is located primarily in the United States, and was located exclusively on the west coast of the US for its first 19 years. Since 1994, the conference has taken place in Europe roughly once every five years.

Year	Location
1971	San Francisco, California
1972	San Diego, California
1973	San Diego, California
1974	Seattle, Washington
1975	San Francisco, California
1976	San Diego, California
1977	San Francisco, California
1978	San Francisco, California
1979	San Francisco, California
1980	San Diego, California
1981	San Francisco, California
1982	San Diego, California
1983	San Francisco, California
1984	San Diego, California
1985	San Francisco, California
1986	San Diego, California
1987	Seattle, Washington
1988	San Francisco, California
1989	San Diego, California
1990	Williamsburg, Virginia
1991	San Francisco, California
1992	Seattle, Washington
1993	Colorado Springs, Colorado
1994	Friedrichshafen, Germany
1995	San Diego, California
1996	Monterey, California
1997	Lake Tahoe, Nevada
1998	Danvers, Massachusetts
1999	Denver, Colorado
2000	Toulouse, France
2001	Orlando, Florida
2002	San Antonio, Texas
2003	Vancouver, British Columbia, Canada
2004	Colorado Springs, Colorado
2005	Rome, Italy
2006	Norfolk, Virginia
2007	Chicago, Illinois
2008	San Francisco, California
2009	Savannah, Georgia
2010	Barcelona, Spain
2011	Portland, Oregon
2012	San Diego, California
2013	Vail, Colorado
2014	Tucson, Arizona
2015	Bellevue, Washington
2016	Vienna, Austria
2017	Charleston, South Carolina
2018	Albuquerque, New Mexico
2019	Boston, Massachusetts
2020	postponed to 2021
2021	Virtual
2022	St. Paul, Minnesota
2023	Calgary, Alberta, Canada
2024	Louisville, Kentucky
2025	Prague, Czech Republic
2026	Rio Grande, Puerto Rico

== Organization ==
The ICES conference is organized by the following committees:

- ICES Steering Committee
- AIAA Life Sciences and Systems Technical Committee (AIAA-LS&S)
- ECLSS and ISRU Committee (EIC, formerly AIChE Environmental Systems Committee)
- ICES Crew Systems Technical Committee (ICS, formerly ASME Crew Systems Technical Committee)
- ICES Thermal and Environmental Control Systems Committee (TECS, initially SAE Committee SC 9, Spacecraft Environmental Control and Life Support Systems, then SAE Space Environmental Systems Committee, then AIAA Space Environmental Systems Program Committee)
- ICES International Committee (IIC)

Initially the conference was co-organized also by the AsMA Life Sciences and Biomedical Engineering Branch Executive Committee, now discontinued.

== See also ==
- Vision for Space Exploration
