= Spacecraft thermal control =

Process of keeping all parts of a spacecraft within acceptable temperature ranges

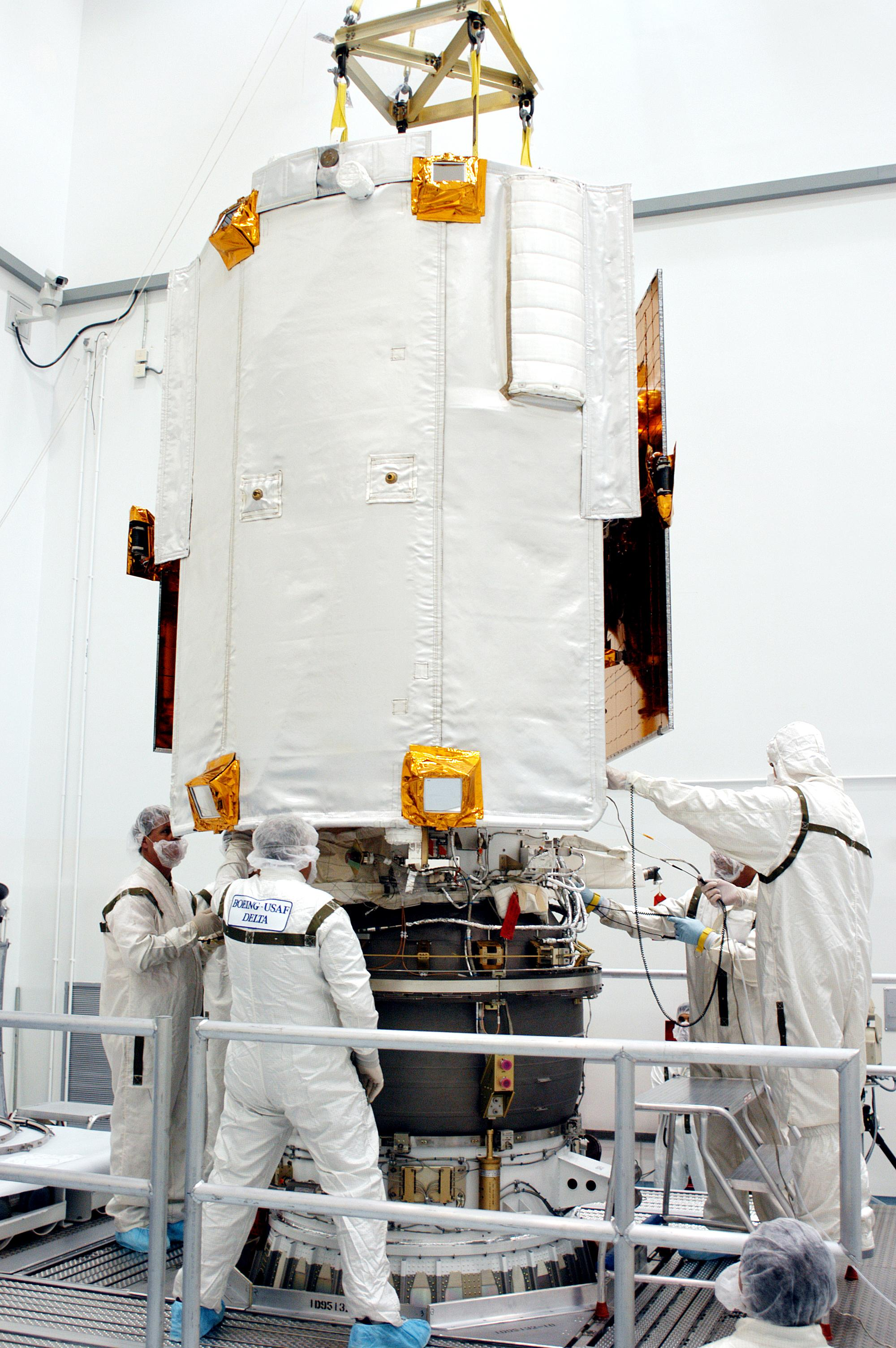
Sunshade of MESSENGER, orbiter of planet Mercury

In spacecraft design, the function of the thermal control system (TCS) is to keep all the spacecraft's component systems within acceptable temperature ranges during all mission phases. It must cope with the external environment, which can vary in a wide range as the spacecraft is exposed to the extreme coldness found in the shadows of deep space or to the intense heat found in the unfiltered direct sunlight of outer space. A TCS must also moderate the internal heat generated by the operation of the spacecraft it serves.

A TCS can eject heat passively through the simple and natural infrared radiation of the spacecraft itself, or actively through an externally mounted infrared radiation coil.

Thermal control is essential to guarantee the optimal performance and success of the mission because if a component is subjected to temperatures which are too high or too low, it could be damaged or its performance could be severely affected. Thermal control is also necessary to keep specific components (such as optical sensors, atomic clocks, etc.) within a specified temperature stability requirement, to ensure that they perform as efficiently as possible.

== Active or passive systems ==
The thermal control subsystem can be composed of both passive and active items and works in two ways:

- Protecting the equipment from overheating, either by thermal insulation from external heat fluxes (such as the Sun or the planetary infrared and albedo flux), or by proper heat removal from internal sources (such as the heat emitted by the internal electronic equipment).
- Protecting the equipment from temperatures that are too low, by thermal insulation from external sinks, by enhanced heat absorption from external sources, or by heat release from internal sources.

Passive thermal control system (PTCS) components include:

- Multi-layer insulation (MLI), which protects the spacecraft from excessive solar or planetary heating, as well as from excessive cooling when exposed to deep space.
- Coatings that change the thermo-optical properties of external surfaces.
- Thermal fillers to improve the thermal coupling at selected interfaces (for instance, on the thermal path between an electronic unit and its radiator).
- Thermal washers, often referred to as thermal breaks, to reduce the thermal coupling at selected interfaces.
- Thermal doublers to spread on the radiator surface the heat dissipated by equipment.
- Mirrors (secondary surface mirrors, SSM, or optical solar reflectors, OSR) to improve the heat rejection capability of the external radiators and at the same time to reduce the absorption of external solar fluxes.
- Radioisotope heater units (RHU), used by some planetary and exploratory missions to produce heat for TCS purposes.
- Barbecue roll - a slow roll along the spacecraft's long axis to prevent the Sun over heating one side, like a rotisserie chicken rotating as it is cooked.

Active thermal control system (ATCS) components include:

- Thermostatically controlled resistive electric heaters to keep the equipment temperature above its lower limit during the mission's cold phases.
- Fluid loops to transfer the heat emitted by equipment to the radiators. They can be:
  - single-phase loops, controlled by a pump;
  - two-phase loops, composed of heat pipes (HP), loop heat pipes (LHP) or capillary pumped loops (CPL).
- Louvers (which change the heat rejection capability to space as a function of temperature).
- Thermoelectric coolers.

== Thermal control systems ==
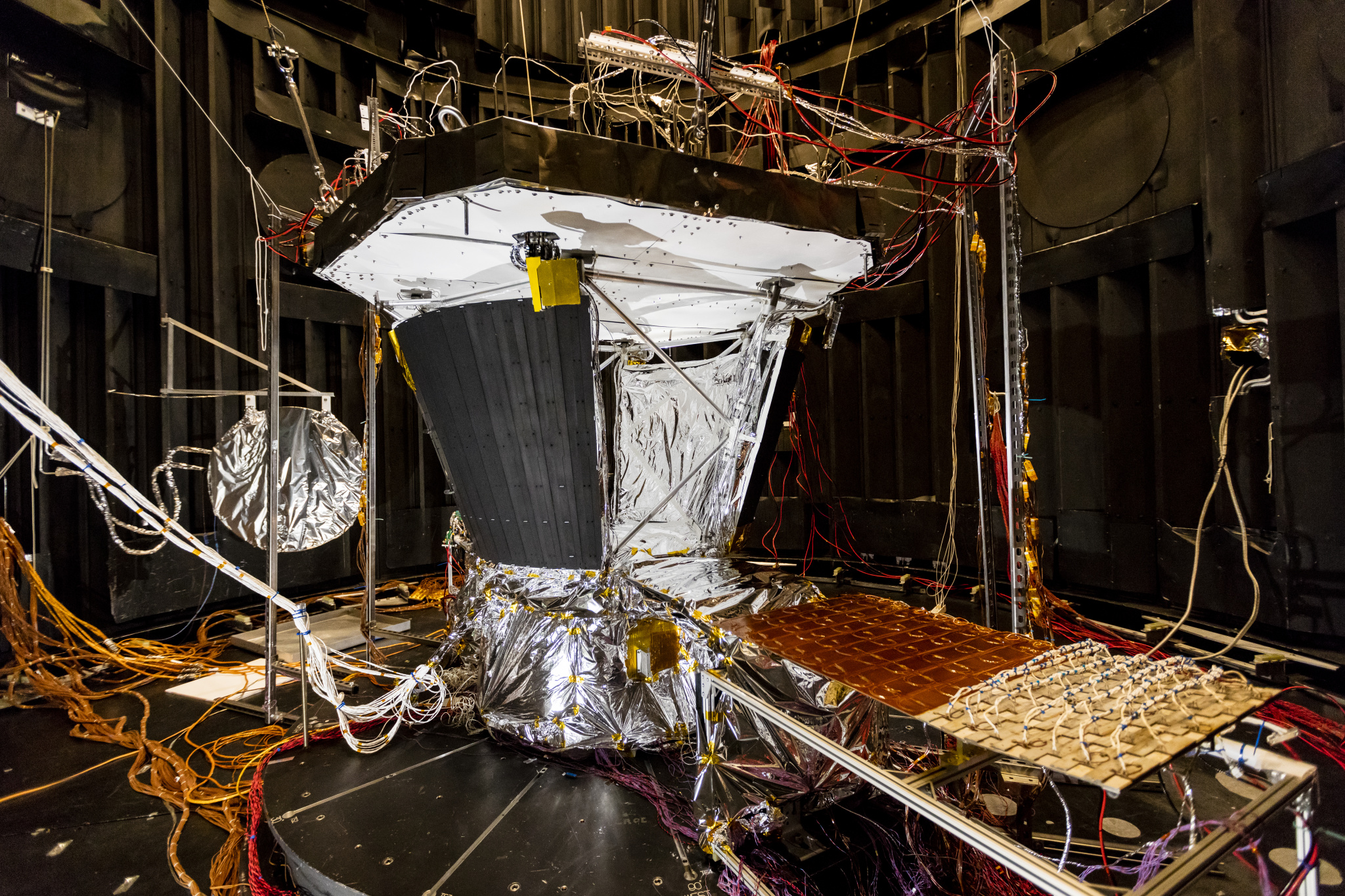
Parker Solar Probe in thermal testing

A thermal control system can have various purposes, the most notable of which are:

- Environment interaction
  - Includes the interaction of the external surfaces of the spacecraft with the environment. Either the surfaces need to be protected from the environment, or there has to be improved interaction. Two main goals of environment interaction are the reduction or increase of absorbed environmental fluxes and reduction or increase of heat losses to the environment.
- Heat collection
  - Includes the removal of dissipated heat from the equipment in which it is created to avoid unwanted increases in the spacecraft's temperature.
- Heat transport
  - Is taking the heat from where it is created to a radiating device.
- Heat rejection
  - The heat collected and transported has to be rejected at an appropriate temperature to a heat sink, which is usually the surrounding space environment. The rejection temperature depends on the amount of heat involved, the temperature to be controlled and the temperature of the environment into which the device radiates the heat.
- Heat provision and storage
  - Is to maintain a desired temperature level where heat has to be provided and suitable heat storage capability has to be foreseen.

== Environment ==
For a spacecraft, the main environmental interactions are the energy coming from the Sun and the heat radiated to deep space. Other parameters also influence the thermal control system design, such as the spacecraft's altitude, orbit, attitude stabilization, and spacecraft shape. Different types of orbit, such as low earth orbit and geostationary orbit, also affect the design of the thermal control system.

- Low Earth orbit (LEO)
  - This orbit is frequently used by spacecraft that monitor or measure the characteristics of the Earth and its surrounding environment and by uncrewed and crewed space laboratories, such as EURECA and the International Space Station. The orbit's proximity to the Earth has a great influence on the thermal control system needs, with the Earth's infrared emission and albedo playing a very important role, as well as the relatively short orbital period, less than 2 hours, and long eclipse duration. Small instruments or spacecraft appendages such as solar panels that have low thermal inertia can be seriously affected by this continuously changing environment and may require very specific thermal design solutions.
- Geostationary orbit (GEO)
  - In this 24-hour orbit, the Earth's influence is almost negligible, except for the shadowing during eclipses, which can vary in duration from zero at solstice to a maximum of 1.2 hours at equinox. Long eclipses influence the design of both the spacecraft's insulation and heating systems. The seasonal variations in the direction and intensity of the solar input have a great impact on the design, complicating the heat transport by the need to convey most of the dissipated heat to the radiator in shadow, and the heat-rejection systems via the increased radiator area needed. Almost all telecommunications and many meteorological satellites are in this type of orbit.
- Highly eccentric orbits (HEO)
  - These orbits can have a wide range of apogee and perigee altitudes, depending on the particular mission. Generally, they are used for astronomy observatories, and the TCS design requirements depend on the spacecraft's orbital period, the number and duration of the eclipses, the relative attitude of Earth, Sun and spacecraft, the type of instruments onboard and their individual temperature requirements. Molniya orbits, with perigee altitudes lying in the LEO range of about 550 km and apogee altitudes (about 38,900 km) lying in the vicinity of the GEO altitude, are an example of this type of orbit.
- Deep space and planetary exploration
  - An interplanetary trajectory exposes spacecraft to a wide range of thermal environments more severe than those encountered around Earth's orbits. Interplanetary mission includes many different sub-scenarios depending on the particular celestial body. In general, the common features are a long mission duration and the need to cope with extreme thermal conditions, such as cruises either close to or far away from the Sun (from 1 to 4–5 AU), low orbiting of very cold or very hot celestial bodies, descents through hostile atmospheres, and survival in the extreme (dusty, icy) environments on the surfaces of the bodies visited. The challenge for the TCS is to provide enough heat-rejection capability during the hot operating phases and yet still survive the cold inactive ones. The major problem is often the provision of the power required for that survival phase.

== Temperature requirements ==
The temperature requirements of the instruments and equipment on board are the main factors in the design of the thermal control system. The goal of the TCS is to keep all the instruments working within their allowable temperature range. All of the electronic instruments on board the spacecraft, such as cameras, data-collection devices, batteries, etc., have a fixed operating temperature range. Keeping these instruments in their optimal operational temperature range is crucial for every mission. Some examples of temperature ranges include

- Lithium-ion batteries, which have a very narrow operating temperature range in spacecraft operations, typically between −5 and 20°C.
- Propulsion components, which have a typical range of 5 to 40°C for safety reasons, however, a wider range is acceptable.
- Cameras, which have a range of −30 to 40°C.
- Solar arrays, which have a wide operating range of −150 to 100°C.
- Infrared spectrometers, which have a range of −40 to 60°C.

== Current technologies ==
=== Coating ===
Coatings are the simplest and least expensive of the TCS techniques. A coating may be paint or a more sophisticated chemical applied to the surfaces of the spacecraft to lower or increase heat transfer. The characteristics of the type of coating depends on their absorptivity, emissivity, transparency, and reflectivity. The main disadvantage of coating is that it degrades quickly due to the operating environment. Coatings can also be applied in the form of adhesive tape or stickers to reduce degradation.

=== Multilayer insulation (MLI) ===
Multilayer insulation (MLI) is the most common passive thermal control element used on spacecraft. MLI prevents both heat losses to the environment and excessive heating from the environment. Spacecraft components such as propellant tanks, propellant lines, batteries, and solid rocket motors are also covered in MLI blankets to maintain ideal operating temperature. MLI consist of an outer cover layer, interior layer, and an inner cover layer. The outer cover layer needs to be opaque to sunlight, generate a low amount of particulate contaminants, and be able to survive in the environment and temperature to which the spacecraft will be exposed. Some common materials used for the outer layer are fiberglass woven cloth impregnated with PTFE Teflon, PVF reinforced with Nomex bonded with polyester adhesive, and FEP Teflon. The general requirement for the interior layer is that it needs to have a low emittance. The most commonly used material for this layer is Mylar aluminized on one or both sides. The interior layers are usually thin compared to the outer layer to save weight and are perforated to aid in venting trapped air during launch. The inner cover faces the spacecraft hardware and is used to protect the thin interior layers. Inner covers are often not aluminized in order to prevent electrical shorts. Some materials used for the inner covers are Dacron and Nomex netting. Mylar is not used because of flammability concerns. MLI blankets are an important element of the thermal control system.

=== Louvers ===
Louvers are active thermal control elements that are used in many different forms, although they may be considered passive if they do not require power input. Most commonly they are placed over external radiators, louvers can also be used to control heat transfer between internal spacecraft surfaces or be placed on openings on the spacecraft walls. A louver in its fully open state can reject six times as much heat as it does in its fully closed state, with no power required to operate it. The most commonly used louver is the bimetallic, spring-actuated, rectangular blade louver also known as venetian-blind louver. Louver radiator assemblies consist of five main elements: baseplate, blades, actuators, sensing elements, and structural elements.

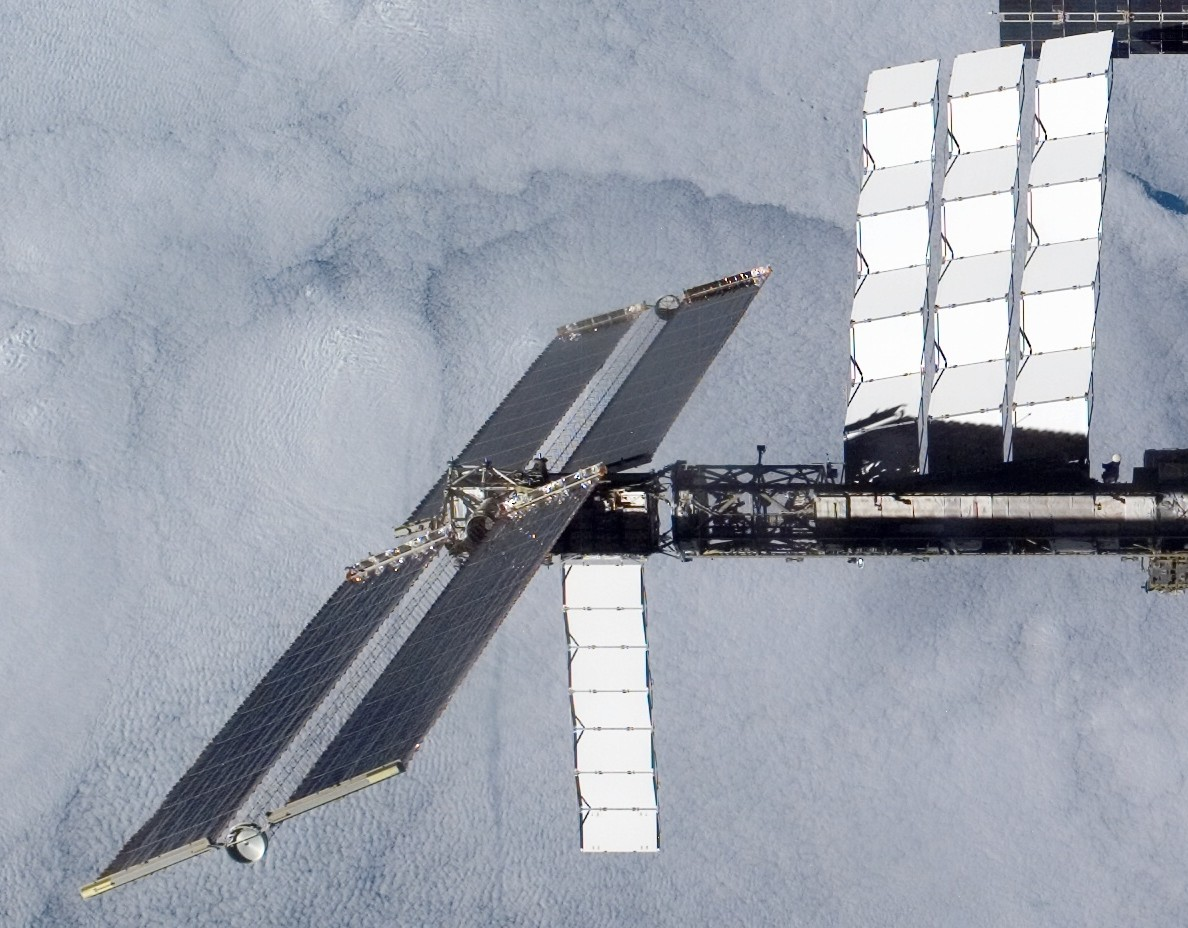
Panels and radiators (rectangular white panels) on the ISS after STS-120

=== Heaters ===
Heaters are used in thermal control design to protect components under cold-case environmental conditions or to make up for heat that is not dissipated. Heaters are used with thermostats or solid-state controllers to provide exact temperature control of a particular component. Another common use for heaters is to warm up components to their minimal operating temperatures before the components are turned on.

- The most common type of heater used on spacecraft is the patch heater, which consists of an electrical-resistance element sandwiched between two sheets of flexible electrically insulating material, such as Kapton. The patch heater may contain either a single circuit or multiple circuits, depending on whether or not redundancy is required within it.
- Another type of heater, the cartridge heater, is often used to heat blocks of material or high-temperature components such as propellants. This heater consists of a coiled resistor enclosed in a cylindrical metallic case. Typically a hole is drilled in the component to be heated, and the cartridge is potted into the hole. Cartridge heaters are usually a quarter-inch or less in diameter and up to a few inches long.
- Another type of heater used on spacecraft is the radioisotope heater units, also known as RHUs. RHUs are used for travelling to outer planets past Jupiter due to very low solar radiance, which greatly reduces the power generated from solar panels. These heaters do not require any electrical power from the spacecraft and provide direct heat where it is needed. At the center of each RHU is a radioactive material, which decays to provide heat. The most commonly used material is plutonium dioxide. A single RHU weighs just 42 grams and can fit in a cylindrical enclosure 26 mm in diameter and 32 mm long. Each unit also generates 1 W of heat at encapsulation, however the heat generation rate decreases with time. A total of 117 RHUs were used on the Cassini mission.

=== Radiators ===
Excess waste heat created on the spacecraft is rejected to space by the use of radiators. Radiators come in several different forms, such as spacecraft structural panels, flat-plate radiators mounted to the side of the spacecraft, and panels deployed after the spacecraft is on orbit. Whatever the configuration, all radiators reject heat by infrared (IR) radiation from their surfaces. The radiating power depends on the surface's emittance and temperature. The radiator must reject both the spacecraft waste heat and any radiant-heat loads from the environment. Most radiators are therefore given surface finishes with high IR emittance to maximize heat rejection and low solar absorptance to limit heat from the Sun. Most spacecraft radiators reject between 100 and 350 W of internally generated electronics waste heat per square meter. Radiators' weight typically varies from almost nothing, if an existing structural panel is used as a radiator, to around 12 kg/m^{2} for a heavy deployable radiator and its support structure.

The radiators of the International Space Station are clearly visible as arrays of white square panels attached to the main truss.

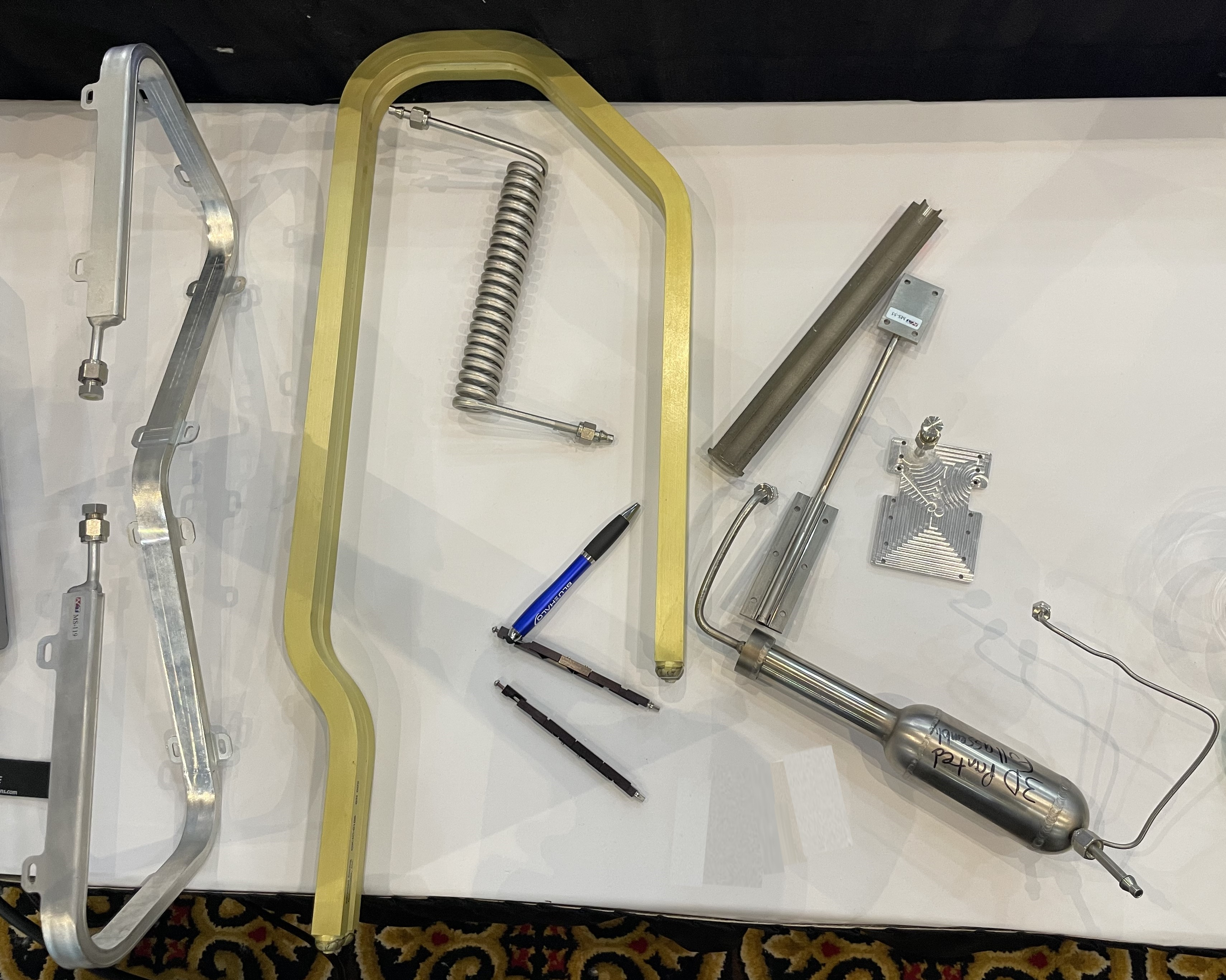
A collection of heat pipes and other components used for spacecraft thermal management

=== Heat pipes ===
Heat pipes use a closed two-phase liquid-flow cycle with an evaporator and a condenser to transport relatively large quantities of heat from one location to another without electrical power. Aerospace-grade specific heat pipes, such as constant-conductance heat pipes (CCHPs) or axial-groove heat pipes, are aluminum extrusions with ammonia used as the working fluid. Typical applications include payload thermal management, heat transport, isothermalization, and radiator panel thermal enhancement.

== Future of thermal control systems ==
- Various composite materials
- Heat rejection through advanced passive radiators
- Spray cooling devices (e.g. liquid droplet radiator)
- Lightweight thermal insulation
- Variable-emittance technologies
- Diamond films
- Advanced thermal control coatings
  - Microsheets
  - Advanced spray on thin films
  - Silvered quartz mirrors
  - Advanced metallized polymer-based films
- 3D printed evaporators for Loop Heat Pipes
- Space Copper-water Heat Pipes for chip-level cooling

== Conferences ==
A major event in the field of space thermal control is the International Conference on Environmental Systems, started in 1971 and organized every year by AIAA. Another is the European Space Thermal Analysis Workshop.

== Sun shield ==
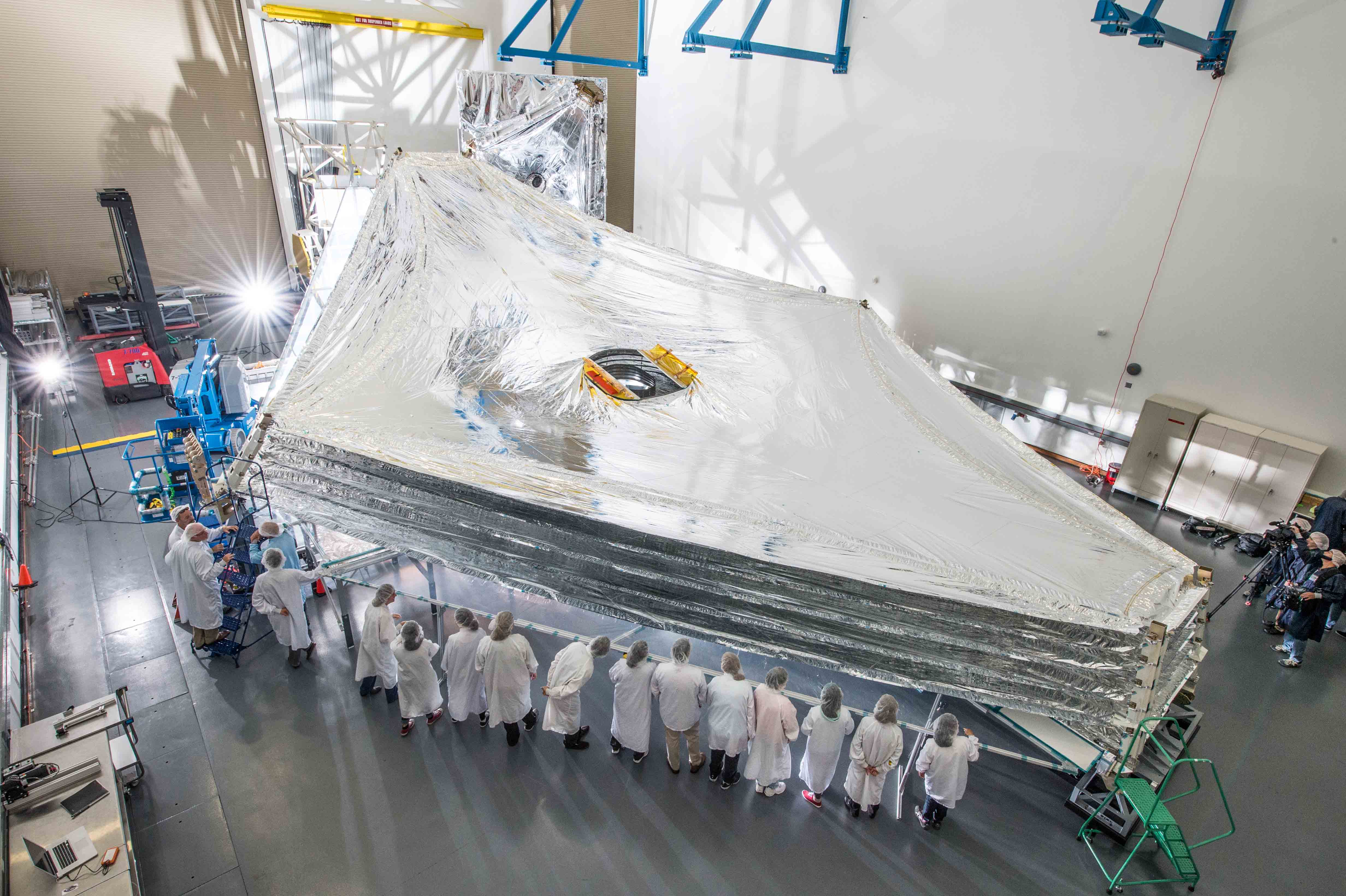
Sunshield full-size test for the James Webb Space Telescope

In spacecraft design, a sun shield restricts or reduces heat caused by sunlight hitting a spacecraft. An example of use of a thermal shield is on the Infrared Space Observatory. The ISO sunshield helped protect the cryostat from sunlight, and it was also covered with solar panels. Another example is the James Webb Space Telescope sunshield.

For spacecraft approaching the Sun, the sunshade is usually called a heatshield. Notable spacecraft with heatshields include:

- Messenger, launched 2004, orbited Mercury until 2015, had a ceramic cloth sunshade
- Parker Solar Probe, launched 2018, has a heatshield made of carbon, carbon-foam, carbon sandwich
- Solar Orbiter, launched in 2020
- BepiColombo, Mercury orbiter, with Optical Solar Reflectors (acting as a sunshade) on the Planetary Orbiter component.

This is not to be confused with the concept of a global-scale sunshield in geoengineering, often called a space sunshade or "sunshield", in which the spacecraft itself is used to block sunlight to a planet.

== See also ==
- Environmental control and life-support system
- Space sunshade
- Temperature control

== Bibliography ==
- Gilmore, D. G., “Satellite Thermal Control Handbook”, The Aerospace Corporation Press, 1994.
- Karam, R. D., Satellite Thermal Control for Systems Engineers, Progress in Astronautics and Aeronautics, AIAA, 1998.
- Gilmore, D. G., “Spacecraft Thermal Control Handbook 2nd ed.”, The Aerospace Corporation Press, 2002.
- De Parolis, M. N., and W. Pinter-Krainer. Current and Future Techniques for Spacecraft Thermal Control 1. Design Drivers and Current Technologies. 1 Aug 1996. Web: 5 Sep 2014.
