= Spacecraft design =

Spacecraft design is a process where systems engineering principles are systemically applied in order to construct complex vehicles for missions involving travel, operation or exploration in outer space. This design process produces the detailed design specifications, schematics, and plans for the spacecraft system, including comprehensive documentation outlining the spacecraft's architecture, subsystems, components, interfaces, and operational requirements, and potentially some prototype models or simulations, all of which taken together serve as the blueprint for manufacturing, assembly, integration, and testing of the spacecraft to ensure that it meets mission objectives and performance criteria.

Spacecraft design is conducted in several phases. Initially, a conceptual design is made to determine the feasibility and desirability of a new spacecraft system, showing that a credible design exists to carry out the mission. The conceptual design review ensures that the design meets the mission statement without any technical flaws while being internally consistent. Next, a preliminary design is carried out, where the focus is on functional performance, requirements definition, and interface definition at both subsystem and system levels. The preliminary design review evaluates the adequacy of the preliminary design. In the following phase, detailed design is drawn and coded for the system as a whole and all the subsystems, and a critical design review is performed where it is evaluated whether the design is sufficiently detailed to fabricate, integrate, and test the system.

Throughout spacecraft design, potential risks are rigorously identified, assessed, and mitigated, systems components are properly integrated and comprehensively tested. The entire lifecycle (including launch, mission operations and end-of-mission disposal) is taken into account. An iterative process of reviews and testing is continuously employed to refine, optimize and enhance the design's effectiveness and reliability. In particular, the spacecraft's mass, power, thermal control, propulsion, altitude control, telecommunication, command and data, and structural aspects are taken into consideration. Choosing the right launch vehicle and adapting the design to the chosen launch vehicle is also important. Regulatory compliance, adherence to International standards, designing for a sustainable, debris-free space environment are some other considerations that have become important in recent times.

Spacecraft design includes the design of both robotic spacecraft (satellites and planetary probes), and spacecraft for human spaceflight (spaceships and space stations). Human-carrying spacecraft require additional life-support systems, crew accommodation, and safety measures to support human occupants, as well as human factor engineering considerations such as ergonomics, crew comfort, and psychological well-being. Robotic spacecraft require autonomy, reliability, and remote operation capabilities without human presence. The distinctive nature and the unique needs and constraints related to each of them significantly impact spacecraft design considerations.

Recent developments in spacecraft design include electric propulsion systems (e.g. ion thrusters and Hall-effect thrusters) for high-specific-impulse propulsion, solar sails (using solar radiation pressure) for continuous thrust without the need for traditional rockets, additive manufacturing (3D printing) and advanced materials (e.g. advanced composites, nano-materials and smart materials) for rapid prototyping and production of lightweight and durable components, artificial intelligence and machine learning-assisted autonomous systems for spacecraft autonomy and improved operational efficiency in long and faraway missions, in situ resource using (ISRU) technologies for extraction and usage of local resources on celestial bodies, and CubeSats and other standard miniature satellites for cost-effective space missions around Earth.

Spacecraft design involves experts from various fields such as engineering, physics, mathematics, computer science, etc. who come together to collaborate and participate in interdisciplinary teamwork. Furthermore, international collaboration and partnerships between space agencies and countries help share expertise, resources, and capabilities for the mutual benefit of all parties. The challenges of spacecraft design drive technological innovation and engineering breakthroughs in professional and industrial sectors. The complexity of spacecraft design engages students in STEM subjects (science, technology, engineering, and mathematics), fosters scientific literacy and inspire the next generation of scientists, engineers, and innovators.

== Origin ==
Spacecraft design was born as a discipline in the 1950s and 60s with the advent of American and Soviet space exploration programs. Since then it has progressed, although typically less than comparable terrestrial technologies. This is for a large part due to the challenging space environment, but also to the lack of basic R&D, and other cultural factors within the design community. On the other hand, another reason for slow space travel application design is the high energy cost, and low efficiency, for achieving orbit. This cost might be seen as too high a "start-up cost."

== Areas of engineering involved ==
Spacecraft design brings together aspects of various disciplines, namely:

- Astronautics for mission design and derivation of the design requirements,
- Systems engineering for maintaining the design baseline and derivation of subsystem requirements,
- Communications engineering for the design of the subsystems that communicate with the ground (e.g. telemetry) and perform ranging.
- Computer engineering for the design of the on-board computers and computer buses. This subsystem is mainly based on terrestrial technologies, but unlike most of them, it must: cope with the space environment, be highly autonomous, and provide higher fault tolerance.
  - It may incorporate space qualified radiation-hardened components.
- Software engineering for the on-board software which runs all the on-board applications, as well as low-level control software. This subsystem is very similar to terrestrial real-time and embedded software designs,
- Electrical engineering for the design of the power subsystem, which generates, stores, and distributes the electrical power to all the on-board equipment,
- Control theory for the design of the attitude and orbit control subsystem, which points the spacecraft correctly, and maintains or changes the orbit according to the mission profile; the hardware used for actuation and sensing in space is usually very specific to spacecraft,
- Thermal engineering for the design of the thermal control subsystem (including radiators, iinsulation, ad heaters), which maintains environmental conditions compatible with operations of the spacecraft equipment; This subsystem has very space-specific technologies, since in space, radiation and conduction usually dominate as thermal effects, by opposition with Earth where convection is typically the main one,
- Propulsion engineering for the design of the propulsion subsystem, which provides a means of transporting the spacecraft from one orbit to another,
- Mechanical engineering for the design of the spacecraft structures and mechanisms, as well as the selection of materials for use in vacuum. These include beams, panels, and deployable appendages or separation devices (to separate from the launch vehicle).

== Spacecraft Subsystems ==
=== Structure ===
The spacecraft bus carries the payload. Its subsystems support the payload and help in pointing the payload correctly. It puts the payload in the right orbit and keeps it there. It provides housekeeping functions. It also provides orbit and attitude maintenance, electric power, command, telemetry, and data handling, structure and rigidity, temperature control, data storage, and communication, if required. The payload and spacecraft bus may be different units or it may be a combined one. The booster adapter provides the load-carrying interface with the vehicle (payload and spacecraft bus together).

The spacecraft may also have a propellant load, which is used to drive or push the vehicle upwards, and a propulsion kick stage. The propellant commonly used is a compressed gas like nitrogen, a quid a such as monopropellant hydrazine or solid fuel, which is used for velocity corrections and attitude control. In a kick stage (also called apogee boost motor, propulsion module, or integral propulsion stage) a separate rocket motor is used to send the spacecraft into its mission orbit. While designing a spacecraft, the orbit which is going to be used should be considered into thnt as it affects attitude control, thermal design, and the electric power subsystem. But these effects are secondary as compared to the effect caused on the payload due to the orbit. Thus while designing the mission; the designer selects such an orbit which increases the payload performance. The designer even calculates the required spacecraft performance characteristics such as pointing, thermal control, power quantity, and duty cycle. The spacecraft is then made, which satisfies all the requirements.

=== Attitude determination and control ===
The attitude determination and control subsystem (ADCS) is used to stabilize (detumbling) or change the attitude (orientation) of the spacecraft. There are some external torques acting on the spacecraft along the axis passing through its center of gravity which can reorient the spacecraft in any direction or can give it a spin. The ADCS nullifies these torques by applying equal and opposite torques using the proion and navigation. Moment of inertia of the body is to be calculated to determine the external torques which also requires determination of vehicle's absolute attitude using sensors. The property called 'gyroscopic stiffness' is used to reduce the spinning effect. The simplest spacecraft achieve control by spinning or interacting with the Earth's magnetic or gravity fields. Sometimes they are uncontrolled. Spacecraft may have several bodies or they are attached to important parts, such as solar arrays or communication antennas which need individual attitude pointing. For controlling the appendage's attitude, actuators are often used, with separate sensors and controllers. The various types of control techniques used are:

- Passive Control Techniques.
- Spin Control Techniques.
- Three-axis Control Techniques.

=== Telemetry, tracking, and command ===
Telemetry, tracking, and command (TT&C) is used for communication between spacecraft and the ground systems. The subsystem functions are:

- Controlling of spacecraft by the operator on Earth
- Receive the uplink commands, process and send them to other subsystems for implication.
- Receive the downlink commands from subsystems, process and transmit them to Earth.
- Inform constantly about the spacecraft position.

=== Communication ===
The process of sending information towards the spacecraft is called uplink or forward link and the opposite process is called downlink or return link. Uplink consists of commands and ranging tones where as downlink consists of status telemetry, ranging tones and even may include payload data. Receiver, transmitter and a wide-angle (hemispheric or omnidirectional) antenna are the main components of a basic communication subsystem. Systems with high data rates may even use a directional antenna, if required. The subsystem can provide us with the coherence between uplink and downlink signals, with the help of which we can measure range-rate Doppler shifts. The communication subsystem is sized by data rate, allowable error rate, communication path length, and RF frequency.

The vast majority of spacecraft communicate using radio antennas -- satellite communication. A few spacecraft communicate using lasers—either directly to the ground as with LADEE; or between satellites as with OICETS, Artemis, Alphabus, and the European Data Relay System.

=== Power ===
The electrical power subsystem (EPS) consists of 4 subunits :

- Power Source (Battery, solar cell, fuelcells, thermoelectric couple)
- Storage unit (No. of batteries in series)
- Power Distribution (Cabling, switching, shock protection)
- Power Regulation and Control (To prevent battery overcharging and overheating)

=== Thermal ===
Thermal control subsystem (TCS) is used to maintain the temperature of all spacecraft components within certain limits. Both upper and lower limits are defined for each component. There are two limits, namely, operational (in working conditions) and survival (in non-working conditions). Temperature is controlled by using insulators, radiators, heaters, louvers and by giving proper surface finish to components.

=== Propulsion ===
The main function of the propulsion subsystem is to provide thrust so as to change the spacecraft's translational velocity or to apply torques to change its angular momentum. There is no requirement of thrust and hence even no requirement of propulsion equipment in a simplest spacecraft. But many of them need a controlled thrust in their system, so their design includes some form of metered propulsion (a propulsion system that can be turned on and off in small increments). Thrusting is used for the following purposes: for changing the orbital parameters, to control attitude during thrusting, correct velocity errors, maneuver, counter disturbance forces (e.g., drag), and control and correct angular momentum. The propulsion subsystem includes a propellant, tankage, distribution system, pressurant, and propellant controls. It also includes thrusters or engines.

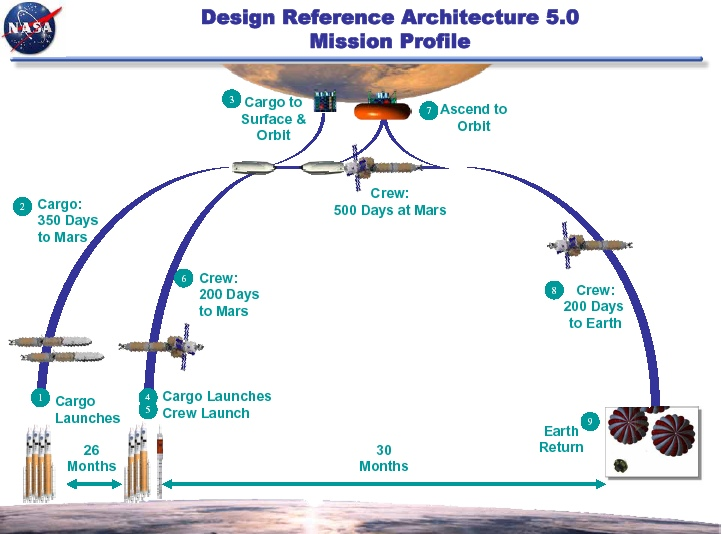
An example architecture from the mid-2010s of a human spaceflight mission to Mars, as envisioned by the United States space agency, NASA.

== Requirements ==
Spacecraft design is always informed by the particular architecture of the mission under consideration. Typically, a variety of mission architectures can be envisioned that would achieve the overall objective of the flight, whether those objectives be to gather scientific data or merely transport cargo across the space environment to serve any variety of purposes, governmental or economic.

Spaceflight mission architectures will specify whether a spacecraft is to be autonomous or controlled from the ground, or even be crewed so as to deal with particular exigencies or goals of the mission. Other considerations include fast or slow trajectories, payload makeup and capacity, length of the mission, or the level of system redundancy so that the flight can achieve various degrees of fault-tolerance.
