= Spacecraft =

Vehicle or machine designed to fly in space

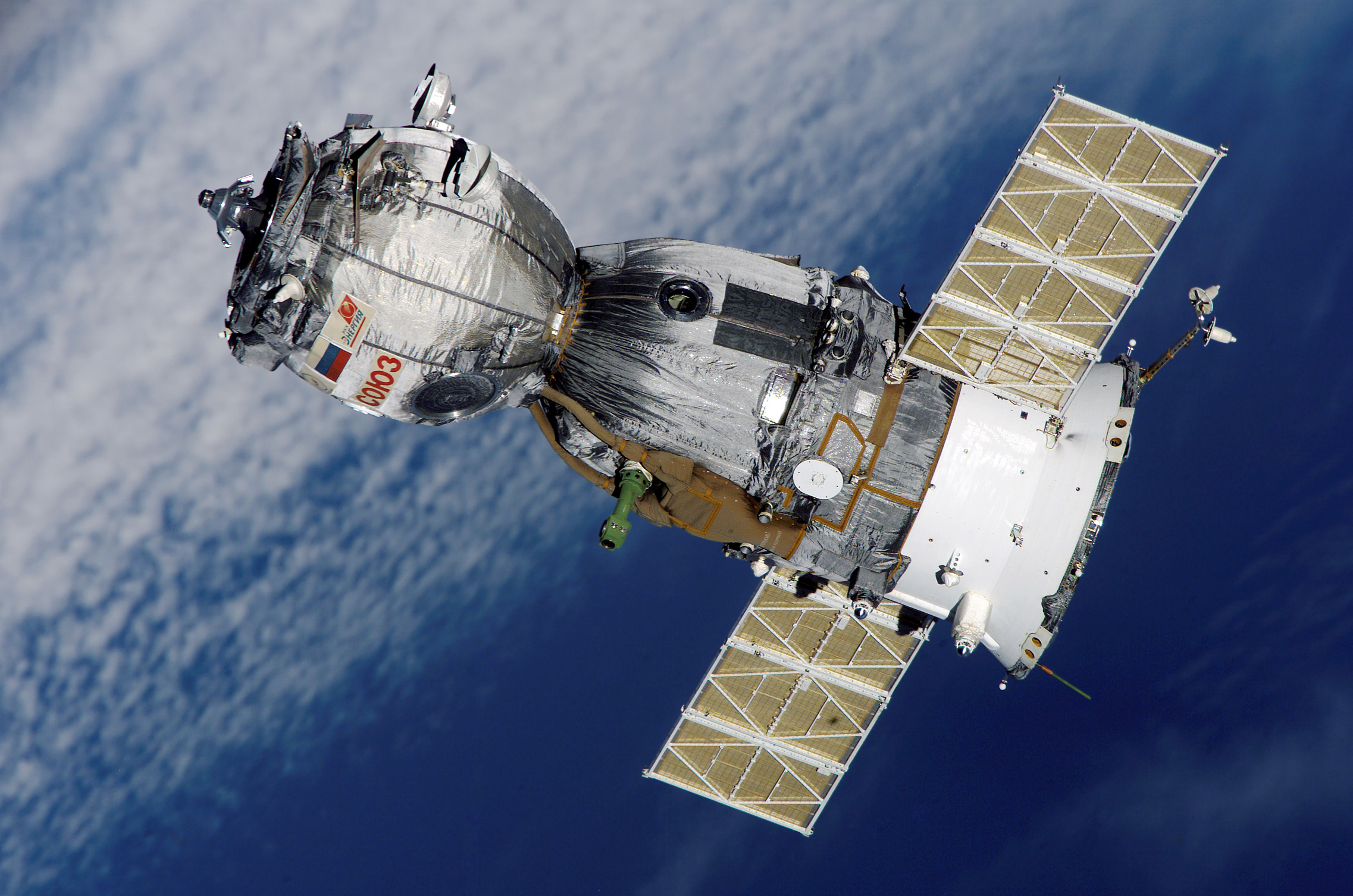
More than 140 Soviet and Russian crewed Soyuz spacecraft (TMA version shown) have flown since 1967 and now support the International Space Station.

A spacecraft is a vehicle that is designed to fly and operate in outer space. Spacecraft are used for a variety of purposes, including communications, Earth observation, meteorology, navigation, space colonization, planetary exploration, and transportation of humans and cargo. All spacecraft except single-stage-to-orbit vehicles cannot get into space on their own, and require a launch vehicle (carrier rocket).

On a sub-orbital spaceflight, a space vehicle enters space and then returns to the surface without having gained sufficient energy or velocity to make a full Earth orbit. For orbital spaceflights, spacecraft enter closed orbits around the Earth or around other celestial bodies. Spacecraft used for human spaceflight carry people on board as crew or passengers from start or on orbit (space stations) only, whereas those used for robotic space missions operate either autonomously or telerobotically. Robotic spacecraft used to support scientific research are space probes. Robotic spacecraft that remain in orbit around a planetary body are artificial satellites. To date, only a handful of interstellar probes, such as Pioneer 10 and 11, Voyager 1 and 2, and New Horizons, are on trajectories that leave the Solar System.

Orbital spacecraft may be recoverable or not. Most are not. Recoverable spacecraft may be subdivided by a method of reentry to Earth into non-winged space capsules and winged spaceplanes. Recoverable spacecraft may be reusable (can be launched again or several times, like the SpaceX Dragon and the Space Shuttle orbiters) or expendable (like the Soyuz or Orion). In recent years, more space agencies are tending towards reusable spacecraft.

Humanity has achieved space flight, but only a few nations have the technology for orbital launches: Russia (Roscosmos), the United States (NASA), the member states of the European Space Agency, Japan (JAXA), China (CNSA), India (ISRO), Israel (ISA), Iran (ISA), and North Korea (NATA). In addition, several private companies have developed or are developing the technology for orbital launches independently from government agencies. Two prominent examples of such companies are SpaceX and Blue Origin.

== History ==
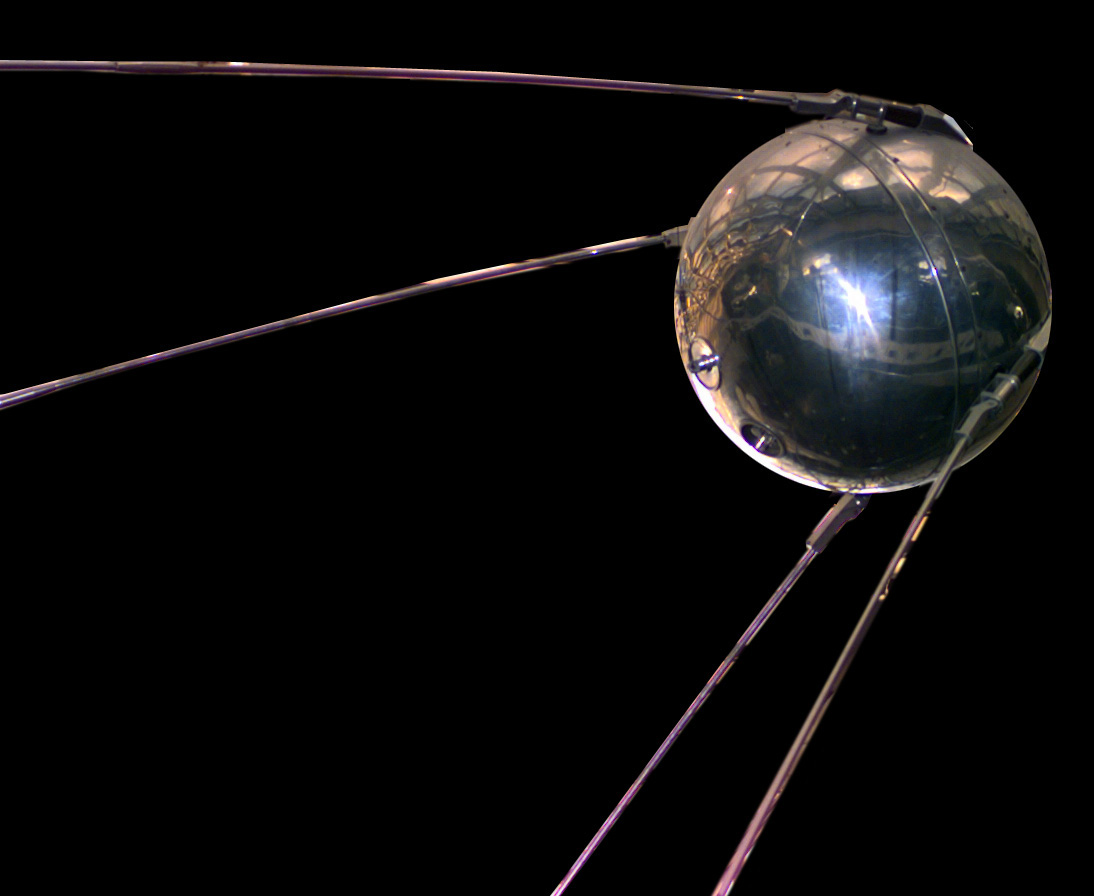
The first artificial satellite, Sputnik 1, launched by the Soviet Union

A German V-2, co-designed by Wernher von Braun, became the first spacecraft when it reached an altitude of 189 km in June 1944 in Peenemünde, Germany. Sputnik 1 was the first artificial satellite. It was launched into an elliptical low Earth orbit (LEO) by the Soviet Union on 4 October 1957. The launch ushered in new political, military, technological, and scientific developments; while the Sputnik launch was a single event, it marked the start of the Space Age. Apart from its value as a technological first, Sputnik 1 also helped to identify the upper atmospheric layer's density, by measuring the satellite's orbital changes. It also provided data on radio-signal distribution in the ionosphere. Pressurized nitrogen in the satellite's false body provided the first opportunity for meteoroid detection. Sputnik 1 was launched during the International Geophysical Year from Site No.1/5, at the 5th Tyuratam range, in Kazakh SSR (now at the Baikonur Cosmodrome). The satellite travelled at 29,000 kilometres per hour (18,000 mph), taking 96.2 minutes to complete an orbit, and emitted radio signals at 20.005 and 40.002 MHz

While Sputnik 1 was the first spacecraft to orbit the Earth, other human-made objects had previously reached an altitude of 100 km, which is the height required by the international organization Fédération Aéronautique Internationale to count as a spaceflight. This altitude is called the Kármán line. In particular, in the 1940s there were several test launches of the V-2 rocket, some of which reached altitudes well over 100 km.

== Crewed and uncrewed spacecraft ==
=== Crewed spacecraft ===
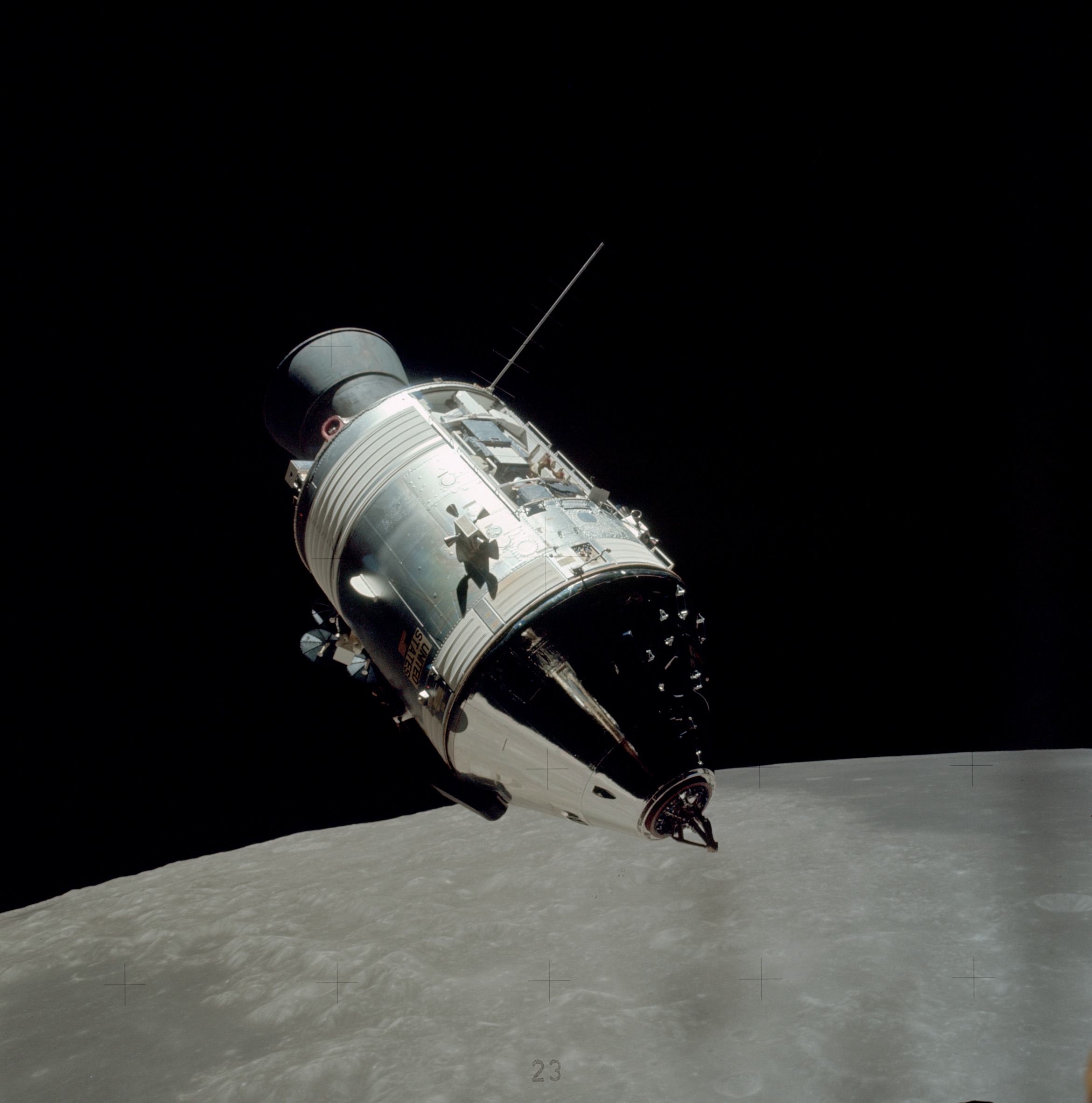
Apollo 17 Command Module America in lunar orbit

As of 2026, only three nations have flown crewed spacecraft: USSR/Russia, USA, and China. The first crewed spacecraft was Vostok 1, which carried Soviet cosmonaut Yuri Gagarin into space in 1961, and completed a full Earth orbit. There were five other crewed missions which used a Vostok spacecraft. The second crewed spacecraft was named Freedom 7, and it performed a sub-orbital spaceflight in 1961 carrying American astronaut Alan Shepard to an altitude of just over 187 kilometers (116 mi). There were five other crewed missions using Mercury spacecraft.

Other Soviet crewed spacecraft include the Voskhod, Soyuz, flown uncrewed as Zond/L1, L3, TKS, and the Salyut and Mir crewed space stations. Other American crewed spacecraft include the Gemini spacecraft, the Apollo spacecraft including the Apollo Lunar Module, the Skylab space station, the Space Shuttle with undetached European Spacelab and private US Spacehab space stations-modules, and the SpaceX Crew Dragon configuration of their Dragon 2. US company Boeing also developed and flown a spacecraft of their own, the CST-100, commonly referred to as Starliner, but a crewed flight is yet to occur. China developed, but did not fly Shuguang, and is currently using Shenzhou (its first crewed mission was in 2003).

Except for the Space Shuttle and the Buran spaceplane of the Soviet Union, the latter of which only ever had one uncrewed test flight, all of the recoverable crewed orbital spacecraft were space capsules.

Crewed spacecraft

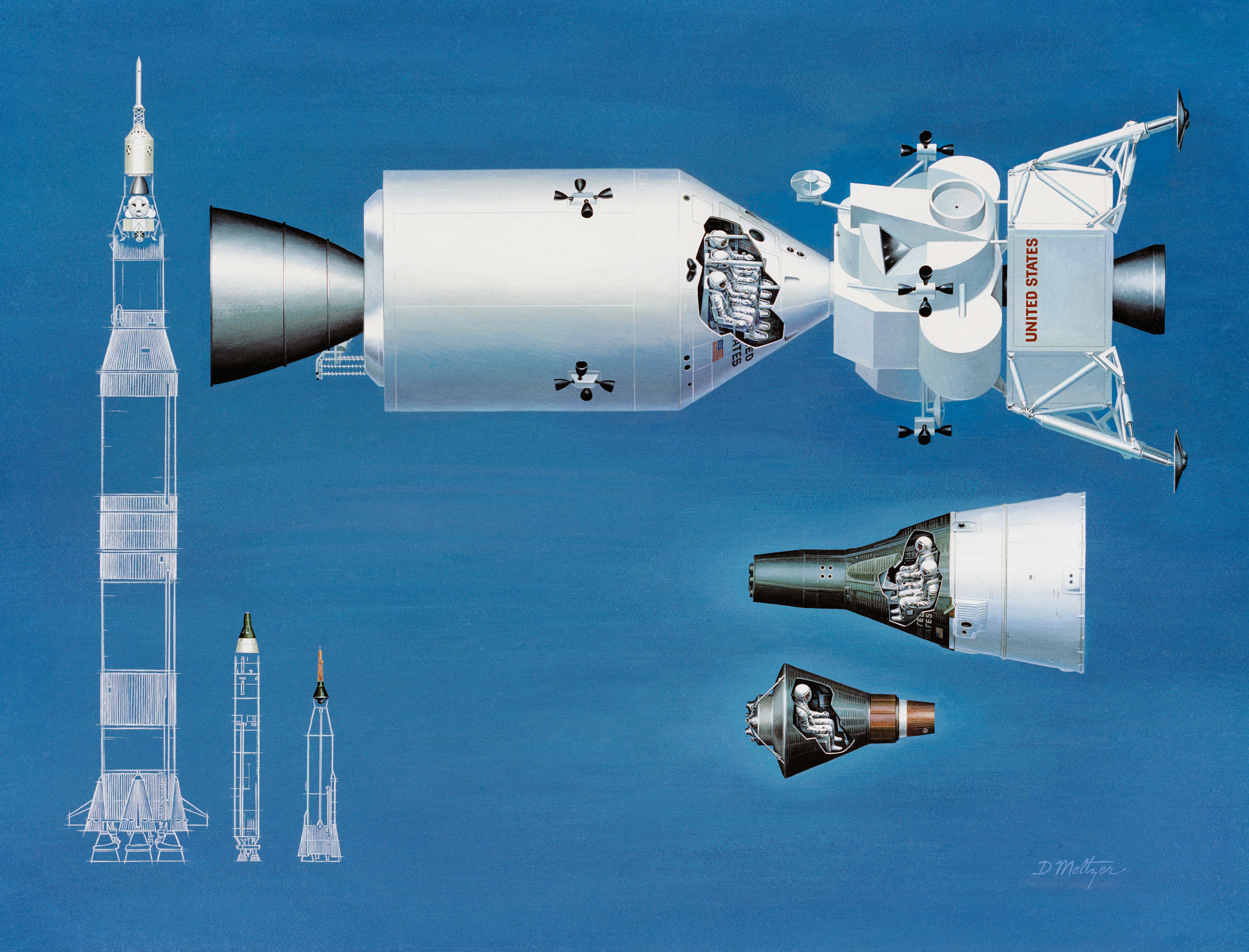
American Mercury, Gemini, and Apollo spacecraft

Soviet Vostok capsule

Soviet Voskhod (variant of Vostok)

1967 Soviet/Russian Soyuz spacecraft

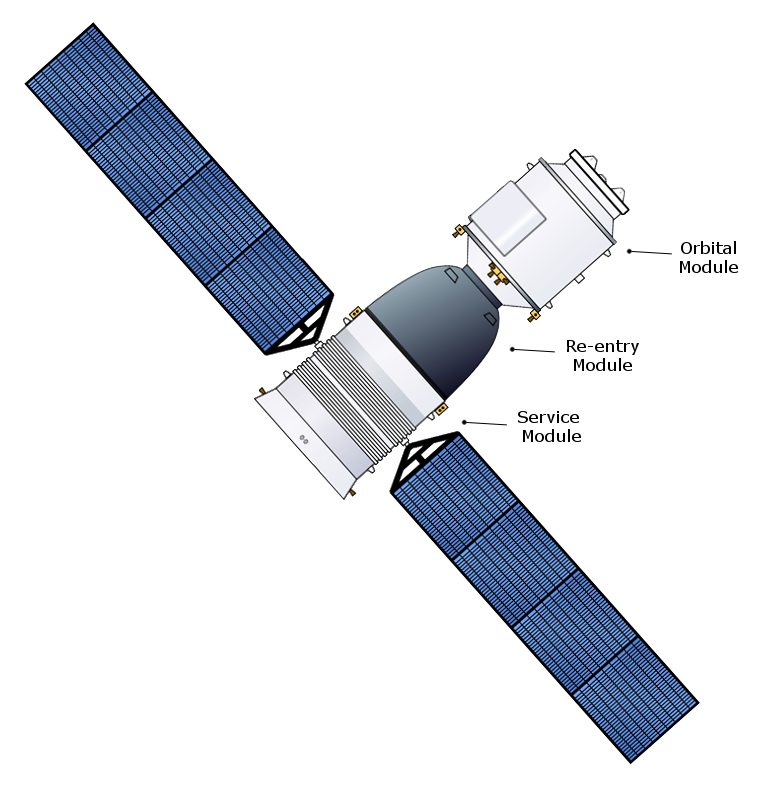
Chinese Shenzhou spacecraft

The International Space Station, crewed since November 2000, is a joint venture between Russia, the United States, Canada and several other countries.

=== Uncrewed spacecraft ===
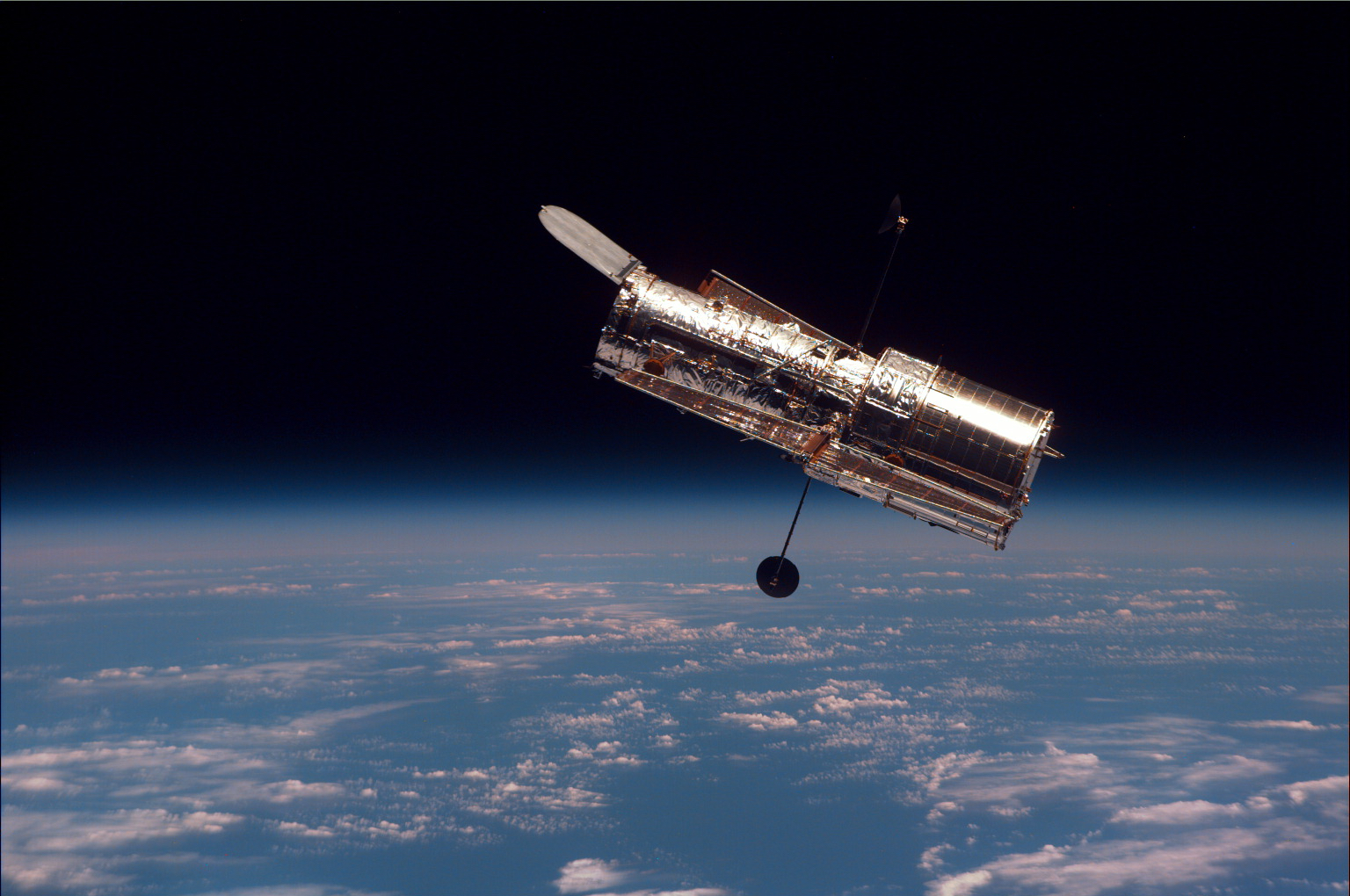
Hubble Space Telescope

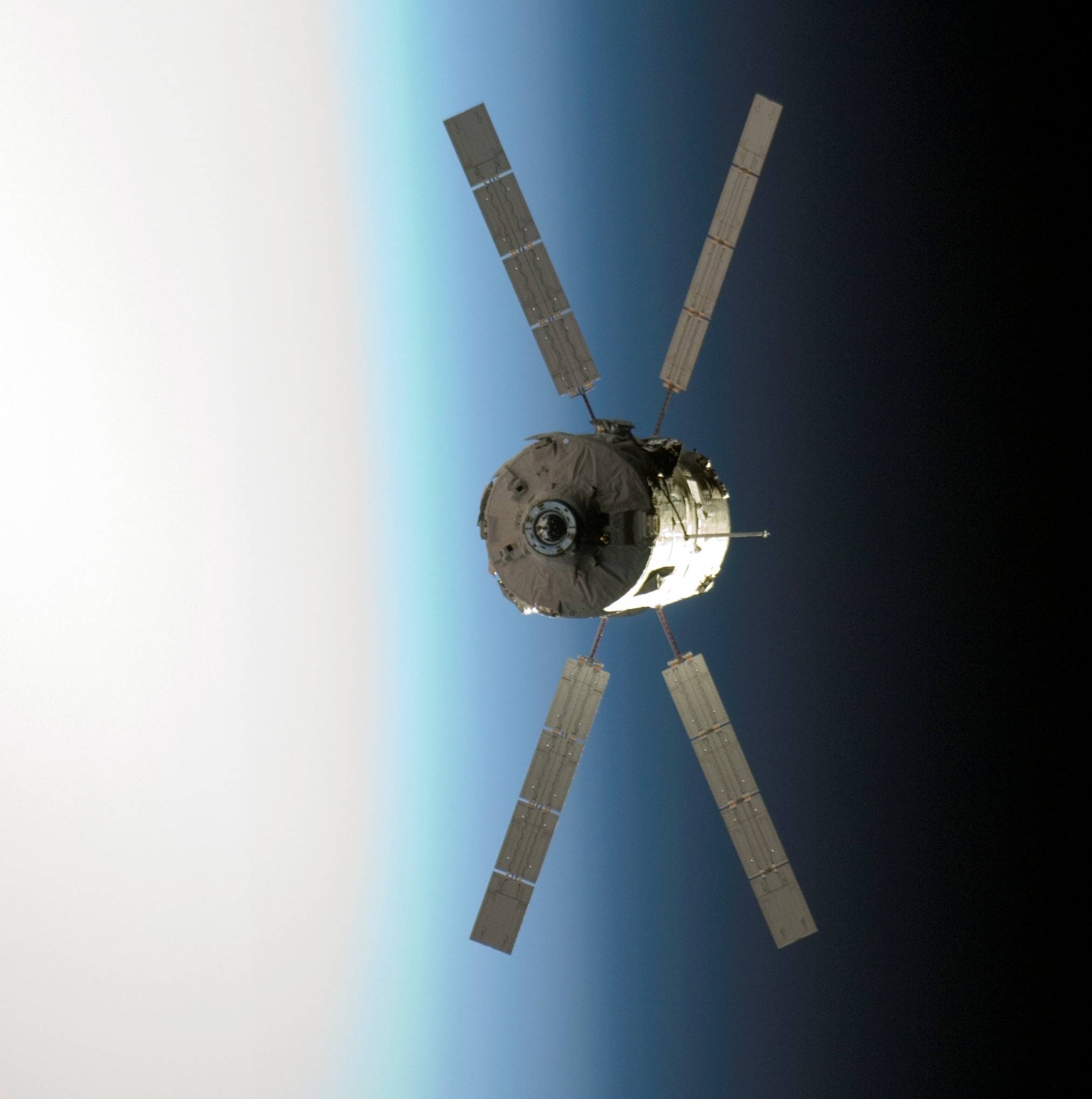
Jules Verne Automated Transfer Vehicle (ATV) approaches the International Space Station on Monday, March 31, 2008.

Uncrewed spacecraft are spacecraft without people on board. Uncrewed spacecraft may have varying levels of autonomy from human input; they may be remote controlled, remote guided or even autonomous, meaning they have a pre-programmed list of operations, which they will execute unless otherwise instructed.

Many space missions are more suited to telerobotic rather than crewed operation, due to lower cost and lower risk factors. In addition, some planetary destinations such as Venus or the vicinity of Jupiter are too hostile for human survival. Outer planets such as Saturn, Uranus, and Neptune are too distant to reach with current crewed spaceflight technology, so telerobotic probes are the only way to explore them. Telerobotics also allows exploration of regions that are vulnerable to contamination by Earth micro-organisms since spacecraft can be sterilized. Humans can not be sterilized in the same way as a spaceship, as they coexist with numerous micro-organisms, and these micro-organisms are also hard to contain within a spaceship or spacesuit. Multiple space probes were sent to study Moon, the planets, the Sun, multiple small Solar System bodies (comets and asteroids).

Special class of uncrewed spacecraft is space telescopes, a telescope in outer space used to observe astronomical objects. The first operational telescopes were the American Orbiting Astronomical Observatory, OAO-2 launched in 1968, and the Soviet Orion 1 ultraviolet telescope aboard space station Salyut 1 in 1971. Space telescopes avoid the filtering and distortion (scintillation) of electromagnetic radiation which they observe, and avoid light pollution which ground-based observatories encounter. The best-known examples are Hubble Space Telescope and James Webb Space Telescope.

Cargo spacecraft are designed to carry cargo, possibly to support space stations' operation by transporting food, propellant and other supplies. Automated cargo spacecraft have been used since 1978 and have serviced Salyut 6, Salyut 7, Mir, the International Space Station and Tiangong space station.

=== Other ===
Some spacecraft can operate as both a crewed and uncrewed spacecraft. For example, the Buran spaceplane could operate autonomously but also had manual controls, though it never flew with crew onboard.

Other dual crewed/uncrewed spacecraft include: SpaceX Dragon 2, Dream Chaser, and Tianzhou.

== Types of spacecraft ==
=== Communications satellite ===
A communications satellite is an artificial satellite that relays and amplifies radio telecommunication signals via a transponder; it creates a communication channel between a source transmitter and a receiver at different locations on Earth. Communications satellites are used for television, telephone, radio, internet, and military applications. Many communications satellites are in geostationary orbit 22,300 miles (35,900 km) above the equator, so that the satellite appears stationary at the same point in the sky; therefore the satellite dish antennas of ground stations can be aimed permanently at that spot and do not have to move to track the satellite. Others form satellite constellations in low Earth orbit, where antennas on the ground have to follow the position of the satellites and switch between satellites frequently.

The high frequency radio waves used for telecommunications links travel by line of sight and so are obstructed by the curve of the Earth. The purpose of communications satellites is to relay the signal around the curve of the Earth allowing communication between widely separated geographical points. Communications satellites use a wide range of radio and microwave frequencies. To avoid signal interference, international organizations have regulations for which frequency ranges or "bands" certain organizations are allowed to use. This allocation of bands minimizes the risk of signal interference.

=== Cargo spacecraft ===
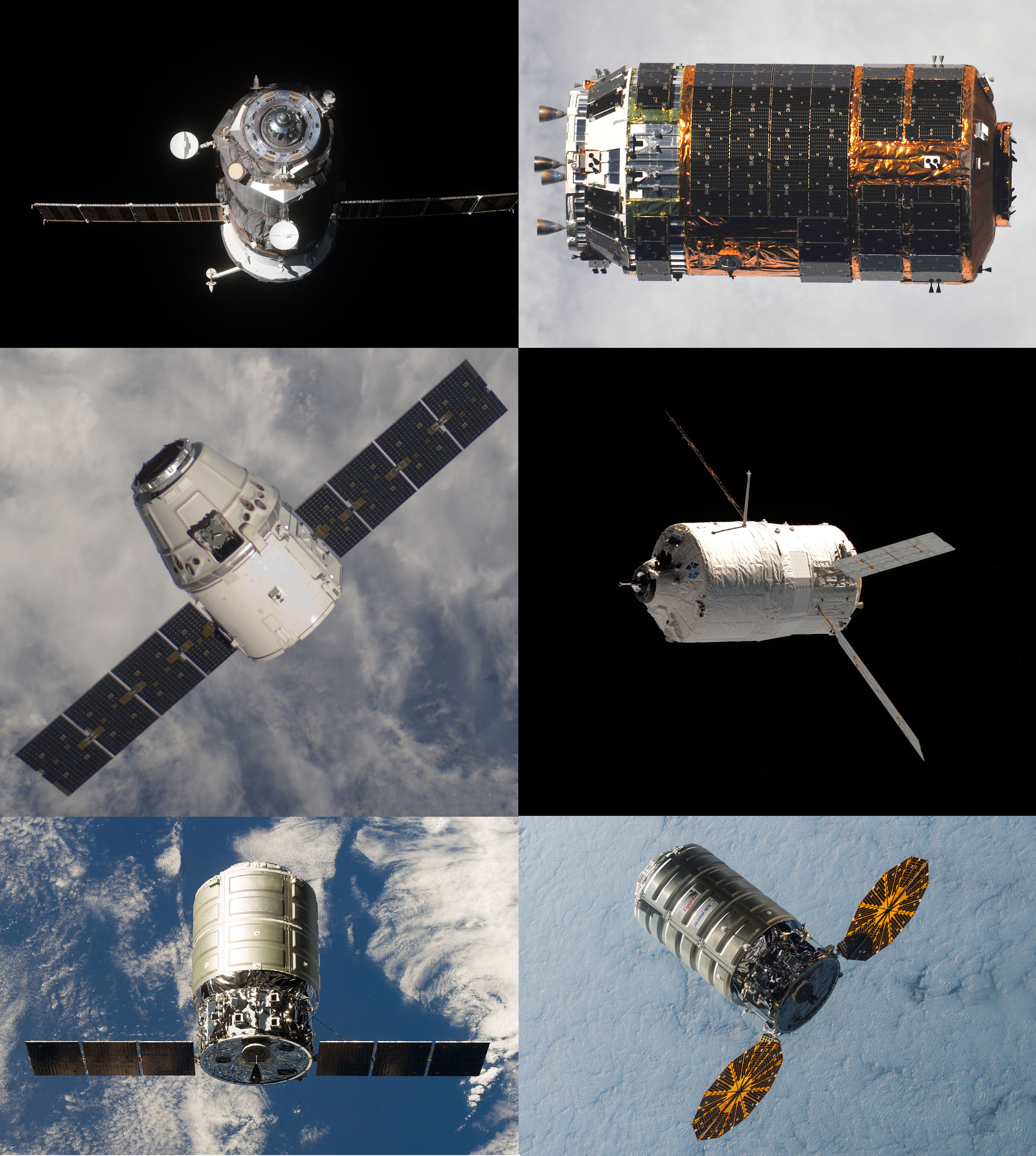
A collage of automated cargo spacecraft used in the past or present to resupply the International Space Station

Cargo or resupply spacecraft are robotic spacecraft that are designed specifically to carry cargo, possibly to support space stations' operation by transporting food, propellant and other supplies.

Automated cargo spacecraft have been used since 1978 and have serviced Salyut 6, Salyut 7, Mir, the International Space Station and Tiangong space station.

As of 2026, three different cargo spacecraft are used to supply the International Space Station: Russian Progress, American SpaceX Dragon 2 and Cygnus. Chinese Tianzhou is used to supply Tiangong space station.

=== Space probes ===
Space probes are robotic spacecraft that are sent to explore deep space, or astronomical bodies other than Earth. They are distinguished from landers by the fact that they work in open space, not on planetary surfaces or in planetary atmospheres. Being robotic eliminates the need for expensive, heavy life-support systems (the Apollo crewed Moon landings required the use of the Saturn V rocket that cost over a billion dollars per launch, adjusted for inflation) and so allows for lighter, less expensive rockets. Space probes have visited every planet in the Solar System and Pluto, and the Parker Solar Probe has an orbit that, at its closest point, is in the Sun's chromosphere. There are five space probes that are escaping the Solar System, these are Voyager 1, Voyager 2, Pioneer 10, Pioneer 11, and New Horizons.

==== Voyager program ====
The identical Voyager probes, weighing 721.9 kilograms (1,592 lb), were launched in 1977 to take advantage of a rare alignment of Jupiter, Saturn, Uranus and Neptune that would allow a spacecraft to visit all four planets in one mission, and get to each destination faster by using gravity assist. In fact, the rocket that launched the probes (the Titan IIIE) could not even send the probes to the orbit of Saturn, yet Voyager 1 is travelling at roughly 17 km/s (11 mi/s) and Voyager 2 moves at about 15 km/s (9.3 mi/s) kilometres per second as of 2026. In 2012, Voyager 1 exited the heliosphere, followed by Voyager 2 in 2018. Voyager 1 actually launched 16 days after Voyager 2 but it reached Jupiter sooner because Voyager 2 was taking a longer route that allowed it to visit Uranus and Neptune, whereas Voyager 1 did not visit Uranus or Neptune, instead choosing to fly past Saturn’s satellite Titan. As of August 2026, Voyager 1 has passed 170 astronomical units, which means it is over 170 times farther from the Sun than Earth is. This makes it the farthest spacecraft from the Sun. Voyager 2 is 142 AU away from the Sun as of August 2026. NASA provides real time data of their distances and data from the probe’s cosmic ray detectors. Because of the probe’s declining power output and degradation of the RTGs over time, NASA has had to shut down certain instruments to conserve power. The probes may still have some scientific instruments on until the 2030s. After 2036, they will both be out of range of the Deep Space Network.

=== Space telescopes ===
A space telescope or space observatory is a telescope in outer space used to observe astronomical objects. Space telescopes avoid the filtering and distortion of electromagnetic radiation which they observe, and avoid light pollution which ground-based observatories encounter. They are divided into two types: satellites which map the entire sky (astronomical survey), and satellites which focus on selected astronomical objects or parts of the sky and beyond. Space telescopes are distinct from Earth imaging satellites, which point toward Earth for satellite imaging, applied for weather analysis, espionage, and other types of information gathering.

=== Landers ===
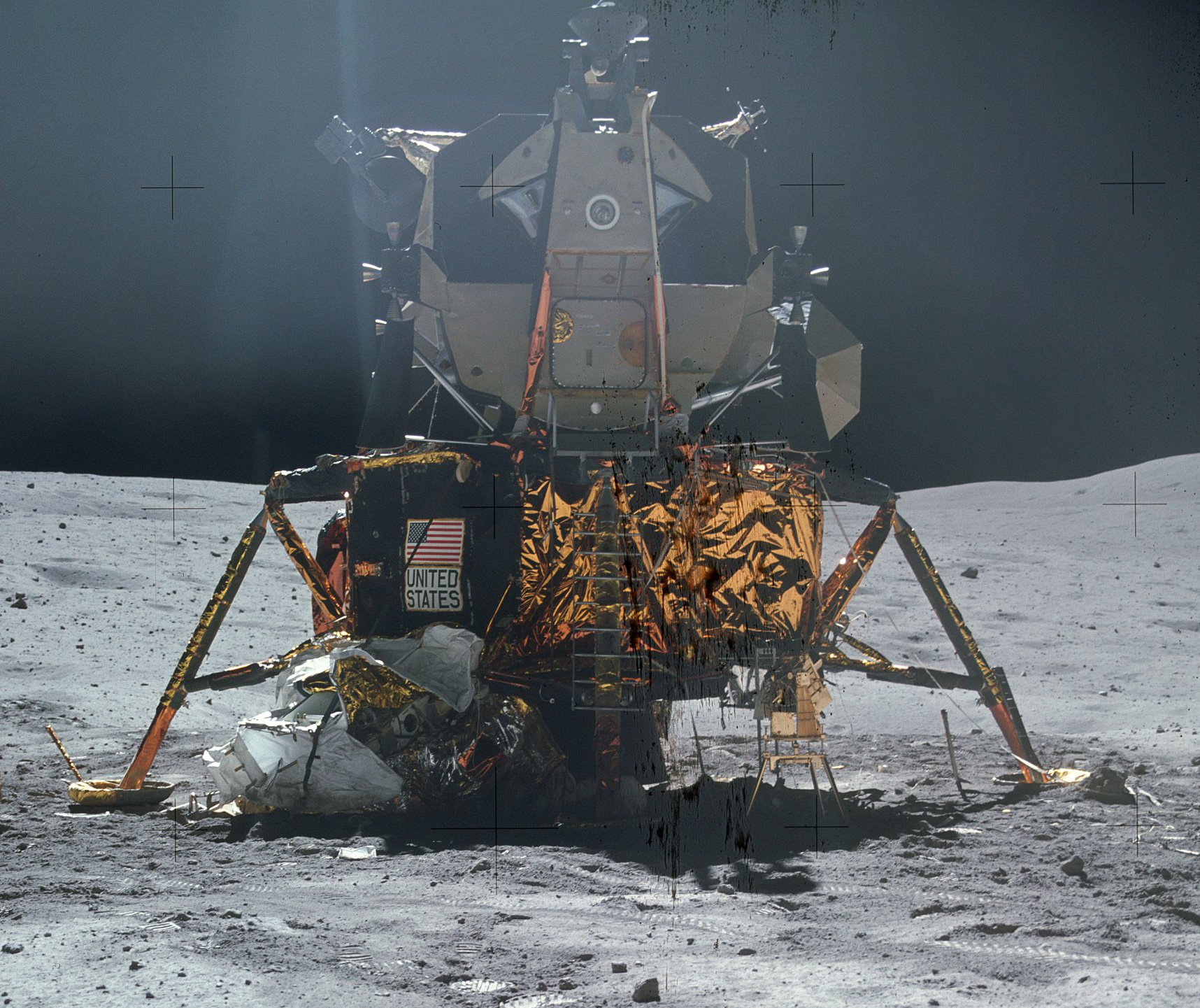
The Apollo 16 Extended Apollo Lunar Module, a lunar lander

A lander is a type of spacecraft that makes a soft landing on the surface of an astronomical body other than Earth. Some landers, such as Philae and the Apollo Lunar Module, land entirely by using their fuel supply, however many landers (and landings of spacecraft on Earth) use aerobraking, especially for more distant destinations. This involves the spacecraft using a fuel burn to change its trajectory so it will pass through a planet (or a moon's) atmosphere. Drag caused by the spacecraft hitting the atmosphere enables it to slow down without using fuel, however this generates very high temperatures and so adds a requirement for a heat shield of some sort.

=== Space capsules ===
Space capsules are a type of spacecraft that can return from space at least once. They have a blunt shape, do not usually contain much more fuel than needed, and they do not possess wings unlike spaceplanes. They are the simplest form of recoverable spacecraft, and so the most commonly used. The first such capsule was the Vostok capsule built by the Soviet Union, that carried the first person in space, Yuri Gagarin. Other examples include the Soyuz and Orion capsules, built by the Soviet Union and NASA, respectively.

=== Spaceplanes ===
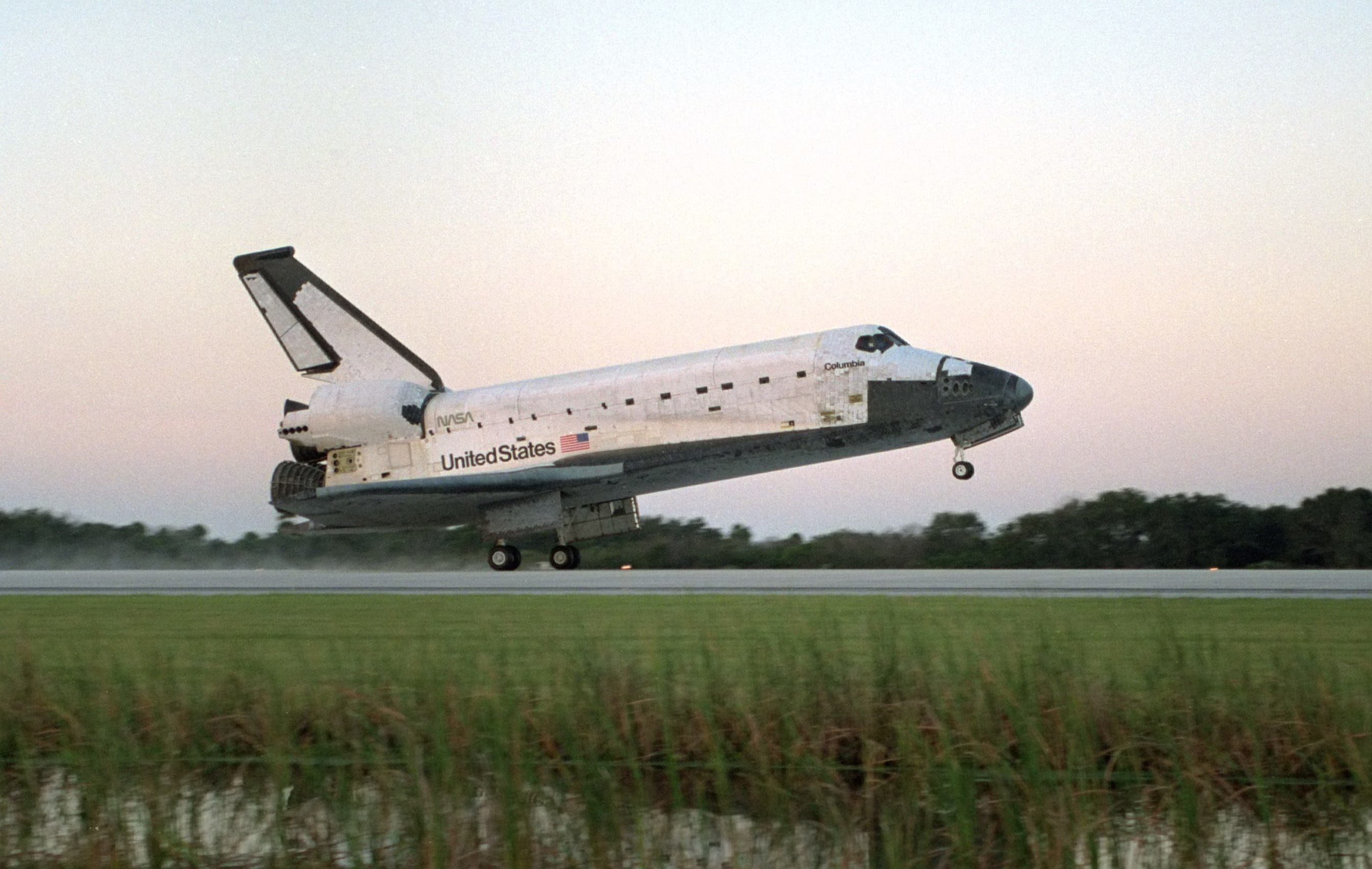
Columbia orbiter landing

Spaceplanes are spacecraft that are built in the shape of, and function as, airplanes. The first example of such was the North American X-15 spaceplane, which conducted two crewed flights which reached an altitude of over 100 kilometres (62 mi) in the 1960s. This first reusable spacecraft was air-launched on a suborbital trajectory on July 19, 1963.

The first reusable orbital space plane was the Space Shuttle orbiter. The first orbiter to fly in space, the Space Shuttle Columbia, was launched by the USA on the 20th anniversary of Yuri Gagarin's flight, on April 12, 1981. During the Shuttle era, six orbiters were built, all of which have flown in the atmosphere and five of which have flown in space. Enterprise was used only for approach and landing tests, launching from the back of a Boeing 747 SCA and gliding to deadstick landings at Edwards AFB, California. The first Space Shuttle to fly into space was Columbia, followed by Challenger, Discovery, Atlantis, and Endeavour. Endeavour was built to replace Challenger when it was lost in January 1986. Columbia broke up during reentry in February 2003.

The first autonomous reusable spaceplane was the Buran-class shuttle, launched by the USSR on November 15, 1988, although it made only one flight and this was uncrewed. This spaceplane was designed for a crew and strongly resembled the U.S. Space Shuttle, although its drop-off boosters used liquid propellants and its main engines were located at the base of what would be the external tank in the American Shuttle. Lack of funding, complicated by the dissolution of the USSR, prevented any further flights of Buran. The Space Shuttle was subsequently modified to allow for autonomous re-entry in case of necessity.

Per the Vision for Space Exploration, the Space Shuttle was retired in 2011 mainly due to its old age and high cost of program reaching over a billion dollars per flight. The Shuttle's human transport role is to be replaced by SpaceX's SpaceX Dragon 2 and Boeing's CST-100 Starliner. Dragon 2's first crewed flight occurred on May 30, 2020. The Shuttle's heavy cargo transport role is to be replaced by expendable rockets such as the Space Launch System and ULA's Vulcan rocket, as well as the commercial launch vehicles.

Scaled Composites' SpaceShipOne was a reusable suborbital spaceplane that carried pilots Mike Melvill and Brian Binnie on consecutive flights in 2004 to win the Ansari X Prize. The Spaceship Company built a successor SpaceShipTwo. A fleet of SpaceShipTwos operated by Virgin Galactic was planned to begin reusable private spaceflight carrying paying passengers in 2014, but was delayed after the crash of VSS Enterprise.

==== Space Shuttle ====
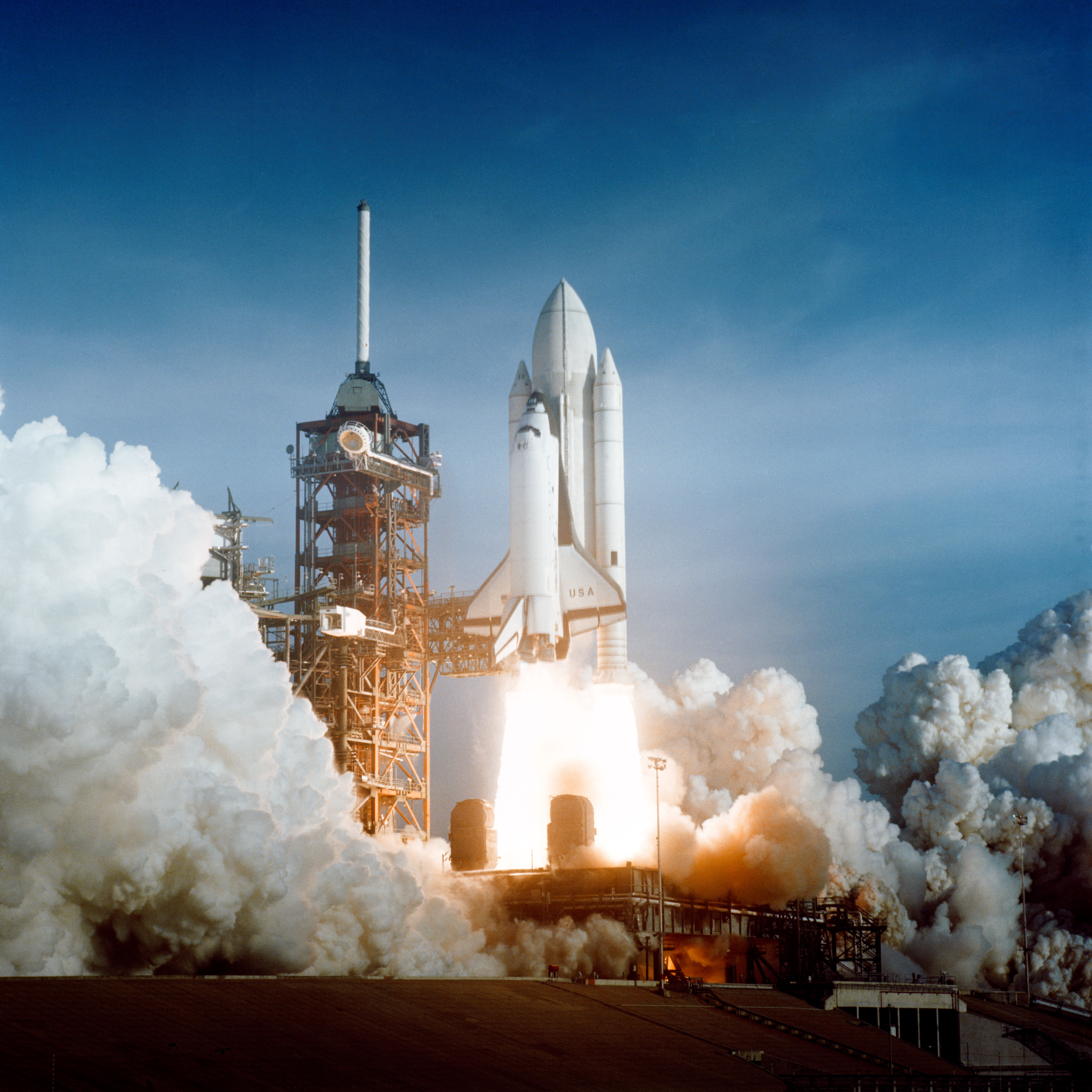
US Space Shuttle flew 135 times from 1981 to 2011, supporting Mir, the Hubble Space Telescope, and the International Space Station. (Columbia's maiden launch, which had a white external tank, shown)

The Space Shuttle is a retired reusable Low Earth Orbital launch system. It consisted of two reusable Solid Rocket Boosters that landed by parachute, were recovered at sea, and were the most powerful rocket motors ever made until they were superseded by those of NASA’s SLS rocket, with a liftoff thrust of 2,800,000 pounds-force (12 MN), which soon increased to 3,300,000 pounds-force (15 MN) per booster, and were fueled by a combination of PBAN and APCP, the Space Shuttle Orbiter, with 3 RS-25 engines that used a liquid oxygen/liquid hydrogen propellant combination, and the bright orange throwaway Space Shuttle external tank from which the RS-25 engines sourced their fuel. The orbiter was a spaceplane that was launched at NASA’s Kennedy Space Centre and landed mainly at the Shuttle Landing Facility, which is part of Kennedy Space Centre. A second launch site, Vandenberg Space Launch Complex 6 in California, was revamped so it could be used to launch the shuttles, but it was never used. The launch system could lift about 29 tonnes (64,000 lb) into an eastward Low Earth Orbit. Each orbiter weighed roughly 78 tonnes (172,000 lb), however the different orbiters had differing weights and thus payloads, with Columbia being the heaviest orbiter, Challenger being lighter than Columbia but still heavier than the other three. The orbiter structure was mostly composed of aluminium alloy. The orbiter had seven seats for crew members, though on STS-61-A the launch took place with 8 crew onboard. The orbiters had 4.6 metres (15 ft) wide by 18 metres (59 ft) long payload bays and also were equipped with a 15.2 metres (50 ft) CanadaArm1, an upgraded version of which is used on the International Space Station. The heat shield (or Thermal Protection System) of the orbiter, used to protect it from extreme levels of heat during atmospheric reentry and the cold of space, was made up of different materials depending on weight and how much heating a particular area on the shuttle would receive during reentry, which ranged from over 2,900 °F (1,600 °C) to under 700 °F (370 °C). The orbiter was manually operated, though an autonomous landing system was added while the shuttle was still on service. It had an in orbit maneouvreing system known as the Orbital Manoeuvring System, which used the hypergolic propellants monomethylhydrazine (MMH) and dinitrogen tetroxide, which was used for orbital insertion, changes to orbits and the deorbit burn.

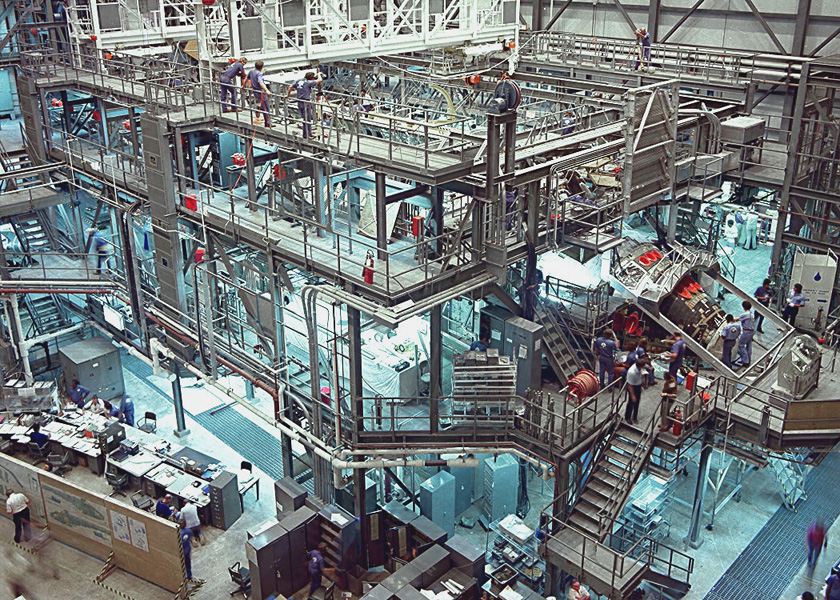
Refurbishing the orbiters and the solid rocket boosters after flight was very complex, expensive and slow. The shortest time between landing and reflight for a Space Shuttle was 54 days for the Space Shuttle Atlantis.

Though the shuttle’s goals were to drastically decrease launch costs, it did not do so, ending up being much more expensive than similar expendable launchers. This was due to expensive refurbishment costs and the external tank being expended. Once a landing had occurred, the SRBs and many parts of the orbiter had to be disassembled for inspection, which was long and arduous. Furthermore, the RS-25 engines had to be replaced every few flights. Each of the heat shielding tiles had to go in one specific area on the orbiter, increasing complexity more. Adding to this, the shuttle was a rather dangerous system, with fragile heat shielding tiles, some being so fragile that one could easily scrape it off by hand, often having been damaged in many flights. After 30 years in service from 1981 to 2011 and 135 flights, the shuttle was retired from service due to the cost of maintaining the shuttles, and the 3 remaining orbiters (the other two were destroyed in accidents) were prepared to be displayed in museums.

=== Other ===
Some spacecraft do not fit particularly well into any of the general spacecraft categories. This is a list of these spacecraft.

==== SpaceX Starship ====
Starship is a spacecraft and second stage under development by American aerospace company SpaceX. Stacked atop its booster, Super Heavy, it composes the identically named Starship super heavy-lift space vehicle. The spacecraft is designed to transport both crew and cargo to a variety of destinations, including Earth orbit, the Moon, Mars, and potentially beyond. It is intended to enable long duration interplanetary flights for a crew of up to 100 people. It will also be capable of point-to-point transport on Earth, enabling travel to anywhere in the world in less than an hour. Furthermore, the spacecraft will be used to refuel other Starship vehicles to allow them to reach higher orbits to and other space destinations. Elon Musk, the CEO of SpaceX, estimated in a tweet that 8 launches would be needed to completely refuel a Starship in low Earth orbit, extrapolating this from Starship's payload to orbit and how much fuel a fully fueled Starship contains. To land on bodies without an atmosphere, such as the Moon, Starship will fire its engines and thrusters to slow down.

==== Mission Extension Vehicle ====
The Mission Extension Vehicle is a robotic spacecraft designed to prolong the life on another spacecraft. It works by docking to its target spacecraft, then correcting its orientation or orbit. This also allows it to rescue a satellite which is in the wrong orbit by using its own fuel to move its target to the correct orbit. The project is currently managed by Northrop Grumman Innovation Systems. As of 2026, 2 have been launched. The first launched on a Proton rocket on 9 October 2019 and rendezvoused with Intelsat-901 on 25 February 2020. It remained with the satellite until 9 April 2025 before the satellite was moved to a final graveyard orbit, returning to geostationary orbit to perform a similar lifetime extension for Optus D3. The other spacecraft launched on an Ariane 5 rocket on 15 August 2020.

== Subsystems ==
A spacecraft astrionics system comprises different subsystems, depending on the mission profile. Spacecraft subsystems are mounted in the satellite bus and may include attitude determination and control (variously called ADAC, ADC, or ACS), guidance, navigation and control (GNC or GN&C), communications (comms), command and data handling (CDH or C&DH), power (EPS), thermal control (TCS), propulsion, and structures. Attached to the bus are typically payloads.

Life support
Spacecraft intended for human spaceflight must also include a life-support system for the crew.

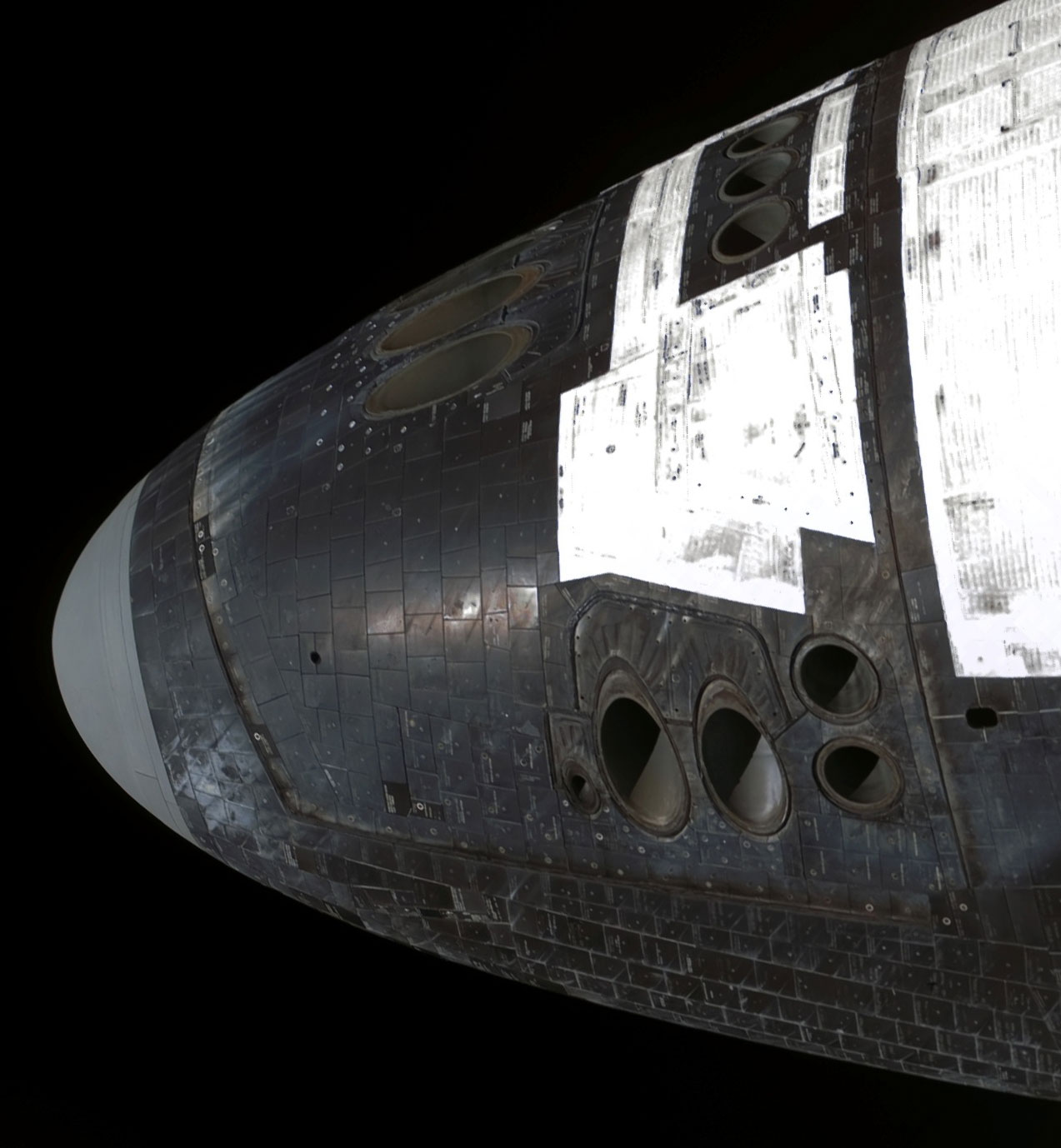
Reaction control system thrusters on the front of the U.S. Space Shuttle

Attitude control
A spacecraft needs an attitude control subsystem to detumble, be correctly oriented in space and respond to external torques and forces properly. This may use reaction wheels or it may use small rocket thrusters. The attitude control subsystem consists of sensors and actuators, together with controlling algorithms. The attitude control subsystem permits proper pointing for the science objective, sun pointing for power to the solar arrays and Earth pointing for communications.

GNC
Guidance refers to the calculation of the commands (usually done by the CDH subsystem) needed to steer the spacecraft where it is desired to be. Navigation means determining a spacecraft's orbital elements or position. Control means adjusting the path of the spacecraft to meet mission requirements, typically using manoeuvres determined by trajectory optimization.

Command and data handling
The C&DH subsystem receives commands from the communications subsystem, performs validation and decoding of the commands, and distributes the commands to the appropriate spacecraft subsystems and components. The CDH also receives housekeeping data and science data from the other spacecraft subsystems and components, and packages the data for storage on a data recorder or transmission to the ground via the communications subsystem. Other functions of the CDH include maintaining the spacecraft clock and state-of-health monitoring.

Communications
Spacecraft, both robotic and crewed, have various communications systems for communication with terrestrial stations and for inter-satellite service. Technologies include space radio station and optical communication. In addition, some spacecraft payloads are explicitly for the purpose of ground–ground communication using receiver/retransmitter electronic technologies.

Power
Spacecraft need an electrical power generation and distribution subsystem for powering the various spacecraft subsystems. For spacecraft near the Sun, solar panels are frequently used to generate electrical power. Spacecraft designed to operate in more distant locations, for example Jupiter, might employ a radioisotope thermoelectric generator (RTG) to generate electrical power. Electrical power is sent through power conditioning equipment before it passes through a power distribution unit over an electrical bus to other spacecraft components. Batteries are typically connected to the bus via a battery charge regulator, and the batteries are used to provide electrical power during periods when primary power is not available, for example when a low Earth orbit spacecraft is eclipsed by Earth.

Thermal control
Spacecraft must be engineered to withstand transit through Earth's atmosphere and the space environment. They must operate in a vacuum with temperatures potentially ranging across hundreds of degrees Celsius as well as (if subject to reentry) in the presence of plasmas. Material requirements are such that either high melting temperature, low density materials such as beryllium and reinforced carbon–carbon or (possibly due to the lower thickness requirements despite its high density) tungsten or ablative carbon–carbon composites are used. Depending on mission profile, spacecraft may also need to operate on the surface of another planetary body. The thermal control subsystem can be passive, dependent on the selection of materials with specific radiative properties. Active thermal control makes use of electrical heaters and certain actuators such as louvers to control temperature ranges of equipments within specific ranges.

Spacecraft propulsion
Spacecraft may or may not have a propulsion subsystem, depending on whether or not the mission profile calls for propulsion. The Swift spacecraft is an example of a spacecraft that does not have a propulsion subsystem. Typically though, LEO spacecraft include a propulsion subsystem for altitude adjustments (drag make-up maneuvers) and inclination adjustment maneuvers. A propulsion system is also needed for spacecraft that perform momentum management maneuvers. Components of a conventional propulsion subsystem include fuel, tankage, valves, pipes, and thrusters. The thermal control system interfaces with the propulsion subsystem by monitoring the temperature of those components, and by preheating tanks and thrusters in preparation for a spacecraft maneuver.

Structures
Spacecraft must be engineered to withstand launch loads imparted by the launch vehicle, and must have a point of attachment for all the other subsystems. Depending on mission profile, the structural subsystem might need to withstand loads imparted by entry into the atmosphere of another planetary body, and landing on the surface of another planetary body.

Payload
The payload depends on the mission of the spacecraft, and is typically regarded as the part of the spacecraft "that pays the bills". Typical payloads could include scientific instruments (cameras, telescopes, or particle detectors, for example), cargo, or a human crew.

== Supporting logistics ==
Ground segment

The ground segment is vital to the operation of the spacecraft. Typical components of a ground segment in use during normal operations include a mission operations facility where the flight operations team conducts the operations of the spacecraft, a data processing and storage facility, ground stations to radiate signals to and receive signals from the spacecraft, and a voice and data communications network to connect all mission elements.

Launch vehicle
The launch vehicle propels the spacecraft from Earth's surface, through the atmosphere, and into an orbit, the exact orbit being dependent on the mission configuration. The launch vehicle may be expendable or reusable. In a single stage to orbit rocket, the rocket can be considered a spacecraft itself.

== Spacecraft records ==
=== Fastest spacecraft ===
- Parker Solar Probe (estimated 343,000 km/h or 213,000 mph at first sun close pass, will reach 700,000 km/h or 430,000 mph at final perihelion)
- Helios I and II Solar Probes (252,792 km/h or 157,078 mph)

=== Furthest spacecraft from the Sun ===
- Voyager 1 at 172.54 AU as of October 2026, traveling outward at about 3.57 AU/a (60,900 km/h; 37,900 mph)
- Voyager 2 at 144.22 AU as of October 2026, traveling outward at about 3.22 AU/a (55,000 km/h; 34,100 mph)
- Pioneer 10 at 141.53 AU as of October 2026, traveling outward at about 2.50 AU/a (42,700 km/h; 26,500 mph)
- Pioneer 11 at 118.15 AU as of October 2026, traveling outward at about 2.35 AU/a (40,100 km/h; 24,900 mph)

== See also ==
- Astrionics
- Commercial astronaut
- Flying saucer
- List of crewed spacecraft
- List of fictional spacecraft
- Private spaceflight
- Spacecraft design
- Space exploration
- Space launch
- Space suit
- List of spaceflight records
- Starship
- Timeline of Solar System exploration
- U.S. Space Exploration History on U.S. Stamps
