= NASCOM =

Terrestrial communications network operated by NASA

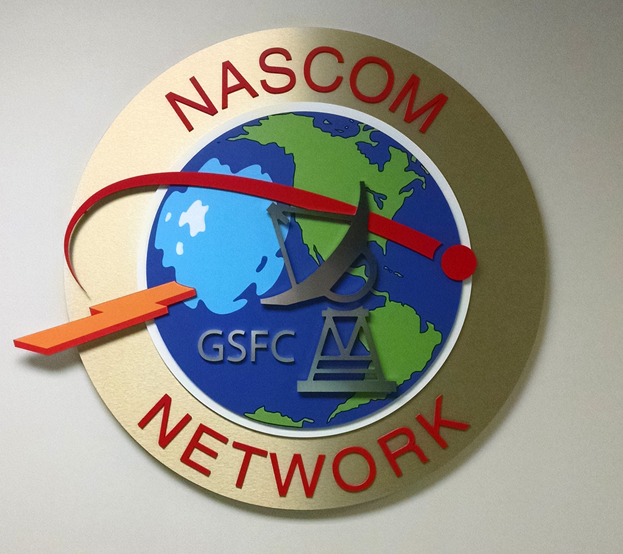
Logo of NASA Communications

The NASA (Ground) Communications System (NASCOM) manages terrestrial communications between ground stations, mission control centers, and other elements of spacecraft ground segments. Established in 1964, NASCOM provides worldwide, near real-time, transmission of commands, telemetry, voice, and television signals. It is managed out of NASA's Goddard Space Flight Center in Greenbelt, Maryland.

The NASCOM network comprises microwave links, undersea communications cables, land lines, and network centers at Goddard and around the world.

== History ==
=== Early development ===
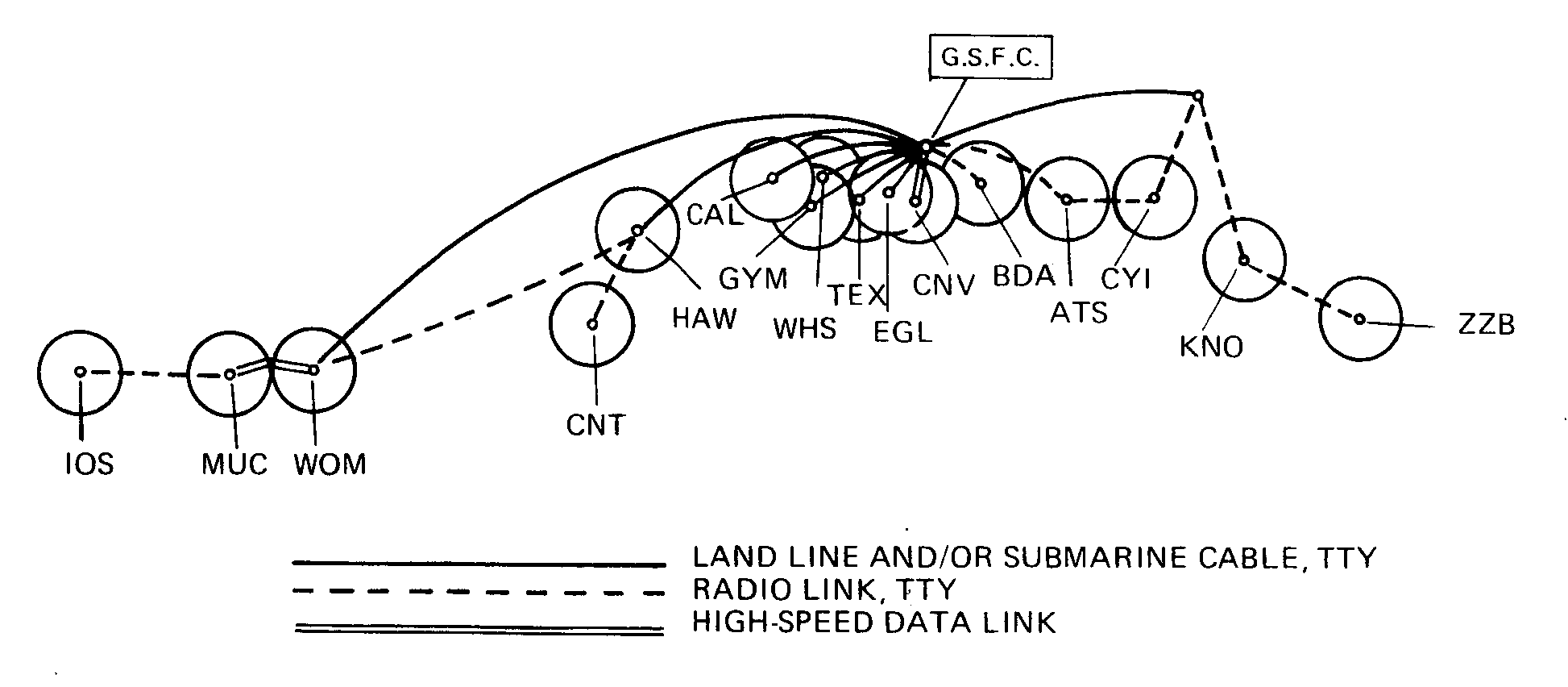
Network in use during Project Mercury

Prior to the advent of NASCOM, the Minitrack network—used to track the flights of Sputnik, Vanguard, Explorer, and other early spacecraft—largely relied on military-supplied teletype lines which were limited to about 30 bits per second. Scientific data from the Vanguard missions was recorded at ground stations onto magnetic tape, and air mailled to the control center at the Naval Research Laboratory. This reliance on military lines and stations undermined somewhat the purely scientific climate that the Navy and NASA sought to promote.

As NASA developed more advanced satellites in the early 1960s, the capability for telecommand grew, and Minitrack was no longer sufficient. Later, as NASA recruited personnel from military and industry, it began to accrue an in-house knowledge base for wide-band, real-time computer-based networks. Network technologies used in NORAD and the Semi-Automatic Ground Environment (SAGE) defense system contributed to the development of NASCOM.

NASCOM began taking shape in the early 1960s, and was formally established in 1964, under the administration of the recently formed Office of Tracking and Data Acquisition. NASCOM tied together NASA's three tracking and acquisition networks at the time: the Spacecraft Tracking and Data Acquisition Network (STADAN), the Manned Space Flight Network (MSFN), and the Deep Space Network (DSN).

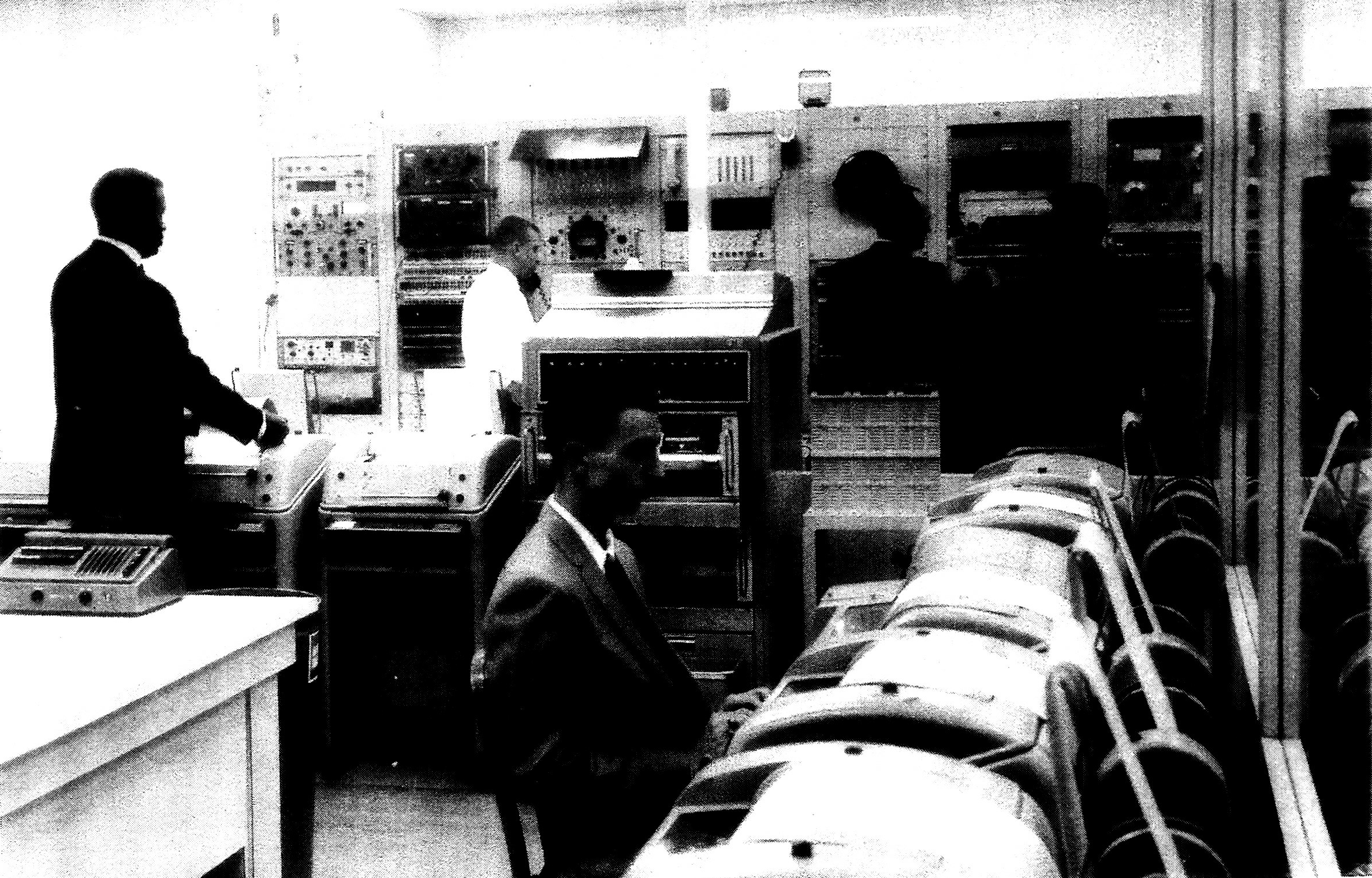
Teletype Center at NASA Goddard

=== Mercury ===
Crewed missions, beginning with Project Mercury in 1958, demanded a real-time voice circuit in addition to data circuits, and improved reliability. Specifications for the Mercury Network were issued on May 21, 1959, establishing a baseline with a mission control center in Cape Canaveral (later Houston), data convergence at Goddard, and switching stations overseas to provide redundancy and trunking over expensive transoceanic cables. These decisions would shape NASCOM for years to follow.

The Mercury network was designed by the Tracking and Ground Instrumentation Unit (TAGIU) at Langley, with support from Goddard. It consisted of a voice network and a teletype network on separate channels, each with a backup channel. The teletype network, based on the Western Union Type 111 Torn-Tape Relay System, did not offer any speed improvement over the Minitrack network, though it allowed switching based on coded addresses. A data trunk was established between Goddard and Cape Canaveral, with four voice-bandwidth circuits each capable of carrying 1000 bits per second. Later, voice-band links were established from STADAN ground stations and Bermuda.

The Mercury Network was designed under significant time pressure, and integration of the new circuits with the existing Minitrack network was a low priority. Minitrack, Mercury, and JPL networks would eventually be integrated, albeit slowly; an integrated communications division was formed at Goddard in July 1963 to coordinate all NASA ground communications, in what became known as NASCOM. This consolidation was part of a wider effort to standardize communications among federal agencies (the National Communications System), in response to difficulties that arose during the Cuban Missile Crisis.

=== Gemini ===
The Gemini Program introduced digital encoding to what would become the NASCOM network, enabling convergence among NASA's disparate networks. Between 1964 and 1966, several other advances were made to the network, largely to support the demands of crewed missions. Torn-tape and electromechanical switching systems were replaced with solid state, automated systems, and the switching center at Goddard was redesigned to improve reliability and capacity, using IBM 7094 and UNIVAC 490 computers. Voice capability was expanded to all MSFN, DSN, and other sites, and multiplexing of teletype messages was introduced at overseas switching centers.

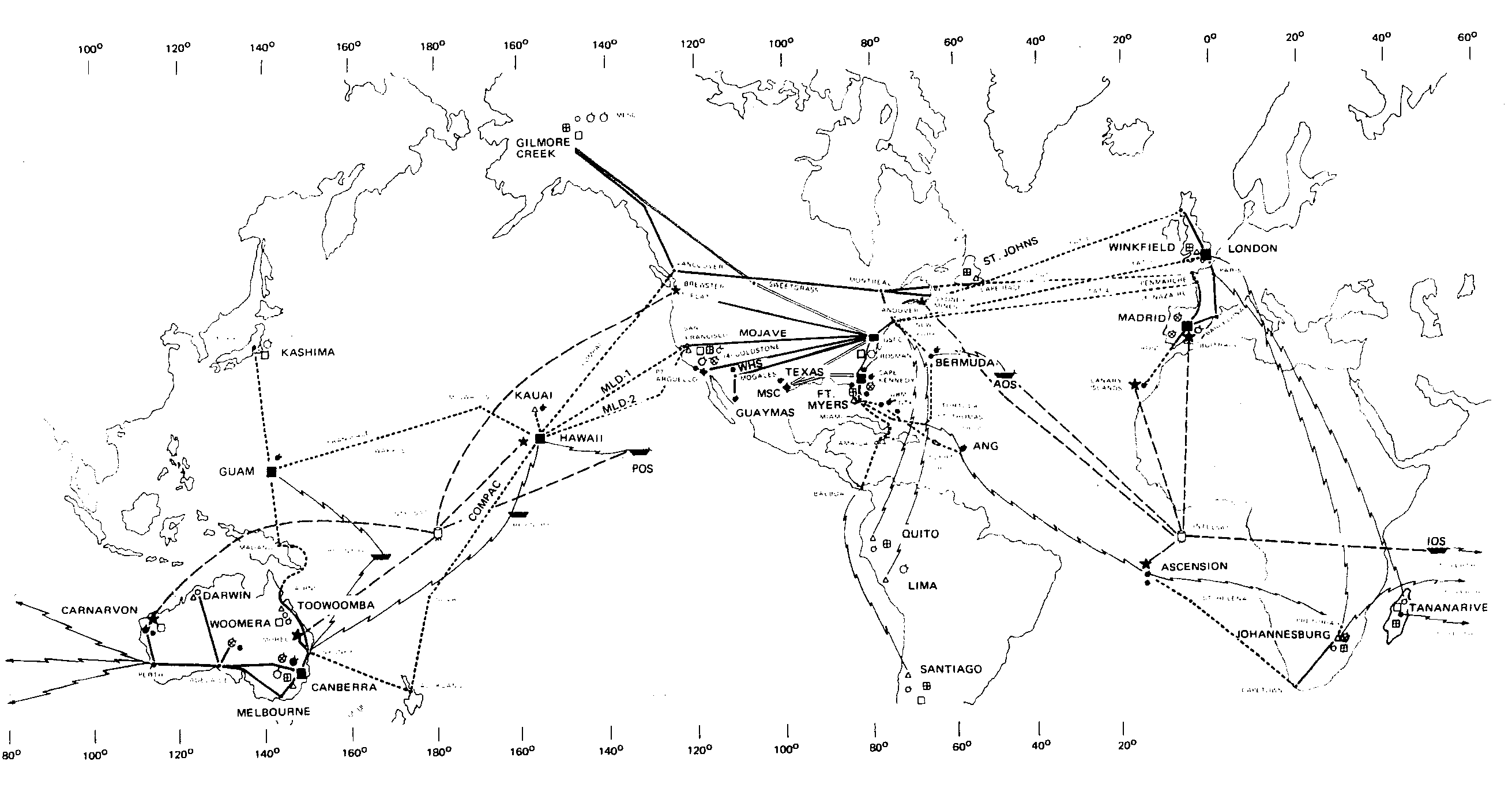
Major links in the NASCOM network, mid-1971

=== Apollo ===
The Apollo Program demanded augmentation of NASCOM lines to handle increased communication traffic, including television signals. By 1969, 2.0 million miles (3.2 million km) of circuits had been laid. By 1974, NASCOM was the largest broad-band, real-time communication network in the world, linking all the continents except for Asia and Antarctica, and allowing for a two-way "dialog" with spacecraft from a centralized mission control center.

Notably, Apollo also spurred the development of communications satellites. In June 1965, NASA engaged the Communications Satellite Corporation (COMSAT) to launch three geosynchronous satellites to support communication with the Apollo tracking ships. Two of these spacecraft launched successfully, and began to handle commercial traffic in addition to supporting Apollo.

Throughout the Apollo Program, incremental improvements to NASCOM continued. High-speed data terminals were implemented across the world, new communications control centers and backup centers were established, lines were upgraded to support higher data rates, DSN stations were integrated into the teletype switching system, and a video control center was stood up in Sydney to switch between antennas and process color signals for television broadcast.

In July 1967, the Tracking and Data Systems Directorate was split, and NASCOM became part of the new Manned Spaceflight Support Directorate.

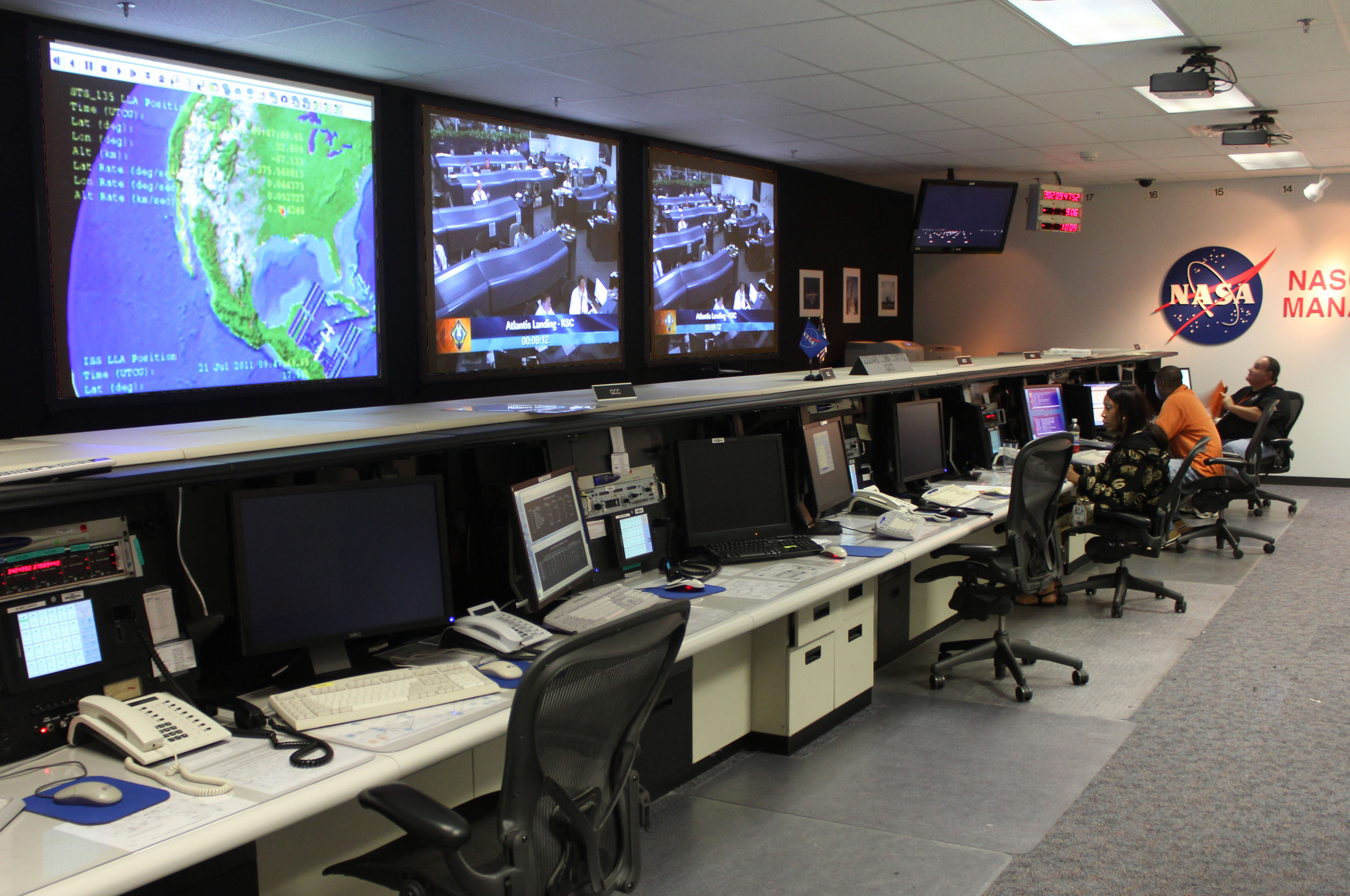
NASCOM control center in 2011

=== Post-Apollo ===
By 1983, NASCOM included 139 stations and 630 circuits, including satellite links, covering more than 2.5 million miles (4.0 million km), with nearly all of this circuitry leased.

NASCOM network development continued in the 1990s. By 1995, NASCOM was the largest of five wide area networks operated by NASA, with 900 leased circuits and a budget of $63 million. It employed 21 civil servants and 210 contracted personnel under two contracts. Soon after, NASA undertook an effort to consolidate these networks, in order to realize cost savings. In its FY1995 Nascom System Development Plan, the NASA Communications Division underwent reorganization, with contractors taking over operations and maintenance roles previously performed by civil servants. The plan expressed the need to convert to standardized network systems.

With the advent of modern packet-switched networks, a custom tunneling protocol was created to support continued use of NASCOM's 1200-bit and 4800-bit data block point-to-point format; requiring custom hardware and software. NASA announced a plan to eliminate the need for the 4800-bit data block protocol by 1997. In 2002, NASA funded an investigation into replacing NASCOM data blocks with the CCSDS Space Link Extension service. As of 2007, NASCOM data blocks were considered a "legacy" protocol, and continued to be encapsulated in IP packets for transmission on the NASA Integrated Services Network (NISN).

== See also ==
- Minitrack
- Spacecraft Tracking and Data Acquisition Network (STADAN)
- Manned Space Flight Network (MSFN)
- Space Communications and Navigation Program (SCaN), established 2006, which manages communications with the space segment
  - Space Network (SN)
  - Near Earth Network (NEN)
  - Deep Space Network (DSN)
- Tracking and Data Relay Satellite System (TDRSS)
- NASA Integrated Services Network (NISN)
