= STARGATE =

Radio-frequency technology facility in southern Texas

Coordinates: 25.9854°N 97.1872°W

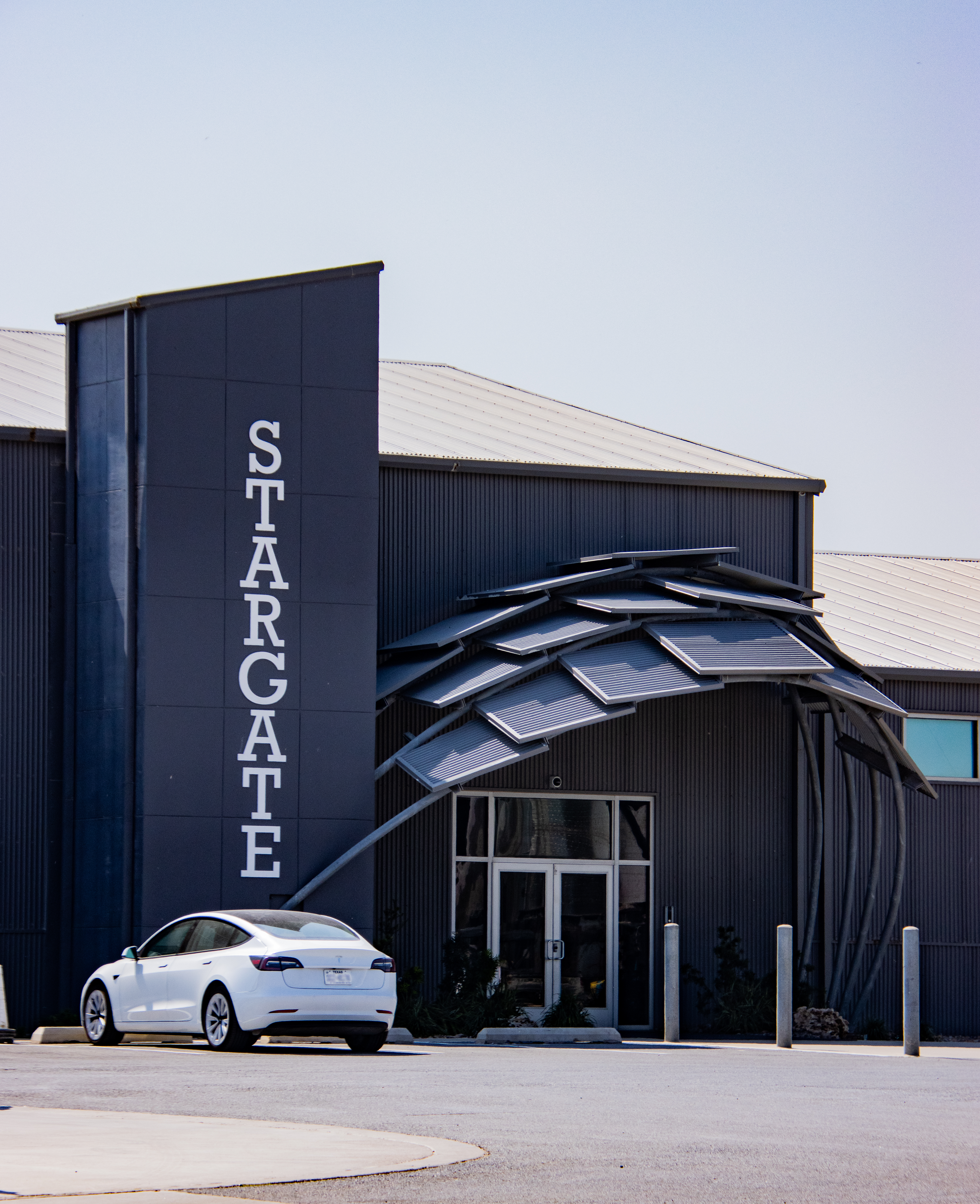
The STARGATE main facility, between Texas State Highway 4 and the SpaceX High Bay, March 2023

STARGATE (Spacecraft Tracking and Astronomical Research into Gigahertz Astrophysical Transient Emission) was a radio-frequency (RF) technology facility which was located next to the SpaceX Starbase in south Texas.

The facility was intended to provide students and faculty access to RF technologies widely used in spaceflight operations, including satellite and spacecraft tracking.

In 2019, the main STARGATE facility was leased to SpaceX for use in development of the SpaceX Starship, although other STARGATE assets continued to operate at other locations, primarily UTRGV's main campus in Brownsville. In December 2024, the University of Texas System approved sale of the main STARGATE facility to SpaceX. In April 2025, SpaceX demolished the STARGATE building to make way for construction of its new GigaBay manufacturing facility.

== History ==
The Spacecraft Tracking and Astronomical Research into Gigahertz Astrophysical Transient Emission facility was proposed in 2012 by Fredrick (Rick) Jenet, director of the Center for Advanced Radio Astronomy (CARA) and an associate professor of physics and astronomy at the University of Texas-Brownsville. Initial funding included US$500,000 in seed money provided by the Greater Brownsville Incentives Corporation in October 2012, as part of a package to increase the likelihood of attracting SpaceX to build a launch site in the area. The goal was also to have students and the faculty to be hands-on and assist with launches and space exploration, which was viewed as a rare opportunity.

In 2014, following the announcement of the SpaceX private spaceport being built near Boca Chica Beach, the Brownsville Economic Development Council (BEDC) purchased several lots in Starbase totaling 2.3 acres (0.93 ha) approximately 2 miles (3.2 km) from the SpaceX launch site and renamed it as the STARGATE subdivision. The land is used for the STARGATE project including the construction of a 12,000 square feet (1,100 m^{2}) tracking center.

Construction bids for a dual-channel fiber optic link between UT Brownsville and the STARGATE/SpaceX sites at Boca Chica went out in early March 2015.

In mid-2015, the University of Texas at Brownsville merged with another university to become the University of Texas Rio Grande Valley. STARGATE contracts and administration moved to the new university administrative structure.

Two 9 m (30 ft) S-band tracking station antennas from the decommissioned Merritt Island Spaceflight Tracking and Data Network station were refurbished and installed at the site in 2016–2017.

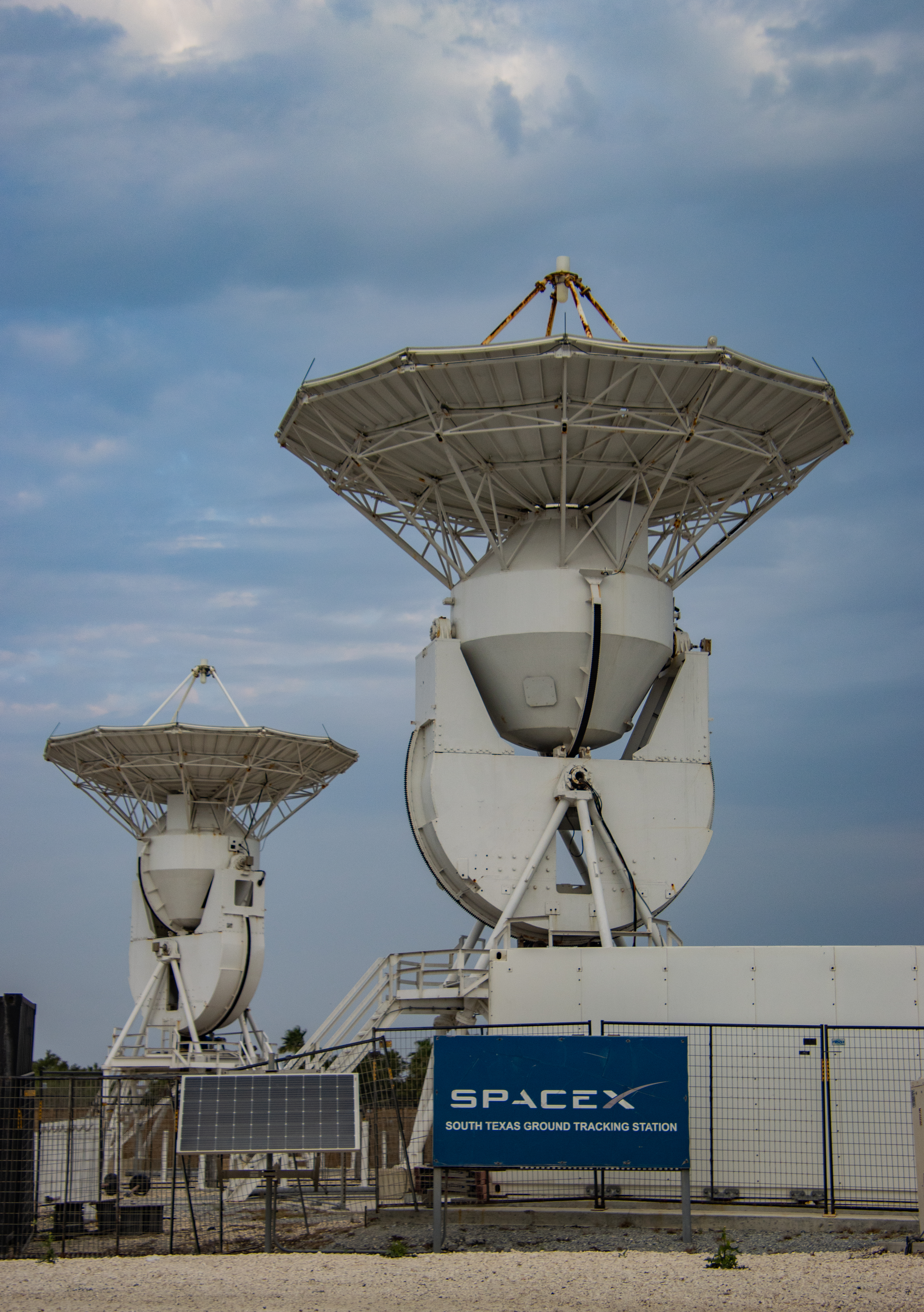
The two SpaceX-owned S-band antennas as seen in spring 2023.

=== Funding ===
As of March 2015, the grants to fund STARGATE have totaled approximately US$10.7 million, consisting of:

- US$4.4 million from the Texas Emerging Technology Fund
- US$4.6 million from the University of Texas System
- US$1.2 million from the US Economic Development Administration
- US$0.5 million from the Greater Brownsville Incentives Corporation.

STARGATE was initially funded by US$500,000 in seed money provided by the Greater Brownsville Incentives Corporation in October 2012, which was intended to improve the likelihood that Brownsville would be successful in attracting SpaceX to build a launch site in the area.

Further incentives were presented to SpaceX in September 2013 when the University of Texas System proposed that SpaceX partner with UT Brownsville's Center for Advanced Radio Astronomy in building and operating STARGATE.

STARGATE received a US$1.2 million grant from the US Economic Development Administration in October 2014.

Early in 2015, "the Brownsville Economic Development Council donated property at Boca Chica to the UT system for the STARGATE Technology Park." The dollar value of the in-kind funding for the property was not released.

== Technology ==
As of October 2014, STARGATE intended to develop new devices and new algorithms for tracking spacecraft, and intends to commercialize those technologies.

STARGATE planned to "test and commercialize a new phased-array antenna system that will replace fixed satellite-dish tracking communication systems."

== See also ==
- European Space Tracking
- ISRO Telemetry, Tracking and Command Network
- NASA Deep Space Network
- Near Earth Network
- Space Network
- Merritt Island Spaceflight Tracking and Data Network station
- Starlink – a satellite constellation that provides both backhaul and direct internet service, and which utilizes phased-array antenna technology for the terrestrial transceivers
