= NASA Integrated Services Network =

The NASA Integrated Services Network (NISN) is a global system of communications transmission, switching, and terminal facilities that provides NASA with wide area network communications services. The NISN services that support the Space Network (SN) include real-time and mission critical Internet Protocol (IP) routed data, as well as high-rate data and video services that connect the SN ground facilities. Inter-Center mission voice communications services are also provided for management of the network and support of user missions.

The NISN consists of two networks; a Mission Network with control installed in the Goddard Space Flight Center and the Institutional Network controlled in the Marshall Space Flight Center which serves the daily communication activities to many at NASA. The network serves all NASA Centers including NASA Headquarters in Washington, international and domestic partners, most flight programs and other US federal agencies. NISN also services all three prime NASA space networks, as well as SCaN.

== History ==
In 1995 The NASA Integrated Services Network (NISN) was formed, combining NASA’s NASCOM mission and its administrative WAN into a single organization. The NISN Mission Network continued to support Legacy data handling protocols, notably the 4800-bit NASCOM data blocks which were encapsulated in Internet Protocol Packets well into the 2000s. Servicing of both the Institutional and Mission networks were delegated via the US General Services Administration's Federal Technology Service Contracting mechanism, with AT&T administering the Mission Network.

In 2006 the NISN Institutional Network was upgraded to being a fibre-optic network with gigabit capacity by contractors at Qwest. Despite efforts to modernise the network, many systems that made up NISN at the time were dated, many to the point of being both "End of life" and "End of service" meaning that the vendors of such equipment would no longer service them. In the same year, NISN was placed underneath the newly formed Space Communications and Navigation Program (SCaN).

By February 2007, the annual budget dedicated to NISN had grown to 94 million United States Dollars annually, with 25 civil service employees and 250 contractors maintaining the system.

== See also ==
- Ground segment
- NASCOM
