= Remote monitoring and control =

System to control large facilities

Remote monitoring and control (M&C) systems are designed to control large or complex facilities such as factories, power plants, network operations centers, airports, and spacecraft, with some degree of automation.

M&C systems may receive data from sensors, telemetry streams, user inputs, and pre-programmed procedures. The software may send telecommands to actuators, computer systems, or other devices.

M&C systems may perform closed-loop control.

Once limited to SCADA in industrial settings, remote monitoring and control is now applied in numerous fields, including:

- Smart grids
- Positive train control
- Structural health monitoring
- Pipeline sensors
- Patient monitoring
- Desktop/server monitoring

While this field overlaps with machine to machine communications, the two are not completely identical.

== See also ==
- Control engineering
- Control room
- Control theory
- Instrument control
- Remote sensing
- Remote terminal unit
- M&C!
