= Tracking and data relay satellite =

American communications satellite

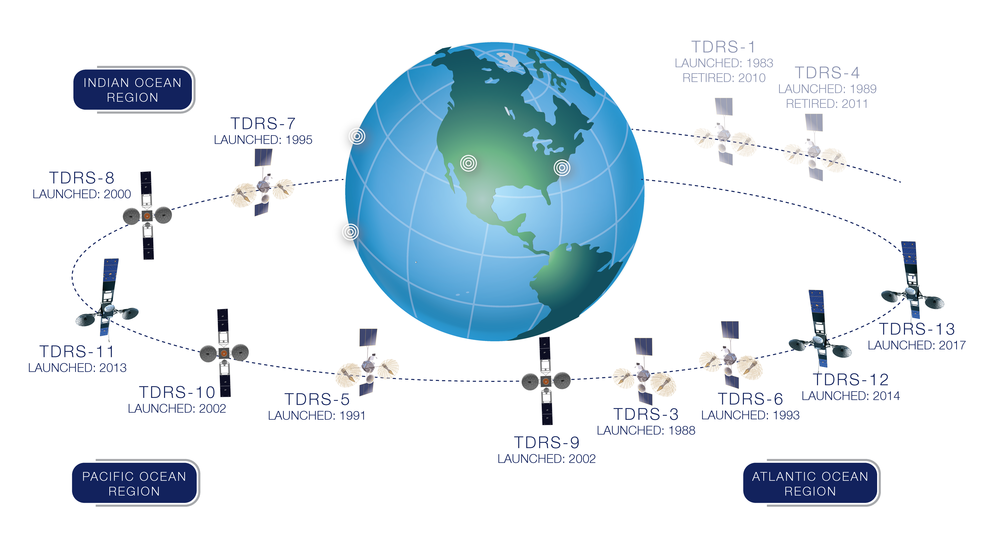
Location of TDRS as of March 2019

The launch of TDRS-K begins the replenishment of the fleet through the development and deployment of the next generation spacecraft.

This visualization begins by showing how a typical spacecraft (Nimbus 7) communicated with the ground before TDRS.

Visualization depicting TDRS satellites communicating with customer satellites.

A tracking and data relay satellite (TDRS) is a type of communications satellite that forms part of the Tracking and Data Relay Satellite System (TDRSS) used by NASA and other United States government agencies for communications to and from independent "User Platforms" such as satellites, balloons, aircraft, the International Space Station, and remote bases like the Amundsen-Scott South Pole Station. This system was designed to replace an existing worldwide network of ground stations that had supported all of NASA's crewed flight missions and uncrewed satellites in low-Earth orbits. The primary system design goal was to increase the amount of time that these spacecraft were in communication with the ground and improve the amount of data that could be transferred. These TDRSS satellites are all designed and built to be launched to and function in geosynchronous orbit, 35,786 km (22,236 mi) above the surface of the Earth.

The first seven TDRSS satellites were built by the TRW corporation. The three later versions have been manufactured by the Boeing corporation's Satellite Systems division. Thirteen satellites have been launched; however, one was destroyed in the Challenger disaster. TDRS-1 was decommissioned in October 2009. TDRS-4 was decommissioned in December 2011. Ten TDRSS satellites are currently in service. All of the TDRSS satellites have been managed by NASA's Goddard Space Flight Center. The contract for TDRS versions L & K was awarded to Boeing on December 20, 2007. On November 30, 2011, NASA announced the decision to order an additional third-generation TDRS satellite, TDRS M.

In 2022 NASA announced it would begin to phase out the TDRS system and hand off satellite relay services to commercial providers. In 2024 it announced that while TDRS satellites would probably continue to operate for a decade or more, all new orbital missions would communicate through privately-operated satellite networks.

== Operations ==
The first tracking and data relay satellite was launched in 1983 on the Space Shuttle Challenger's first flight, STS-6. The Boeing-built Inertial Upper Stage that was to take the satellite from Challenger's orbit to its ultimate geosynchronous orbit suffered a failure that caused it not to deliver the TDRS to the correct orbit. As a result, it was necessary to command the satellite to use its onboard rocket thrusters to move it into its correct orbit. This expenditure of fuel reduced its capability to remain in a geostationary orbit; by late 1997 the orbit had changed to the point that the satellite was able to see the South Pole, and an uplink/downlink station was installed at Amundsen–Scott South Pole Station in January 1998; TDRS-1 was an important communication uplink for Antarctic research until 2009.

The second tracking and data relay satellite was destroyed along with Challenger shortly after launch during the STS-51-L mission in January 1986. The next five TRW-built TDRSS satellites were successfully launched on other Space Shuttles. Three follow-up Boeing-built satellites were launched by Atlas rockets in 2000 and 2002. A NASA Press Release summarized the capabilities of the system as a whole:

"Working solo, TDRS-1 provided more communication coverage, in support of the September 1983 Shuttle mission, than the entire network of NASA tracking stations had provided in all previous Shuttle missions."

The first generation of TDRS are planned to be retired in 2015.

== TDRSS ground terminals ==
The two TDRSS satellite ground terminals are located at NASA White Sands Complex, which is in the Las Cruces area. All radioed commands and received telemetry that go to and from the tracking and data relay satellites go by way of these terminals at the White Sands Complex. At first, just one large ground terminal system for the TDRSS was designed and built. However, some years later, due to increased user demand NASA ordered the design and construction of a second ground terminal system about 5 kilometres (3.1 mi) away. Thus, there are now two functionally identical and redundant satellite ground terminals there, which are known as the White Sands Complex. Due to a Zone of Exclusion, no user support over the Indian Ocean, a ground terminal was built in Guam to support TDRS.

=== Bilateration ranging transponder system ===
The bilateration ranging transponder system (BRTS) provides tracking support for TDRS spacecraft. BRTS consists of four sites located at White Sands Missile Range (WSC), Guam (GRGT), Ascension Island (ACN), and Alice Springs, Australia (ALS).

== Design ==
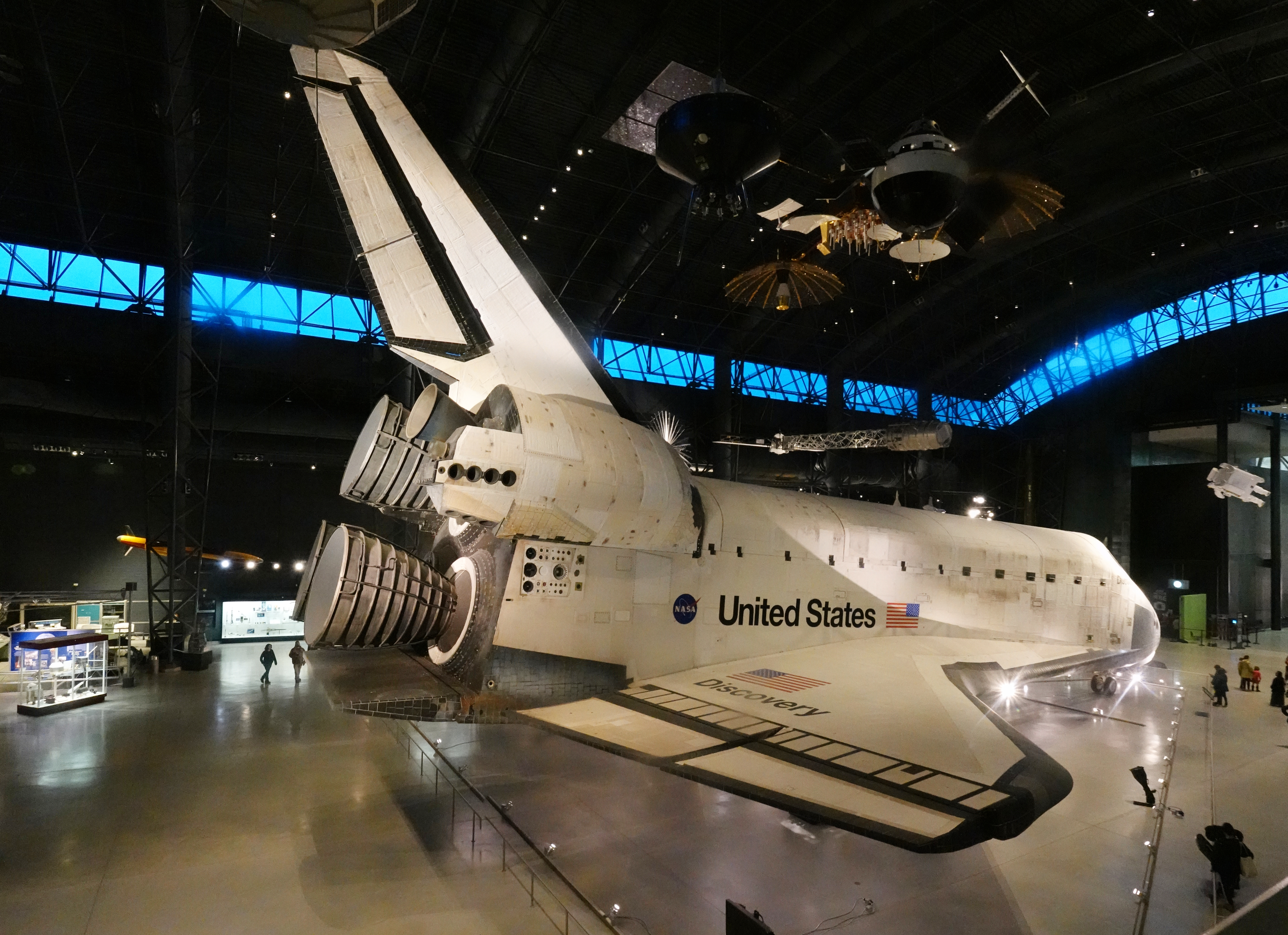
A first-generation TDRS satellite on display at the Steven F. Udvar-Hazy Center, placed above Space Shuttle Discovery.

The communications systems of the TDRSS satellites were designed to support multiple missions at the same time. Each satellite has S band, K_{u} band (1st Gen only), and K_{a} band (2nd gen only) electronic communication systems hardware that operate at different carrier frequencies and also support various data-rates. The newer Boeing satellites are able to support more communications than the older TRW-built satellites.

== Different versions of the TDRS ==
Section source: NASA TDRSS official site

- First generation TDRS: models A to G
- Second generation TDRS: models H to J
- Third generation TDRS: models K to M
- Launch site: Cape Canaveral, United States
- Launch vehicle: Space Shuttle, Atlas II or Atlas V booster
- Mass: 2108.0 kg
- Nominal power: 1700.0 W

Capability	1st gen	2nd gen	3rd gen
Solar Panels	2	2	2
Single Access Antenna	2	2	2
S band	yes	yes	yes
Ku band	yes	yes	yes
Ka band	no	yes	yes
Multi Access Antenna			
receive elements	30	32	32
transmit elements	12	15	15
beamforming		on-board	ground
S band	yes	yes	yes
Omni Antenna			
S band	yes	yes	yes
Space-to-ground Antenna	2.0m	2.4m	
S band	yes	yes	yes

=== Launch history ===
Sub-section source: NSSDC Master Catalog Display: Spacecraft

Note: While a TDRSS satellite is in the manufacturing process, it is given a letter designation, but once it has successfully achieved the correct geosynchronous orbit, it is referred to with a number (for example, TDRS-A during development and before on-orbit acceptance, and TDRS-1 after acceptance on orbit and put into operational use). Thus, satellites that are lost in launch failures or have massive malfunctions are never numbered.

=== TDRS background ===
Source: NASA: TDRS A Satellite

TDRS-A was the first of TDRSS multiple satellite tracking system. The system is a concept utilizing communication satellite technology that improves and economizes the satellite tracking and telemetry operations. The base three geosynchronous satellites (one a standby) track and receive data from satellites for relay to a ground station. The two primary active satellites are separated in orbit by at least 130 degrees longitude.

One system is used for tracking satellites with apogees below 2000 km (the great majority of satellites), and the other for those with higher apogees. Use of operating frequencies near 2150 (plus or minus 150) MHz and near 14.3 (plus or minus 0.9) GHz were the initial plan.

TDRSS was originally intended to support satellites with apogees below 12,000 km. Spacecraft in the TDRSS require only one communications system, since ground-based telemetry stations will be compatible with TDRSS equipment.

== Gallery ==
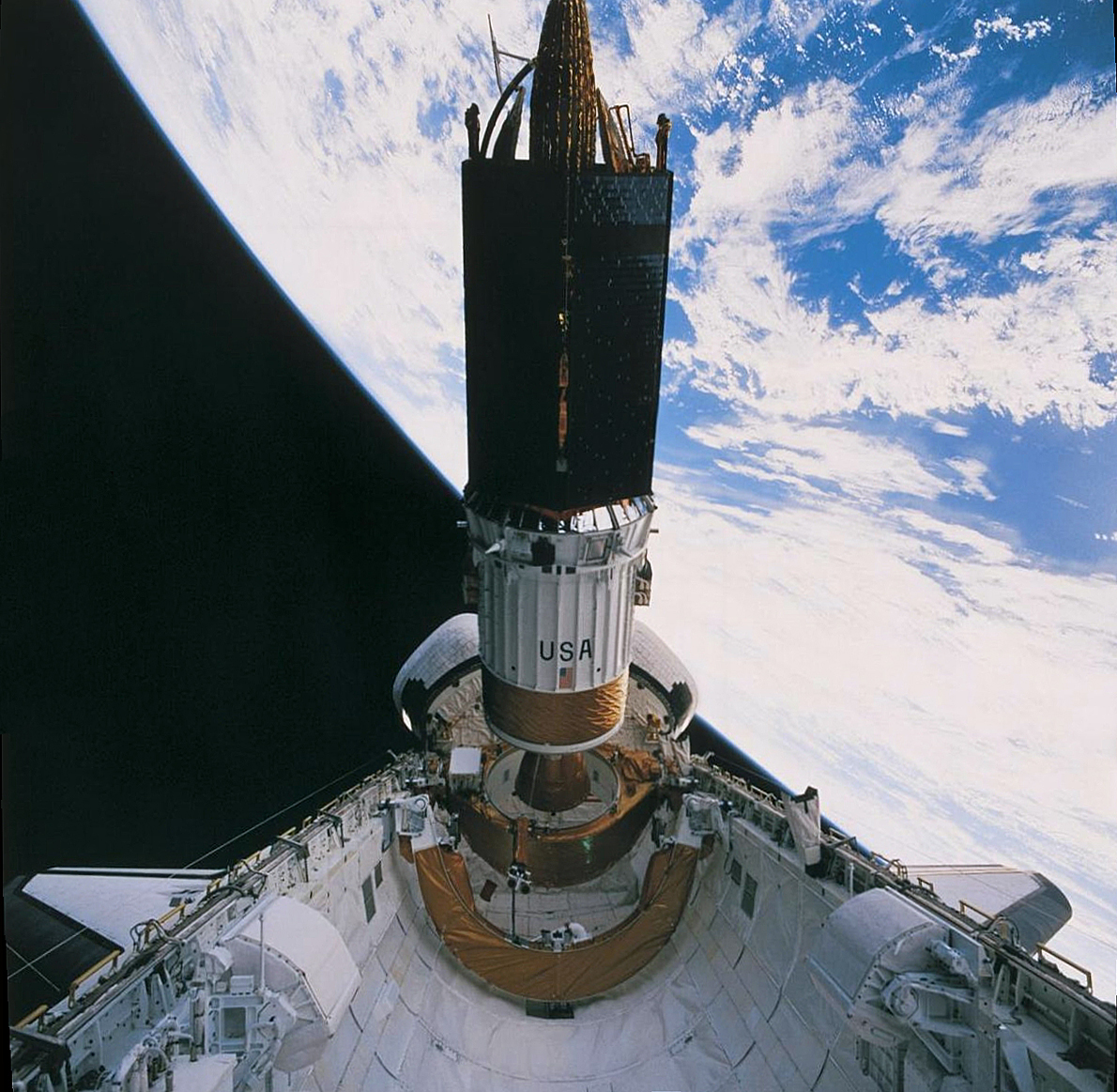
TDRS is deployed on STS-54 with IUS booster.

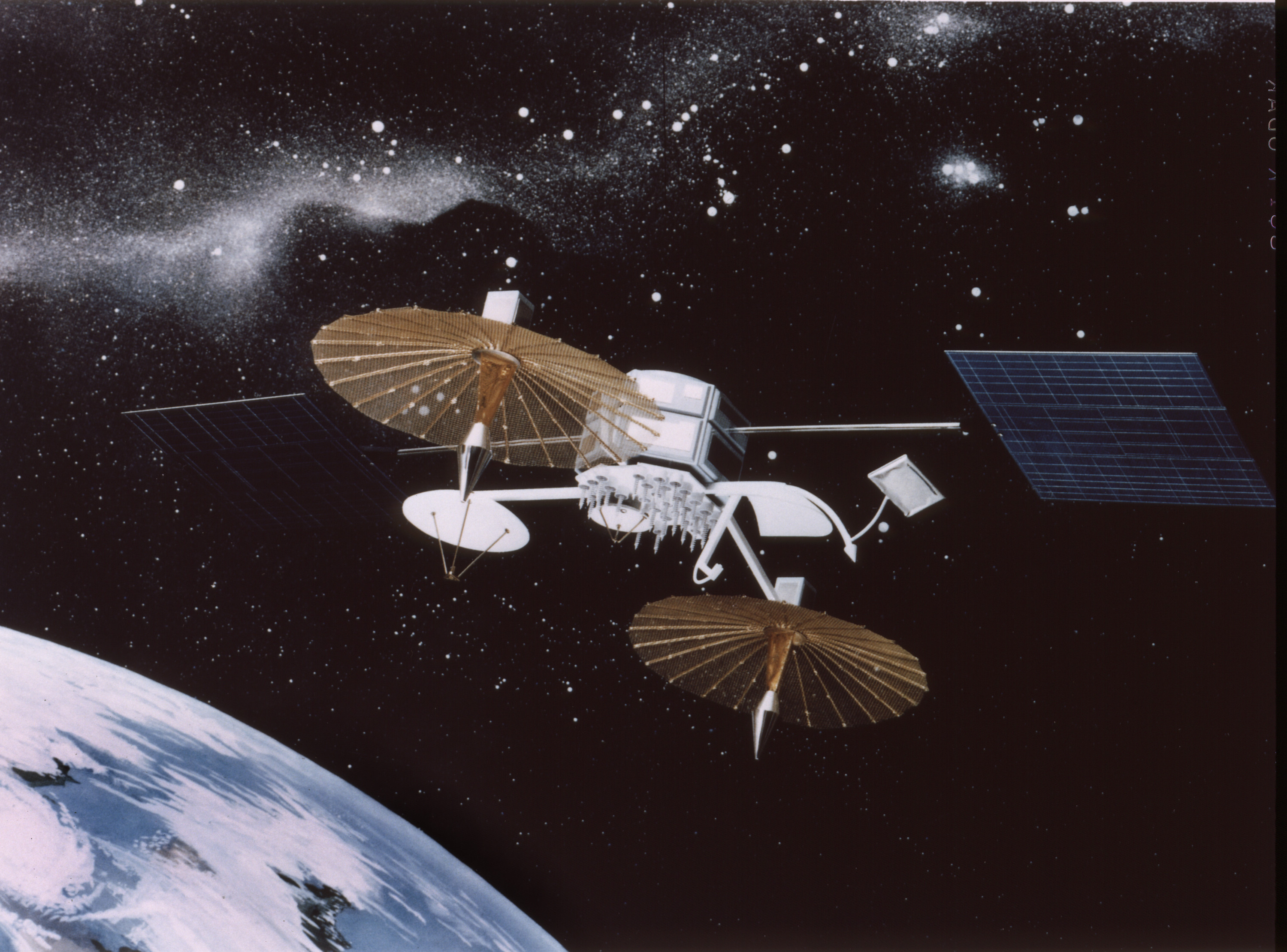
First-generation TDRS.

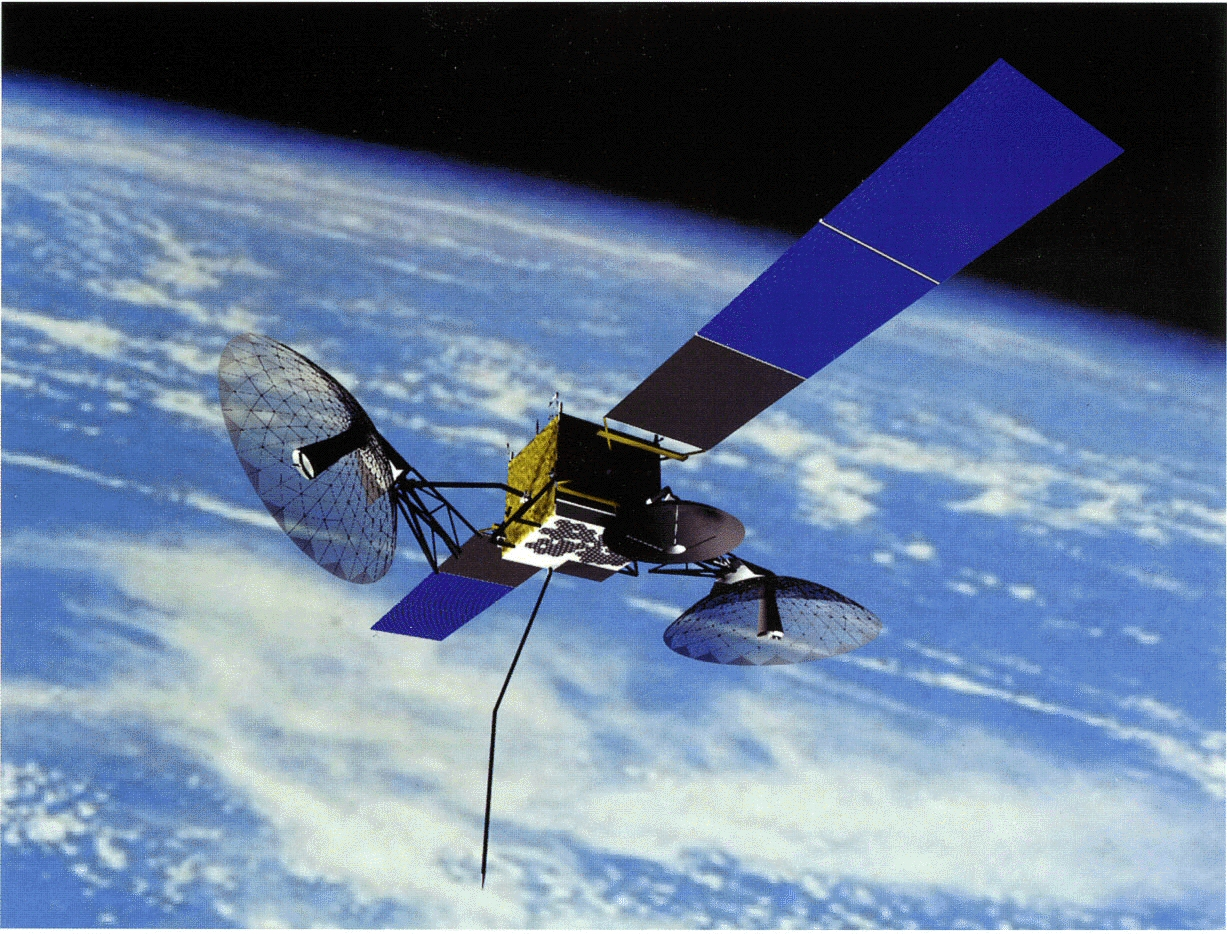
Second-generation TDRS.

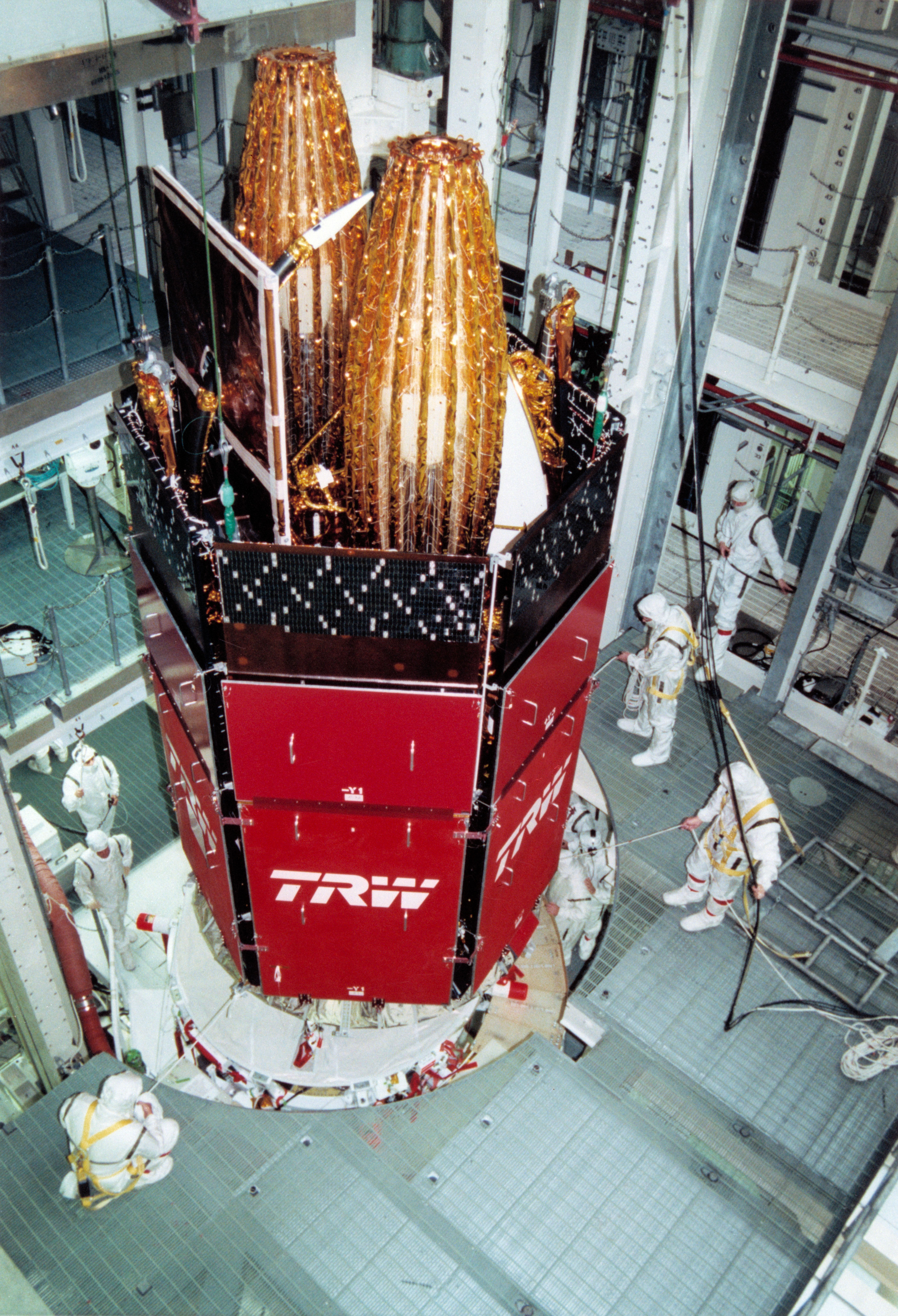
TDRS-G at Kennedy Space Center.

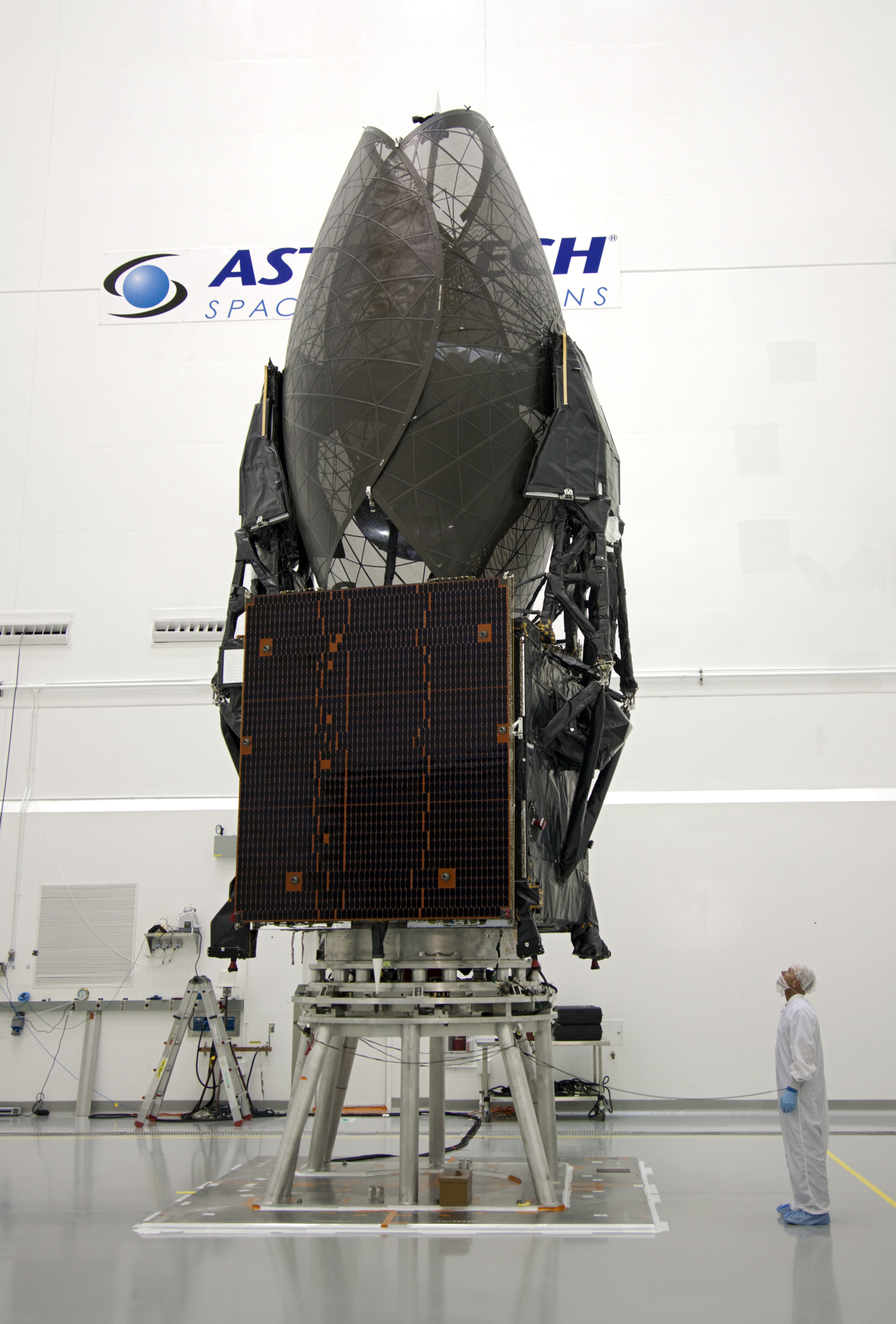
TDRS-K prior to launch at Kennedy Space Center.

== See also ==
- TDRS GSFC NASA page
- SCaN Program
- European Data Relay System
- Luch (satellite)
- Indian Data Relay Satellite System
- Space Network
- Deep Space Network
- Near Earth Network
- Eastern Range

== Notes ==
- NASA's Goddard Space Flight Center TDRS K/L Official Page
- NASA's Goddard Space Flight Center Space Network Official Page
