= Space Communications and Navigation Program =

Office within NASA

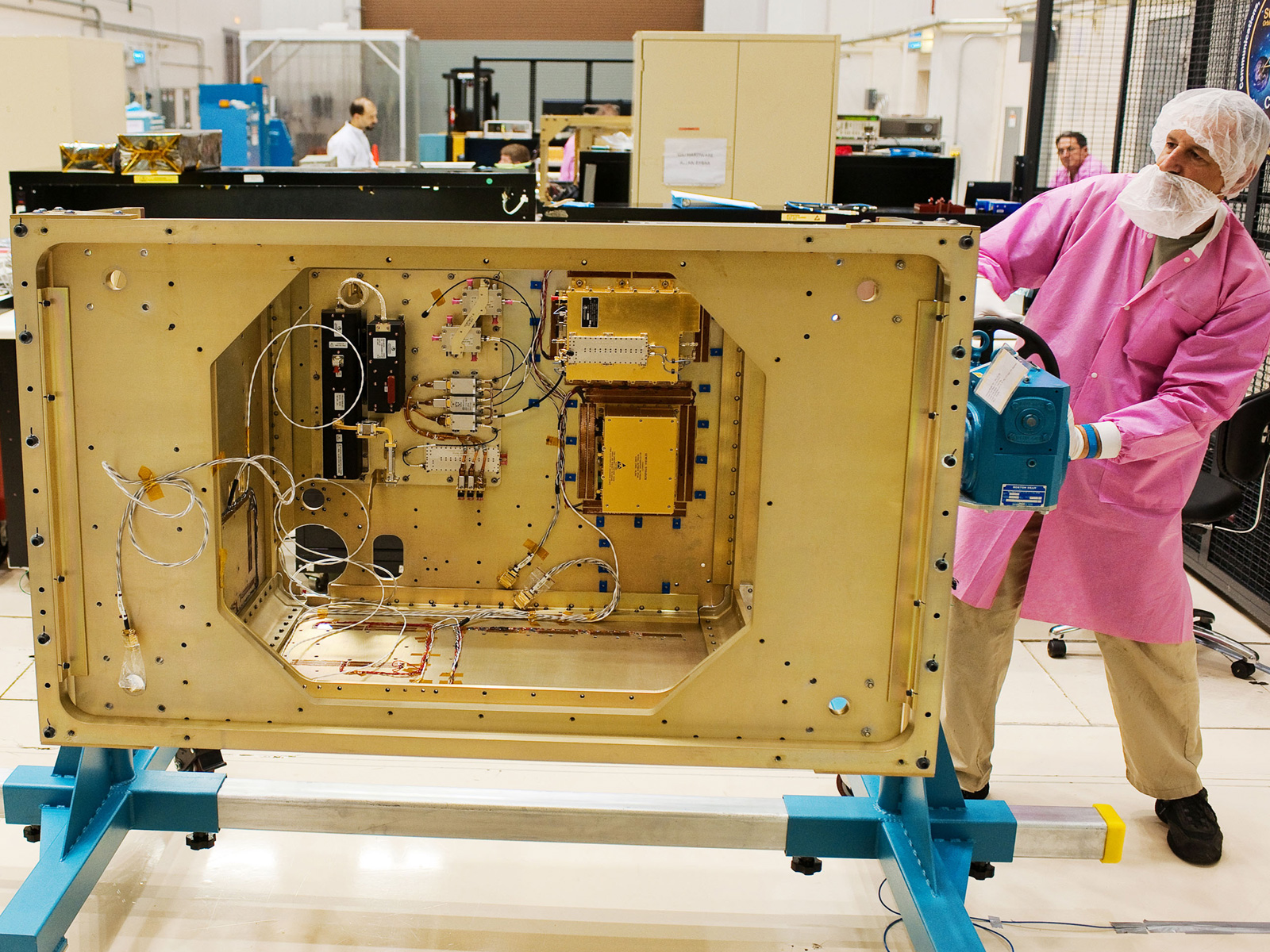
Technicians at NASA Glenn Research Center at work on the Space Communications and Navigation Testbed, formerly known as the Communications, Navigation, and Networking reConfigurable Testbed (CoNNeCT) project

The Space Communications and Navigation (SCaN) program places the three prime NASA space communications networks, Space Network (SN), Near Earth Network (NEN) (previously known as the Ground Network or GN), and the Deep Space Network (DSN), under one management and systems engineering umbrella. It was established in 2006. It was previously known as the Space Communications & Data Systems (SCDS) Program.

== History ==
Before NASA's administrator Michael D. Griffin created SCaN to direct an integrated networks program, different organizations at NASA Headquarters have managed the Agency's space communications capabilities and functions under separate Programs using a variety of administrative approaches.

The SCaN Office was established by direction of Griffin in a Memorandum entitled "Establishment of a Space Communications and Navigation Office," dated July 19, 2006. SCaN operates as a central organization within the Space Operations Mission Directorate.

The Office's responsibilities encompass the management of existing space networks including the Tracking and Data Relay Satellite system, the Deep Space Network, the Ground Network, the NASA Integrated Services Network; implementing any improvements and upgrades to those systems and networks; and developing any future NASA communications and navigation architectures.

The Ground Network (GN) has since been renamed the Near Earth Network.

== Services ==
SCaN is viewed as a service provider supporting interfaces and performing a standard set of functions, including:

- Forward data transfer (uplink to spacecraft)
- Return data transfer (downlink from spacecraft to ground)
- Dissimilar voice communications
- Emergency communications
- Post-landing communications
- Radiometric measurement
- Time correlation
- Service monitoring
- Ephemeris exchange
- Operational coordination
- Service scheduling.

== Communications schemes ==
Communications with spaceborne platforms is performed by RF, with a selection of spectra, modulation, and encoding methods, enumerated below.

=== Spectra ===
The Space Network communicates with spacecraft using S-band, Ku-band, and Ka-band with planned laser/optical communications.

The Deep Space Network communicates with spacecraft using S-band, X-band, and Ka-band.

=== Modulation ===
SN uses phase-shift keying and phase modulation of the carrier signal.

=== Encoding ===
The Space Network (used for near-Earth communications) supports the following encoding schemes:

- BPSK
- QPSK/SQPSK
- 8PSK
- Rate 1/2 convolutional coding
- SQPN
- PRN coding - used to reduce power spectral density for low bit rate signals, and for time transfer.

The Reed–Solomon method is used as the initial error-correcting block code prior to the selected secondary encoding scheme.

== See also ==
- Indian Deep Space Network
- Tracking and Data Relay Satellite
- Eastern Range
- NASCOM
