= Merritt Island Spaceflight Tracking and Data Network station =

Spaceflight comm center (1966–2011)

The MILA tracking station with the Vehicle Assembly Building in the distance.

The Merritt Island Spaceflight Tracking and Data Network station, known in NASA parlance as MILA, was a radio communications and spacecraft tracking complex located on 61 acres (0.25 km^{2}) at the Kennedy Space Center (KSC) in Florida. The name MILA was an acronym for the "Merritt Island Launch Annex" to Cape Canaveral Air Force Station, which was how the site was referred to when spacecraft launches were primarily originating from the adjacent military installation. MILA's arrays of antennas provided various communications and data services between spacecraft and NASA centers, as well as tracked and ranged moving spacecraft. In its final years, it served as the primary voice and data link during the first 7½ minutes of Space Shuttle launches, and the final 13 minutes of shuttle landings at KSC. Though it occupied land at KSC, MILA was operated and managed by the Goddard Space Flight Center.

The station was decommissioned on July 28, 2011 following the end of the shuttle program. NASA eventually plans to build a new, state-of-the-art station, Kennedy Uplink Station, on the other side of the KSC Visitor Complex to support launches of a heavy-lift rocket planned for exploration missions.

== History ==
The MILA tracking station was installed in 1966 as part of a worldwide network of 17 ground-based tracking stations to support the Apollo program. It was first used for a Saturn 1B test launch (AS-203) in July 1966. Training consoles were installed shortly thereafter to train engineers from the Johnson Space Center. During the 1970s, nearby tracking stations such as the Spacecraft Tracking and Data Acquisition Network station in Fort Myers, Florida, and the Deep Space Network Compatibility Station at Cape Canaveral were closed, and their facilities moved to MILA. MILA was upgraded in 1980 to allow interfacing with the Tracking and Data Relay Satellite System (TDRSS), the first satellite of which was launched in 1983.

=== PDL ===
The PDL tracking station, with the Ponce de León Inlet for which it was named in the background.

In 1979, an adjunct tracking site was established 40 miles (64 km) north of MILA in New Smyrna Beach, Florida, on property owned by the US Coast Guard. This site was required to permit tracking of Space Shuttle launches from differing angles because the Solid Rocket Boosters (SRBs) used on the Shuttle vehicle produced large amounts of ammonium perchlorate in their exhaust plumes, which strongly attenuated the S-band signals transmitted to and from MILA. This adjunct site was designated the Ponce de León Inlet Tracking Annex (PDL), for the Ponce de León Inlet located nearby.

The PDL site handled the voice and data tracking functions during the time that MILA was blocked by the SRB exhaust plume, which occurred from one minute after launch until 2½ minutes after launch. PDL continued to track the shuttle during the times that MILA was the primary link. Microwave relay towers in Shiloh, Florida and Wilson, Florida linked the data from PDL back to MILA where it was compared to the MILA tracking data as a redundancy measure.

In 2011, support for shuttle landings from the Ponce De Leon (PDL) site was terminated (“caretaker status”) as a cost-saving measure. In 2015, NASA began refurbishing and modernizing PDL and new with a new antenna system identical to the one at Kennedy Uplink Station, and will provide a crucial tracking capability following liftoff of the Space Launch System.

== Operations ==
MILA was operated by the Goddard Space Center in Greenbelt, Maryland. Its most visible function occurred during Space Shuttle launches, when it provided the primary voice and data link for Shuttle communications and systems health checks during the pre-launch phase and initial 7½ minutes of the launch phase. It performed a similar function during the final 13 minutes of a Shuttle landing at the Kennedy Space Center.

In addition to the launch and landing support, MILA provided pre-launch support for Shuttle payloads such as satellites, space station components, and scientific spacecraft, by ensuring their communication systems were fully functional prior to a launch. The facility could also serve as a backup to the TDRSS satellites, and could be employed to track expendable launch vehicles such as the Delta rocket.

== Facilities ==
The MILA tracking station from another angle.

MILA was located on 61 acres (0.25 km^{2}) of land at the Kennedy Space Center, 1 mile (1.6 km) southwest of the KSC Visitor Complex. The site had dedicated 250 and 500 kW generators which engaged prior to tracking operations for a launch or landing to ensure a continuous reliable power feed for the facility.

=== Antennas ===
MILA's antennas included:

- Two 30-foot (9.1 m) S-band dish antennas. These were used to track moving spacecraft, including every Shuttle launch and landing. After the site closure, they were transferred to, and installed at the University of Texas Rio Grande Valley STARGATE facility.
- Two 10-foot (3.0 m) dish antennas. These were used to interface between the TDRS satellites and the KSC facilities. One was pointed to the TDRS satellite, and the other, mounted atop a 140-foot (43 m) tower, pointed towards the TDRS user in the ground facility.
- Two UHF antennas used for voice communications with the Shuttle orbiter. These were linked to one of the 30-foot (9.1 m) tracking antennas to ensure they were properly pointed.
- Two 4-foot (1.2 m) dish antennas used for Deep Space Network vehicles during pre-launch testing. These antennas, one X-Band and one S-band, were mounted near the top of the 140-foot (43 m) tower.
- One 15-foot (4.6 m) S-band dish antenna, which served as a backup to the 30-foot (9.1 m) antennas, if one was undergoing maintenance or failed during use.
- Two 4-foot (1.2 m) dish antennas located on a tower north of the facility, which were used to calibrate the tracking antennas.
- One 6-foot (1.8 m) microwave antenna located on the tower north of the facility. This was used to link to the PDL tracking station via two intermediate antennas.
- Two UHF discone antennas which monitored the UHF tracking antennas.
- One shortwave antenna to receive the NIST time signal from the WWV Station in Colorado.

== See also ==
- Manned Space Flight Network
