= Near Earth Network =

Commercial orbital communications network

The Near Earth Network (NEN, formerly GN or Ground Network) provides orbital communications support for near-Earth orbiting customer platforms via various ground stations, operated by NASA and other space agencies. It uses a number of different dishes scattered around the globe. The antennas must be able to move fast for tracking of objects in low Earth orbit (LEO). The NEN and Space Network (SN) combined were previously referred to as the Spaceflight Tracking and Data Network (STDN).

== Ground stations ==
NEN uses several stations run by NASA:

- Alaska Satellite Facility in Fairbanks, Alaska— Supports: S/X Band — Assets: 11.3m/11m/9.1m
- Kennedy Uplink Station, Merritt Island Launch Annex (MILA)— Supports: S-band - Assets: 6.1m
- McMurdo, Antarctica— Supports: S/X Band — Assets: 10m
- Ponce de Leon Station, Florida — Supports: S-band - Assets: 6.1m
- Wallops Ground Station, in Wallops Island, Virginia— Supports: VHF, S/X Band — Assets: 11m/5m
- White Sands Ground Station, New Mexico — Supports: VHF, S/Ka Band — Assets: 18.3m

NEN uses Stations run by KSAT — Kongsberg Satellite Services:

- Singapore — Supports: S/X Band — Assets: 9.1m
- Svalbard Satellite Station Norway — Supports: S/X Band — Assets: 11.3m/11.3m/13m
- TrollSat, Antarctica — Supports: S/X Band — Assets: 7.3m/7.3m

NEN uses a Station run by SANSA — South African National Space Agency:

- Hartebeesthoek, South Africa — Supports: S/X Band — Assets: 12m/10m
- A new ground station is under construction in Matjiesfontein, scheduled to come online in 2025.

NEN uses Stations run by SSC — Swedish Space Corporation

- Kiruna, Sweden — Supports: S/X Band — Assets: 13m/13m
- Santiago, Chile— Supports: S Band — Assets: 9m/12m/13m
- SSC Space US North Pole, Alaska— Supports: S/X Band — Assets: 5.4m/7.3m/11m/13m
- SSC Space US Dongara, Australia — Supports: S/X Band — Assets: 13m
- Space US South Point, Hawaii — Supports: S/X Band — Assets: 13m/13m

Also under contract was Poker Flat Research Range. Additionally, the MILA and Wallops stations provide pre-launch, launch, and landing communications support for the Space Shuttle program.

== Authority and responsibility ==
The NEN falls under NASA's SOMD (Space Operations Mission Directorate), interoperating with the SCaN Program offices. The Goddard Space Flight Center Ground Network Project has responsibility for maintaining the NEN, as well as implementing the Satellite laser ranging (SLR) Network.

== Support for Constellation ==
The NEN was slated to support the Constellation Program, including the Ares launch vehicle, NISN (NASA Integrated Services Network), FDF (Flight Dynamics Facilities), KSC Launch Control Center, and the Constellation Mission Control Center (MCC). Constellation has since been canceled.

== See also ==
- Deep Space Network (DSN)
- Eastern Range (ER)
- Indian Deep Space Network (IDSN)
- Space Communications and Navigation Program (SCaN)
- Space Network (SN)
- Tracking and Data Relay Satellite (TDRS)

== Footnotes ==
- Constellation Architecture Requirements Document (CARD), CxP 70000, Revision C (December 25, 2008). NASA: Constellation Systems Engineering and Integration Office
- Space Network User's Guide (SNUG), 450-SNUG, Rev 9.
