= Telecommand =

Method of controlling a remote system

A telecommand or telecontrol is a command sent to control a remote system or systems not directly connected (e.g. via wires) to the place from which the telecommand is sent. The word is derived from tele = remote (Greek), and command = to entrust/order (Latin). Systems that need remote measurement and reporting of information of interest to the system designer or operator require the counterpart of telecommand, telemetry. The telecommand can be done in real time or not depending on the circumstances (in space, delay may be of days), as was the case of Marsokhod.

Examples include a television remote control, remote guidance of weapons or missiles, control of a satellite from a ground station, and flying a radio-controlled airplane.

== Transmission of commands ==
For a Telecommand (TC) to be effective, it must be compiled into a pre-arranged format (which may follow a standard structure), modulated onto a carrier wave which is then transmitted with adequate power to the remote system. The remote system will then demodulate the digital signal from the carrier, decode the TC, and execute it. Transmission of the carrier wave can be by ultrasound, infra-red or other electromagnetic means.

=== Infrared ===
Infrared light makes up the invisible section of the electromagnetic spectrum. This light, also classified as heat, transmits signals between the transmitter and receiver of the remote system. Telecommand systems usually include a physical remote, which contains four key parts: buttons, integrated circuit, button contacts, and a light-emitting diode. When the buttons on a remote are pressed they touch and close their corresponding contacts below them within the remote. This completes the necessary circuit on the circuit board along with a change in electrical resistance, which is detected by the integrated circuit. Based on the change in electrical resistance, the integrated circuit distinguishes which button was pushed and sends a corresponding binary code to the light-emitting diode (LED) usually located at the front of the remote. To transfer the information from the remote to the receiver, the LED turns the electrical signals into an invisible beam of infrared light that corresponds with the binary code and sends this light to the receiver. The receiver then detects the light signal via a photodiode and it is transformed into an electrical signal for the command and is sent to the receiver’s integrated circuit/microprocessor to process and complete the command. The strength of the transmitting LED can vary and determines the required positioning accuracy of the remote in relevance to the receiver. Infrared remotes have a maximum range of approximately 30 feet and require the remote control or transmitter and receiver to be within a line of sight.

=== Ultrasonic ===
Ultrasonic is a technology used more frequently in the past for telecommand. Inventor Robert Adler is known for inventing the remote control which did not require batteries and used ultrasonic technology. There are four aluminum rods inside the transmitter that produce high frequency sounds when they are hit at one end. Each rod is a different length, which enables them to produce varying sound pitches, which control the receiving unit. This technology was widely used but had certain issues such as dogs being bothered by the high frequency sounds.

== New applications ==
Often the smaller new remote controlled airplanes and helicopters are incorrectly advertised as radio controlled devices (see Radio control) but they are either controlled via infra-red transmission or electromagnetically guided. Both of these systems are part of the telecommand area.

== Encryption ==
To prevent unauthorised access to the remote system, TC encryption may be employed. Secret sharing may be used.

== See also ==
- Radio control
- Teleoperation
- Telerobotics
- Telemetry
