= List of Atlas launches (2000–2009) =

== Launch statistics ==
=== Rocket configurations ===
- Atlas IIA
- Atlas IIAS
- Atlas IIIA
- Atlas IIIB
- Atlas V 401
- Atlas V 411
- Atlas V 421
- Atlas V 431
- Atlas V 501
- Atlas V 521
- Atlas V 531
- Atlas V 551

=== Launch sites ===
- Cape Canaveral SLC-36A
- Cape Canaveral SLC-36B
- Cape Canaveral SLC-41
- Vandenberg SLC-3E

=== Launch outcomes ===
- Success
- Partial failure

== Launch history ==
=== 2000 ===
Flight №	Date / time (UTC)	Rocket	Launch site	Payload	Payload mass	Orbit	Customer	Launch outcome
AC-138	January 21, 2000; 01:03	Atlas IIA	CCAFS SLC-36A	DSCS IIIB-8	1,235 kg	GTO	DoD	Success
AC-138	Eleventh DSCS military communications satellite.							
AC-158	February 3, 2000; 23:30	Atlas IIAS	CCAFS SLC-36B	Hispasat 1C	3,113 kg	GTO	Hispasat	Success
AC-158	Commercial communications satellite.							
AC-137	May 3, 2000; 07:07	Atlas IIA	CCAFS SLC-36A	GOES-L	2,217 kg	GTO	NOAA / NASA	Success
AC-137	Eleventh GOES weather satellite.							
AC-201	May 24, 2000; 23:10	Atlas IIIA	CCAFS SLC-36B	Eutelsat W4	3,190 kg	GTO	Eutelsat	Success
AC-201	Commercial communications satellite; maiden flight of Atlas III.							
AC-139	June 30, 2000; 12:56	Atlas IIA	CCAFS SLC-36A	TDRS-H	3,192 kg	GTO	NASA	Success
AC-139	Eighth NASA Tracking Data Relay Satellite.							
AC-161	July 14, 2000; 05:21	Atlas IIAS	CCAFS SLC-36B	Echostar 6	3,700 kg	GTO	Echostar	Success
AC-161	Commercial communications satellite; most powerful direct broadcast satellite ever launched.							
AC-140	October 20, 2000; 00:40	Atlas IIA	CCAFS SLC-36A	DSCS III-B11		GTO	DoD	Success
AC-140	Twelfth DSCS military communications satellite.							
AC-157	December 6, 2000; 02:47	Atlas IIAS	CCAFS SLC-36A	NROL-10		GTO	NROL	Success
AC-157	Second third-generation SDS military communications satellite; also known as QUASAR 13.							
=== 2001 ===
Flight №	Date / time (UTC)	Rocket	Launch site	Payload	Payload mass	Orbit	Customer	Launch outcome
AC-156	June 19, 2001; 04:41:02	Atlas IIAS	CCAFS SLC-36B	ICO F2		MEO		Success
AC-156	High-speed mobile communications satellite; never used once launched.							
AC-142	July 23, 2001; 07:23	Atlas IIA	CCAFS SLC-36A	GOES-M	2,279 kg	GTO	NOAA / NASA	Success
AC-142	Twelfth GOES weather satellite.							
AC-160	September 9, 2001; 15:25:05	Atlas IIAS	VAFB SLC-3E	NROL-13	6,500 kg	LEO	NRO	Success
AC-160	Two Naval Ocean Surveillance System satellites; also known as Intruder 5A and 5B.							
AC-162	October 11, 2001; 02:32	Atlas IIAS	CCAFS SLC-36B	NROL-12		GTO	NRO	Success
AC-162	Third third-generation SDS military communications satellite; also known as QUASAR 14.							
=== 2002 ===
Flight №	Date / time (UTC)	Rocket	Launch site	Payload	Payload mass	Orbit	Customer	Launch outcome
AC-204	February 21, 2002; 12:43:00	Atlas IIIB	CCAFS SLC-36B	Echostar 7		GTO	EchoStar	Success
AC-204	Commercial communications satellite.							
AC-143	March 8, 2002; 22:59	Atlas IIA	CCAFS SLC-36A	TDRS-I	3,180 kg	GTO	NASA	Success
AC-143	Ninth NASA Tracking Data Relay Satellite.							
AV-001	August 21, 2002; 22:05:00	Atlas V 401	CCAFS SLC-41	Hot Bird 6	3,905 kg	GTO	Eutelsat	Success
AV-001	Commercial communications satellite; first Atlas V launch.							
AC-159	September 18, 2002; 22:04	Atlas IIAS	CCAFS SLC-36A	Hispasat 1D	3,250 kg	GTO	Hispasat	Success
AC-159	Commercial communications satellite.							
AC-144	December 5, 2002; 02:42	Atlas IIA	CCAFS SLC-36A	TDRS-J	3,180 kg	GTO	NASA	Success
AC-144	Tenth NASA Tracking Data Relay Satellite.							
=== 2003 ===
Flight №	Date / time (UTC)	Rocket, Configuration	Launch site	Payload	Payload mass	Orbit	Customer	Launch outcome
AC-205	April 12, 2003; 00:47	Atlas IIIB	CCAFS SLC-36B	Asiasat 4		GTO	AsiaSat	Success
AC-205	Commercial television satellite.							
AV-002	May 14, 2003; 22:10	Atlas V 401	CCAFS SLC-41	HellasSat-2		GTO	Hellas Sat	Success
AV-002	Commercial communications satellite.							
AV-003	July 17, 2003; 23:45	Atlas V 521	CCAFS SLC-41	Rainbow 1		GTO	Cablevision	Success
AV-003	Direct broadcast satellite; first Atlas V flight with 5-meter fairing.							
AC-164	December 2, 2003; 10:04	Atlas IIAS	VAFB SLC-3E	NROL-18	6,500 kg	LEO	NRO	Success
AC-164	Two Naval Ocean Surveillance System satellites; also known as Intruder 6A and 6B.							
AC-203	December 18, 2003; 02:30	Atlas IIIB	CCAFS SLC-36B	UFO 11		GTO	USAF	Success
AC-203	Eleventh Ultra High Frequency military communications satellite.							
=== 2004 ===
Flight №	Date / time (UTC)	Rocket	Launch site	Payload	Payload mass	Orbit	Customer	Launch outcome
AC-165	February 5, 2004; 23:46	Atlas IIAS	CCAFS SLC-36A	AMC-10	2,315 kg	GTO		Success
AC-165	Commercial communications satellite.							
AC-202	March 13, 2004; 05:40	Atlas IIIA	CCAFS SLC-36B	MBSAT-1		GTO		Success
AC-202	Commercial communications satellite.							
AC-163	April 16, 2004; 00:45	Atlas IIAS	CCAFS SLC-36A	Superbird 6	3,100 kg	GTO		Success
AC-163	Commercial communications satellite; transfer orbit was perturbed by the Moon, resulting in an extremely low perigee, permanently damaging the satellite.							
AC-166	May 19, 2004; 22:22	Atlas IIAS	CCAFS SLC-36B	AMC-11	2,315 kg	GTO		Success
AC-166	Commercial communications satellite.							
AC-167	August 31, 2004; 23:17	Atlas IIAS	CCAFS SLC-36A	NROL-1		Molniya		Success
AC-167	Fourth third-generation SDS military communications satellite.							
AV-005	December 17, 2004; 12:07:00	Atlas V 521	CCAFS SLC-41	AMC-16	4,065 kg	GTO		Success
AV-005	Commercial communications satellite.							
=== 2005 ===
Flight №	Date / time (UTC)	Rocket	Launch site	Payload	Payload mass	Orbit	Customer	Launch outcome
AC-206	February 3, 2005; 07:41	Atlas IIIB	CCAFS SLC-36B	NROL-23	6,500 kg	LEO		Success
AC-206	Two Naval Ocean Surveillance System satellites; also known as Intruder 7A and 7B. Final Atlas III launch, final launch of a direct evolution of the Atlas missile, and final launch from LC-36 before Blue Origin leasing the pad.							
AV-004	March 11, 2005; 21:42	Atlas V 431	CCAFS SLC-41	Inmarsat-4 F1	5,959 kg	GTO		Success
AV-004	Commercial mobile communications satellite.							
AV-007	August 12, 2005; 11:43:00	Atlas V 401	CCAFS SLC-41	MRO	2,180 kg	Heliocentric	NASA	Success
AV-007	NASA Mars imaging probe. First interplanetary Atlas V launch.							
=== 2006 ===
Flight №	Date / time (UTC)	Rocket	Launch site	Payload	Payload mass	Orbit	Customer	Launch outcome
AV-010	19 January 2006, 19:00:00	Atlas V 551/Star-48B	CCAFS SLC-41	New Horizons	478 kg	Galactocentric	NASA	Success
AV-010	NASA Pluto/Kuiper Belt exploration probe; first spacecraft ever directly launched on an interstellar trajectory; first Atlas V 551.							
AV-008	20 April 2006, 20:27:00	Atlas V 411	CCAFS SLC-41	Astra 1KR	4332 kg	GTO	SES	Success
AV-008	Commercial communications satellite; final Atlas launch for ILS.							
=== 2007 ===
Flight №	Date / time (UTC)	Rocket	Launch site	Payload	Payload mass	Orbit	Customer	Launch outcome
AV-013	March 9, 2007; 03:10	Atlas V 401	CCAFS SLC-41	STP-1		LEO	USAF	Success
AV-013	USAF rideshare mission; included Orbital Express, MidSTAR-1, FalconSAT-3 and CFESat.							
AV-009	June 15, 2007; 15:11	Atlas V 401	CCAFS SLC-41	NROL-30	6,500 kg	LEO	USAF	Partial failure
AV-009	Two Naval Ocean Surveillance System satellites; Centaur upper stage shut down early, leaving the payload in a suboptimal orbit.							
AV-011	October 11, 2007; 00:22	Atlas V 421	CCAFS SLC-41	WGS-1	5,987 kg	GTO	USAF	Success
AV-011	First Wideband Global SATCOM military communications satellite; first Atlas V 421.							
AV-015	December 10, 2007; 22:05	Atlas V 401	CCAFS SLC-41	NROL-24		Molniya	NRO	Success
AV-015	Fifth SDS military communications satellite; also known as QUASAR 16.							
=== 2008 ===
Flight №	Date / time (UTC)	Rocket	Launch site	Payload	Payload mass	Orbit	Customer	Launch outcome
AV-006	March 13, 2008; 10:02	Atlas V 411	VAFB SLC-3E	NROL-28	3,900 kg	Molniya	US NRO	Success
AV-006	Fifth Trumpet SIGINT satellite.							
AV-014	April 14, 2008; 20:12:00	Atlas V 421	CCAFS SLC-41	ICO G1	6,634 kg	GTO	ICO	Success
AV-014	Commercial communications satellite; heaviest commercial satellite ever launched at the time.							
=== 2009 ===
Flight №	Date / time (UTC)	Rocket	Launch site	Payload	Payload mass	Orbit	Customer	Launch outcome
AV-016	April 4, 2009; 00:31	Atlas V 421	CCAFS SLC-41	WGS-2	5,987 kg	GTO	USAF	Success
AV-016	Second Wideband Global SATCOM military communications satellite.							
AV-020	June 18, 2009, 17:32	Atlas V 401	CCAFS SLC-41	LRO/LCROSS		TLI		Success
AV-020	NASA Lunar imager and spectroscopy spacecraft; Centaur upper stage was used as a lunar impactor to provide data for LCROSS.							
AV-018	September 8, 2009, 21:35	Atlas V 401	CCAFS SLC-41	Palladium At Night		GTO	NRO	Success
AV-018	Classified SIGINT communications interception satellite; also known as Nemesis 1.							
AV-017	October 18, 2009, 16:12	Atlas V 401	VAFB SLC-3E	DMSP-5D3 F18	1,200 kg	SSO		Success
AV-017	Eighteenth DMSP military weather satellite.							
AV-024	November 23, 2009, 06:55	Atlas V 431	CCAFS SLC-41	Intelsat 14	5,663 kg	GTO		Success
AV-024	Commercial communications satellite; hosts DoD IRIS secondary payload.							

== Photo gallery ==
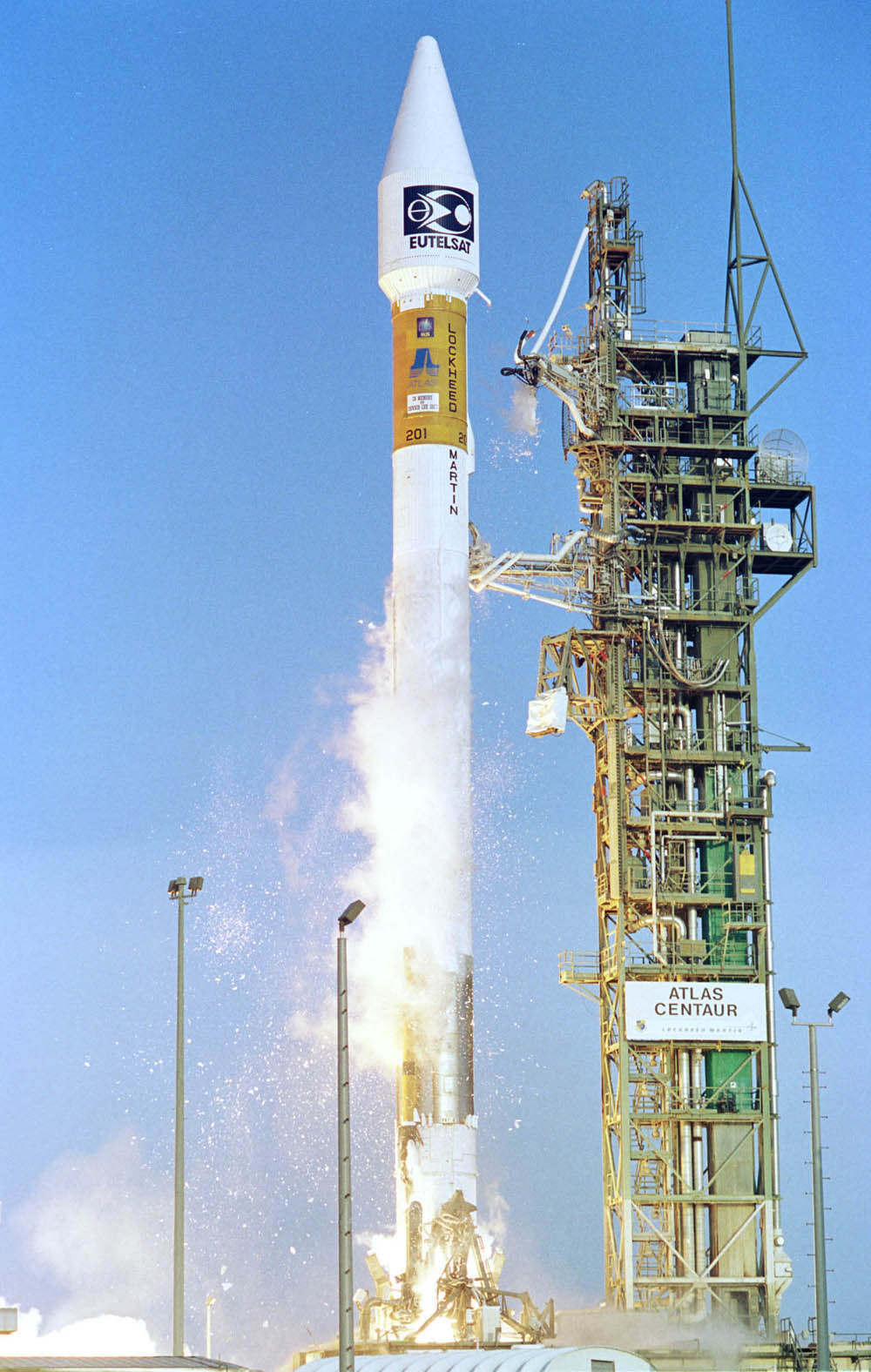
First launch of the Atlas IIIA, carrying Eutelsat 36A

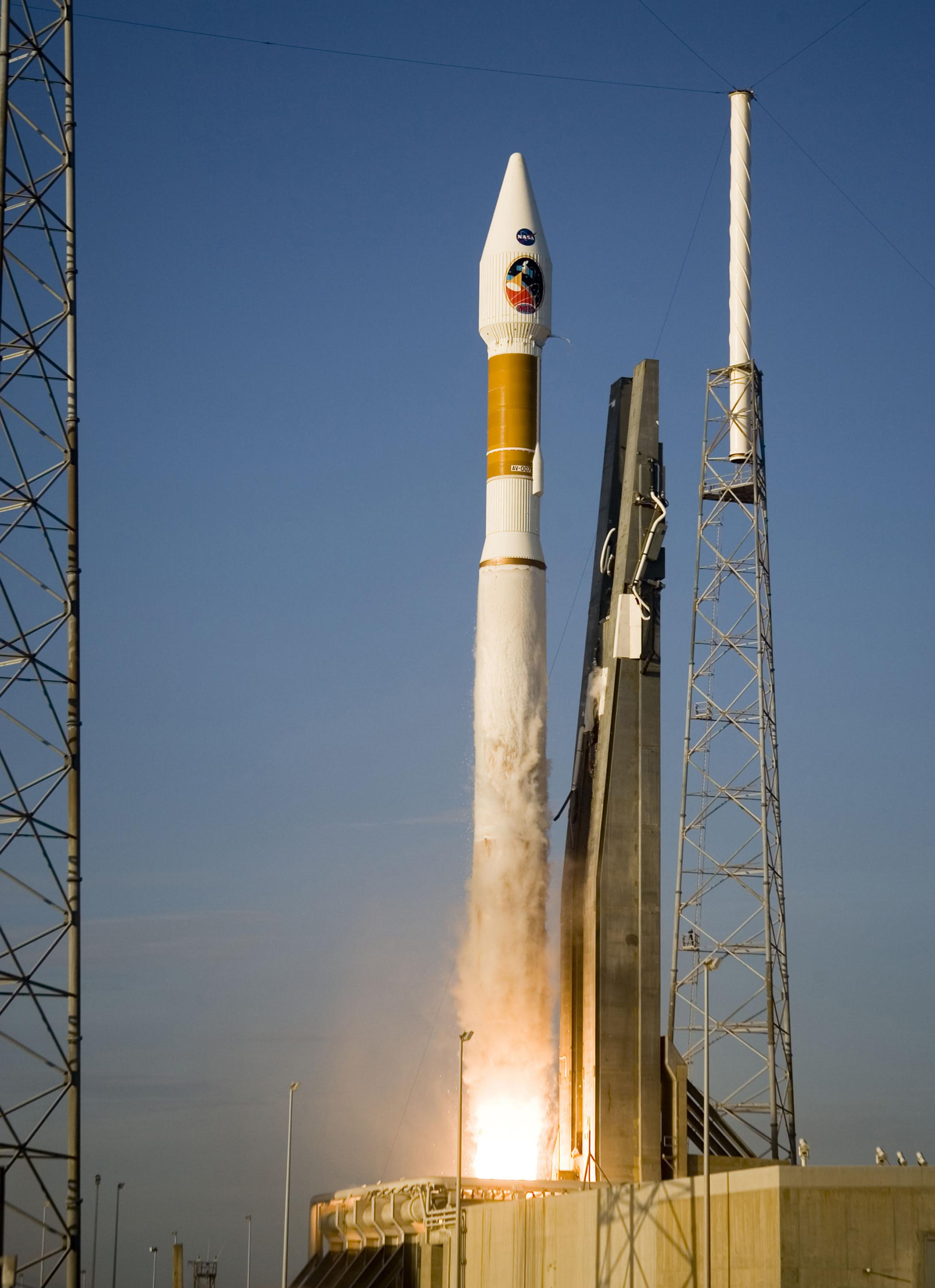
Mars Reconnaissance Orbiter launches on an Atlas V 401

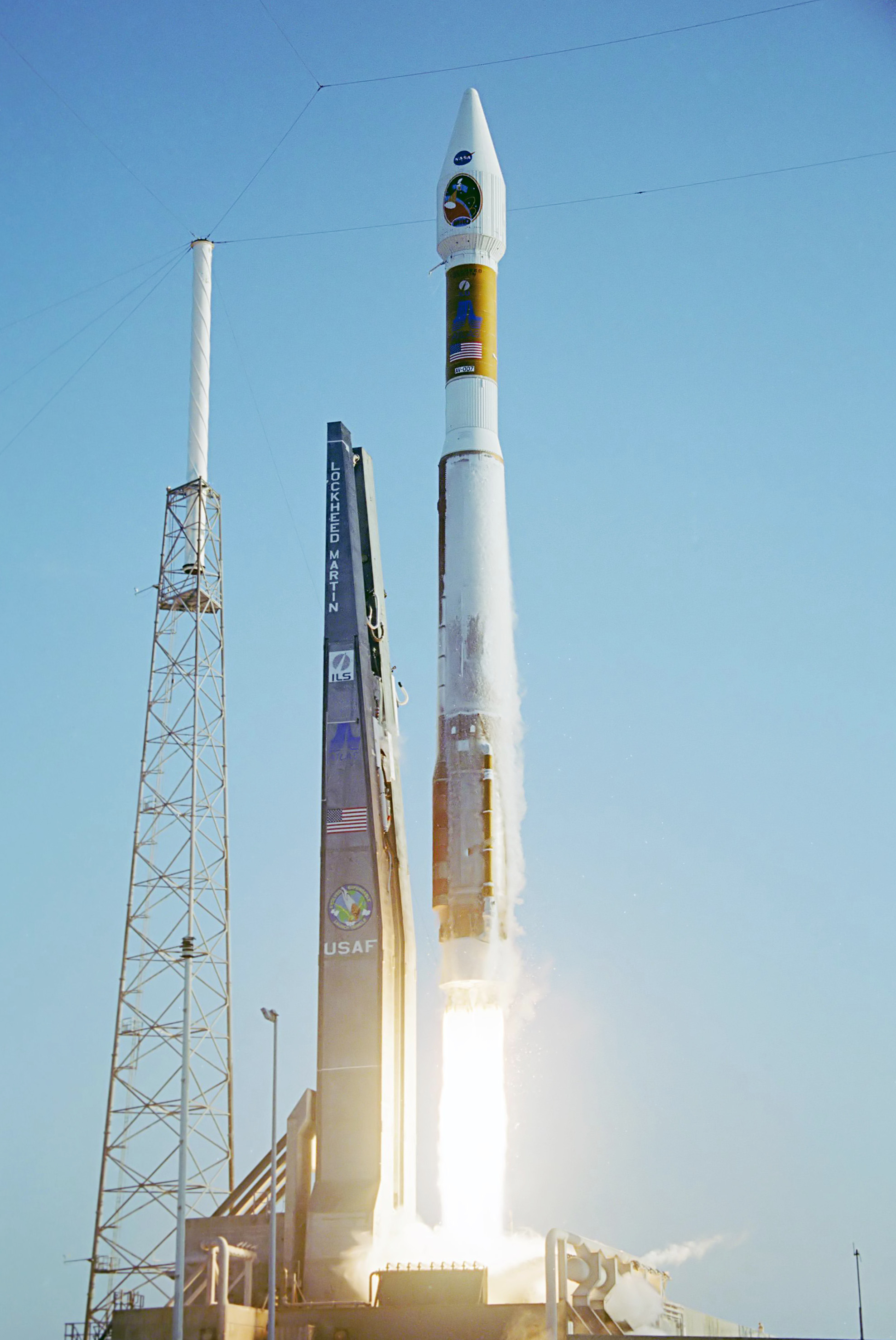
Mars Reconnaissance Orbiter launches on an Atlas V 401

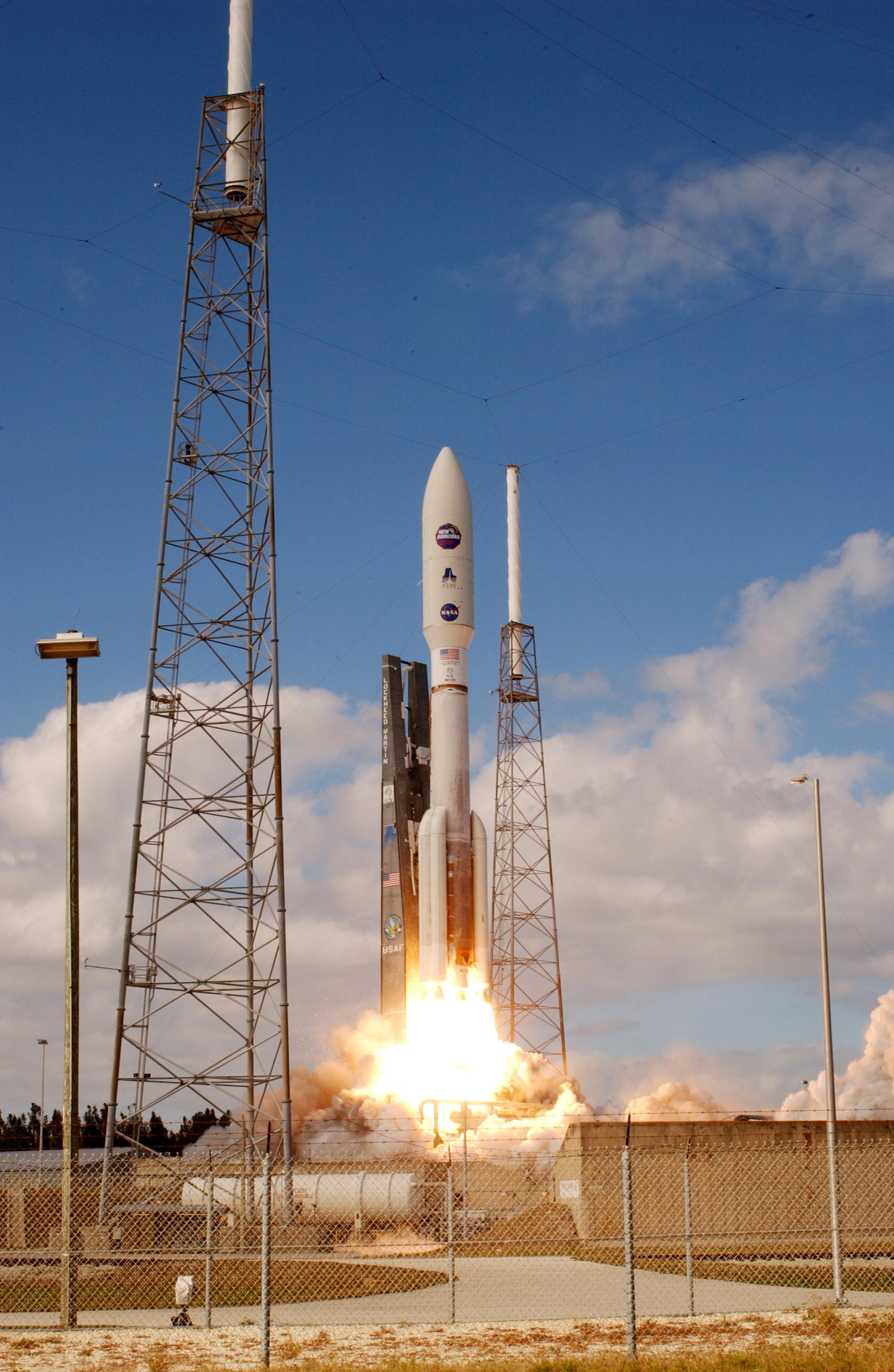
New Horizons launches on an Atlas V 551
