= TDRS-8 =

American communications satellite

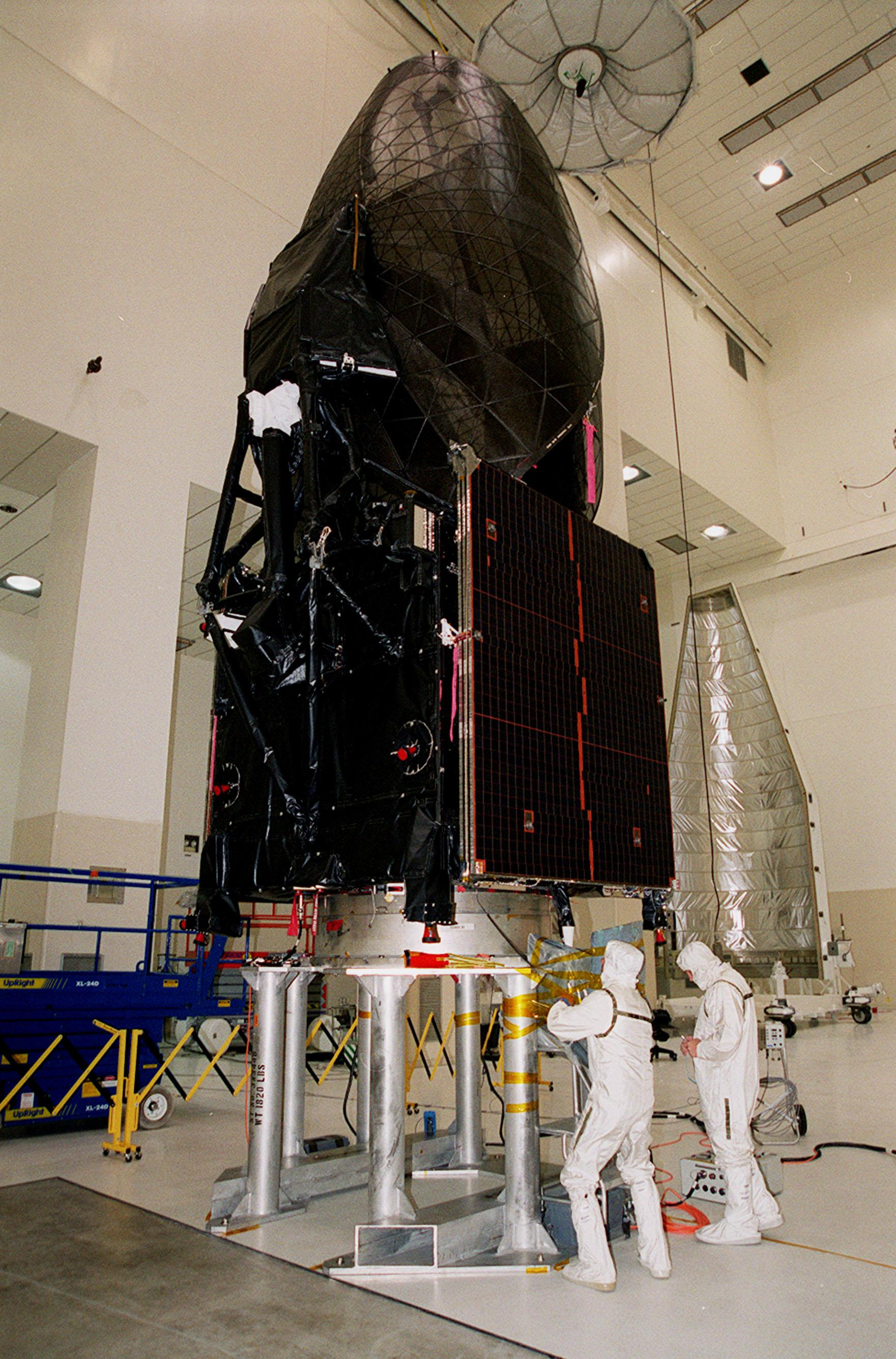
- TDRS-H undergoing processing before launch
- Mission type: Communication
- Operator: NASA
- COSPAR ID: 2000-034A
- SATCAT no.: 26388
- Mission duration: Planned: 11 years Elapsed: 25 years, 3 months, 20 days

Spacecraft properties
- Bus: BSS-601
- Manufacturer: Boeing
- Launch mass: 3197 kg
- Dimensions: 21.0 metres long 13.1 metres wide
- Power: 2300 watts

Start of mission
- Launch date: 30 June 2000, 12:56:00 UTC
- Rocket: Atlas IIA
- Launch site: Cape Canaveral, LC-36A
- Contractor: ILS

Orbital parameters
- Reference system: Geocentric orbit
- Regime: Geostationary orbit
- Longitude: 171.0° West (2000-?); 270.8° West
- Epoch: 1 July 2000
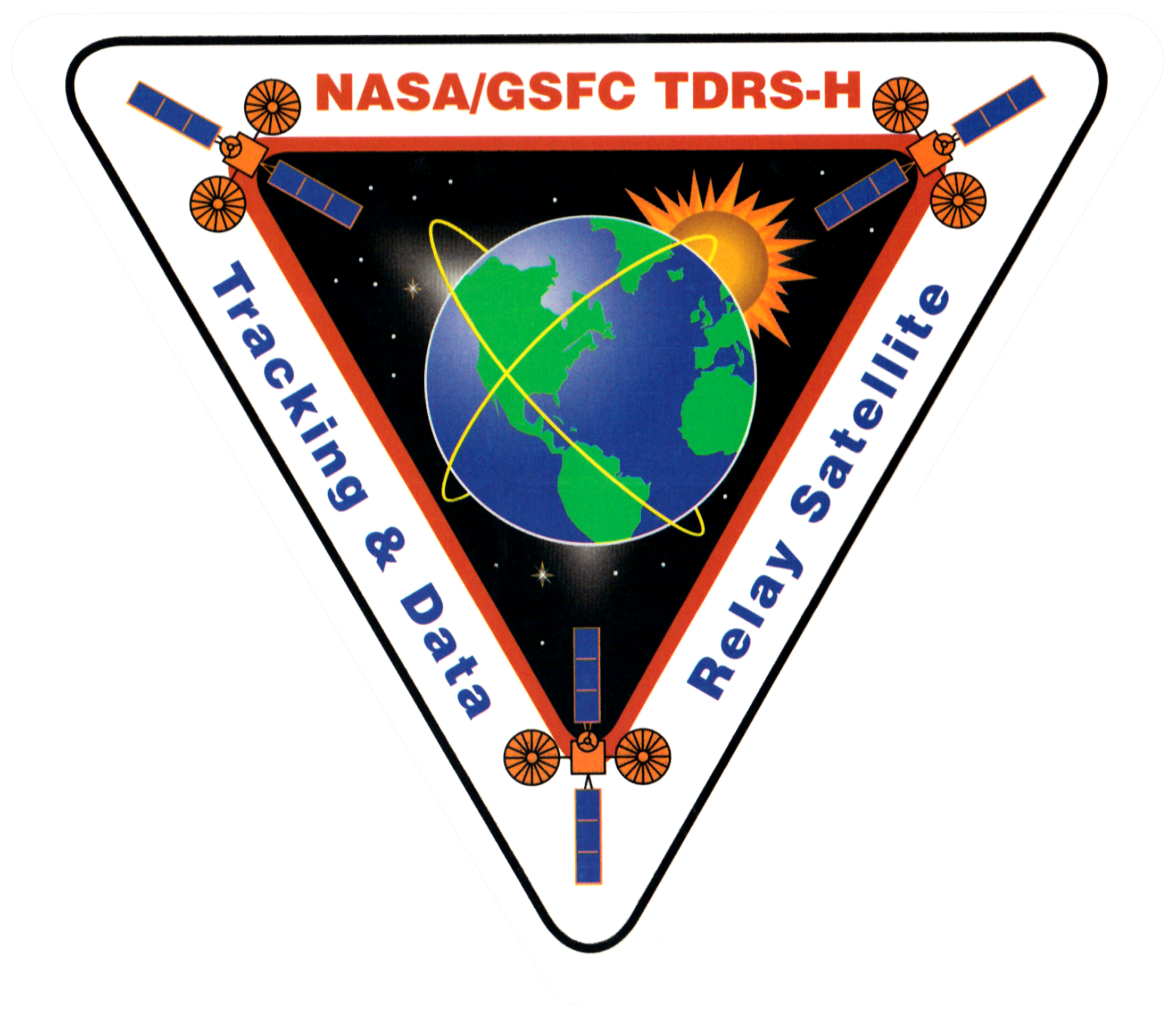
- Tracking and Data Relay Satellite; Second-generation

TDRS-8, known before launch as TDRS-H, is an American communications satellite, of second generation, which is operated by NASA as part of the Tracking and Data Relay Satellite System. It was constructed by Boeing and is based on the BSS-601 satellite bus.

== Launch ==
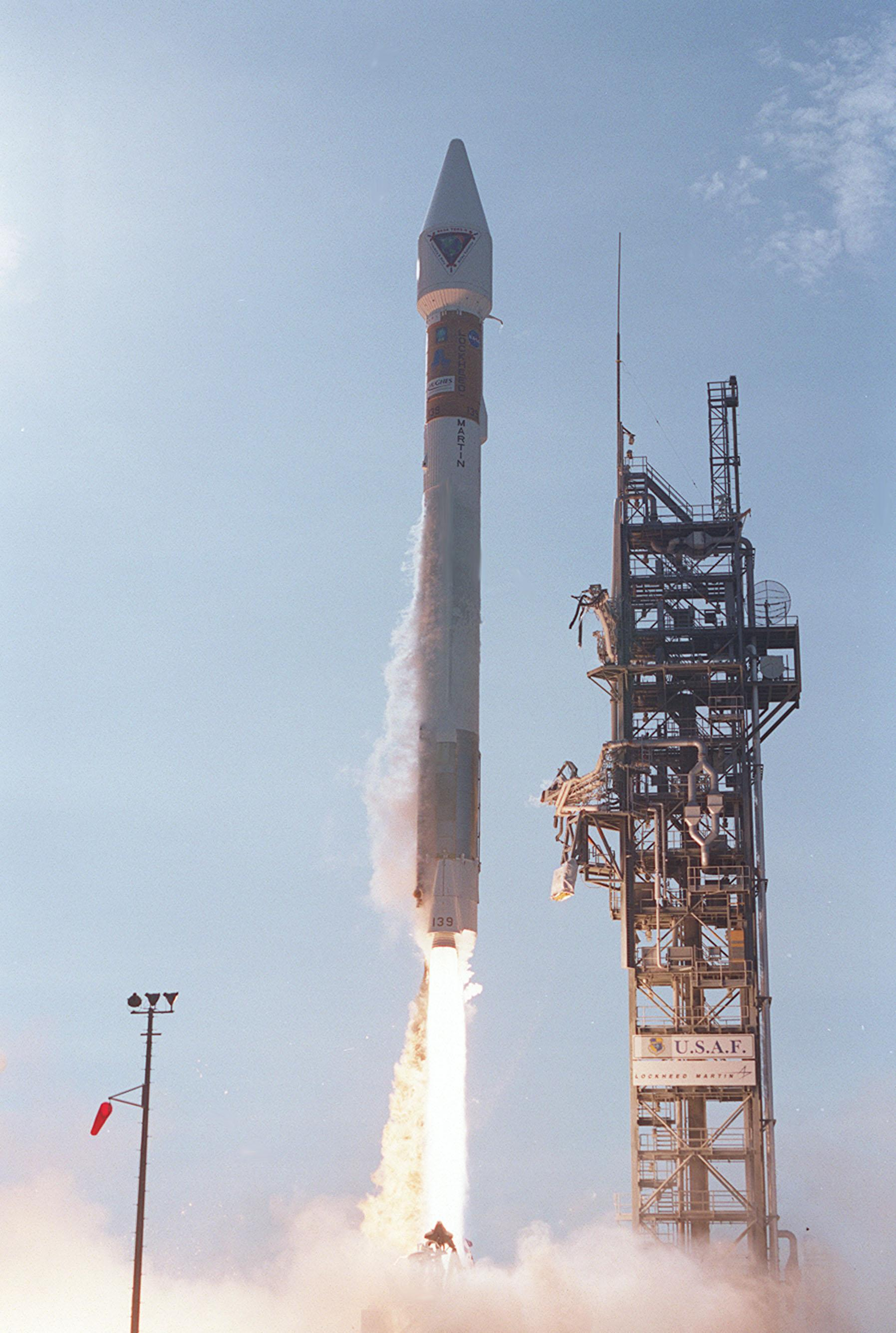
The launch of TDRS-H

Its launch was contracted by International Launch Services, using an Atlas IIA launch vehicle. The launch occurred on 30 June 2000, at 12:56:00 UTC from Launch Complex 36A at the Cape Canaveral Air Force Station.

It was the first Tracking and Data Relay Satellite, of second generation, to be launched. Due to a malfunction of the multiple-access phased array antenna the spacecraft did not provide the expected level of performance for eighteen of the communications services that it was to provide. The same problem was found and corrected on the TDRS-9 and TDRS-10 satellites prior to their launches.

== Orbit ==
Following its launch, it raised itself into geostationary orbit by means of its onboard R-4D apogee motor, and was positioned at 150.0° West for on-orbit testing. After testing was complete, it was moved to 171.0° East from where it provides communications services to spacecraft in Earth orbit, including the Space Shuttle and International Space Station.

Location of TDRS as of 26 May 2020

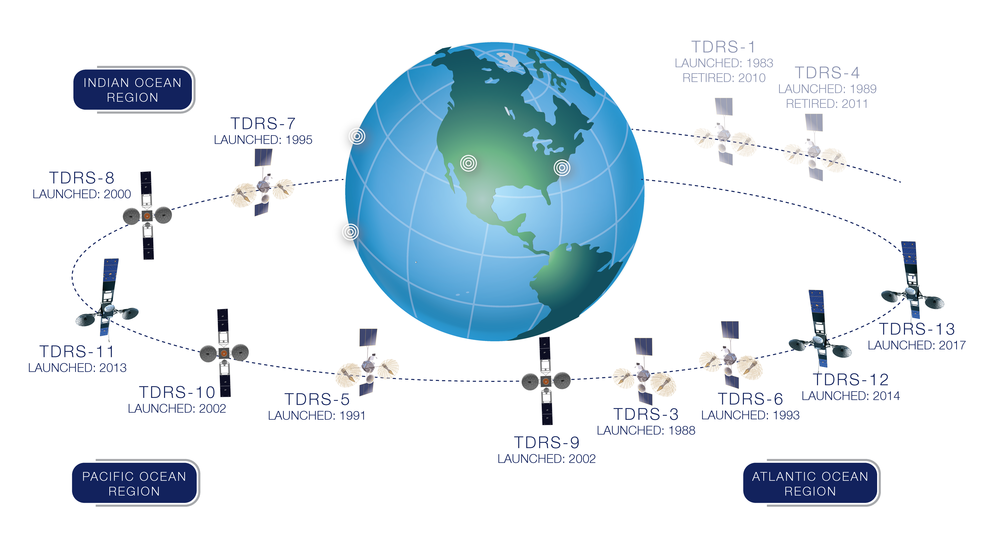
Location of TDRS as of 18 March 2019

== See also ==
- 2000 in spaceflight
- List of TDRS satellites
