= TDRS-13 =

American communications satellite

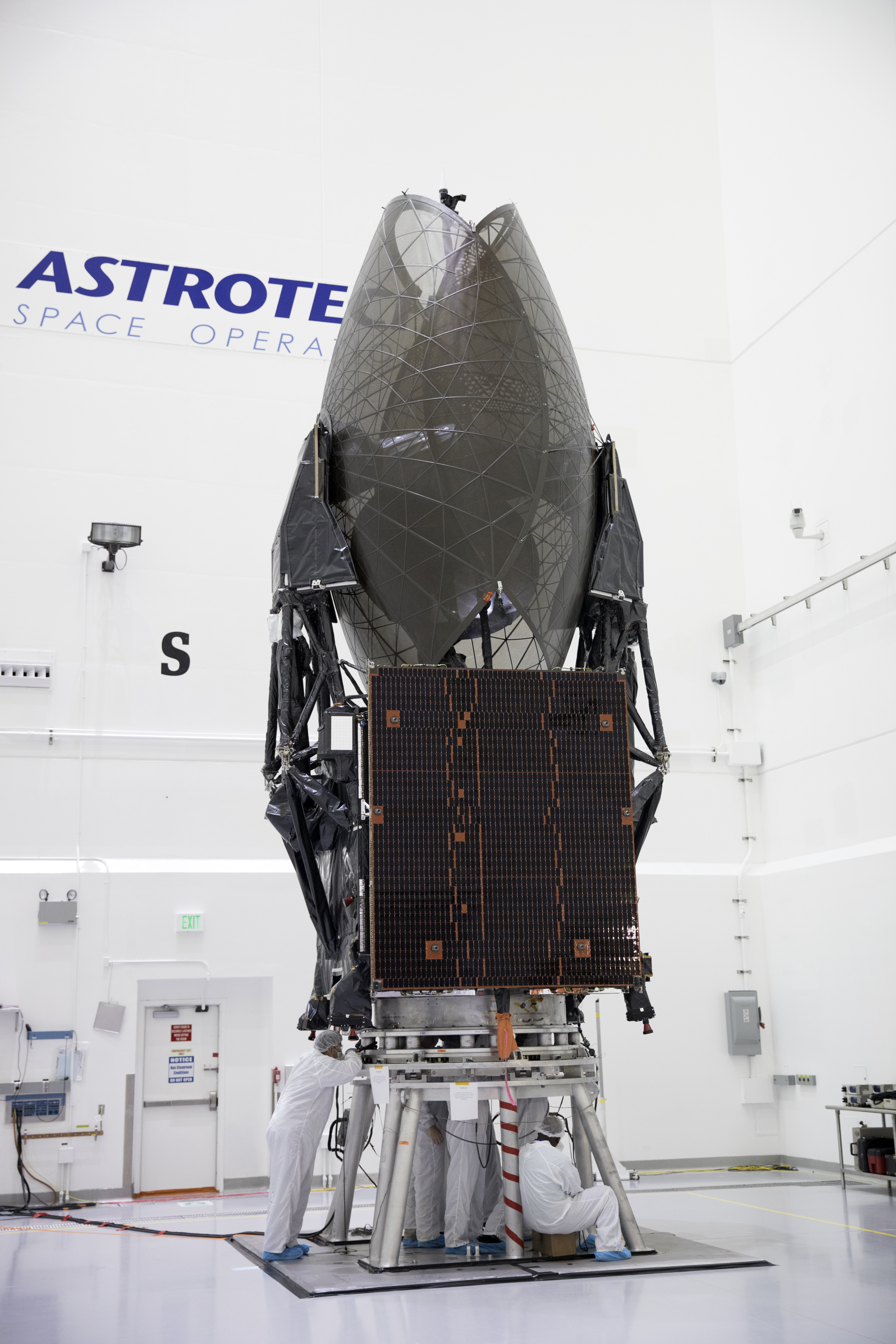
- TDRS-M at the Astrotech payload processing facility
- Mission type: Communications
- Operator: NASA
- COSPAR ID: 2017-047A
- SATCAT no.: 42915
- Mission duration: Planned: 15 years Elapsed: 7 years, 11 months, 25 days

Spacecraft properties
- Bus: BSS-601HP
- Manufacturer: Boeing
- Launch mass: 3,454 kg (7,615 lb)

Start of mission
- Launch date: 18 August 2017, 12:29 UTC
- Rocket: Atlas V 401
- Launch site: Cape Canaveral SLC-41
- Contractor: United Launch Alliance

Orbital parameters
- Reference system: Geocentric
- Regime: Geosynchronous orbit
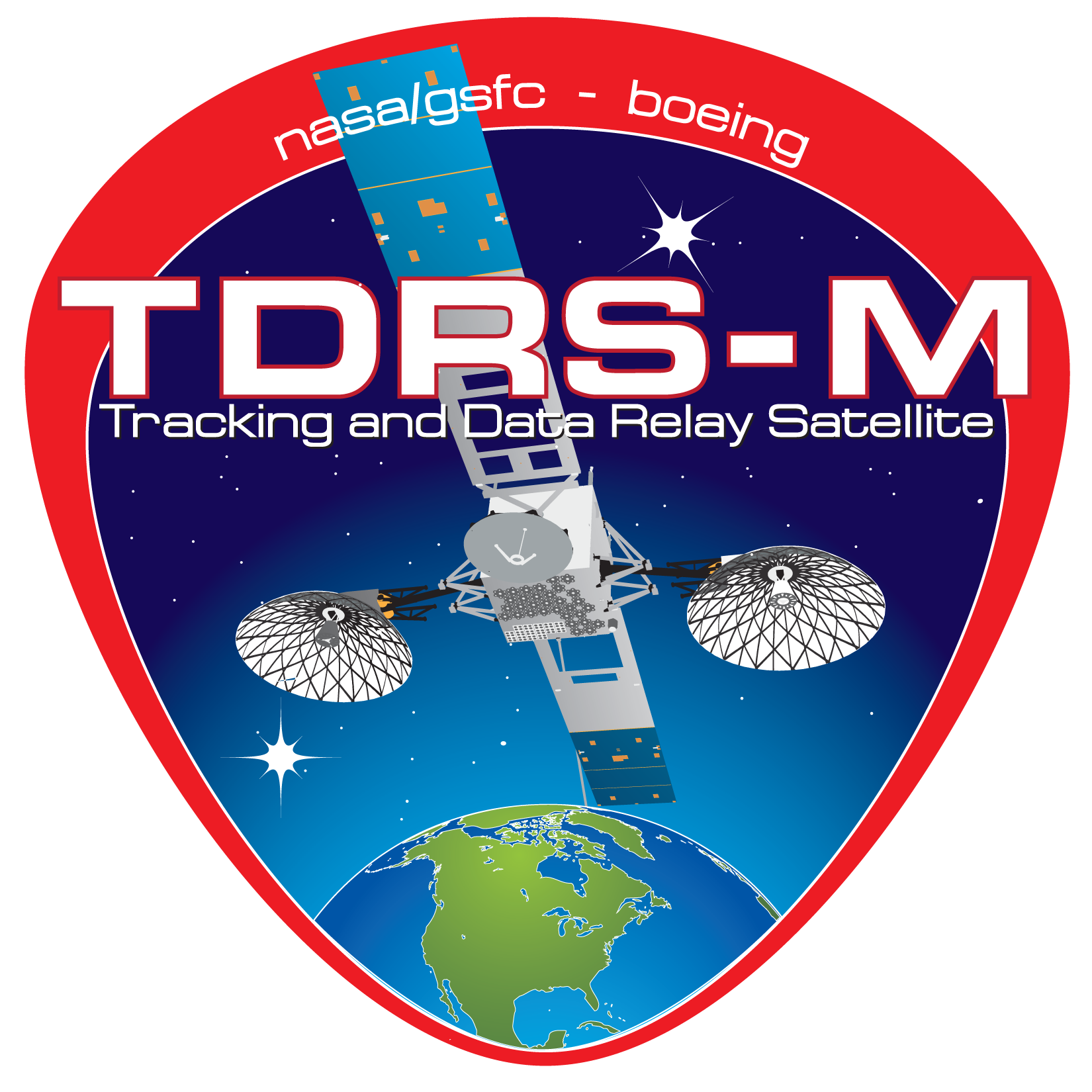
- Tracking and Data Relay Satellite; Third-generation

TDRS-13, known before launch as TDRS-M, is an American communications satellite operated by NASA as part of the Tracking and Data Relay Satellite System. The thirteenth Tracking and Data Relay Satellite, it is the third and final third-generation spacecraft to be launched, following the 2014 launch of TDRS-12.

== Spacecraft ==
TDRS-M was constructed by Boeing, based on the BSS-601HP satellite bus. Fully fueled, it has a mass of 3,454 kg (7,615 lb), with a design life of 15 years. It carries two steerable antennas capable of providing S, Ku and Ka band communications for other spacecraft, with an additional array of S-band transponders for lower-rate communications with five further satellites. The satellite is powered by two solar arrays, which produce 2.8 to 3.2 kilowatts of power, while an R-4D-11-300 engine is present to provide propulsion.

== Launch ==
In 2015, NASA contracted with United Launch Alliance to launch TDRS-M on an Atlas V 401 for $132.4 million. The spacecraft was launched on 18 August 2017 at 12:29 UTC (08:29 local time) from Space Launch Complex-41 at Cape Canaveral Air Force Station.

== Damage during final closeouts ==
On 15 July 2017, The TDRS-M space communications satellite was damaged during the encapsulation process at Astrotech Space Operations.

According to NASA's press release, "NASA and Boeing are reviewing an incident that occurred during final spacecraft closeout activities on the Tracking Data Relay Satellite (TDRS-M) mission at Astrotech Space Operations in Titusville, Florida, on July 14, involving the Omni S-band antenna." This incident did result in a launch delay.

Location of TDRS as of 22 May 2020

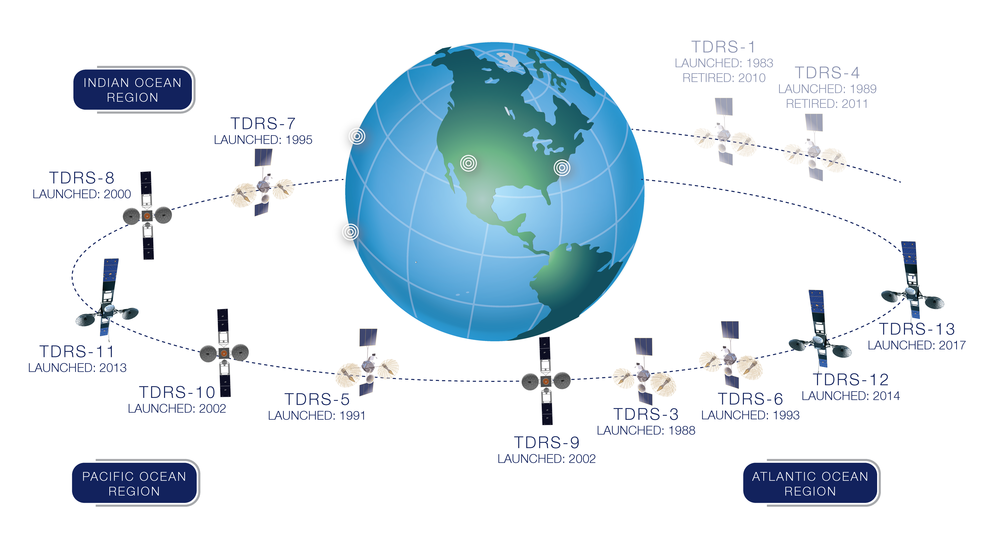
Location of TDRS as of March 2019

== See also ==
- List of TDRS satellites
