= List of TDRS satellites =

Location of TDRS as of 26 May 2020

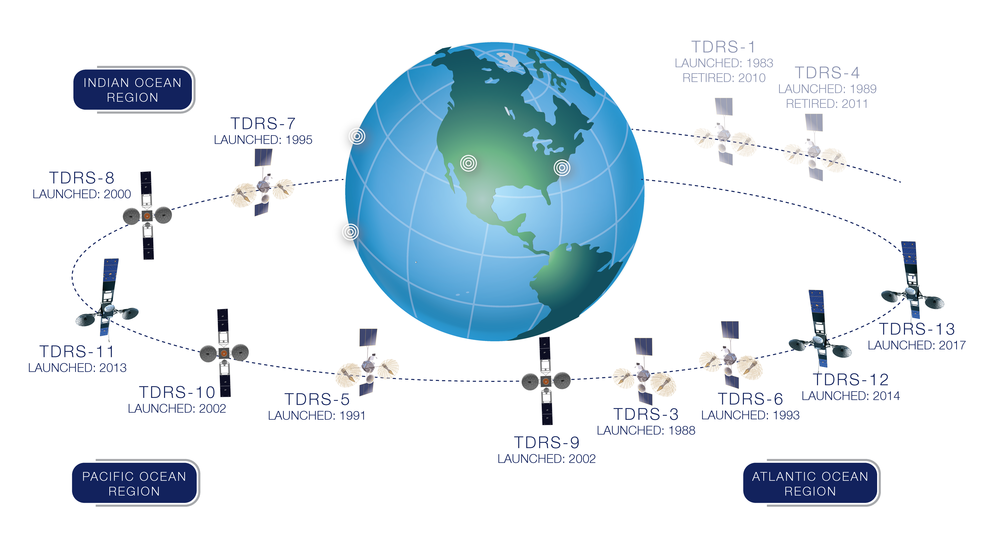
Location of TDRS as of March 2019

This is a list of Tracking and Data Relay Satellites. TDRS spacecraft are all in geostationary orbit and are operated by the United States National Aeronautics and Space Administration, and are used for communication between NASA facilities and spacecraft, including the Space Shuttle, Hubble Space Telescope, and International Space Station.

As of August 2025, 7 out of 12 TDRS satellites launched were operational, two (TDRS-3, TDRS-5) had been placed in storage, three (TDRS-1, TDRS-4 and TDRS-9) had been retired, and one (TDRS-B) had been lost in a launch failure.

== Satellites ==
Generation	Designation		Launch, UTC	Launch vehicle	Launch site	Longitude	Status	Retirement	Remarks
Generation	Launch	Operational	Launch, UTC	Launch vehicle	Launch site	Longitude	Status	Retirement	Remarks
First	TDRS-A	TDRS-1	4 April 1983; 18:30:00	Space Shuttle Challenger/IUS (STS-6)	Kennedy, LC-39A	41° W, 62° W, 171° W	Retired	27 June 2010	IUS malfunctioned, raised orbit using maneuvering thrusters. End of life October 2009. Placed in a graveyard orbit on 27 June 2010.
First	TDRS-B	N/A	28 January 1986; 16:38:00	Space Shuttle Challenger/IUS (STS-51-L)	Kennedy, LC-39B	N/A	Destroyed	28 January 1986; 16:39:13	Launch failure Shuttle disintegrated during ascent
First	TDRS-C	TDRS-3	29 September 1988; 15:37:00	Space Shuttle Discovery/IUS (STS-26R)	Kennedy, LC-39B	62° W	In storage	December 2011	
First	TDRS-D	TDRS-4	13 March 1989; 14:57:00	Space Shuttle Discovery/IUS (STS-29R)	Kennedy, LC-39B		Retired	April/May 2012	Placed in a graveyard orbit.
First	TDRS-E	TDRS-5	2 August 1991; 15:02:00	Space Shuttle Atlantis/IUS (STS-43)	Kennedy, LC-39A	167° W	In storage		
First	TDRS-F	TDRS-6	13 January 1993; 13:59:30	Space Shuttle Endeavour/IUS (STS-54)	Kennedy, LC-39B	46° W	Active		
First	TDRS-G	TDRS-7	13 July 1995; 13:41:55	Space Shuttle Discovery/IUS (STS-70)	Kennedy, LC-39B	85° E	Active		Replaced TDRS-B
Second	TDRS-H	TDRS-8	30 June 2000; 12:56	Atlas IIA	Canaveral, SLC-36A	89° E	Active		
Second	TDRS-I	TDRS-9	8 March 2002; 22:59	Atlas IIA	Canaveral, SLC-36A	12° W	Retired	5 January 2023	
Second	TDRS-J	TDRS-10	5 December 2002; 02:42	Atlas IIA	Canaveral, SLC-36A	171° W	Active		
Third	TDRS-K	TDRS-11	31 January 2013; 01:48:00	Atlas V 401	Canaveral, SLC-41	174° W	Active		USD350 million cost, paid to Boeing under a firm-fixed price (FFP) contract.
Third	TDRS-L	TDRS-12	24 January 2014; 02:33:00	Atlas V 401	Canaveral, SLC-41	41° W	Active		USD350 million cost, FFP contract.
Third	TDRS-M	TDRS-13	18 August 2017; 12:29:00	Atlas V 401	Canaveral, SLC-41	49° W	Active		USD289 million firm-fixed-price contract option with Boeing; option exercised in November 2011, ahead of expiry on 30 November 2012.
Third	TDRS-N						Cancelled		Option not exercised

== Gallery ==
Animation of TDRS-8 - TDRS-13

Oblique view

Oblique view - Earth fixed frame

Earth · TDRS-8 · TDRS-9 · TDRS-10 · TDRS-11 · TDRS-12 · TDRS-13
