= TDRS-12 =

American communications satellite

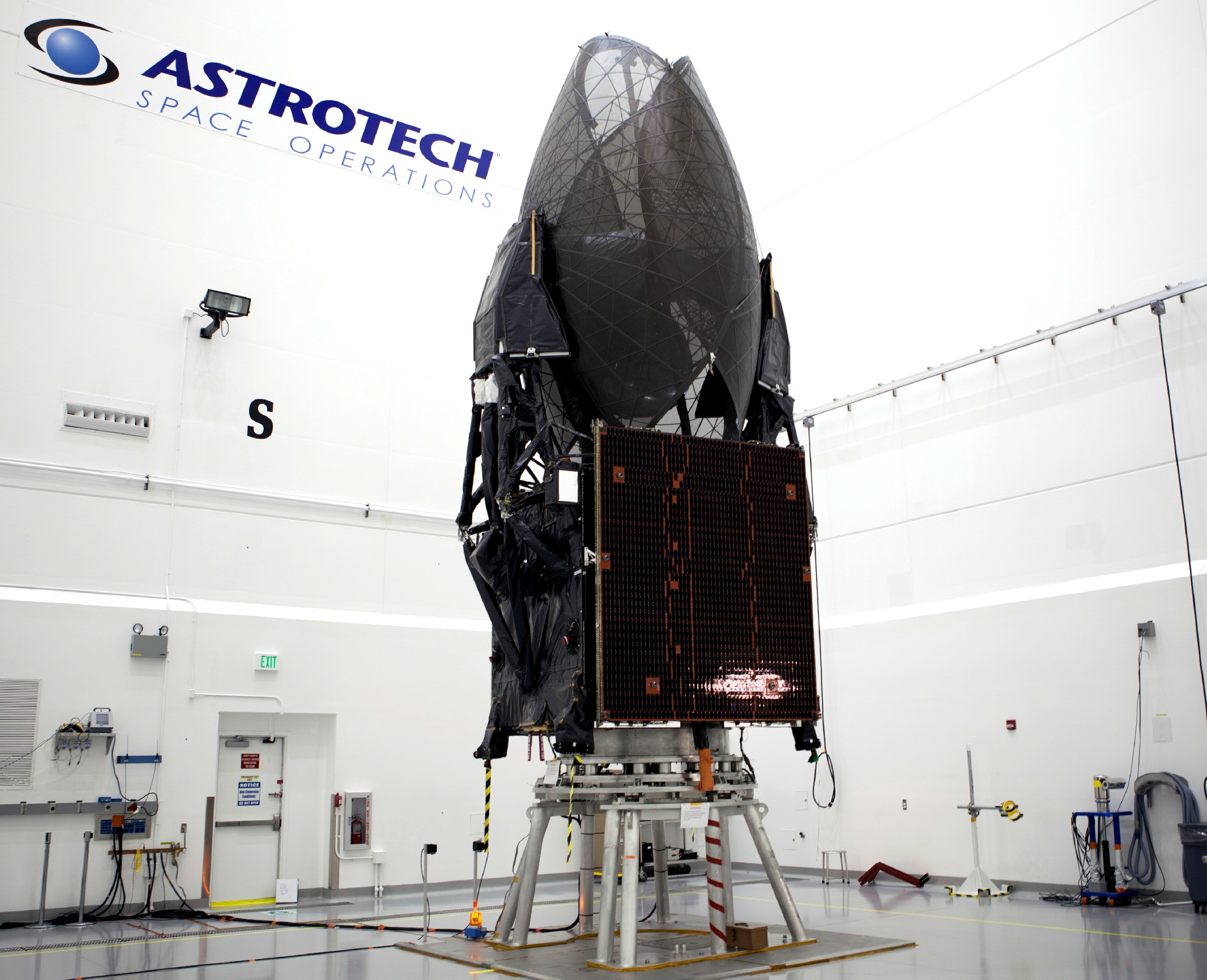
- TDRS-L at the Astrotech payload processing facility
- Mission type: Communications
- Operator: NASA
- COSPAR ID: 2014-004A
- SATCAT no.: 39504
- Mission duration: Planned: 15 years Elapsed: 11 years, 6 months, 19 days

Spacecraft properties
- Bus: BSS-601HP
- Manufacturer: Boeing
- Launch mass: 3,454 kg (7,615 lb)

Start of mission
- Launch date: 24 January 2014, 02:33 UTC
- Rocket: Atlas V 401
- Launch site: Cape Canaveral SLC-41
- Contractor: United Launch Alliance

Orbital parameters
- Reference system: Geocentric
- Regime: Geosynchronous orbit
- Perigee altitude: 35,785 kilometers (22,236 mi)
- Apogee altitude: 35,797 kilometers (22,243 mi)
- Inclination: 6.77 degrees
- Period: 1436.03 minutes
- Epoch: 22 January 2015, 07:10:47 UTC
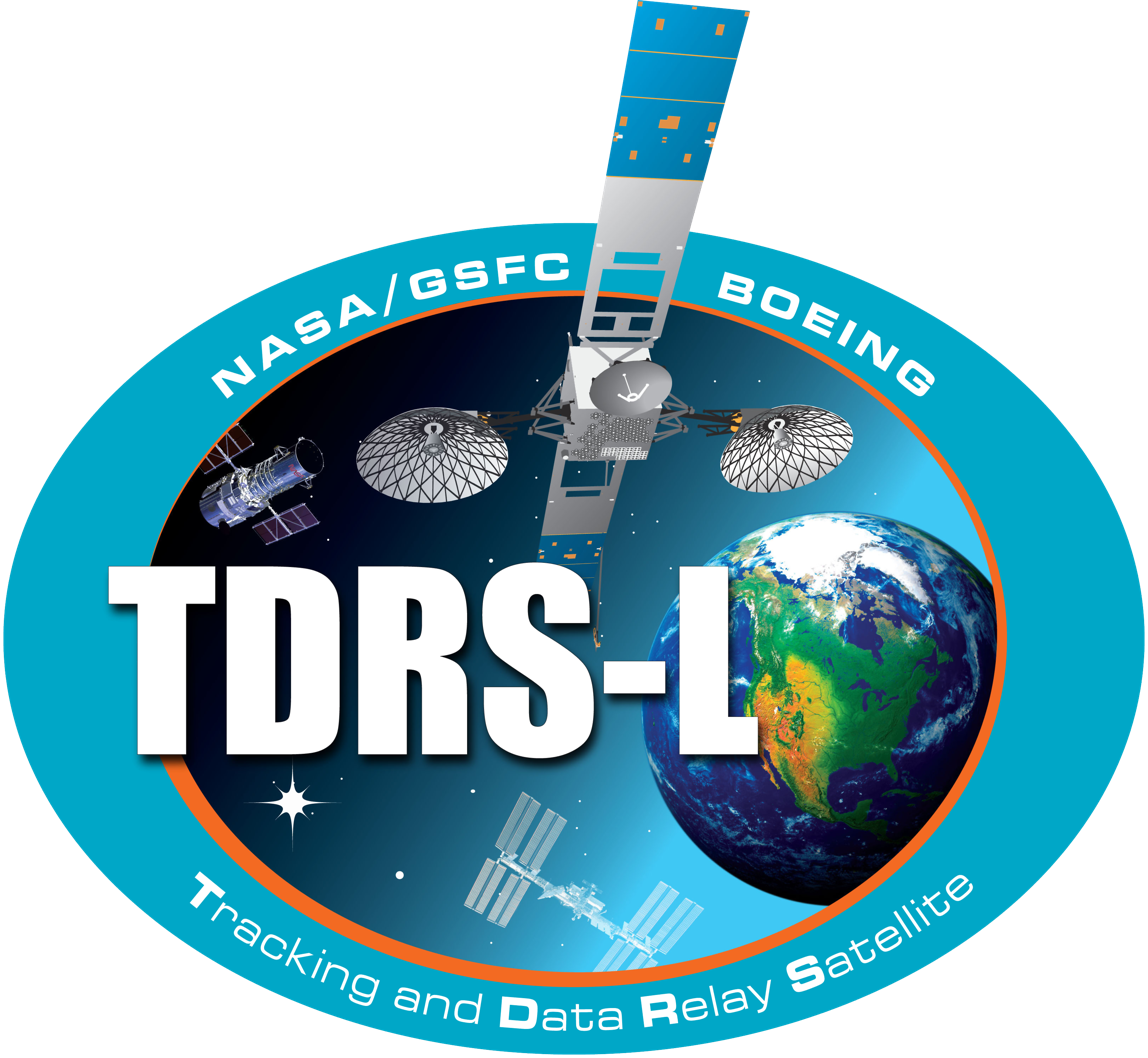
- Tracking and Data Relay Satellite; Third-generation

TDRS-12, known before launch as TDRS-L, is an American communications satellite operated by NASA as part of the Tracking and Data Relay Satellite System. The twelfth Tracking and Data Relay Satellite, it is the second third-generation spacecraft to be launched, following TDRS-11 in 2013.

== Spacecraft ==
TDRS-12 was constructed by Boeing, based on the BSS-601HP satellite bus. Fully fueled, it has a mass of 3,454 kg (7,615 lb), with a design life of 15 years. It carries two steerable antennas capable of providing S, Ku and Ka band communications for other spacecraft, with an additional array of S-band transponders for lower-rate communications with five further satellites. The satellite is powered by two solar arrays, which produce 2.8 to 3.2 kilowatts of power, while an R-4D-11-300 engine is present to provide propulsion.

== Launch ==
The United Launch Alliance was contracted to launch TDRS-12. The spacecraft was launched on 24 January 2014 at 02:33 UTC (21:33 local time on 23 January). An Atlas V rocket was used, flying in the 401 configuration, with tail number AV-043. After launch, TDRS-12 was deployed into a high-perigee geosynchronous transfer orbit. The spacecraft raised itself into a geosynchronous orbit using its onboard propulsion system.

== Gallery ==
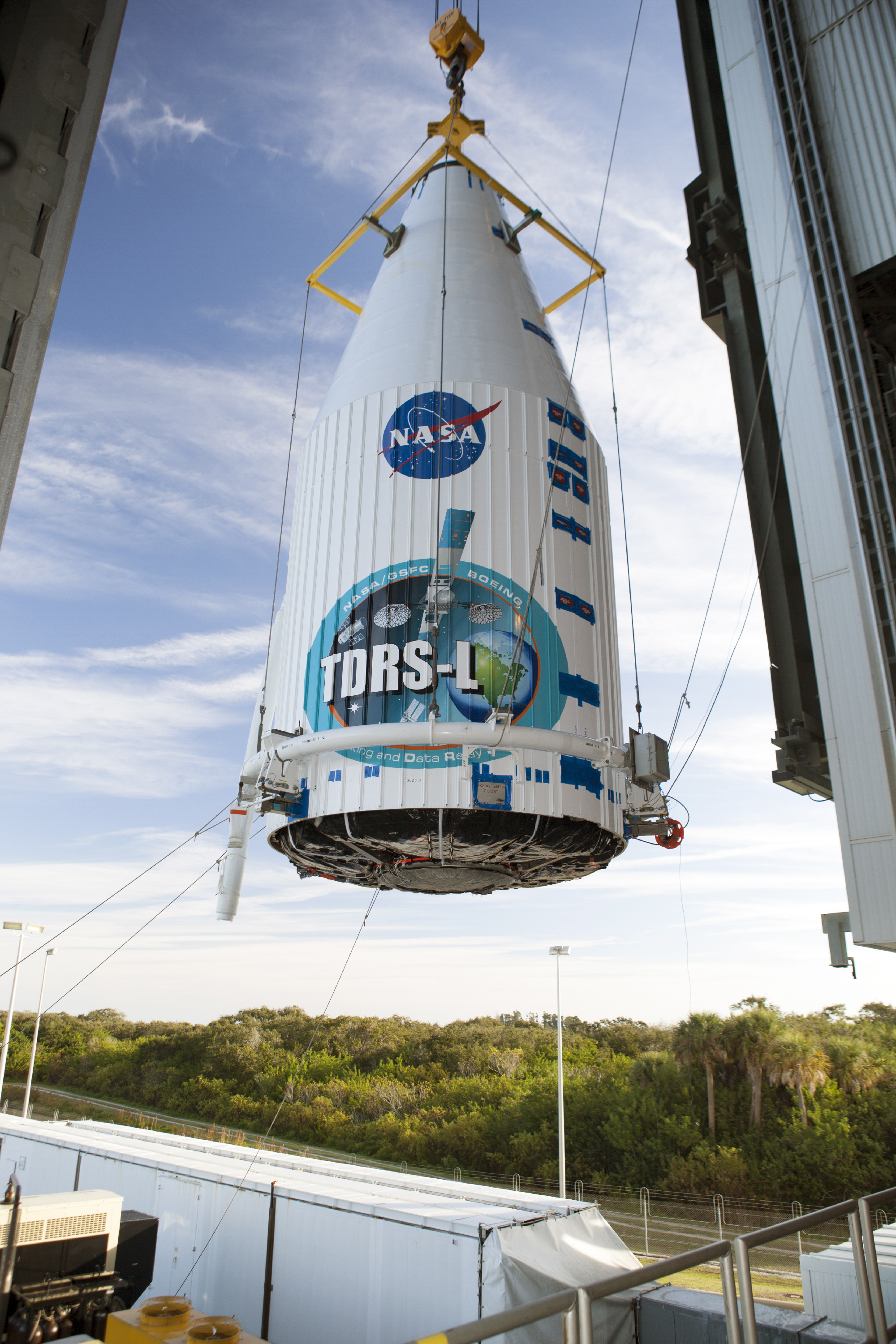

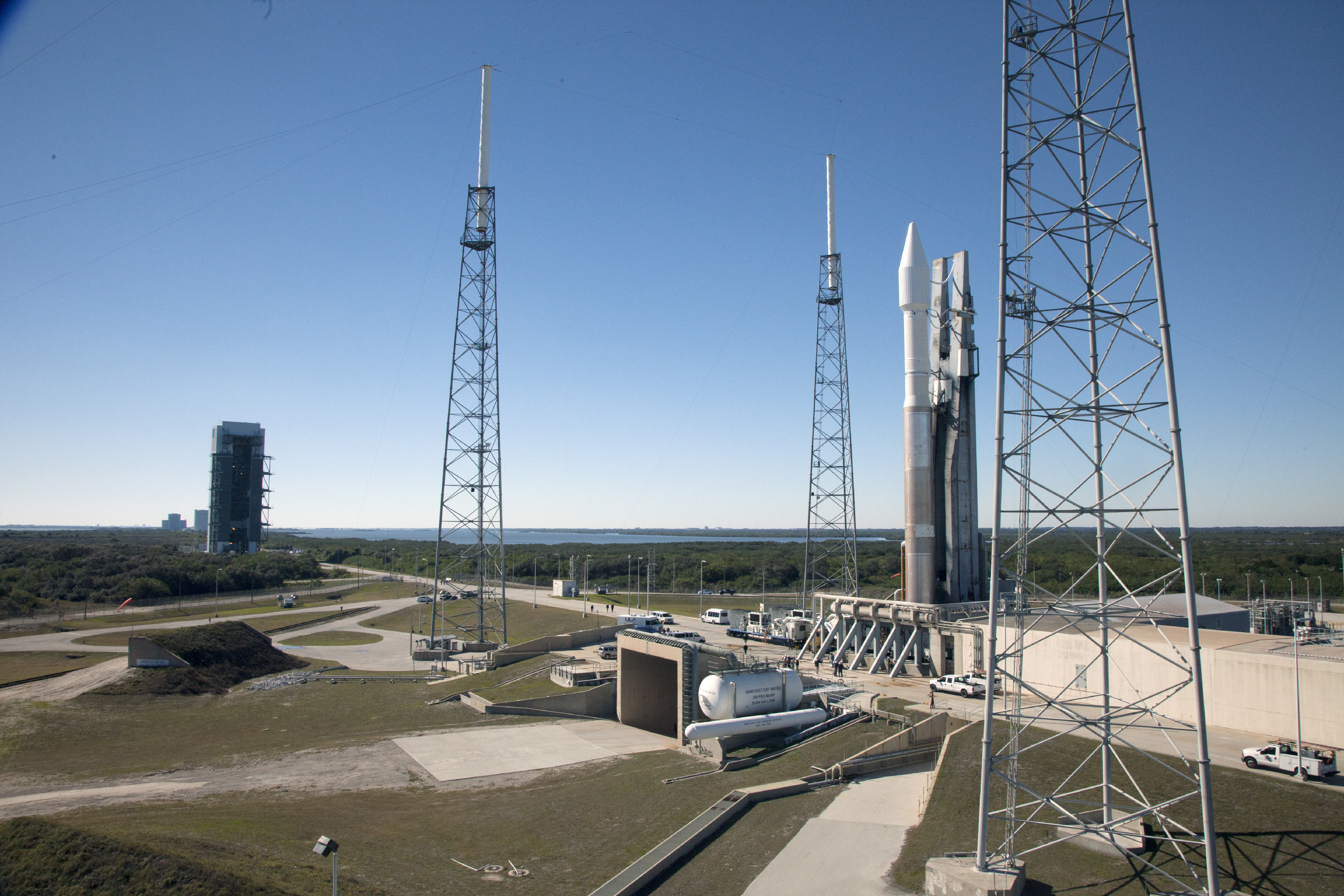

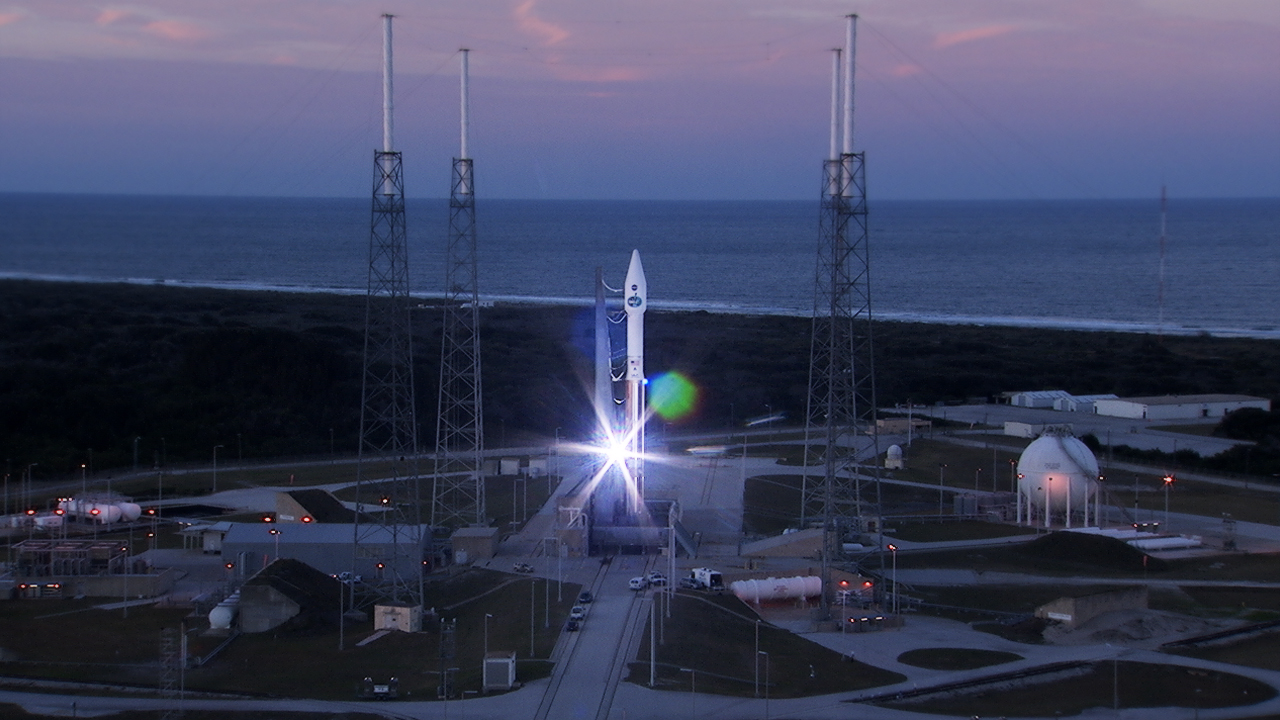

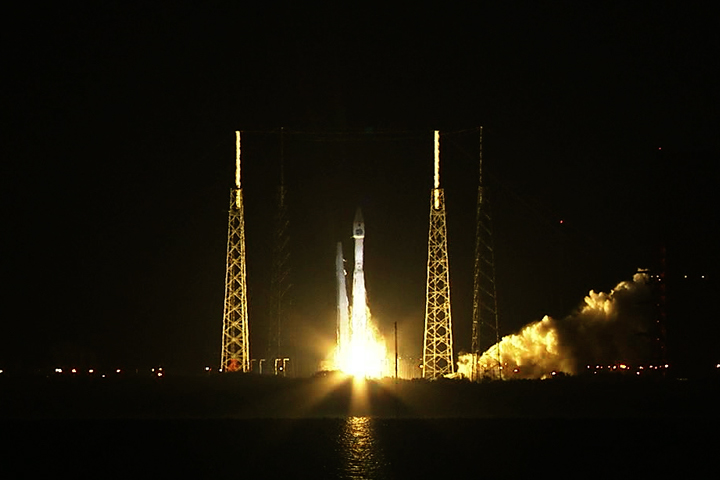

Location of TDRS as of 22 May 2020

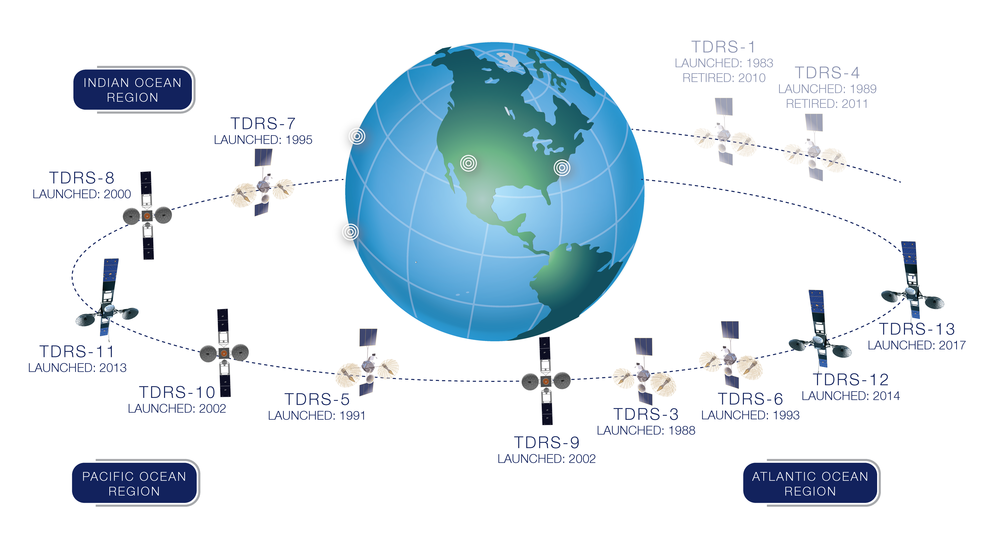
Location of TDRS as of March 2019

== See also ==
- List of TDRS satellites
