= TDRS-11 =

American communications satellite

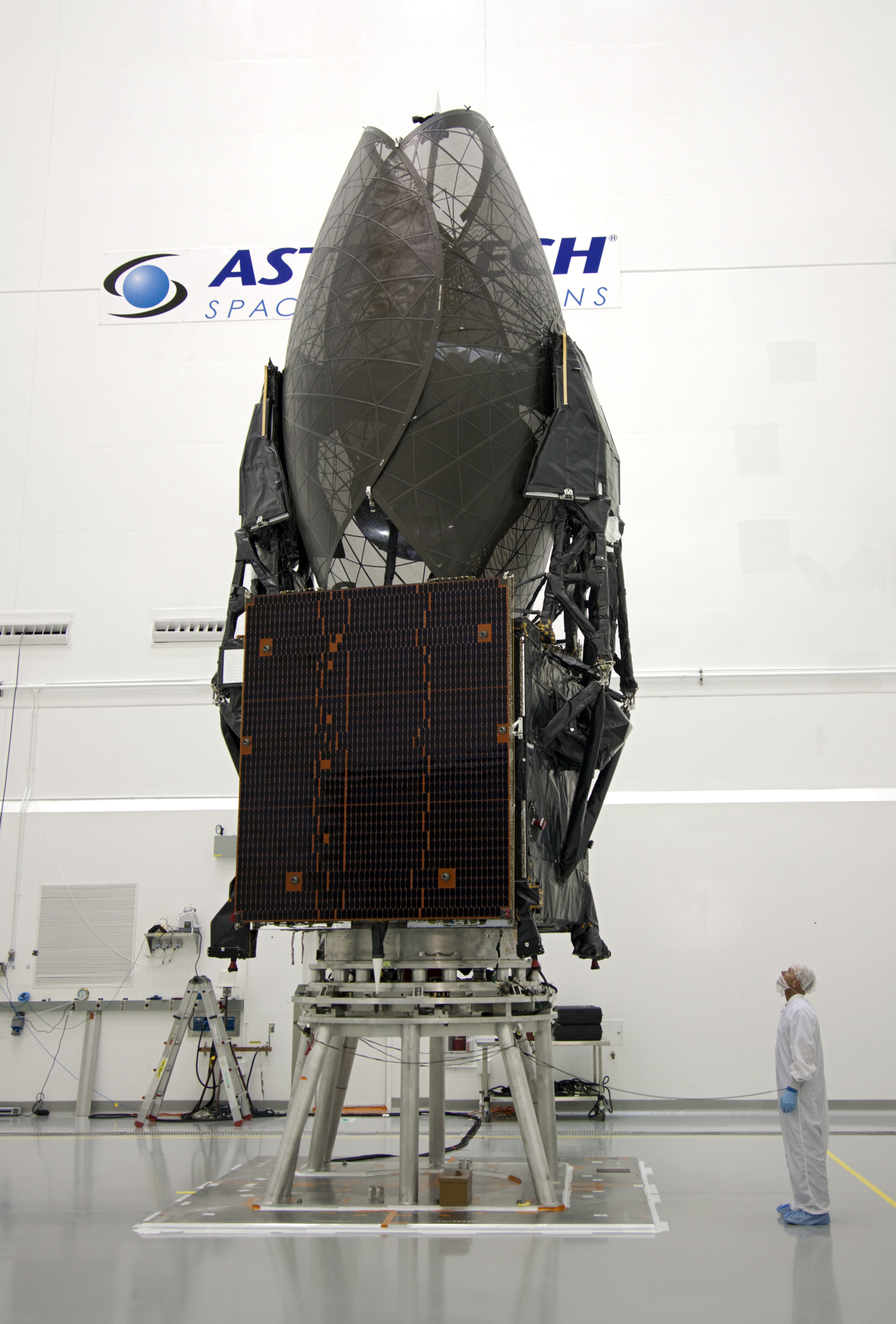
- TDRS-K before launch
- Mission type: Communications
- Operator: NASA
- COSPAR ID: 2013-004A
- SATCAT no.: 39070
- Mission duration: Planned: 15 years Elapsed: 12 years, 8 months, 20 days

Spacecraft properties
- Bus: BSS-601HP
- Manufacturer: Boeing
- Launch mass: 3,454 kilograms (7,615 lb)

Start of mission
- Launch date: 31 January 2013, 01:48 UTC
- Rocket: Atlas V 401 AV-036
- Launch site: Cape Canaveral SLC-41
- Contractor: United Launch Alliance

Orbital parameters
- Reference system: Geocentric
- Regime: Geosynchronous orbit
- Perigee altitude: 35,755 kilometers (22,217 mi)
- Apogee altitude: 35,826 kilometers (22,261 mi)
- Inclination: 6.39 degrees
- Period: 1436.00 minutes
- Epoch: 20 January 2015, 13:09:06 UTC
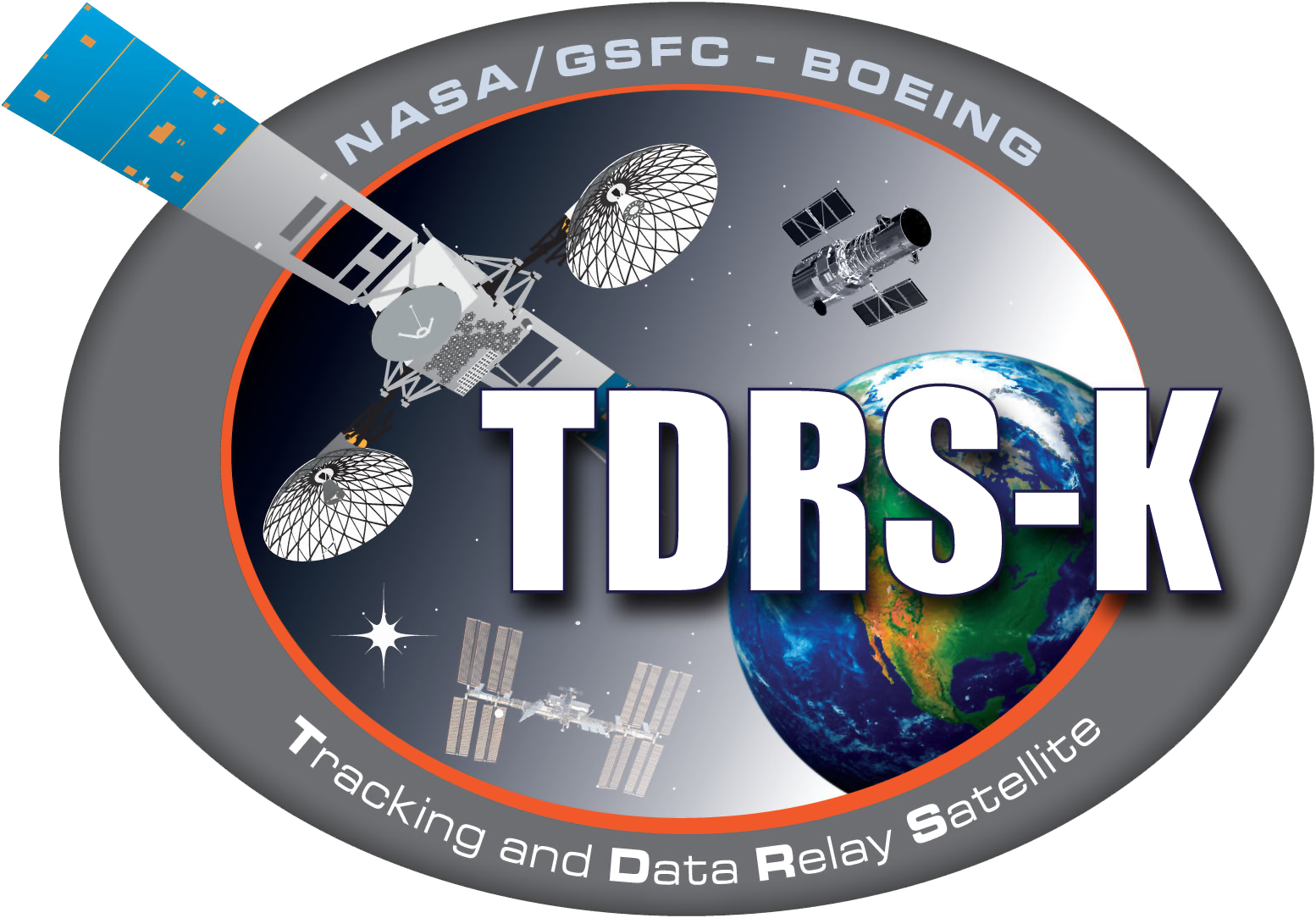
- Tracking and Data Relay Satellite; Third-generation

TDRS-11, known before launch as TDRS-K, is an American communications satellite which is operated by NASA as part of the Tracking and Data Relay Satellite System. The eleventh Tracking and Data Relay Satellite is the first third-generation spacecraft.

TDRS-11 was constructed by Boeing, and is based on the BSS-601HP satellite bus. Fully fuelled, it has a mass of 3,454 kilograms (7,615 lb), and is expected to operate for 15 years. It carries two steerable antennas capable of providing S, Ku and Ka band communications for other spacecraft, plus an array of additional S-band transponders to allow communications at a lower data rate with greater numbers of spacecraft.

TDRS-11 was launched at 01:48 UTC on 31 January 2013, at the beginning of a 40-minute launch window. United Launch Alliance performed the launch using an Atlas V carrier rocket, tail number AV-036, flying in the 401 configuration. Liftoff occurred from Space Launch Complex 41 at the Cape Canaveral Air Force Station, and the rocket placed its payload into a geostationary transfer orbit.

Following its arrival in geosynchronous orbit, the satellite underwent on-orbit testing. It was handed over to NASA in August 2013, receiving its operational designation TDRS-11. After its arrival on-station at 171 degrees west the satellite began its final phase of testing prior to entry into service at the end of November. As of May 2020, it was positioned at 174 degrees west.

Location of TDRS as of 22 May 2020

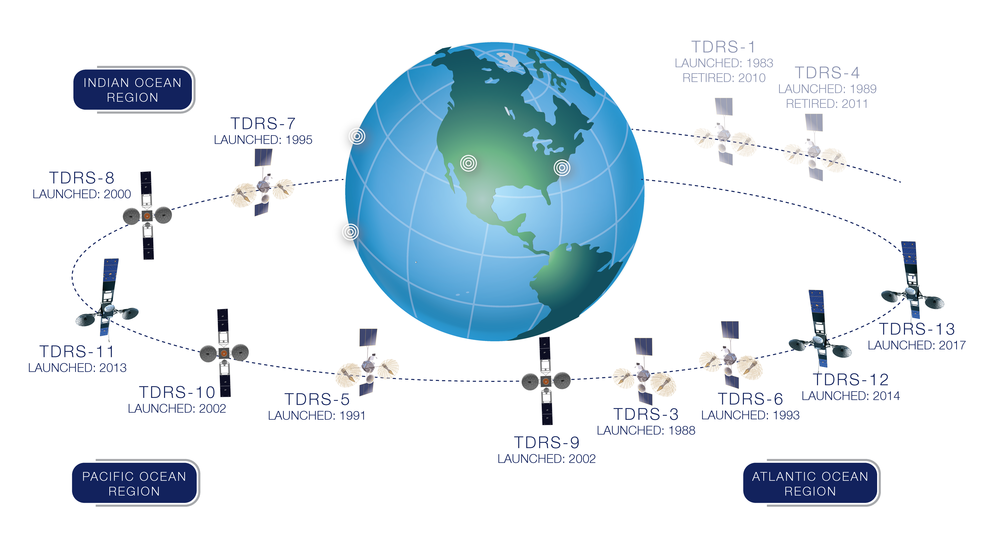
Location of TDRS as of March 2019

== See also ==
- List of TDRS satellites
