= TDRS-10 =

American communications satellite

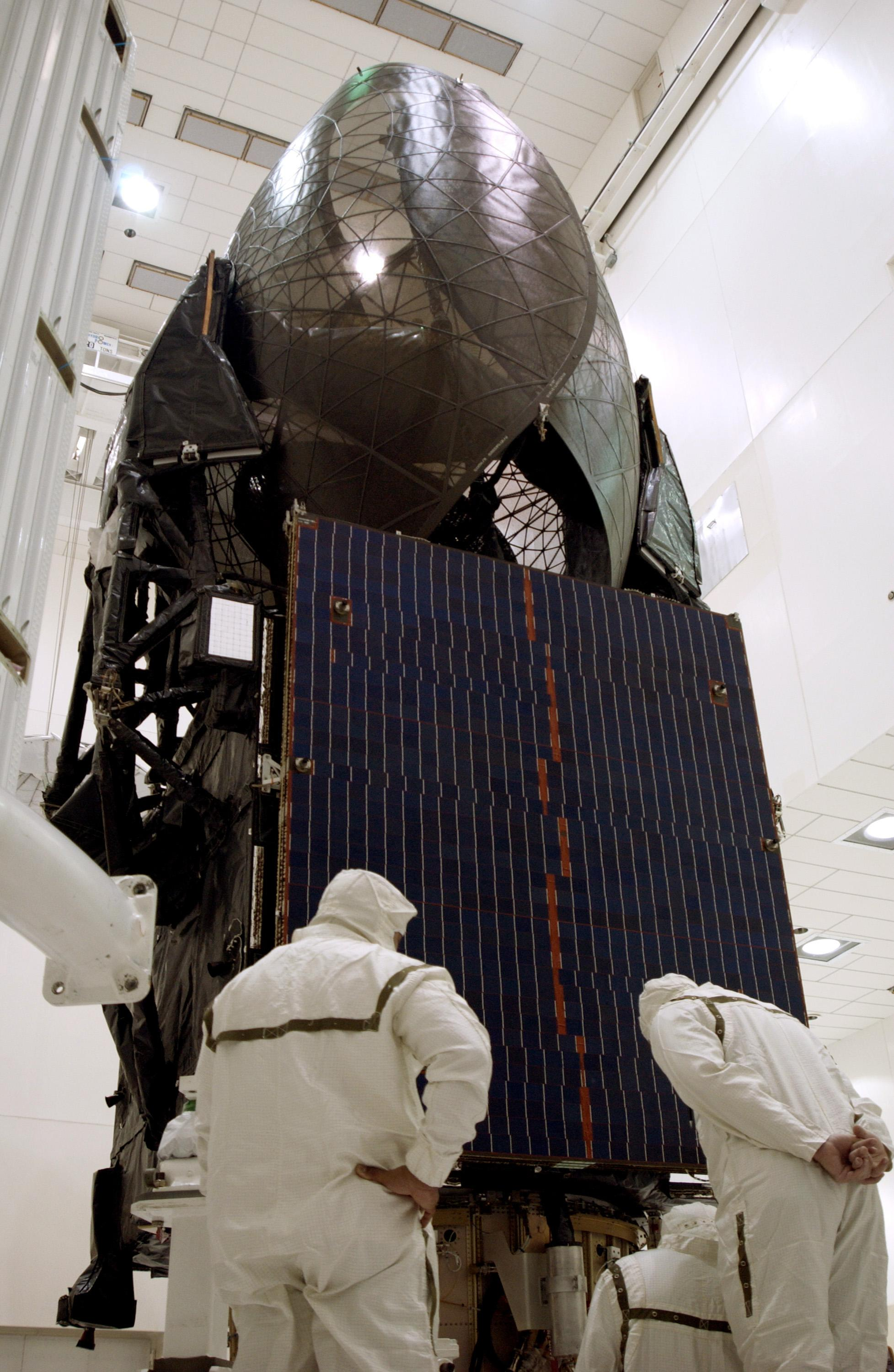
- TDRS-J undergoing processing before launch
- Mission type: Communication
- Operator: NASA
- COSPAR ID: 2002-055A
- SATCAT no.: 27566
- Mission duration: Planned: 20 years Elapsed: 22 years, 8 months, 7 days

Spacecraft properties
- Bus: BSS-601
- Manufacturer: Boeing SDC
- Launch mass: 3,180 kg (7,010 lb)

Start of mission
- Launch date: 5 December 2002, 02:42 UTC
- Rocket: Atlas IIA
- Launch site: Cape Canaveral SLC-36A
- Contractor: ILS

Orbital parameters
- Reference system: Geocentric
- Regime: Geostationary
- Longitude: 153° West; 151° West; ~42-40° West (2004—)
- Perigee altitude: 35,766 kilometers (22,224 mi)
- Apogee altitude: 35,798 kilometers (22,244 mi)
- Inclination: 6.09 degrees
- Period: 1435.86 minutes
- Epoch: 1 January 2004
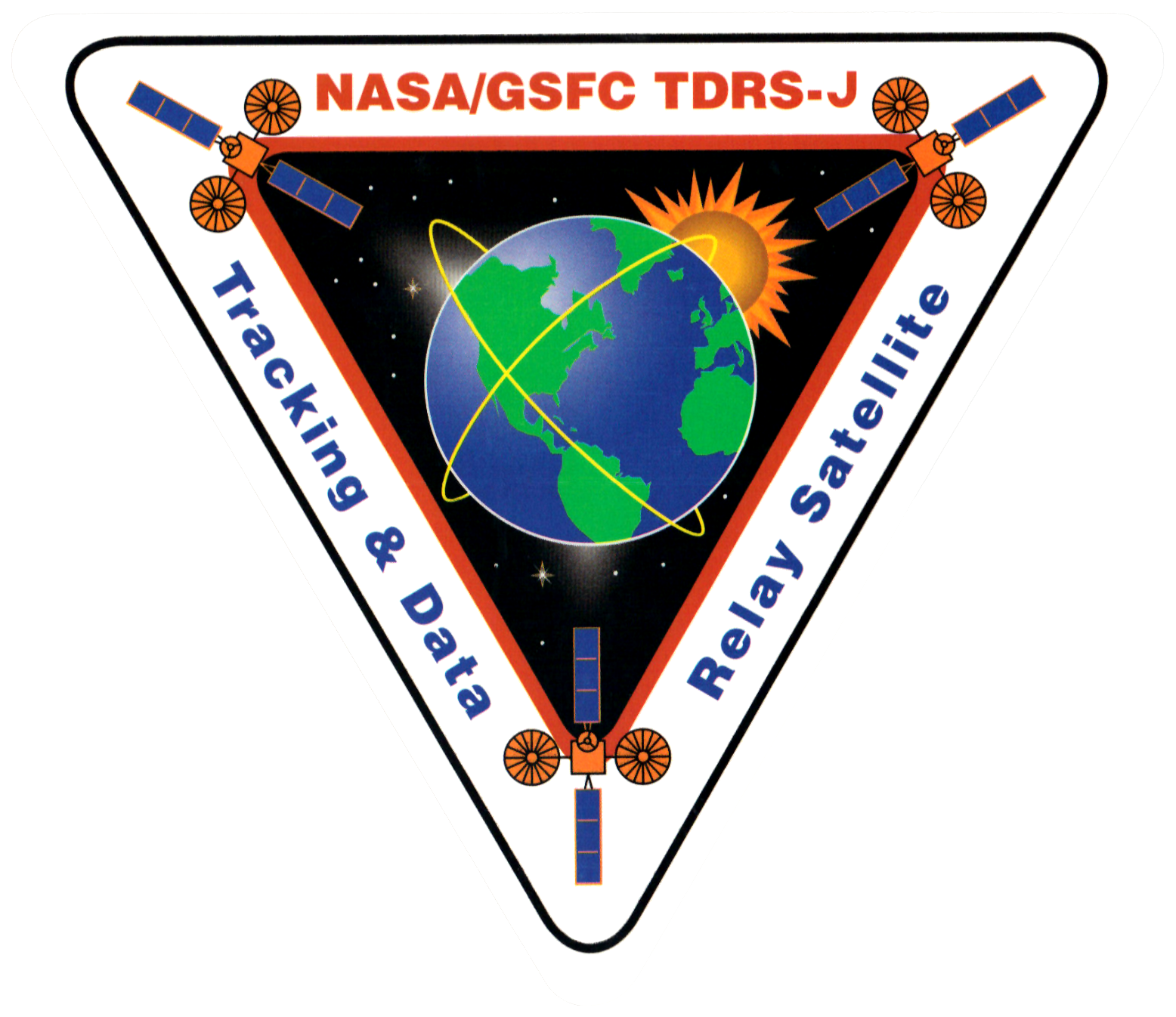
- Tracking and Data Relay Satellite; Second-generation

TDRS-10, known before launch as TDRS-J, is an American communications satellite which is operated by NASA as part of the Tracking and Data Relay Satellite System. It was constructed by the Boeing Satellite Development Center, formerly Hughes Space and Communications, and is based on the BSS-601 satellite bus. It was the third and final Advanced TDRS, or second-generation Tracking and Data Relay Satellite, to be launched.

== History ==
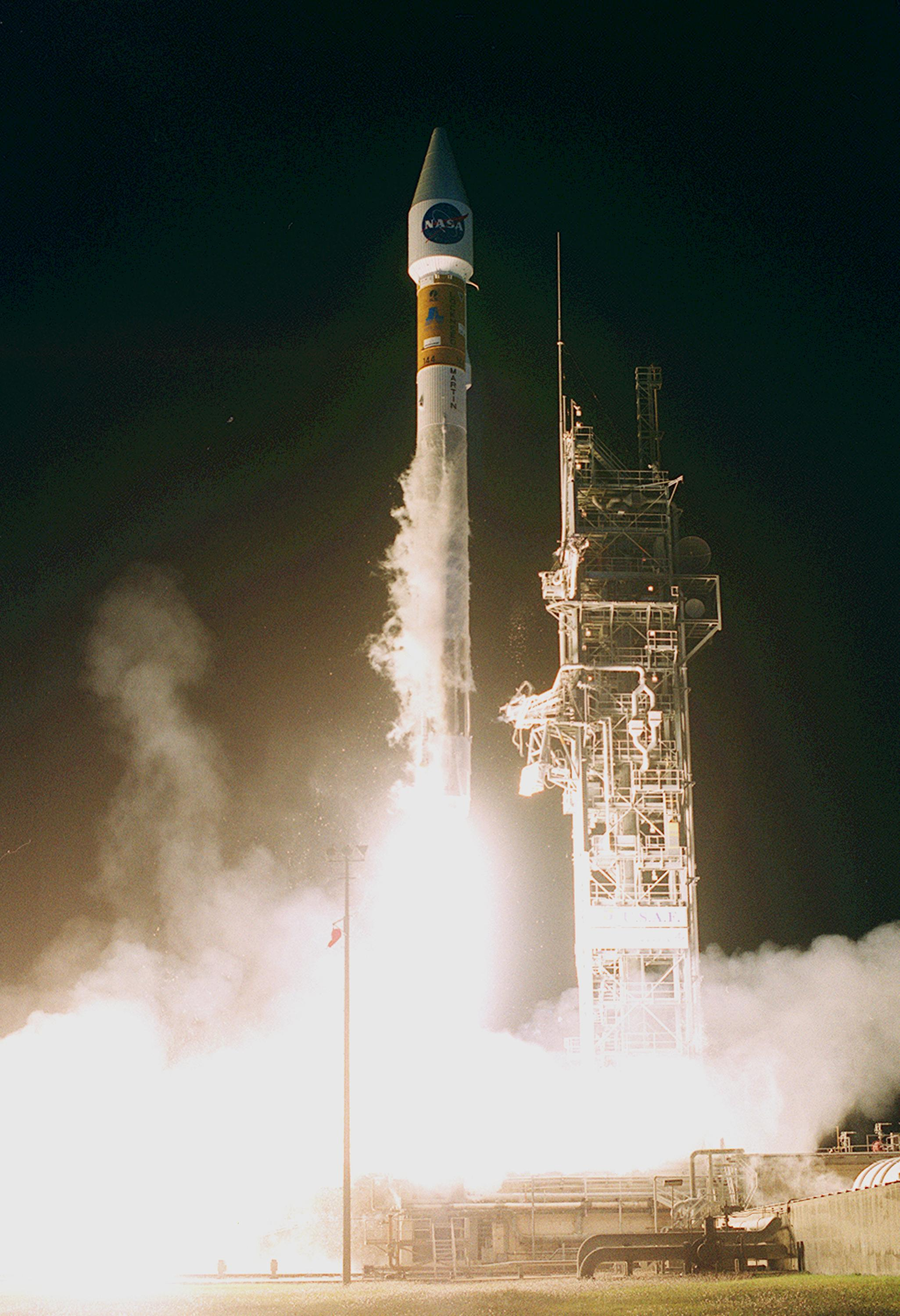
The launch of TDRS-J

The final Atlas IIA rocket was used to launch TDRS-J, under a contract with International Launch Services. The launch occurred at 02:42 UTC on 5 December 2002, from Space Launch Complex 36A at the Cape Canaveral Air Force Station. TDRS-10 separated from its carrier rocket into a geosynchronous transfer orbit. At 01:00 UTC on 14 December, following a series of apogee burns, it reached geostationary orbit.

=== Deployment ===
TDRS-J was initially positioned in geostationary orbit at a longitude 153 degrees west of the Greenwich Meridian, and following on-orbit testing, it received the operational designation TDRS-10. In December 2003, it was moved to 151.5° west, arriving the next month. It remained there until June, when it departed for 42.3° west. It arrived there in November, and has since been slowly drifting eastwards. By November 2005, it was at 42° west, and in November 2006, it was recorded to have been at 41.6° west. In July 2009, it was at 40.75° west. In May 2020, it was at 171 degrees west.

Location of TDRS as of 22 May 2020

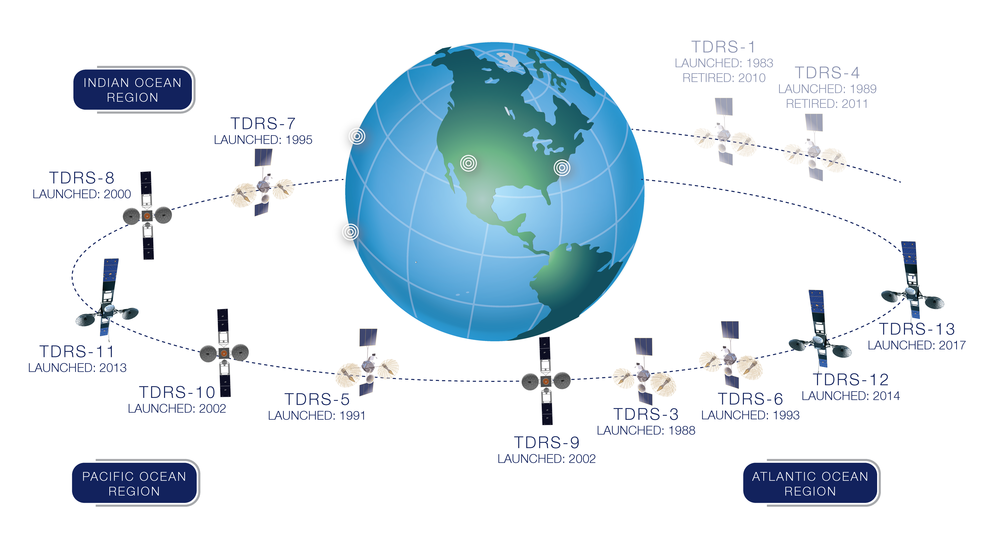
Location of TDRS as of March 2019

== See also ==
- List of TDRS satellites
