= TDRS-9 =

American communications satellite

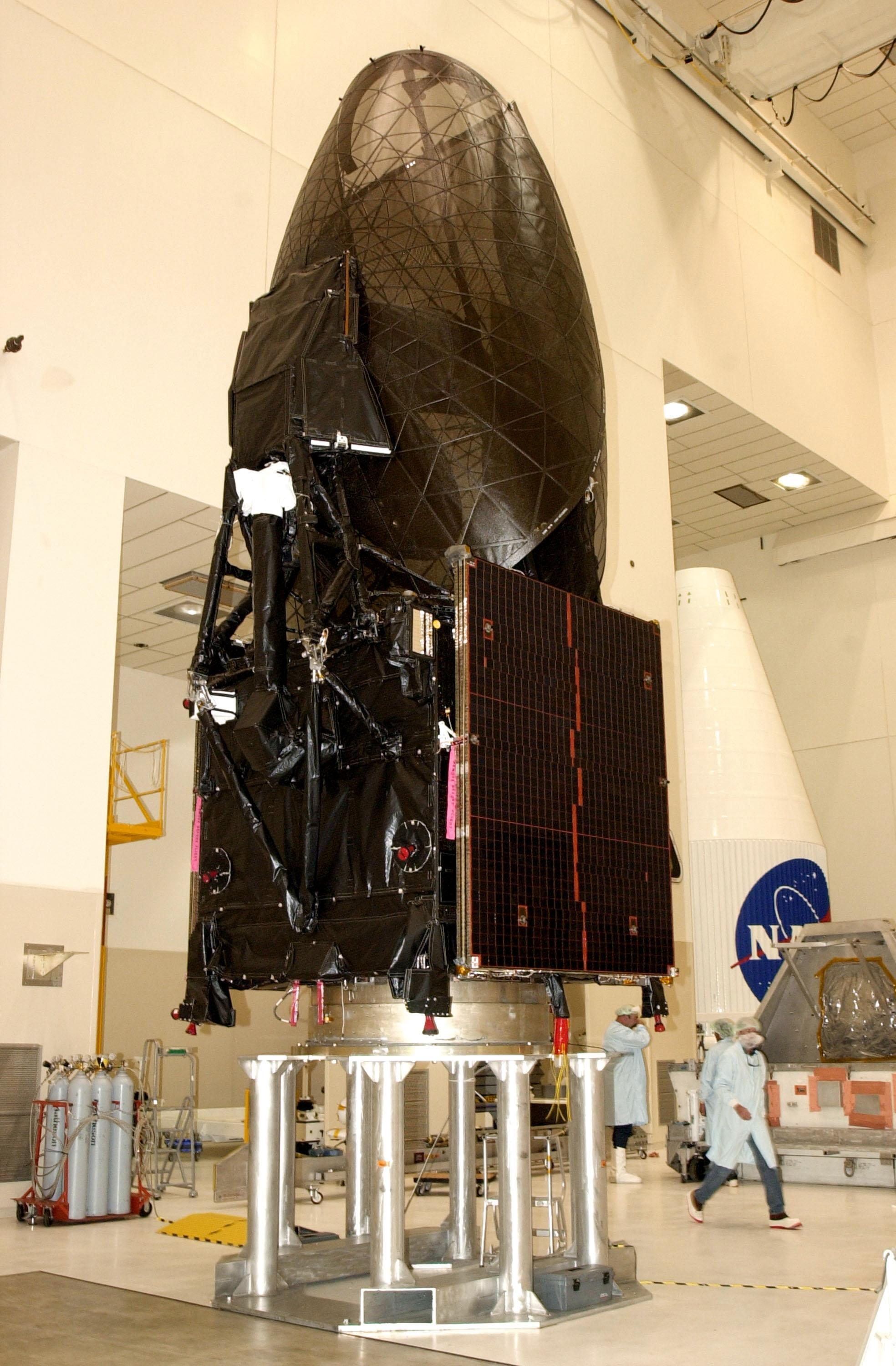
- TDRS-I undergoing processing before launch
- Mission type: Communication
- Operator: NASA
- COSPAR ID: 2002-011A
- SATCAT no.: 27389
- Mission duration: Planned: 15 years Final: 20 years, 9 months and 27 days

Spacecraft properties
- Bus: BSS-601
- Manufacturer: Boeing SDC
- Launch mass: 3,180 kilograms (7,010 lb)

Start of mission
- Launch date: 8 March 2002, 22:59 UTC
- Rocket: Atlas IIA
- Launch site: Cape Canaveral SLC-36A
- Contractor: ILS

End of mission
- Disposal: Decommissioned
- Deactivated: 5 January 2023

Orbital parameters
- Reference system: Geocentric
- Regime: Geostationary
- Longitude: 151° West; 173.5° West; 64.5° West
- Perigee altitude: 35,768 kilometers (22,225 mi)
- Apogee altitude: 35,809 kilometers (22,251 mi)
- Inclination: 0 degrees
- Epoch: 8 March 2002, 17:59:00 UTC
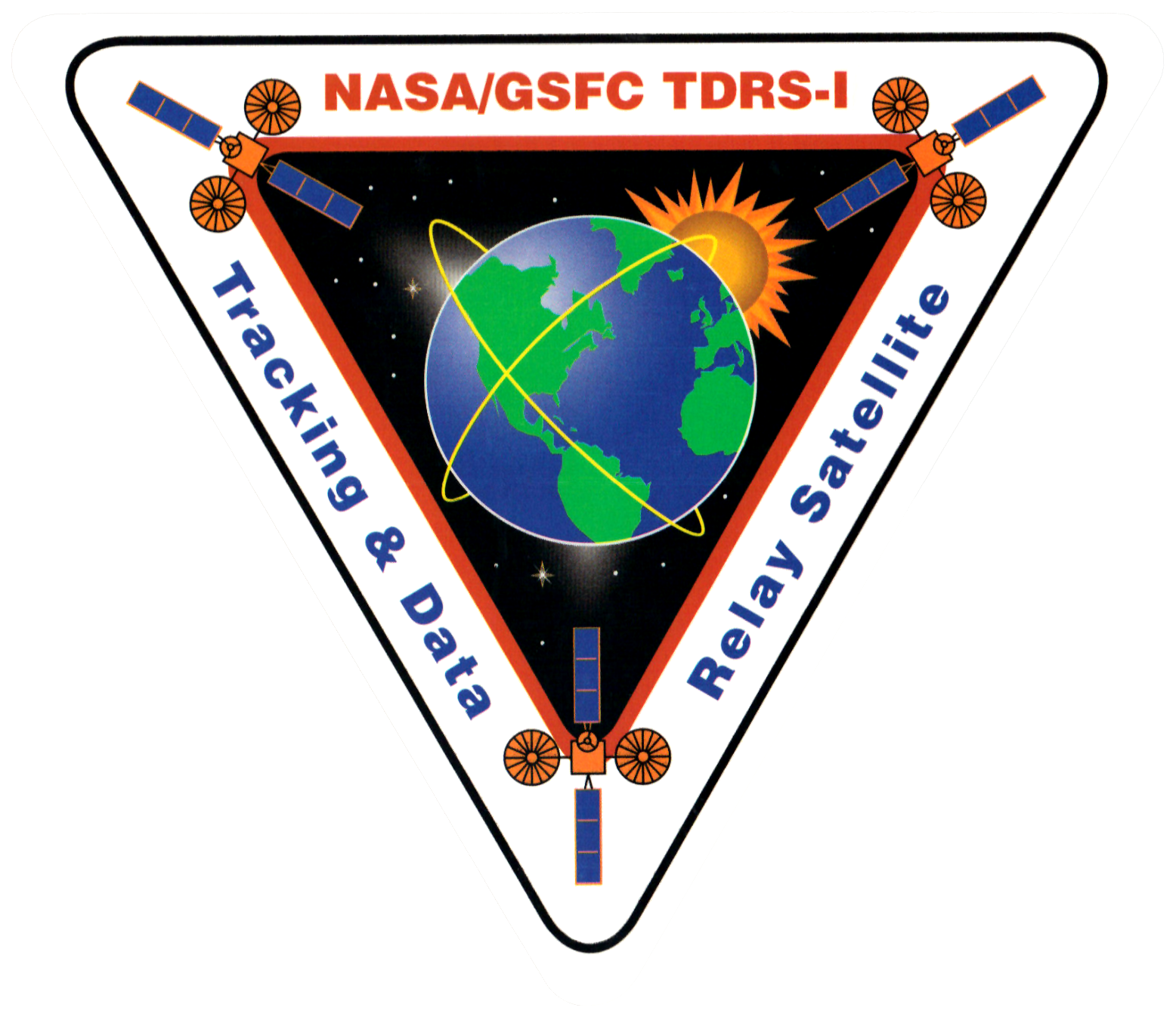
- Tracking and Data Relay Satellite; Second-generation

TDRS-9, known before launch as TDRS-I, was an American communications satellite which was operated by NASA as part of the Tracking and Data Relay Satellite System. It was constructed by the Boeing Satellite Development Center, formerly Hughes Space and Communications, and was based on the BSS-601 satellite bus. It was the second Advanced TDRS, or second-generation Tracking and Data Relay Satellite, to be launched.

== History ==
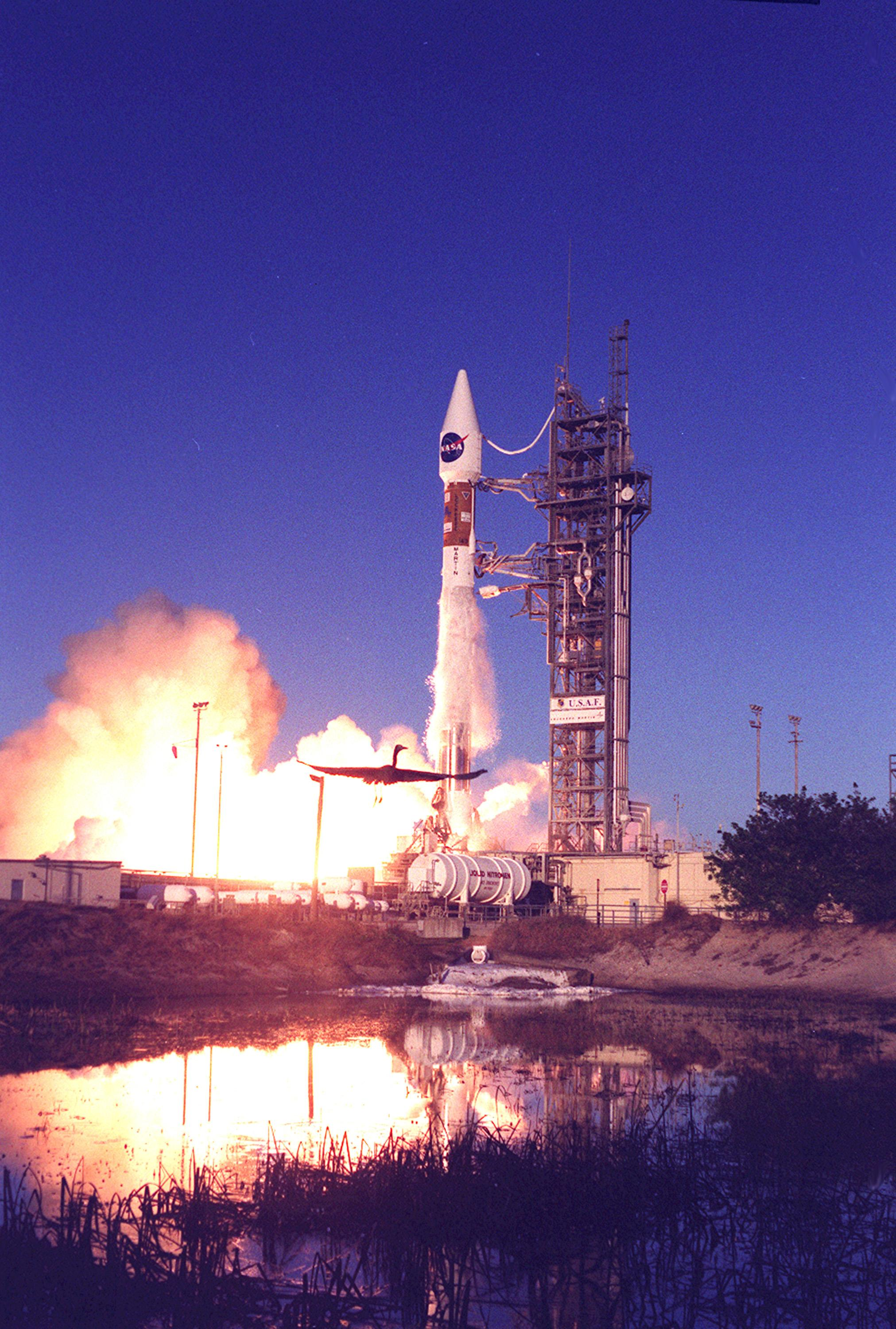
The launch of TDRS-I

An Atlas IIA rocket was used to launch TDRS-I, under a contract with International Launch Services. The launch occurred at 22:59 GMT on 8 March 2002, and used Space Launch Complex 36A at the Cape Canaveral Air Force Station.

=== Deployment and problems ===
TDRS-9 separated from its carrier rocket into a geosynchronous transfer orbit. At 06:00 on 6 October, following a series of apogee burns, it reached geostationary orbit. The orbit raising maneuvers were originally scheduled to take ten days, but ended up lasting six months due to a problem with the system used to pressurize its number two fuel tank. A valve used to release helium into the tank failed to open. This was later established to have been due to a wiring error prior to launch. Engineers developed a solution which involved pressurizing the tank using the pressurization system from the number one tank, which was still working, once the propellant in that tank had been used. When orbit raising operations resumed on 19 March, it was estimated that it would take two months to raise the satellite's orbit. It was later discovered that only using fuel from the number one tank upset the satellite's center of mass, causing the satellite to tumble when its main engines were fired. Controllers were able to compensate for this, however it took longer to raise the orbit as a result.

=== Operations ===
Upon reaching geostationary orbit, TDRS-I was initially placed at a longitude 151 degrees west of the Greenwich Meridian, and following on-orbit testing it received its operational designation, TDRS-9. In October 2003 it was moved from 151° West, and it arrived at 173.5° West in January 2004. It remained there until September, when it was moved to 64.5° West, arriving in March 2005. Engineers believed that the problems with its fuel tank pressurization system would not affect its operational lifespan.

Location of TDRS as of 22 May 2020

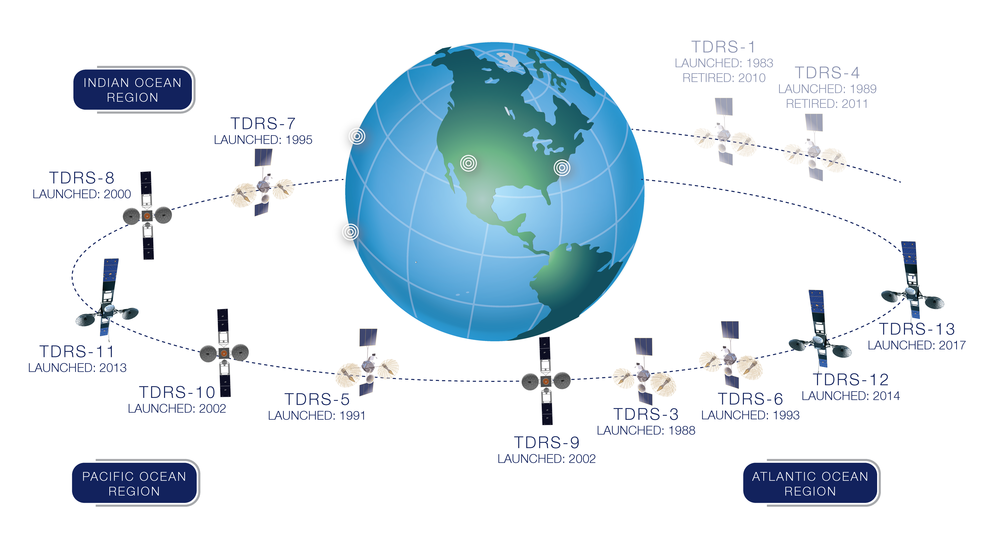
Location of TDRS as of March 2019

== See also ==
- List of TDRS satellites
