= Nūhaka =

Settlement in Hawke's Bay Region, New Zealand

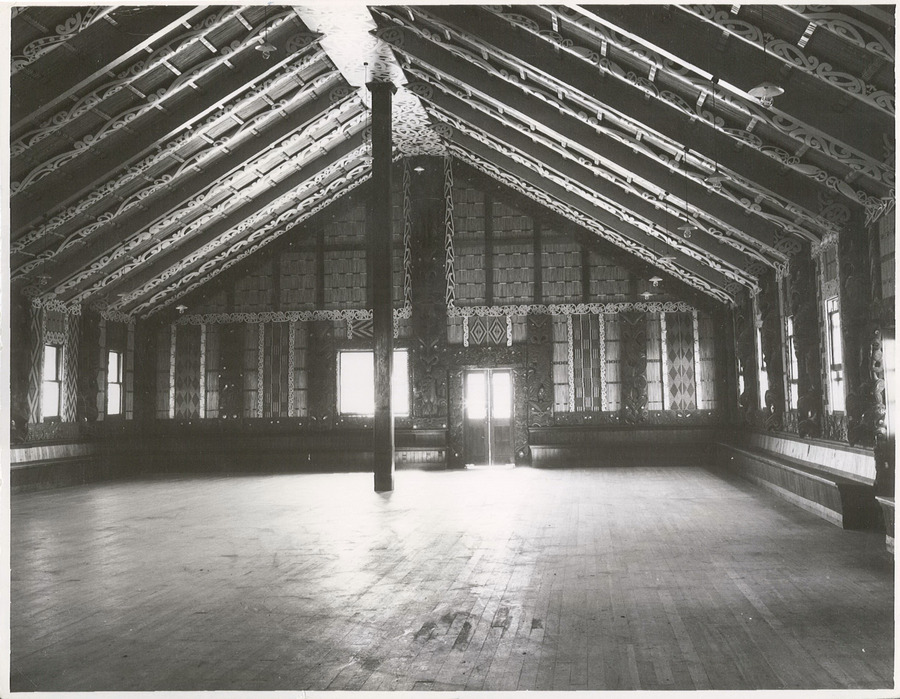
- Wharenui at Nūhaka in 1949
- Interactive map of Nūhaka
- Coordinates: 39°03′S 177°45′E
- Country: New Zealand
- Region: Hawke's Bay
- Territorial authority: Wairoa District
- Ward: Wairoa General Ward; Wairoa Māori Ward
- Electorates: Napier; Ikaroa-Rāwhiti (Māori)

Government
  - Territorial authority: Wairoa District Council
  - Mayor of Wairoa: Craig Little
  - Napier MP: Katie Nimon
  - Ikaroa-Rāwhiti MP: Cushla Tangaere-Manuel

Area
  - Total: 1.46 km^{2} (0.56 sq mi)

Population (June 2025)
  - Total: 220
  - Density: 150/km^{2} (390/sq mi)

Nūhaka is a small settlement in the northern Hawke's Bay Region of New Zealand's eastern North Island, lying on State Highway 2 between Wairoa and Gisborne. The road to Māhia Peninsula turns off the highway at Nūhaka.

Nūhaka has one general store, a fish and chip shop, a local garage and a pāua factory. It also has a substantial and well supported meetinghouse of the Church of Jesus Christ of Latter-day Saints.

== Demographics ==
Statistics New Zealand describes Nūhaka as a rural settlement, which covers 1.46 km^{2} (0.56 sq mi). It had an estimated population of 220 as of June 2025, with a population density of 151 people per km^{2}. It is part of the larger Mahia statistical area.

Historical population
Year	Pop.	±% p.a.
2006	246	—
2013	210	−2.23%
2018	198	−1.17%
2023	213	+1.47%

Nūhaka had a population of 213 in the 2023 New Zealand census, an increase of 15 people (7.6%) since the 2018 census, and an increase of 3 people (1.4%) since the 2013 census. There were 117 males and 99 females in 87 dwellings. 2.8% of people identified as LGBTIQ+. The median age was 49.0 years (compared with 38.1 years nationally). There were 42 people (19.7%) aged under 15 years, 33 (15.5%) aged 15 to 29, 84 (39.4%) aged 30 to 64, and 57 (26.8%) aged 65 or older.

People could identify as more than one ethnicity. The results were 42.3% European (Pākehā), 74.6% Māori, 5.6% Pasifika, 2.8% Asian, and 2.8% other, which includes people giving their ethnicity as "New Zealander". English was spoken by 97.2%, Māori by 25.4%, and other languages by 2.8%. No language could be spoken by 2.8% (e.g. too young to talk). New Zealand Sign Language was known by 1.4%. The percentage of people born overseas was 7.0, compared with 28.8% nationally.

Religious affiliations were 46.5% Christian, and 11.3% Māori religious beliefs. People who answered that they had no religion were 35.2%, and 7.0% of people did not answer the census question.

Of those at least 15 years old, 33 (19.3%) people had a bachelor's or higher degree, 84 (49.1%) had a post-high school certificate or diploma, and 48 (28.1%) people exclusively held high school qualifications. The median income was $29,000, compared with $41,500 nationally. 9 people (5.3%) earned over $100,000 compared to 12.1% nationally. The employment status of those at least 15 was 66 (38.6%) full-time, 18 (10.5%) part-time, and 9 (5.3%) unemployed.

== Marae ==
Nūhaka is the tribal centre of the Ngāti Rakaipaaka people, a Māori subtribe of Ngāti Kahungunu. It has several marae (meeting grounds) and wharenui (meeting houses) for Ngāti Rakaipaaka and other iwi (tribe) and hapū:

The master-carved Kahungunu Marae is a war memorial carved under the tutelage of Pine Taiapa. It features in the 1950s film Broken Barrier directed by John O'Shea. Since 2005, it has hosted events as part of the Wairoa Māori Film Festival. It includes Te Maara A Ngata wharenui, and is affiliated with Ngāti Pāhauwera and Ngāti Pāhauwera hapū, and Ngāti Pāhauwera iwi.

Māhanga or Rongomaiwahine marae and Te Poho o Rongomaiwahine wharenui is a marae, also affiliated with Ngāi Tū hapū.

Other marae include Tamakahu Marae, Tāne-nui-a-Rangi Marae, Te Kotahitanga and Nūhaka Unity Hall, Te Manutai Marae, and Te Poho o Te Rehu or Te Rehu Marae.

In October 2020, the Government committed $1,949,075 from the Provincial Growth Fund to upgrade Te Manutai Marae, Te Poho o Te Rehu Marae, and 22 other marae. It also committed $288,609 to upgrade Kahungunu Marae.

== Education ==
Nuhaka School is a Year 1–8 co-educational state primary school. It is a decile 2 school with a roll of 97 as of July 2026. Nuhaka Public School merged with Nuhaka Māori School (originally Nuhaka Native School) on the latter schools site in 1962. The centenary of the Native School was celebrated in 2018 although the school opened in 1894.
