= Wairoa (disambiguation) =

Wairoa is a town in Hawke's Bay, New Zealand.

Wairoa or Te Wairoa may also refer to:

New Zealand

- Clevedon, New Zealand, historically known as Wairoa South
- Te Wairoa (iwi), a Māori tribal group
- Te Wairoa, New Zealand, a village buried by the eruption of Mount Tarawera in 1886 and abandoned
- Wairoa District in Hawke's Bay
- Wairoa River (disambiguation)

Australia

- Wairoa, Aldgate, a historic house in the Adelaide Hills

== See also ==
- Wairau (disambiguation)
- Wairua (disambiguation)
