= Kotemaori =

Kotemaori Te Moari
- Interactive map of Kotemaori
- Coordinates: 39°03′45″S 177°02′25″E
- Country: New Zealand
- Region: Hawke's Bay Region
- Territorial authority: Wairoa District
- Ward: Wairoa General Ward; Wairoa Māori Ward
- Electorates: Napier; Ikaroa-Rāwhiti (Māori)

Government
  - Territorial authority: Wairoa District Council
  - Mayor of Wairoa: Craig Little
  - Napier MP: Katie Nimon
  - Ikaroa-Rāwhiti MP: Cushla Tangaere-Manuel

Area
  - Total: 265.80 km^{2} (102.63 sq mi)

Population (2023 Census)
  - Total: 135
  - Density: 0.508/km^{2} (1.32/sq mi)

Kotemaori is a village and rural community located in the Wairoa District of the Hawke's Bay Region, in New Zealand's North Island. It is located between Raupunga and Putorino, to the west of Wairoa (to which it is connected by State Highway 2). The settlement itself lies immediately to the south of the highway.

The area includes steep forestry land where dogs have been regularly rescued. The settlement is surrounded on three sides by small streams which eventually flow into the Mohaka River 3.5 kilometres (2.2 mi) to the northeast of Kotemaori.

A rail line, part of the Palmerston North–Gisborne Line, lies close to the settlement, which was formerly served by Kotemaori railway station. The part of the line between Napier and Gisborne was effectively mothballed in 2012. In June 2019 the line reopened for freight-only traffic, specifically the transportation of logs from forestry sites around Wairoa to the port at Napier. The line has been closed since 14 February 2023 due to damage from Cyclone Gabrielle.

== Etymology ==
The local landowner, George Bee, built a new homestead about 1921. An old coat belonging to a Māori person was found at the new site, so Bee called the homestead Kotemaori, which means 'Māori coat'. The original name for the area was 'Te Moari', which means the swing or slide.

== Demographics ==
Kotemaori and its surrounds cover 265.80 km^{2} (102.63 sq mi). It is part of the Maungataniwha-Raupunga statistical area.

Historical population
Year	Pop.	±% p.a.
2006	120	—
2013	117	−0.36%
2018	129	+1.97%
2023	135	+0.91%

Kotemaori had a population of 135 in the 2023 New Zealand census, an increase of 6 people (4.7%) since the 2018 census, and an increase of 18 people (15.4%) since the 2013 census. There were 84 males and 51 females in 45 dwellings. 2.2% of people identified as LGBTIQ+. The median age was 33.2 years (compared with 38.1 years nationally). There were 24 people (17.8%) aged under 15 years, 33 (24.4%) aged 15 to 29, 66 (48.9%) aged 30 to 64, and 12 (8.9%) aged 65 or older.

People could identify as more than one ethnicity. The results were 53.3% European (Pākehā), 22.2% Māori, 31.1% Pasifika, and 8.9% other, which includes people giving their ethnicity as "New Zealander". English was spoken by 91.1%, Māori by 8.9%, and other languages by 15.6%. The percentage of people born overseas was 28.9, compared with 28.8% nationally.

Religious affiliations were 44.4% Christian, and 2.2% Māori religious beliefs. People who answered that they had no religion were 46.7%, and 6.7% of people did not answer the census question.

Of those at least 15 years old, 6 (5.4%) people had a bachelor's or higher degree, 87 (78.4%) had a post-high school certificate or diploma, and 21 (18.9%) people exclusively held high school qualifications. The median income was $35,900, compared with $41,500 nationally. 6 people (5.4%) earned over $100,000 compared to 12.1% nationally. The employment status of those at least 15 was 66 (59.5%) full-time, 12 (10.8%) part-time, and 9 (8.1%) unemployed.

== Education ==
Kotemaori School is a Year 1–8 co-educational state primary school. It is a decile 4 school with a roll of 16 as of July 2026. It opened in 1926. The school suffered from water damage during Cyclone Gabrielle in 2023, and asbestos was found in the buildings subsequently. Students spent more than a year at Putorino School while new classrooms were built.
