= Mōhaka =

Settlement in northern Hawke's Bay, New Zealand

- Interactive map of Mōhaka
- Coordinates: 39°07′S 177°11′E
- Region: Hawke's Bay Region
- Territorial authority: Wairoa District
- Ward: Wairoa General Ward; Wairoa Māori Ward
- Electorates: Napier; Ikaroa-Rāwhiti (Māori)

Government
  - Territorial authority: Wairoa District Council
  - Mayor of Wairoa: Craig Little
  - Napier MP: Katie Nimon
  - Ikaroa-Rāwhiti MP: Cushla Tangaere-Manuel

Area
  - Total: 56.86 km^{2} (21.95 sq mi)

Population (2023 Census)
  - Total: 117
  - Density: 2.06/km^{2} (5.33/sq mi)

Mōhaka is a small settlement in the northern Hawke's Bay region of the eastern North Island of New Zealand. It is located on the coast of Hawke Bay, 20 kilometres southwest of Wairoa.

The Mohaka River reaches the coast close to Mōhaka.

== Demographics ==
Mōhaka and its surrounds cover 56.86 km^{2} (21.95 sq mi). It is part of the Maungataniwha-Raupunga statistical area.

Historical population for Mohaka and its surrounds
| Year | Pop. | ±% p.a. |
|---|---|---|
| 2006 | 126 | — |
| 2013 | 105 | −2.57% |
| 2018 | 96 | −1.78% |
| 2023 | 117 | +4.04% |

Mōhaka had a population of 117 in the 2023 New Zealand census, an increase of 21 people (21.9%) since the 2018 census, and an increase of 12 people (11.4%) since the 2013 census. There were 60 males and 57 females in 39 dwellings. The median age was 40.8 years (compared with 38.1 years nationally). There were 36 people (30.8%) aged under 15 years, 12 (10.3%) aged 15 to 29, 51 (43.6%) aged 30 to 64, and 15 (12.8%) aged 65 or older.

People could identify as more than one ethnicity. The results were 30.8% European (Pākehā), 79.5% Māori, 2.6% Pasifika, and 5.1% other, which includes people giving their ethnicity as "New Zealander". English was spoken by 100.0%, Māori by 17.9%, and other languages by 2.6%. The percentage of people born overseas was 2.6, compared with 28.8% nationally.

Religious affiliations were 38.5% Christian, 23.1% Māori religious beliefs, and 2.6% New Age. People who answered that they had no religion were 30.8%, and 5.1% of people did not answer the census question.

Of those at least 15 years old, 6 (7.4%) people had a bachelor's or higher degree, 48 (59.3%) had a post-high school certificate or diploma, and 21 (25.9%) people exclusively held high school qualifications. The median income was $33,800, compared with $41,500 nationally. 3 people (3.7%) earned over $100,000 compared to 12.1% nationally. The employment status of those at least 15 was 39 (48.1%) full-time, 6 (7.4%) part-time, and 3 (3.7%) unemployed.

== Marae ==
Mōhaka has two tribal meeting grounds for the iwi of Ngāti Pāhauwera, and the Ngāti Kahungunu hapū of Kurahikakawa: Waiapapa-a-Iwi Mohaka Marae and Te Kahu O Te Rangi meeting house, and Waihua or Kurahikakawa Marae.

In October 2020, the Government committed $1,949,075 from the Provincial Growth Fund to upgrade the two marae and 22 other Ngāti Kahungunu marae, creating 164 jobs.

== Education ==
Mohaka School is a Year 1-8 co-educational state primary school. It is a decile 1 school with a roll of 39 as of July 2026. It opened in 1880.

== Climate ==
Climate data for Mohaka Forest (1981–2010)
| Month | Jan | Feb | Mar | Apr | May | Jun | Jul | Aug | Sep | Oct | Nov | Dec | Year |
|---|---|---|---|---|---|---|---|---|---|---|---|---|---|
| Mean daily maximum °C (°F) | 23.3 (73.9) | 22.8 (73.0) | 21.0 (69.8) | 18.1 (64.6) | 15.5 (59.9) | 13.1 (55.6) | 12.2 (54.0) | 12.9 (55.2) | 15.2 (59.4) | 17.4 (63.3) | 19.7 (67.5) | 21.4 (70.5) | 17.7 (63.9) |
| Daily mean °C (°F) | 17.9 (64.2) | 17.6 (63.7) | 16.0 (60.8) | 13.4 (56.1) | 11.2 (52.2) | 8.9 (48.0) | 8.2 (46.8) | 8.7 (47.7) | 10.6 (51.1) | 12.5 (54.5) | 14.5 (58.1) | 16.4 (61.5) | 13.0 (55.4) |
| Mean daily minimum °C (°F) | 12.5 (54.5) | 12.4 (54.3) | 11.1 (52.0) | 8.6 (47.5) | 6.8 (44.2) | 4.6 (40.3) | 4.1 (39.4) | 4.4 (39.9) | 6.0 (42.8) | 7.6 (45.7) | 9.3 (48.7) | 11.5 (52.7) | 8.2 (46.8) |
| Average rainfall mm (inches) | 71.2 (2.80) | 71.2 (2.80) | 194.0 (7.64) | 100.2 (3.94) | 132.9 (5.23) | 122.5 (4.82) | 147.6 (5.81) | 126.4 (4.98) | 156.5 (6.16) | 102.8 (4.05) | 68.4 (2.69) | 71.4 (2.81) | 1,365.1 (53.73) |
Source: NIWA
