= Putere =

Village and rural community on New Zealand's North Island

Putere Te Moari
- Interactive map of Putere
- Coordinates: 38.945°S 177.029°E
- Country: New Zealand
- Region: Hawke's Bay Region
- Territorial authority: Wairoa District
- Ward: Wairoa General Ward; Wairoa Māori Ward
- Electorates: Napier; Ikaroa-Rāwhiti (Māori)

Government
  - Territorial authority: Wairoa District Council
  - Mayor of Wairoa: Craig Little
  - Napier MP: Katie Nimon
  - Ikaroa-Rāwhiti MP: Cushla Tangaere-Manuel

Area
  - Total: 1,238.21 km^{2} (478.08 sq mi)

Population (2023 Census)
  - Total: 126
  - Density: 0.102/km^{2} (0.264/sq mi)

Putere is a village and rural community in the Wairoa District of the Hawke's Bay Region, on New Zealand's North Island. It is located around the small Lake Rotoroa and Lake Rotonuiaha. The main road to Putere runs from Raupunga on State Highway 2.

A European sheep farming station, Te Putere Grazing Run, was established in the area in 1875 or 1876. The area was also farmed by the families of World War I soldiers, but conditions were severe and many families had abandoned their farms by the Great Depression.

== Demographics ==
Putere and its surrounds cover 1,238.21 km^{2} (478.08 sq mi). It is part of the Maungataniwha-Raupunga statistical area.

Historical population for Putere and its surrounds
Year	Pop.	±% p.a.
2006	198	—
2013	174	−1.83%
2018	159	−1.79%
2023	126	−4.55%

Putere had a population of 126 in the 2023 New Zealand census, a decrease of 33 people (−20.8%) since the 2018 census, and a decrease of 48 people (−27.6%) since the 2013 census. There were 75 males and 48 females in 63 dwellings. The median age was 38.5 years (compared with 38.1 years nationally). There were 24 people (19.0%) aged under 15 years, 27 (21.4%) aged 15 to 29, 57 (45.2%) aged 30 to 64, and 18 (14.3%) aged 65 or older.

People could identify as more than one ethnicity. The results were 81.0% European (Pākehā), 38.1% Māori, and 4.8% other, which includes people giving their ethnicity as "New Zealander". English was spoken by 97.6%, Māori by 9.5%, and other languages by 2.4%. No language could be spoken by 2.4% (e.g. too young to talk). The percentage of people born overseas was 4.8, compared with 28.8% nationally.

Religious affiliations were 33.3% Christian, and 7.1% Māori religious beliefs. People who answered that they had no religion were 50.0%, and 7.1% of people did not answer the census question.

Of those at least 15 years old, 12 (11.8%) people had a bachelor's or higher degree, 66 (64.7%) had a post-high school certificate or diploma, and 30 (29.4%) people exclusively held high school qualifications. The median income was $29,000, compared with $41,500 nationally. 6 people (5.9%) earned over $100,000 compared to 12.1% nationally. The employment status of those at least 15 was 48 (47.1%) full-time, 15 (14.7%) part-time, and 6 (5.9%) unemployed.

== Marae ==
Te Maara a Ngata marae and meeting house is a meeting place of the Ngāti Kahungunu hapū of Ngāti Pāhauwera.

Putere marae and meeting house is a meeting place of Tūhoe and the Ngāti Ruapani hapū of Ngāti Hinekura, Pukehore and Tuwai. It is also associated with the Ngāti Kahungunu hapū of Ngāti Pāhauwera, Ruapani.

In October 2020, the Government committed $1,949,075 from the Provincial Growth Fund to upgrade Putere and 23 other Ngāti Kahungunu marae, creating 164 jobs. It also committed to $1,646,820 towards improvements of Putere and five other marae, creating 10 jobs.

== Education ==
Putere School is a Year 1–8 co-educational state primary school established in 1925. It is a decile 2 school with a roll of 4 as of July 2026. New school buildings were built remotely in 2010.
