= Tuai =

Settlement in Hawke's Bay Region, New Zealand

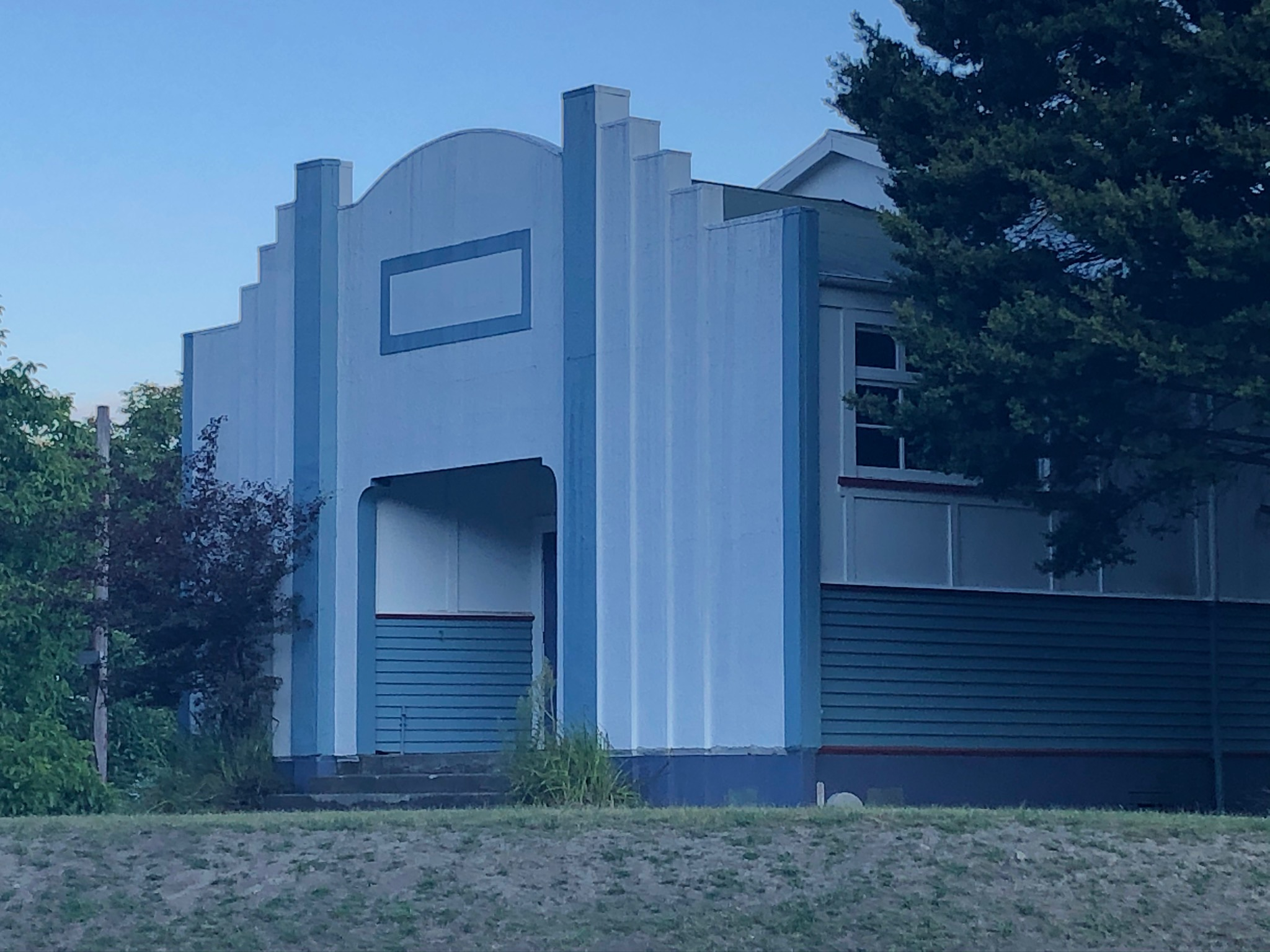
- Tuai Power Station
- Interactive map of Tuai
- Coordinates: 38.811657°S 177.147726°E
- Country: New Zealand
- Region: Hawke's Bay Region
- Territorial authority: Wairoa District
- Ward: Wairoa General Ward; Wairoa Māori Ward
- Electorates: Napier; Waiariki (Māori)

Government
  - Territorial authority: Wairoa District Council
  - Mayor of Wairoa: Craig Little
  - Napier MP: Katie Nimon
  - Waiariki MP: Rawiri Waititi

Area
  - Total: 21.99 km^{2} (8.49 sq mi)

Population (June 2025)
  - Total: 230
  - Density: 10/km^{2} (27/sq mi)

Tuai is a village and rural community located around Lake Whakamarino, in the Wairoa District of the Hawke's Bay Region, on New Zealand's North Island.

The local Tuai Power Station was opened in 1929 on the shores of Lake Whakamarino, as part of the Waikaremoana power scheme. Genesis Energy has controlled the power station remotely from Tokaanu power station since the early 2000s.

Artist Doris Lusk depicted the power station in a 1948 painting. She described the power station as a “gothic building in the middle of the wild hills”.

Lake Whakamarino, also known as Tuai Lake, is popular with anglers. It can be used by fly-fishers, and accessed with small unanchored boats.

== Demographics ==
Statistics New Zealand describes Tuai as a rural settlement, which covers 21.99 km^{2} (8.49 sq mi). It had an estimated population of 230 as of June 2025, with a population density of 10 people per km^{2}. It is part of the larger Maungataniwha-Raupunga statistical area.

Historical population
Year	Pop.	±% p.a.
2006	243	—
2013	213	−1.86%
2018	216	+0.28%
2023	222	+0.55%

Tūai had a population of 222 in the 2023 New Zealand census, an increase of 6 people (2.8%) since the 2018 census, and an increase of 9 people (4.2%) since the 2013 census. There were 108 males and 114 females in 87 dwellings. 1.4% of people identified as LGBTIQ+. The median age was 32.4 years (compared with 38.1 years nationally). There were 63 people (28.4%) aged under 15 years, 42 (18.9%) aged 15 to 29, 90 (40.5%) aged 30 to 64, and 30 (13.5%) aged 65 or older.

People could identify as more than one ethnicity. The results were 25.7% European (Pākehā), 87.8% Māori, and 1.4% Pasifika. English was spoken by 94.6%, Māori by 54.1%, and other languages by 2.7%. No language could be spoken by 2.7% (e.g. too young to talk). The percentage of people born overseas was 6.8, compared with 28.8% nationally.

Religious affiliations were 20.3% Christian, 32.4% Māori religious beliefs, 1.4% New Age, and 1.4% other religions. People who answered that they had no religion were 40.5%, and 6.8% of people did not answer the census question.

Of those at least 15 years old, 24 (15.1%) people had a bachelor's or higher degree, 99 (62.3%) had a post-high school certificate or diploma, and 45 (28.3%) people exclusively held high school qualifications. The median income was $31,200, compared with $41,500 nationally. 3 people (1.9%) earned over $100,000 compared to 12.1% nationally. The employment status of those at least 15 was 63 (39.6%) full-time, 21 (13.2%) part-time, and 12 (7.5%) unemployed.

== Marae ==
Te Kūhā Tārewa Marae and Te Poho o Hinekura or Ruapani meeting house is a meeting place of the Tūhoe hapū of Ngāti Hinekura, and the Ngāti Ruapani hapū of Ngāti Hinekura and Tuwai.

In October 2020, the Government committed $1,949,075 from the Provincial Growth Fund to upgrade the marae and 23 other Ngāti Kahungunu marae. The funding was expected to create 164 jobs.

== Education ==
Te Kura o Waikaremoana is a Year 1–8 co-educational state primary school. It is a decile 2 school with a roll of 26 as of July 2026. The school was formed by the merger of Tuai School and Kokako School in 2005. Tuai School was established by 1929 and Kokako School was established between 1896 and 1898.

== Climate ==
Climate data for Tuai (1981–2010)
Month	Jan	Feb	Mar	Apr	May	Jun	Jul	Aug	Sep	Oct	Nov	Dec	Year
Mean daily maximum °C (°F)	21.0 (69.8)	21.6 (70.9)	19.5 (67.1)	15.6 (60.1)	13.0 (55.4)	10.4 (50.7)	9.4 (48.9)	10.6 (51.1)	12.6 (54.7)	15.0 (59.0)	17.3 (63.1)	19.8 (67.6)	15.5 (59.9)
Daily mean °C (°F)	16.2 (61.2)	16.7 (62.1)	15.1 (59.2)	12.1 (53.8)	9.7 (49.5)	7.3 (45.1)	6.5 (43.7)	7.2 (45.0)	8.8 (47.8)	10.8 (51.4)	12.8 (55.0)	15.3 (59.5)	11.5 (52.8)
Mean daily minimum °C (°F)	11.5 (52.7)	11.9 (53.4)	10.7 (51.3)	8.5 (47.3)	6.5 (43.7)	4.2 (39.6)	3.5 (38.3)	3.8 (38.8)	4.9 (40.8)	6.5 (43.7)	8.4 (47.1)	10.7 (51.3)	7.6 (45.7)
Average rainfall mm (inches)	128.0 (5.04)	146.1 (5.75)	207.6 (8.17)	143.1 (5.63)	143.6 (5.65)	155.9 (6.14)	204.3 (8.04)	136.8 (5.39)	148.3 (5.84)	124.6 (4.91)	154.0 (6.06)	112.0 (4.41)	1,804.3 (71.03)
Source: NIWA
