= Henare Wepiha Te Wainohu =

New Zealand tribal leader

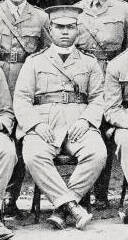
- Born: 4 June 1882; Mohaka, Hawke's Bay, New Zealand
- Died: 1 October 1920 (aged 38); Wairoa, Hawke's Bay, New Zealand
- Military career
- Branch: New Zealand Military Forces
- Service years: 1914–1919
- Rank: Major
- Units: Maori contingent New Zealand (Māori) Pioneer Battalion
- Conflicts: First World War: Gallipoli campaign; Western Front
- Awards: Mentioned in Despatches; Order of the White Eagle, 5th Class (Serbia)

Henare Wepiha Te Wainohu (4 June 1882 – 1 October 1920) was a New Zealand Anglican clergyman, and military chaplain. Of Māori descent, he was affiliated with the Ngāti Kahungunu and Ngāti Pāhauwera iwi (tribe).

Born in Mohaka in the Hawke's Bay, Wainohu was a clergyman when he was appointed the chaplain to the Māori contingent that was raised for service overseas in the early stages of the First World War. He served during the Gallipoli campaign, often helping retrieve casualties as well as providing his pastoral care. When the New Zealand (Māori) Pioneer Battalion was formed in February 1916, he was its chaplain and served on the Western Front. After the war, he was working in the Wairoa Māori District when he became ill with stomach cancer and died on 1 October 1920, aged 38. There is a memorial to Wainohu at Wairoa.

== Early life ==
Henare Wepiha Te Wainohu was born on 4 June 1880 in Mohaka, Hawke's Bay, New Zealand in 1882, one of three children of Wēpiha Te Wainohu, a farmer, and his wife Para Te Aho. His father was of the Ngāti Kahungunu and Ngāti Pāhauwera iwi (tribe). Educated at Te Aute College, he initially favoured traditional Māori beliefs such as Pai Mārire but in his later school years became a Christian. Encouraged by friends, he went on to Te Rau Theological College at Gisborne. After becoming a deacon in 1906, he was appointed a priest in December 1908 and worked in the Wairoa Māori District.

== First World War ==
On the outbreak of the First World War, Māori were encouraged to enlist in the New Zealand Expeditionary Force (NZEF) to serve in a contingent based on ethnic lines. A number of volunteers for the Māori contingent were from the Wairoa Māori District, and Wainohu was asked to join them at a training camp in Auckland to tend to their pastoral needs. He was subsequently appointed as chaplain (4th class) in the New Zealand Chaplains' Department and attached to the Māori contingent, with the rank of captain.

=== Gallipoli campaign ===
The Māori contingent of the NZEF, along with Te Wainohu, left New Zealand in February 1915. Initially stationed in Egypt, the Māori contingent was then sent to Malta to join the garrison there. Soon reinforcements for the NZEF units fighting at Gallipoli were required and the Māori contingent was sent there. They landed at Gallipoli on 3 July and settled in at No. 1 Post, where they were attached to the New Zealand Mounted Rifles Brigade. They were involved in the Battle of Sari Bair the following month; leading a prayer before the fighting, Wainohu urged the men to do their duty and to bear in mind their families back in New Zealand. During the battle itself, he assisted the contingent's medical officer, Major Peter Buck, and stretcher bearers in recovering the wounded and treating them.

In September, the Māori contingent was broken up into platoons, each attached to an infantry battalion of the NZEF for the later stages of the Gallipoli campaign. Both Wainohu and Buck had endeavoured to convince the commander of the NZEF, Lieutenant General Alexander Godley, to maintain the cohesiveness of the unit but to no avail. The break up of the contingent caused some consternation among many of its personnel and the Māori officers were criticised for not preventing it. This angered Wainohu who defended their position in a letter that was published in a Māori newspaper. Wainohu was sent to the Auckland Infantry Battalion, manning the Rhododendron Spur sector of the front line. He was devoted to the men under his charge, and rescued a number of wounded soldiers while under fire. He was wounded in September and medically evacuated. In October he went to Alexandria in Egypt on leave. There he visited Māori soldiers receiving medical care and awaiting repatriation to New Zealand.

=== Western Front ===
In February 1916, the Māori contingent formed half of the New Zealand (Māori) Pioneer Battalion, the balance being soldiers drawn from the New Zealand Mounted Rifles Brigade. Wainohu was appointed the battalion's chaplain. He served on the Western Front in France and Belgium with the battalion. In 1917, in recognition of his role at Gallipoli, he was awarded the Serbian Order of the White Eagle, 5th Class for "distinguished services rendered during the course of the campaign". He privately considered the award to be for all serving Māori soldiers.

For his services with the battalion on the Western Front during the period from February to September 1918, Wainohu was mentioned in dispatches on 31 December 1918. By this time, he held the rank of major (chaplain 3rd class). In contrast to the rest of the NZEF, the New Zealand (Māori) Pioneer Battalion returned as a unit to New Zealand after the end of the war. At a welcoming ceremony at the Auckland Domain for the battalion before it was dismissed on 6 April 1919, Wainohu spoke to a crowd of thousands on behalf of its soldiers.

== Later life ==
Returning to civilian life, Wainohu went back to Hawke's Bay and became involved in veteran's affairs in the Wairoa Māori District. He developed stomach cancer and on 1 October 1920, died at Wairoa. Buried at Mohaka, he was survived only by his wife, Ērena Kīngi, who he had married before the First World War; the couple had no children.

A memorial to Wainohu, in the form of a statue showing him in his military uniform, was unveiled by Peter Buck in Wairoa in front of 1,000 people on 16 January 1924. A portion of the memorial's inscription also offers a tribute to Māori soldiers who died while on active duty during the First World War.
