= Whakakī =

Settlement in Hawke's Bay Region, New Zealand

- Settlement
- Interactive map of Whakakī
- Coordinates: 39.037°S 177.586°E
- Country: New Zealand
- Region: Hawke's Bay Region
- Territorial authority: Wairoa District
- Ward: Wairoa General Ward; Wairoa Māori Ward
- Electorates: Napier; Ikaroa-Rāwhiti (Māori)

Government
  - Territorial authority: Wairoa District Council
  - Mayor of Wairoa: Craig Little
  - Napier MP: Katie Nimon
  - Ikaroa-Rāwhiti MP: Cushla Tangaere-Manuel

Area
  - Total: 95.27 km^{2} (36.78 sq mi)

Population (2023 Census)
  - Total: 114
  - Density: 1.20/km^{2} (3.10/sq mi)
- Postcode(s): 4196

Whakakī is a settlement east of Wairoa within the Wairoa District and Hawke's Bay Region of New Zealand's North Island. State Highway 2 runs through it.

Whakakī Lake, southwest of the settlement, is the largest freshwater lagoon on the east coast of the North Island.

Whakakī is a Māori word meaning "to fill".

== Demographics ==
Whakakī and its surrounds cover 95.27 km^{2} (36.78 sq mi). It is part of the Whakaki statistical area.

Historical population for the settlement and its surrounds
Year	Pop.	±% p.a.
2006	144	—
2013	96	−5.63%
2018	114	+3.50%
2023	114	+0.00%

Whakakī had a population of 114 in the 2023 New Zealand census, unchanged since the 2018 census, and an increase of 18 people (18.8%) since the 2013 census. There were 60 males and 54 females in 45 dwellings. 2.6% of people identified as LGBTIQ+. The median age was 48.2 years (compared with 38.1 years nationally). There were 18 people (15.8%) aged under 15 years, 21 (18.4%) aged 15 to 29, 48 (42.1%) aged 30 to 64, and 27 (23.7%) aged 65 or older.

People could identify as more than one ethnicity. The results were 36.8% European (Pākehā), and 73.7% Māori. English was spoken by 97.4%, and Māori by 34.2%. No language could be spoken by 2.6% (e.g. too young to talk). New Zealand Sign Language was known by 2.6%. The percentage of people born overseas was 2.6, compared with 28.8% nationally.

Religious affiliations were 42.1% Christian, 10.5% Māori religious beliefs, and 2.6% New Age. People who answered that they had no religion were 42.1%, and 5.3% of people did not answer the census question.

Of those at least 15 years old, 15 (15.6%) people had a bachelor's or higher degree, 54 (56.2%) had a post-high school certificate or diploma, and 30 (31.2%) people exclusively held high school qualifications. The median income was $31,900, compared with $41,500 nationally. 3 people (3.1%) earned over $100,000 compared to 12.1% nationally. The employment status of those at least 15 was 42 (43.8%) full-time, 12 (12.5%) part-time, and 9 (9.4%) unemployed.

=== Whakakī statistical area ===
Whakakī statistical area, which also includes Tuhara, covers 183.47 km^{2} (70.84 sq mi) and had an estimated population of 710 as of June 2025, with a population density of 3.9 people per km^{2}.

Historical population for the statistical area
Year	Pop.	±% p.a.
2006	726	—
2013	672	−1.10%
2018	675	+0.09%
2023	687	+0.35%

Whakakī statistical area had a population of 687 in the 2023 New Zealand census, an increase of 12 people (1.8%) since the 2018 census, and an increase of 15 people (2.2%) since the 2013 census. There were 360 males and 327 females in 228 dwellings. 1.3% of people identified as LGBTIQ+. The median age was 43.4 years (compared with 38.1 years nationally). There were 132 people (19.2%) aged under 15 years, 111 (16.2%) aged 15 to 29, 303 (44.1%) aged 30 to 64, and 144 (21.0%) aged 65 or older.

People could identify as more than one ethnicity. The results were 41.9% European (Pākehā); 72.5% Māori; 2.6% Pasifika; 0.9% Asian; 0.4% Middle Eastern, Latin American and African New Zealanders (MELAA); and 0.9% other, which includes people giving their ethnicity as "New Zealander". English was spoken by 95.6%, Māori by 24.0%, and other languages by 1.7%. No language could be spoken by 1.3% (e.g. too young to talk). New Zealand Sign Language was known by 0.4%. The percentage of people born overseas was 3.9, compared with 28.8% nationally.

Religious affiliations were 35.8% Christian, 0.9% Islam, 17.5% Māori religious beliefs, 0.4% New Age, and 0.4% other religions. People who answered that they had no religion were 38.9%, and 6.1% of people did not answer the census question.

Of those at least 15 years old, 60 (10.8%) people had a bachelor's or higher degree, 330 (59.5%) had a post-high school certificate or diploma, and 159 (28.6%) people exclusively held high school qualifications. The median income was $31,300, compared with $41,500 nationally. 24 people (4.3%) earned over $100,000 compared to 12.1% nationally. The employment status of those at least 15 was 255 (45.9%) full-time, 63 (11.4%) part-time, and 36 (6.5%) unemployed.

== Marae ==
Whakakī is a marae (meeting place) and wharenui (meeting house) for the Ngāi Te Ipu hapu (subtribe) of Ngāti Kahungunu iwi.(tribe).

== Education ==
Whakaki Native School was established in 1912. It was damaged in the 1931 Hawke's Bay earthquake and (as Whakaki Maori School) celebrated its golden jubilee in 1962. It closed in 2004.
