= Raupunga =

Settlement in Hawke's Bay Region, New Zealand

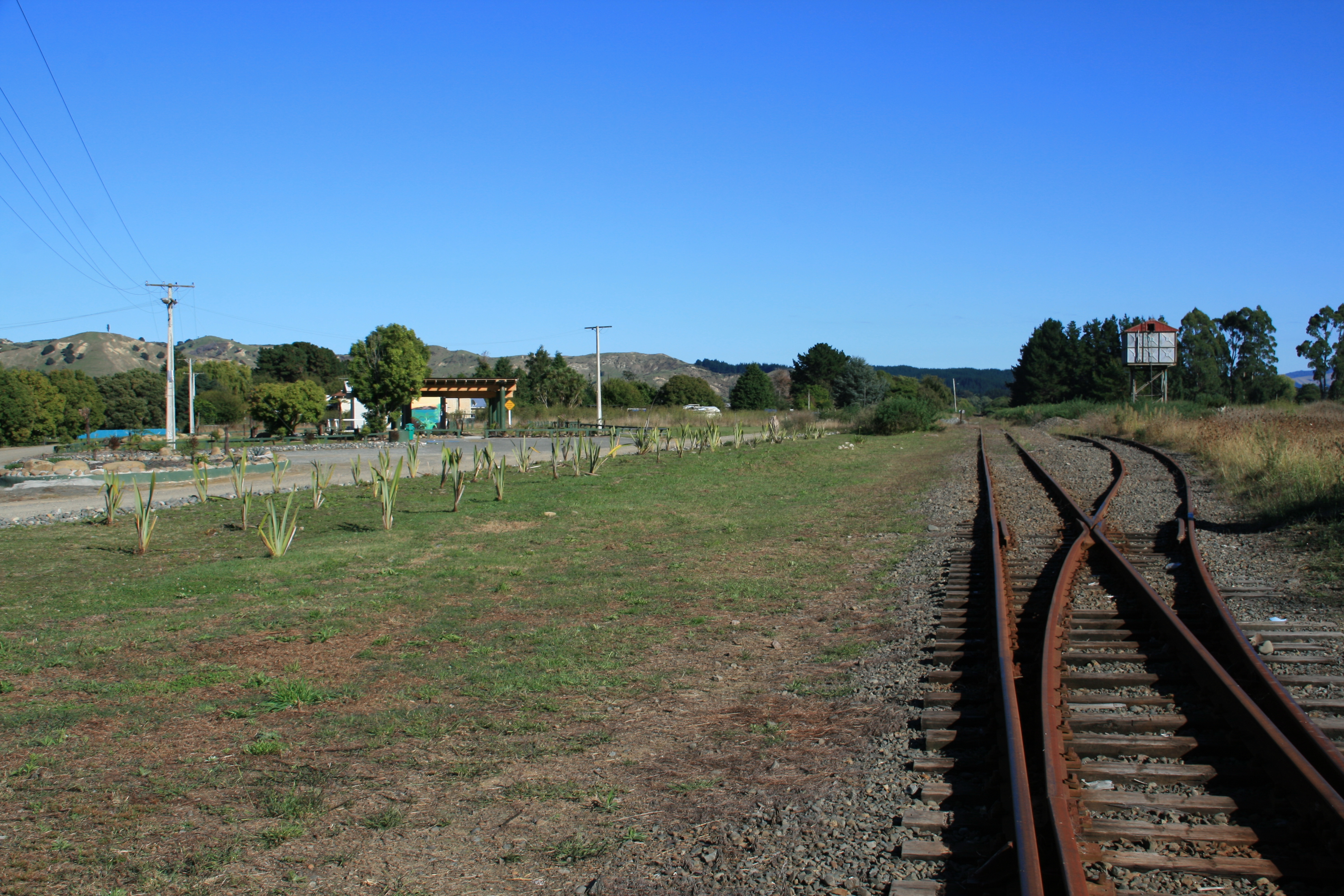
- Raupunga crossing loop and old water tower
- Interactive map of Raupunga
- Coordinates: 39°04′25″S 177°08′40″E
- Country: New Zealand
- Region: Hawke's Bay Region
- Territorial authority: Wairoa District
- Ward: Wairoa General Ward; Wairoa Māori Ward
- Electorates: Napier; Ikaroa-Rāwhiti (Māori)

Government
  - Territorial authority: Wairoa District Council
  - Mayor of Wairoa: Craig Little
  - Napier MP: Katie Nimon
  - Ikaroa-Rāwhiti MP: Cushla Tangaere-Manuel

Area
  - Total: 137.40 km^{2} (53.05 sq mi)

Population (2023 Census)
  - Total: 258
  - Density: 1.88/km^{2} (4.86/sq mi)

Raupunga is a small settlement in the northern Hawke's Bay Region of New Zealand's eastern North Island. It is located close to the country's highest railway bridge, the Mohaka Viaduct, which crosses the Mohaka River. The village has a predominantly Māori population as of the 2018 Census.

The village got running water for the first time in 2017, when a 9 kilometre electric pump system was built from Mangawharangi Stream for $1 million. Until that time, many of the 56 households had got water from buckets.

== Demographics ==
Raupunga and its surrounds cover 137.40 km^{2} (53.05 sq mi). It is part of the Maungataniwha-Raupunga statistical area.

Historical population for Raupunga and surrounds
Year	Pop.	±% p.a.
2006	237	—
2013	216	−1.32%
2018	249	+2.88%
2023	258	+0.71%

Raupunga had a population of 258 in the 2023 New Zealand census, an increase of 9 people (3.6%) since the 2018 census, and an increase of 42 people (19.4%) since the 2013 census. There were 132 males and 126 females in 84 dwellings. 1.2% of people identified as LGBTIQ+. There were 81 people (31.4%) aged under 15 years, 39 (15.1%) aged 15 to 29, 105 (40.7%) aged 30 to 64, and 39 (15.1%) aged 65 or older.

People could identify as more than one ethnicity. The results were 15.1% European (Pākehā), 93.0% Māori, 4.7% Pasifika, and 1.2% other, which includes people giving their ethnicity as "New Zealander". English was spoken by 96.5%, Māori by 22.1%, and other languages by 1.2%. No language could be spoken by 1.2% (e.g. too young to talk). New Zealand Sign Language was known by 1.2%. The percentage of people born overseas was 2.3, compared with 28.8% nationally.

Religious affiliations were 43.0% Christian, 18.6% Māori religious beliefs, and 1.2% New Age. People who answered that they had no religion were 37.2%, and 2.3% of people did not answer the census question.

Of those at least 15 years old, 9 (5.1%) people had a bachelor's or higher degree, 120 (67.8%) had a post-high school certificate or diploma, and 54 (30.5%) people exclusively held high school qualifications. 9 people (5.1%) earned over $100,000 compared to 12.1% nationally. The employment status of those at least 15 was 87 (49.2%) full-time, 27 (15.3%) part-time, and 9 (5.1%) unemployed.

=== Maungataniwha-Raupunga statistical area ===
Maungataniwha-Raupunga statistical area, which includes Mohaka, Kotemaori, Putere and Tuai, covers 2,081.73 km^{2} (803.76 sq mi) and had an estimated population of 1,210 as of June 2025, with a population density of 0.58 people per km^{2}.

Historical population of Maungataniwha-Raupunga
Year	Pop.	±% p.a.
2006	1,242	—
2013	1,167	−0.89%
2018	1,188	+0.36%
2023	1,170	−0.30%

Maungataniwha-Raupunga had a population of 1,170 in the 2023 New Zealand census, a decrease of 18 people (−1.5%) since the 2018 census, and an increase of 3 people (0.3%) since the 2013 census. There were 609 males, 555 females, and 3 people of other genders in 435 dwellings. 1.5% of people identified as LGBTIQ+. The median age was 36.0 years (compared with 38.1 years nationally). There were 279 people (23.8%) aged under 15 years, 207 (17.7%) aged 15 to 29, 510 (43.6%) aged 30 to 64, and 177 (15.1%) aged 65 or older.

People could identify as more than one ethnicity. The results were 47.4% European (Pākehā), 62.8% Māori, 5.4% Pasifika, and 3.6% other, which includes people giving their ethnicity as "New Zealander". English was spoken by 95.9%, Māori by 20.8%, and other languages by 3.1%. No language could be spoken by 1.5% (e.g. too young to talk). New Zealand Sign Language was known by 0.3%. The percentage of people born overseas was 7.7, compared with 28.8% nationally.

Religious affiliations were 36.7% Christian, 14.1% Māori religious beliefs, 0.5% New Age, and 0.3% other religions. People who answered that they had no religion were 42.6%, and 6.4% of people did not answer the census question.

Of those at least 15 years old, 84 (9.4%) people had a bachelor's or higher degree, 579 (65.0%) had a post-high school certificate or diploma, and 228 (25.6%) people exclusively held high school qualifications. The median income was $34,900, compared with $41,500 nationally. 36 people (4.0%) earned over $100,000 compared to 12.1% nationally. The employment status of those at least 15 was 435 (48.8%) full-time, 129 (14.5%) part-time, and 48 (5.4%) unemployed.

== Marae ==
Raupunga includes a number of marae (meeting grounds) and wharenui (meeting houses) for the local iwi (tribe) of Ngāti Kahungunu and its hapū (sub-tribes):

- Kurahikakawa Marae, affiliated with Ngāti Pāhauwera hapū, and Ngāti Pāhauwera iwi.
- Rangiāhua marae and Te Poho o Tamaterangi wharenui, affiliated with Ngāi Tamaterangi hapū.
- Raupunga Marae and Te Huki wharenui, affiliated with Ngāti Pāhauwera hapū.

In October 2020, the Government committed $1,949,075 from the Provincial Growth Fund to upgrade Rangiāhua, Raupunga and 22 other Ngāti Kahungunu marae. The funding was expected to create 164 jobs.
