= Māhia Peninsula =

Peninsula in Hawke's Bay, New Zealand

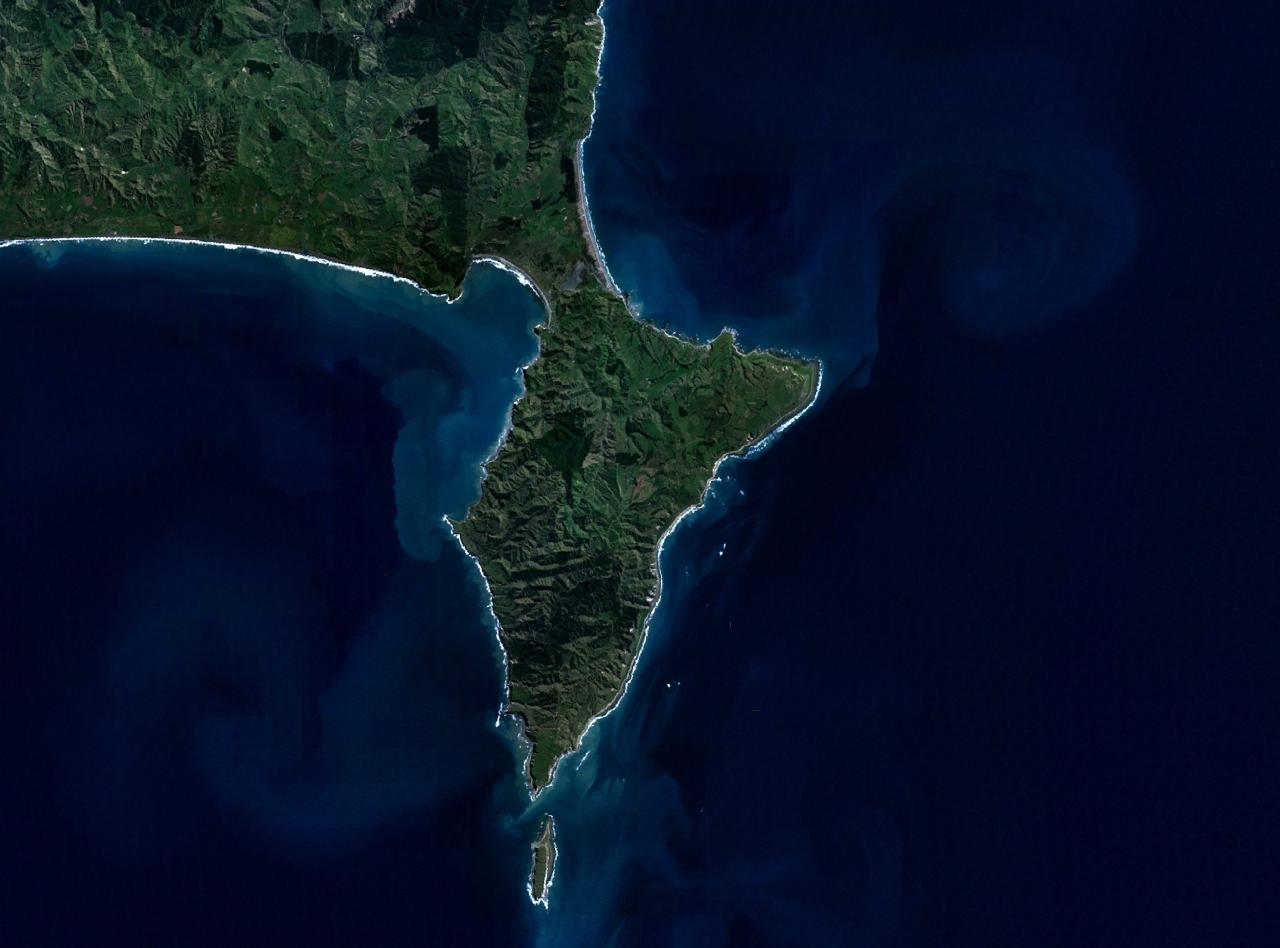
- NASA satellite image of Māhia Peninsula
- Interactive map of Māhia Peninsula
- Coordinates: 39°09′S 177°54′E
- Country: New Zealand
- Region: Hawke's Bay
- Territorial authority: Wairoa
- Ward: Wairoa General Ward; Wairoa Māori Ward
- Electorates: Napier; Ikaroa-Rāwhiti (Māori)

Government
  - Territorial authority: Wairoa District Council
  - Mayor of Wairoa: Craig Little
  - Napier MP: Katie Nimon
  - Ikaroa-Rāwhiti MP: Cushla Tangaere-Manuel

Area
  - Total: 157.25 km^{2} (60.71 sq mi)
- Time zone: UTC+12 (NZST)
  - Summer (DST): UTC+13 (NZDT)
- Postcode: 4198

Māhia Peninsula (Māori: Te Māhia) is located on the east coast of New Zealand's North Island, in the Hawke's Bay region, between the towns of Wairoa and Gisborne.

It includes Rocket Lab's Launch Complex 1, located near Ahuriri Point at the southern tip of the Māhia Peninsula, for launching its Electron rockets.

Since 2018, it has been used as a commercial launcher of small satellites in the range of 135–235 kg, and miniature satellites called CubeSats. New Zealand's first orbital space launch took place from Launch Complex 1 on 21 January 2018.

== Geography ==
The peninsula is 21.7 kilometres (13.5 mi) long and 11.3 km (7 mi) wide. Its highest point is Rahuimokairoa, 397 m (1,302 ft) above sea level. The peninsula was once an island, but now a tombolo joins it to the North Island.

== Demographics ==
Māhia Beach, which is on the northeast coast of the peninsula, is described by Statistics New Zealand as a rural settlement. It covers 4.05 km^{2} (1.56 sq mi) and had an estimated population of 250 as of June 2025, with a population density of 62 people per km^{2}. It is part of the larger Mahia statistical area.

Historical population for Mahia Beach
| Year | Pop. | ±% p.a. |
|---|---|---|
| 2006 | 240 | — |
| 2013 | 186 | −3.58% |
| 2018 | 183 | −0.32% |
| 2023 | 246 | +6.10% |

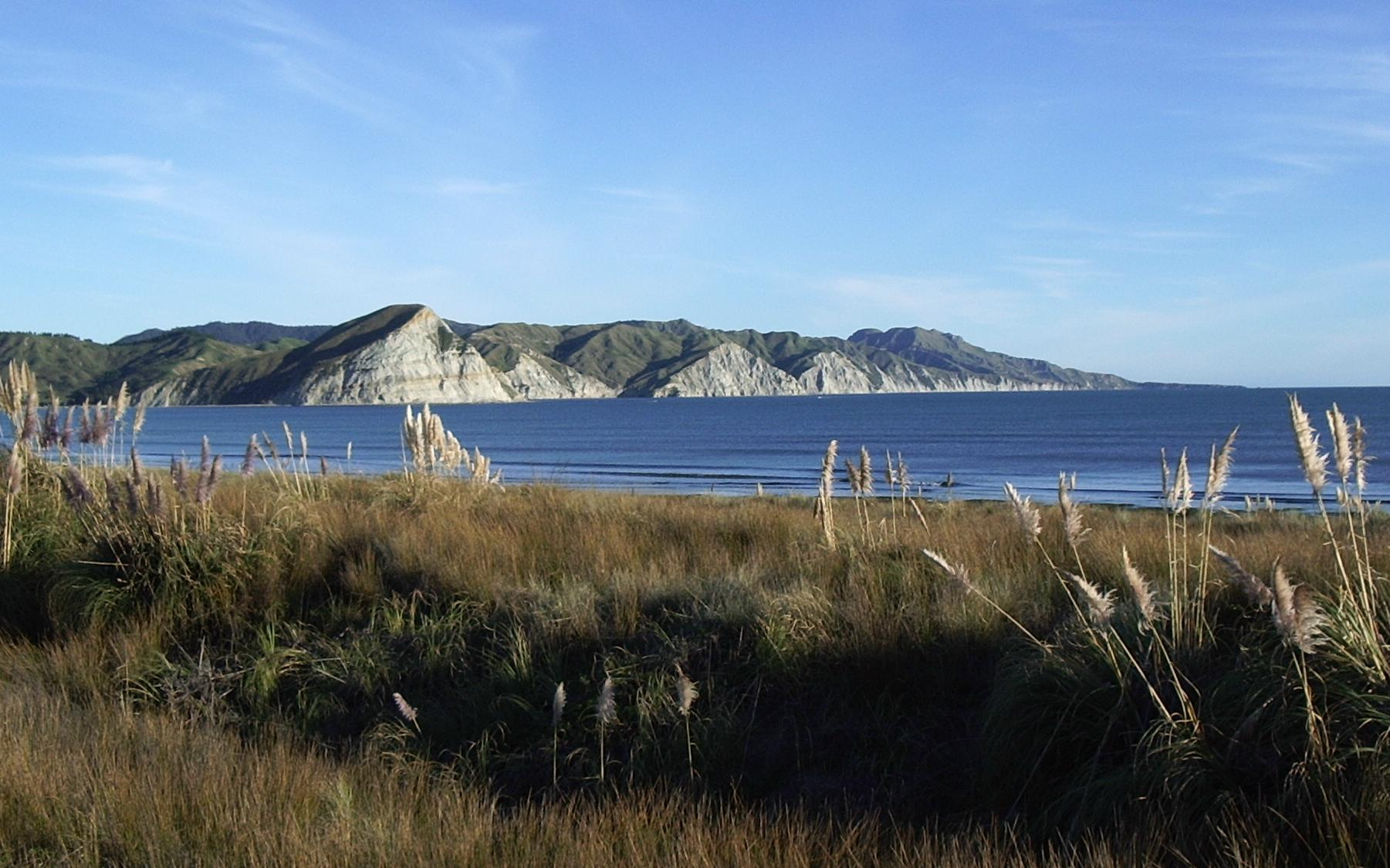
South coast of Māhia peninsula

Mahia Beach had a population of 246 in the 2023 New Zealand census, an increase of 63 people (34.4%) since the 2018 census, and an increase of 60 people (32.3%) since the 2013 census. There were 126 males and 120 females in 108 dwellings. The median age was 61.1 years (compared with 38.1 years nationally). There were 33 people (13.4%) aged under 15 years, 15 (6.1%) aged 15 to 29, 93 (37.8%) aged 30 to 64, and 108 (43.9%) aged 65 or older.

People could identify as more than one ethnicity. The results were 79.3% European (Pākehā), 34.1% Māori, 2.4% Pasifika, 2.4% Asian, and 2.4% other, which includes people giving their ethnicity as "New Zealander". English was spoken by 98.8%, Māori by 11.0%, and other languages by 7.3%. The percentage of people born overseas was 7.3, compared with 28.8% nationally.

Religious affiliations were 35.4% Christian, 2.4% Māori religious beliefs, and 1.2% Buddhist. People who answered that they had no religion were 56.1%, and 6.1% of people did not answer the census question.

Of those at least 15 years old, 45 (21.1%) people had a bachelor's or higher degree, 126 (59.2%) had a post-high school certificate or diploma, and 45 (21.1%) people exclusively held high school qualifications. The median income was $31,900, compared with $41,500 nationally. 18 people (8.5%) earned over $100,000 compared to 12.1% nationally. The employment status of those at least 15 was 75 (35.2%) full-time, 30 (14.1%) part-time, and 6 (2.8%) unemployed.

=== Mahia statistical area ===
Mahia statistical area, which includes Nūhaka, covers 471.97 km^{2} (182.23 sq mi) and had an estimated population of 1,390 as of June 2025, with a population density of 2.9 people per km^{2}. The peninsula itself covers 157.25 km^{2} (60.71 sq mi)

Historical population for Mahia statistical area
| Year | Pop. | ±% p.a. |
|---|---|---|
| 2006 | 1,272 | — |
| 2013 | 1,104 | −2.00% |
| 2018 | 1,119 | +0.27% |
| 2023 | 1,380 | +4.28% |

Mahia had a population of 1,380 in the 2023 New Zealand census, an increase of 261 people (23.3%) since the 2018 census, and an increase of 276 people (25.0%) since the 2013 census. There were 705 males, 672 females, and 3 people of other genders in 519 dwellings. 2.2% of people identified as LGBTIQ+. The median age was 49.7 years (compared with 38.1 years nationally). There were 234 people (17.0%) aged under 15 years, 186 (13.5%) aged 15 to 29, 597 (43.3%) aged 30 to 64, and 363 (26.3%) aged 65 or older.

People could identify as more than one ethnicity. The results were 54.6% European (Pākehā); 62.6% Māori; 3.9% Pasifika; 1.5% Asian; 0.2% Middle Eastern, Latin American and African New Zealanders (MELAA); and 1.1% other, which includes people giving their ethnicity as "New Zealander". English was spoken by 97.0%, Māori by 20.0%, Samoan by 0.2%, and other languages by 4.3%. No language could be spoken by 1.1% (e.g. too young to talk). New Zealand Sign Language was known by 0.7%. The percentage of people born overseas was 7.2, compared with 28.8% nationally.

Religious affiliations were 37.8% Christian, 7.0% Māori religious beliefs, 0.2% Buddhist, 0.4% New Age, 0.4% Jewish, and 0.9% other religions. People who answered that they had no religion were 47.6%, and 6.3% of people did not answer the census question.

Of those at least 15 years old, 210 (18.3%) people had a bachelor's or higher degree, 639 (55.8%) had a post-high school certificate or diploma, and 306 (26.7%) people exclusively held high school qualifications. The median income was $30,100, compared with $41,500 nationally. 63 people (5.5%) earned over $100,000 compared to 12.1% nationally. The employment status of those at least 15 was 447 (39.0%) full-time, 168 (14.7%) part-time, and 51 (4.5%) unemployed.

== History and culture ==
=== Māori history ===
In Maori legend, Whatonga, who came to New Zealand in search of his grandfather Toi, settled at Mahia.

The peninsula is the tribal area of the Ngāti Rongomaiwahine iwi. The word māhia means "indistinct sound" or "scrofulous swelling". The name "Te Māhia" comes from "Te Māhia-mai-tawhiti" (the sound heard from a distance).

Portland Island, also called Waikawa, is a small island off the southern tip of Mahia Peninsula. It was named Waikawa by Kahungunu when he visited there to look for fresh drinking water and only found salt water – Waikawa means "sour water". Portland Island had a lighthouse, first lit in February 1878 and then replaced with a fully electrified unmanned town in 1955 .

=== European history ===
Shore whaling was briefly important on the Mahia Peninsula. Early whalers had a whaling station on the farm "Kini Kini", sheltered by "Long Point" on the west coast of the peninsula. The peninsula community these days is still generally a mix of Maori and European.

Former Prime Minister Jacinda Ardern was proposed to by her partner, Clarke Gayford, on Mokotahi Hill.

=== Marae ===
There are five marae in the Mahia area affiliated with the hapū of Rongomaiwahine iwi:

- The Kaiuku or Oku-ra-renga Marae and its Kiwi meeting house are affiliated with the hapū of Ngāi Tama and Ngāi Tū
- Te Rākatō Marae is affiliated with the hapū of Ngāi Te Rākatō.
- Tuahuru Marae and its Hine te Rongo meeting house are affiliated with the hapū of Ngai Tama and Ngāi Tū.
- Ruawharo Marae is also affiliated with Ngai Tama.
- Mahanga Marae and its meeting house, Te Poho o Rongomaiwahine, are home to the hapū, Te Hokowhitu o Ngai Tu.

In October 2020, the Government committed $1,949,075 from the Provincial Growth Fund to upgrade 24 Ngāti Kahungunu marae, including both Kaiuku and Ruawharo Marae, creating 164 jobs. It also committed $102,644 to upgrading Tuahuru Marae, creating 4 jobs.

== Economy ==
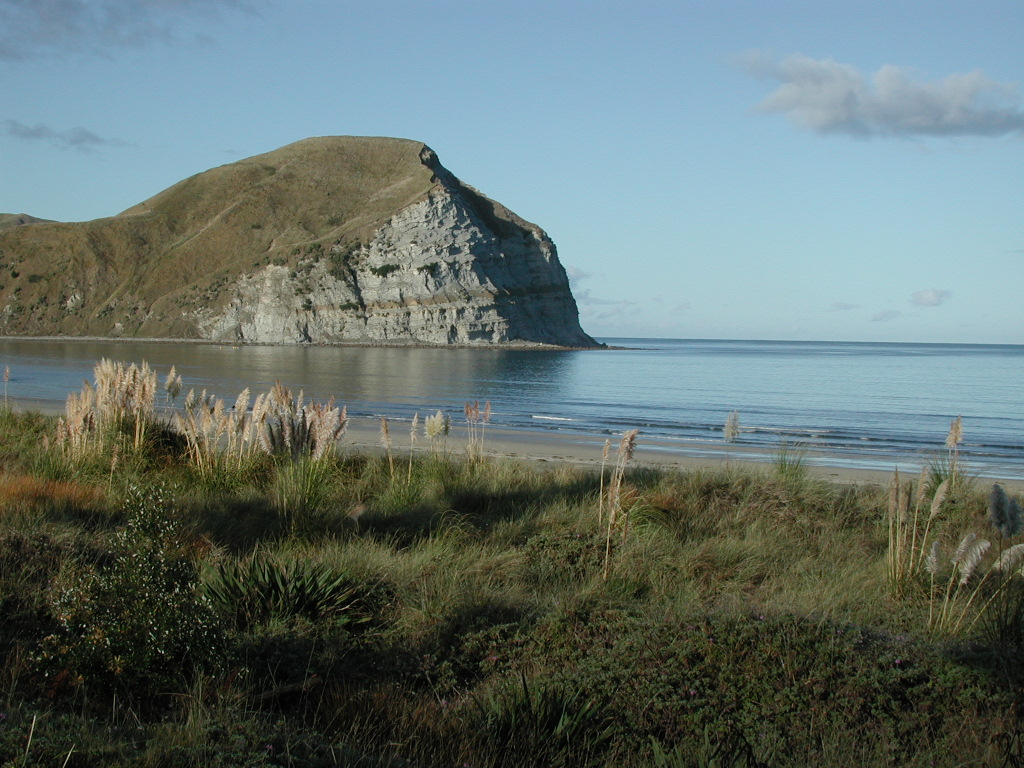
Mahia Beach in the morning

Sheep and cattle farms are an important part for the local community, but tourism is now the peninsula's main industry. Mahia's population swells greatly during the warmer months and in particular during school holidays.

Mahia is well known for its surf, scuba diving, hiking, and fishing. Morere Hot Springs is 15 minutes away, towards Gisborne. The area is a popular school holiday destination and contains a holiday park dating back to the 1960s. The remaining settlement consists mostly of holiday houses and baches.

From 2007 to 2010 Mahia became known for the presence of Moko, a dolphin.

The peninsula is the location of Rocket Lab Launch Complex 1, which is used to launch commercial and government satellites on the company's Electron orbital launch vehicle.

== Education ==
Te Mahia School is a year 1–8 co-educational state primary school. It is a decile 1 school with a roll of 57 as of July 2026. The school opened in 1917.

== Climate ==
Climate data for Mahia (1991–2020 normals, extremes 1990–present)
| Month | Jan | Feb | Mar | Apr | May | Jun | Jul | Aug | Sep | Oct | Nov | Dec | Year |
|---|---|---|---|---|---|---|---|---|---|---|---|---|---|
| Record high °C (°F) | 32.6 (90.7) | 34.9 (94.8) | 30.9 (87.6) | 26.5 (79.7) | 26.0 (78.8) | 21.0 (69.8) | 20.6 (69.1) | 21.5 (70.7) | 23.8 (74.8) | 26.4 (79.5) | 28.1 (82.6) | 30.0 (86.0) | 34.9 (94.8) |
| Mean daily maximum °C (°F) | 21.8 (71.2) | 21.7 (71.1) | 20.2 (68.4) | 17.9 (64.2) | 15.8 (60.4) | 13.5 (56.3) | 12.7 (54.9) | 13.2 (55.8) | 14.9 (58.8) | 16.7 (62.1) | 18.1 (64.6) | 20.1 (68.2) | 17.2 (63.0) |
| Daily mean °C (°F) | 18.4 (65.1) | 18.6 (65.5) | 17.1 (62.8) | 15.1 (59.2) | 13.2 (55.8) | 11.0 (51.8) | 10.3 (50.5) | 10.5 (50.9) | 11.9 (53.4) | 13.4 (56.1) | 14.8 (58.6) | 16.8 (62.2) | 14.3 (57.7) |
| Mean daily minimum °C (°F) | 14.9 (58.8) | 15.4 (59.7) | 14.1 (57.4) | 12.3 (54.1) | 10.5 (50.9) | 8.5 (47.3) | 7.8 (46.0) | 7.9 (46.2) | 8.9 (48.0) | 10.1 (50.2) | 11.4 (52.5) | 13.5 (56.3) | 11.3 (52.3) |
| Record low °C (°F) | 7.3 (45.1) | 6.0 (42.8) | 6.0 (42.8) | 4.6 (40.3) | 1.3 (34.3) | 2.5 (36.5) | 0.5 (32.9) | 0.6 (33.1) | 2.0 (35.6) | 3.0 (37.4) | 4.3 (39.7) | 5.9 (42.6) | 0.5 (32.9) |
| Average rainfall mm (inches) | 53.6 (2.11) | 67.3 (2.65) | 89.6 (3.53) | 97.4 (3.83) | 99.7 (3.93) | 123.6 (4.87) | 143.6 (5.65) | 101.1 (3.98) | 70.2 (2.76) | 69.6 (2.74) | 72.5 (2.85) | 68.3 (2.69) | 1,056.5 (41.59) |
Source: NIWA
