= Ahuriri Point =

Southernmost point of the Māhia Peninsula in New Zealand

Coordinates: 39.2648°S 177.8644°E

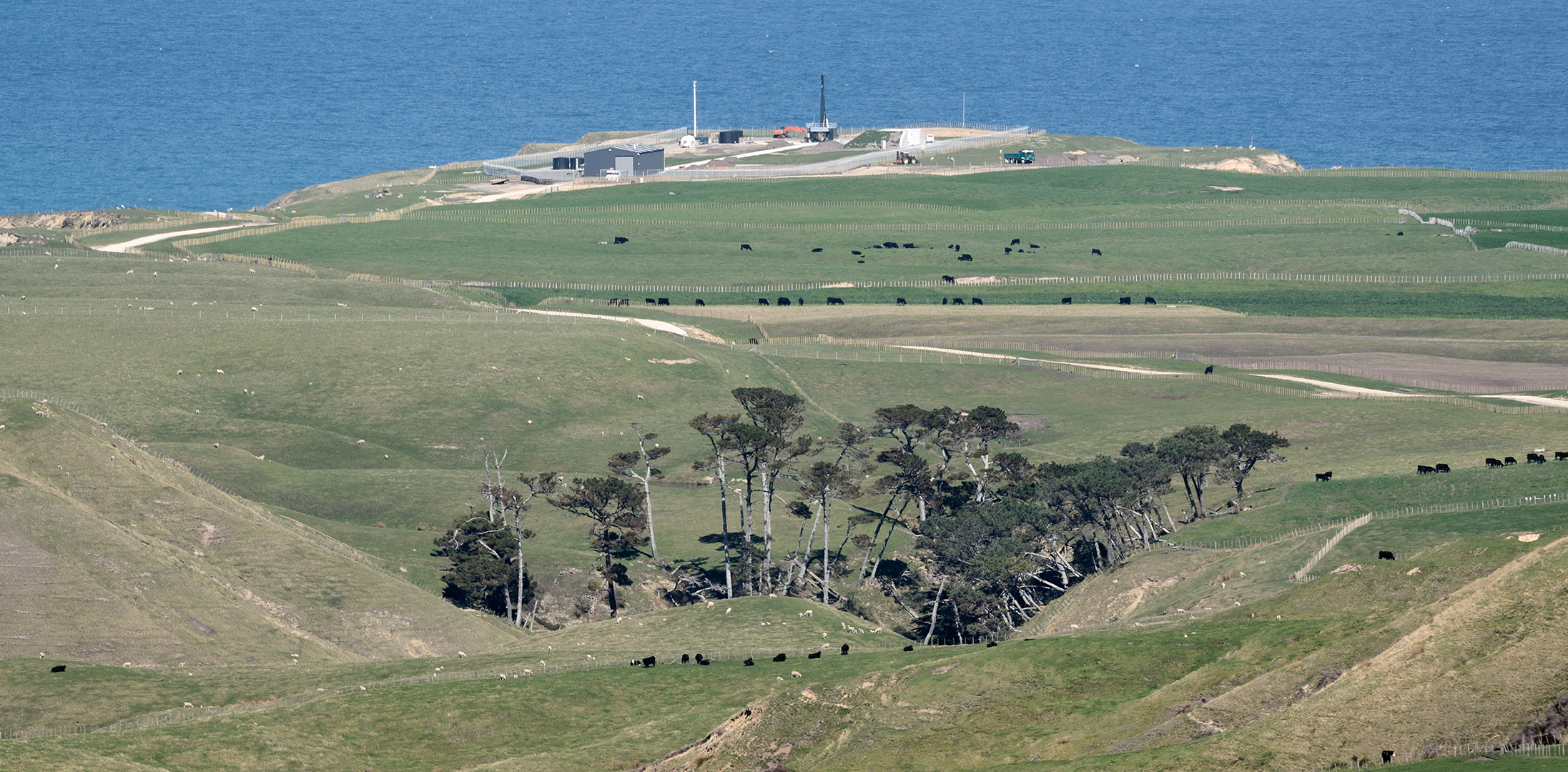
Ahuriri Point and Rocket Lab Launch Complex 1

Ahuriri Point is the southernmost point of the Māhia Peninsula, in the northern Hawke's Bay Region of New Zealand's eastern North Island. Portland Island lies 1200 metres to the south of Ahuriri Point.

== Rocket range ==
The Rocket Lab company has set up their Launch Complex 1 close to Ahuriri Point to launch their Electron rocket. Test launches of the Electron started in 2017. During regular operations, it is used as a commercial launcher of small satellites in the range of 300-500 pounds, and miniature satellites called CubeSats. New Zealand's first orbital space launch took place from Launch Complex 1 on 21 January 2018.
