= Wairoa River =

Wairoa River may refer to any of these rivers in New Zealand:

- Wairoa River (Auckland)
- Wairoa River (Bay of Plenty)
- Wairoa River (Hawke's Bay)
- Wairoa River (Northland)
- Wairoa River (Tasman)

== Other ==
- Wairoa Stream (Mōtītī Island)
