= Wairoa College =

Location
- Lucknow St, Wairoa, Hawke's Bay, New Zealand; 39°02′06″S 177°24′50″E

Information
- Type: State coed secondary (Year 7–13)
- Motto: Kia Mataara (Be Vigilant)
- Ministry of Education Institution no.: 214
- Principal: Drew Manning
- Enrolment: 360 (July 2026)
- Socio-economic decile: 1C
- Website: www.wairoacollege.school.nz

Wairoa College is a co-educational secondary school located in Wairoa, Hawkes Bay, New Zealand. It was expanded to include students from years 7 and 8 in 2005. A building project to accommodate the increased roll was complete by 2008. Wairoa College offers a curriculum designed around NCEA and WAI (Wairoa Achievement Initiative) assessments.
