= Portland Island (New Zealand) =

Island off the Mahia Peninsula, New Zealand

Native name: Waikawa
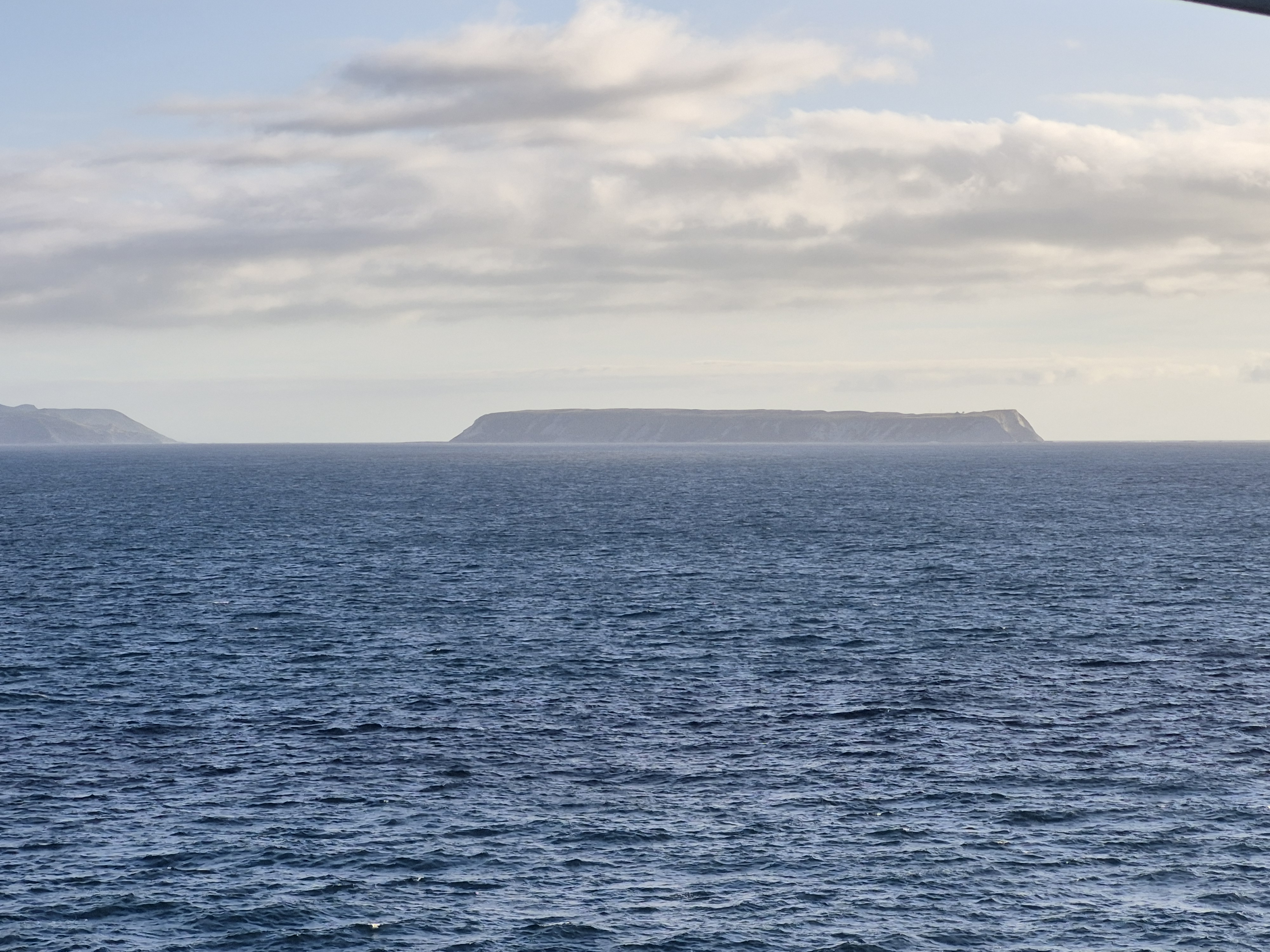
- Portland Island (center)
- Interactive map of Portland Island

Geography
- Location: Hawke's Bay Region
- Coordinates: 39°17′S 177°52′E
- Area: 1.4–3.0 km^{2} (0.54–1.16 sq mi)
- Length: 3.26 km (2.026 mi)
- Width: 0.65 - 0.98 km (-0.205 mi)
- Highest elevation: 106 m (348 ft)

Administration
- New Zealand

Portland Island, also called Waikawa, is a small island off the southern tip of the Māhia Peninsula on the North Island of New Zealand. It is used for sheep farming.

The area of the island fluctuates rapidly between high and low tides due to a shelf of rocks surrounding the east, north and west coast of the island. During low tide the area of the island can grow up to 3 km^{2}, while during high tide it shrinks down to only 1.4 km^{2}. This makes access by boat to the island rather difficult, despite it being only a kilometer offshore.

== Gallery ==
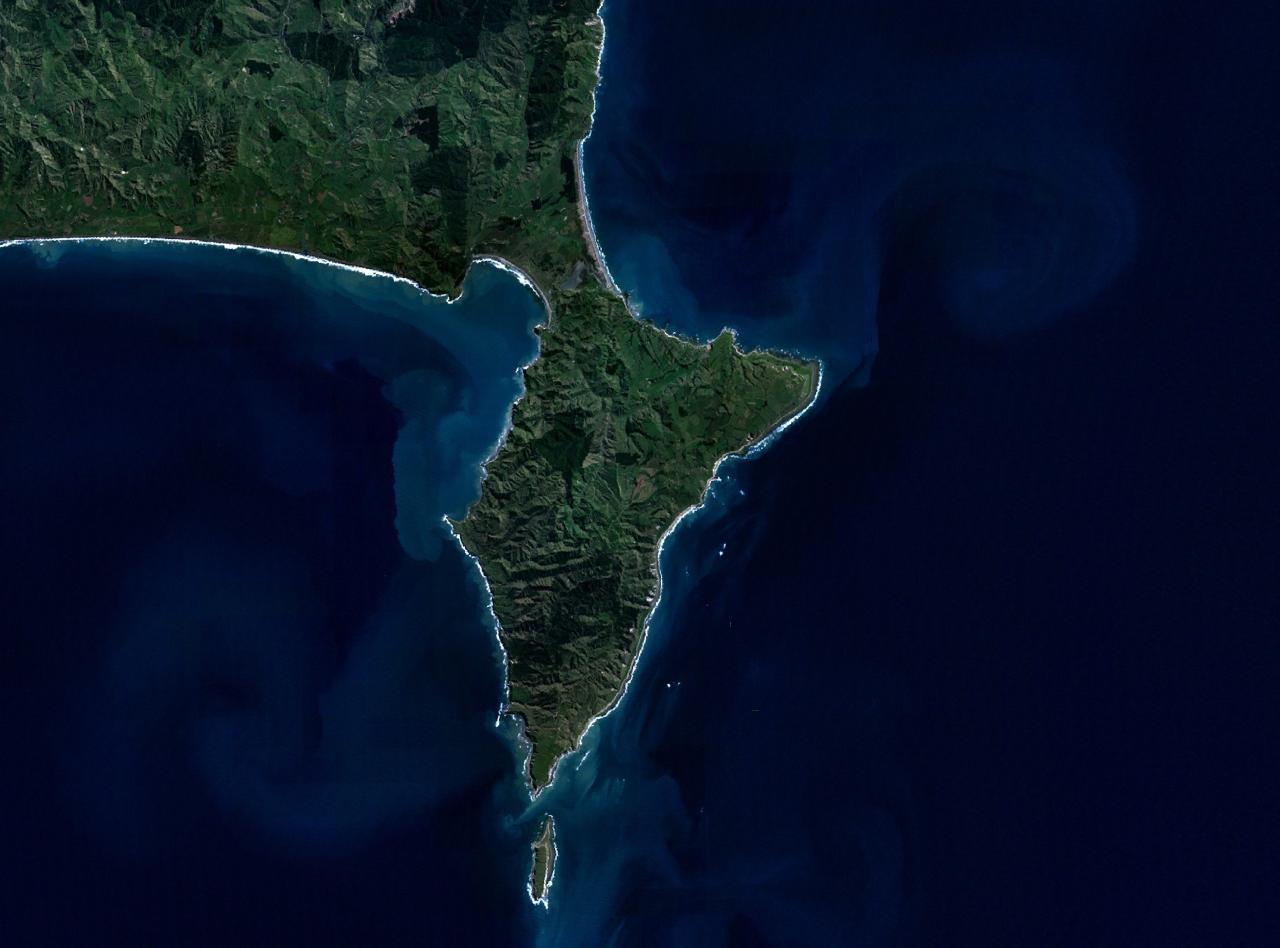
NASA satellite image of the Māhia Peninsula, showing Portland Island close to the peninsula's southern tip

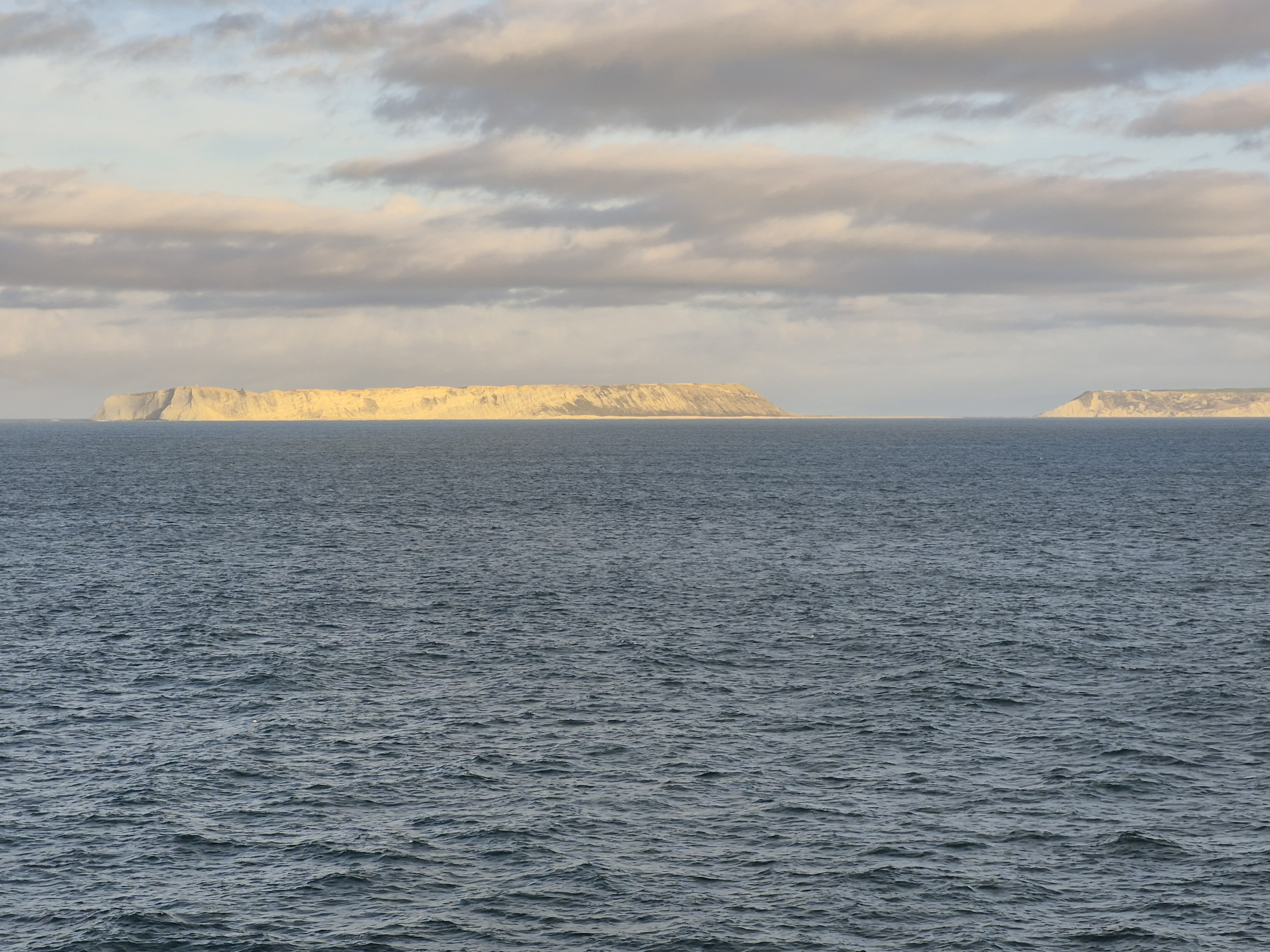
Portland Island and southern tip of Māhia Peninsula from the east

== See also ==
- Lists of islands
  - List of islands of New Zealand
- Desert island
