= Wairau =

Wairau may refer to:

- Wairau (New Zealand electorate), parliamentary electorate in the Marlborough Region of New Zealand
- Wairau Bar, a gravel bar formed where the Wairau River meets the sea in Cloudy Bay, Marlborough, New Zealand
- Wairau Fault, an active fault in the northeastern part of South Island, New Zealand
- Wairau River, Marlborough, New Zealand
- Wairau Valley, Marlborough, New Zealand
- Wairau Valley, Auckland, New Zealand
- Wairau Affray, an 1843 conflict in the New Zealand Land Wars
