= Wairoa Stream (Mōtītī Island) =

Stream on Mōtītī Island, New Zealand

- Location of Wairoa Stream in New Zealand

Location
- Country: New Zealand
- Region: Bay of Plenty

Physical characteristics
- Source
  - coordinates: 37.616832°S 176.43116°E
  - elevation: 30 metres (98 ft)
- Mouth: Bay of Plenty
  - coordinates: 37.614112°S 176.431632°E
  - elevation: 0 metres (0 ft)
- Length: 400 metres (1,300 ft)

The Wairoa Stream is found on Mōtītī Island in the Bay of Plenty, New Zealand.

A short stream, it runs from south to north roughly parallel with the Tumu Stream, which lies some 500 metres to the west. A larger stream, Waihi Stream, is located just to the east of Wairoa Stream. The stream was formerly gazetted as "Weiroa Stream", however this spelling mistake was corrected in 1941.
