= Wairua =

Wairua may refer to:

- Wairua River, Wairua River is a river of Northland, New Zealand
  - Wairua Falls, on the river
- Wairua, a genus of spiders synonymized with Nomaua
- Wairua (spirit), the spirit or soul in Māori language
- "Wairua", a 2017 song by Maimoa

== See also ==
- Radula marginata or Wairuakohu, a species of plant in genus Radula, a genus of liverworts
