= Wairoa District =

- Territorial authority district
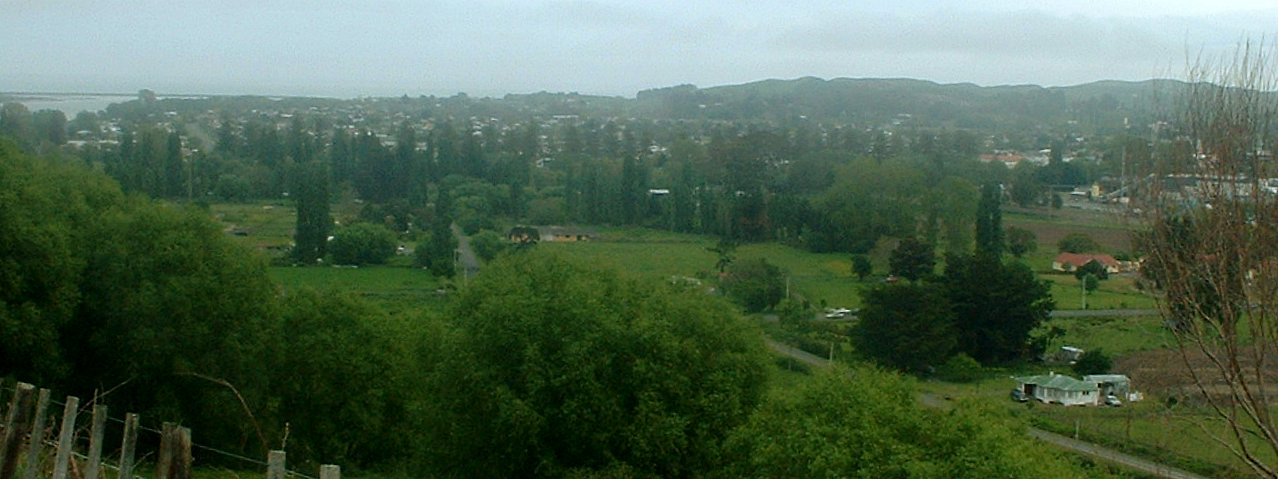

- Wairoa district within the North Island
- Coordinates: 39°02′02″S 177°25′23″E
- Country: New Zealand
- Region: Hawke's Bay Region
- Wards: General Ward; Māori Ward
- Seat: Wairoa

Government
  - Mayor: Craig Little
  - Deputy Mayor: Benita Cairns
  - Territorial authority: Wairoa District Council

Area
  - Total: 4,130 km^{2} (1,590 sq mi)
  - Land: 4,078.45 km^{2} (1,574.70 sq mi)

Population (June 2025)
  - Total: 8,940
  - Density: 2.19/km^{2} (5.68/sq mi)
- Time zone: UTC+12 (NZST)
  - Summer (DST): UTC+13 (NZDT)
- Postcode(s): Map of postcodes
- Area code: 06
- Website: www.wairoadc.govt.nz

Wairoa District is a territorial authority district within the Hawke's Bay Region in the North Island of New Zealand. The Wairoa District Council is headquartered in the largest town, Wairoa. The district covers the northern half of the Hawke's Bay coast, extending from Māhia Peninsula to Lake Waikaremoana, and south to the mouth of the Waikare River.

The district has an area of 4,130 square kilometres, of which 4,078 square kilometres are land. The population was 8,940 as of June 2025.

The word Wairoa is Māori for "long water", referring to the length of the tranquil Wairoa River that runs throughout the town. The district has been known historically as Te Wairoa (the long water), and use of the phrase Te Wairoa when referring to the district is steadily increasing, in keeping with the district's vision of being bilingual by 2040.

The Ruakituri River and the Māhia Peninsula are tourist destinations in the district.

Craig Little JP was elected as mayor in the 2013 local elections.

== Council history ==
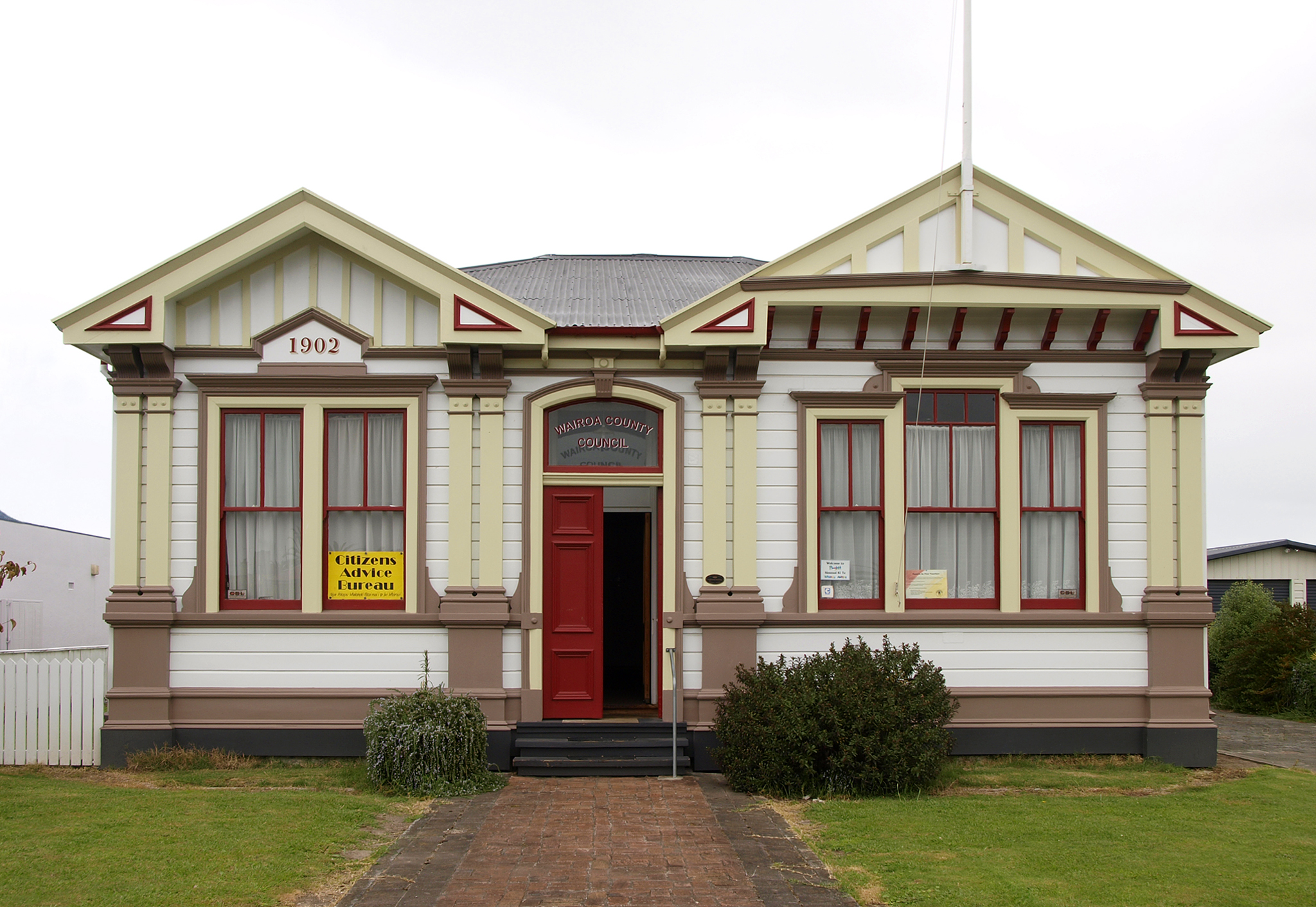
Wairoa County Council building

Wairoa County was established in 1876 and a separate Wairoa Borough was created in 1909. The two merged into the Wairoa District in the 1989 local government reforms.

In 2014, following the election of a new Council and the appointment of a new Chief Executive, the district embarked on an ambitious programme of attracting novel and high-tech industry to the district in an effort to arrest and reverse the gradual population decline and loss of services that the community had been suffering from for the previous 20 years.

A $5M investment by the central government in improved medical facilities, and, commencing July 2014, an increased emphasis by the Wairoa District Council on economic development (particularly aimed at encouragement of diversification of agribusiness, ecotourism, digital creative industry attraction, and attraction of new and returning residents) has led to an increasingly positive community view of the district's future.

As a result of these economic development efforts, in 2016, Rocket Lab announced that it was establishing its Orbital Launch Site (known as Launch Complex 1) for its Electron Vehicle on the Māhia Peninsula. The first test launch was in May 2017. The Electron vehicle is capable of delivering satellites into Low Earth Orbit, using innovative New Zealand technology. The section of Te Wairoa coastline along which satisfactory space launch viewing experiences are likely is known as 'Space Coast New Zealand' – a more modest analogue of the Florida Space Coast in the United States. The New Zealand Space Agency has been established to manage New Zealand space treaties and activity.

== Demographics ==
Wairoa District covers 4,078.45 km^{2} (1,574.70 sq mi) and had an estimated population of 8,940 as of June 2025, with a population density of 2.2 people per km^{2}.

Historical population
Year	Pop.	±% p.a.
2006	8,484	—
2013	7,890	−1.03%
2018	8,367	+1.18%
2023	8,826	+1.07%

Wairoa District had a population of 8,826 in the 2023 New Zealand census, an increase of 459 people (5.5%) since the 2018 census, and an increase of 936 people (11.9%) since the 2013 census. There were 4,437 males, 4,368 females and 18 people of other genders in 3,120 dwellings. 1.9% of people identified as LGBTIQ+. The median age was 38.6 years (compared with 38.1 years nationally). There were 2,013 people (22.8%) aged under 15 years, 1,527 (17.3%) aged 15 to 29, 3,642 (41.3%) aged 30 to 64, and 1,638 (18.6%) aged 65 or older.

People could identify as more than one ethnicity. The results were 46.9% European (Pākehā); 68.5% Māori; 4.2% Pasifika; 1.7% Asian; 0.2% Middle Eastern, Latin American and African New Zealanders (MELAA); and 1.6% other, which includes people giving their ethnicity as "New Zealander". English was spoken by 96.2%, Māori language by 20.9%, Samoan by 0.2% and other languages by 2.8%. No language could be spoken by 2.1% (e.g. too young to talk). New Zealand Sign Language was known by 0.6%. The percentage of people born overseas was 6.7, compared with 28.8% nationally.

Religious affiliations were 35.0% Christian, 0.2% Hindu, 0.4% Islam, 13.7% Māori religious beliefs, 0.1% Buddhist, 0.3% New Age, 0.1% Jewish, and 0.6% other religions. People who answered that they had no religion were 43.3%, and 6.9% of people did not answer the census question.

Of those at least 15 years old, 603 (8.9%) people had a bachelor's or higher degree, 4,017 (59.0%) had a post-high school certificate or diploma, and 2,013 (29.5%) people exclusively held high school qualifications. The median income was $31,900, compared with $41,500 nationally. 285 people (4.2%) earned over $100,000 compared to 12.1% nationally. The employment status of those at least 15 was that 2,964 (43.5%) people were employed full-time, 885 (13.0%) were part-time, and 330 (4.8%) were unemployed.

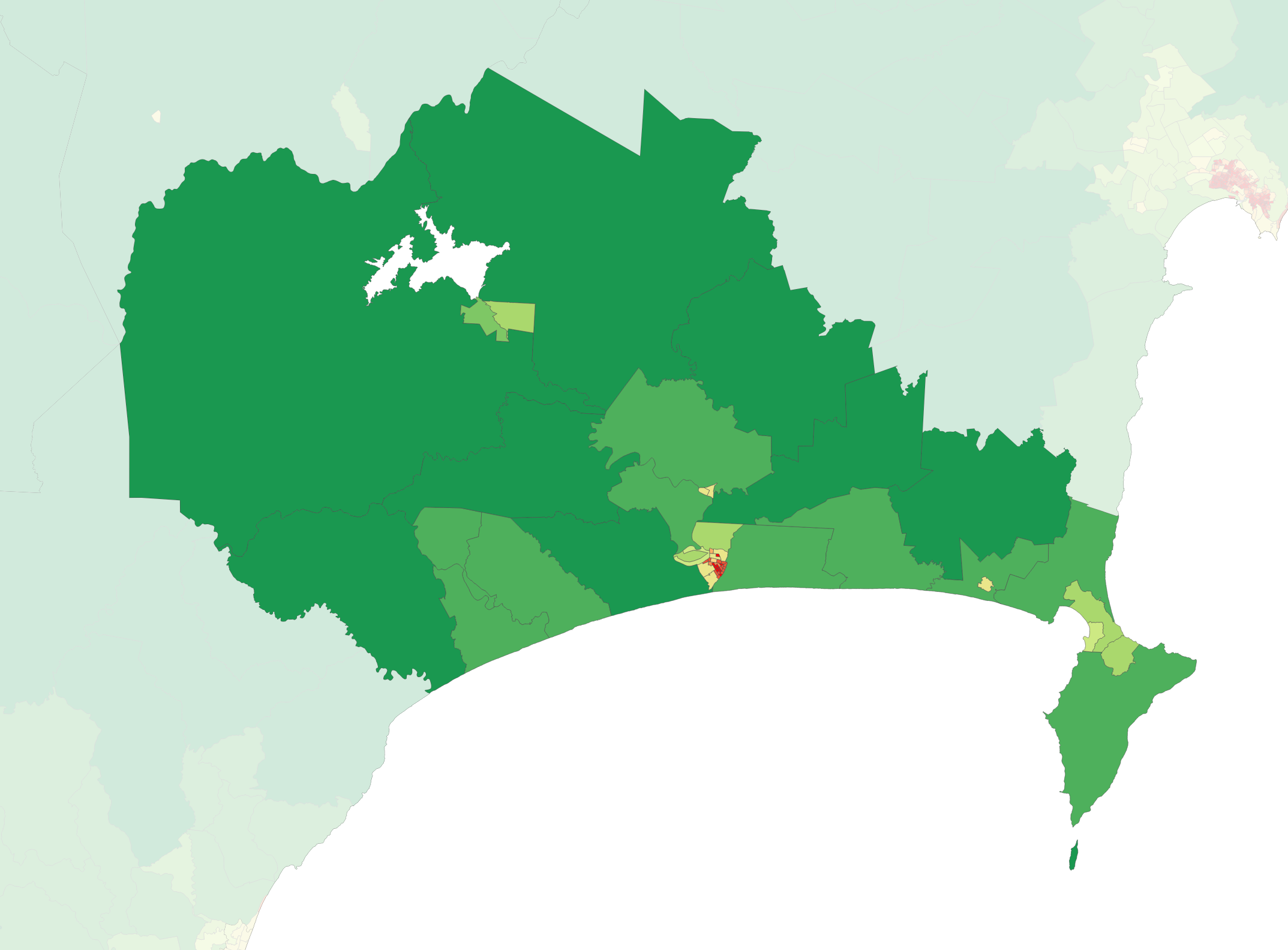
Population density in the 2023 census

Individual statistical areas
Name	Area (km^{2})	Population	Density (per km^{2})	Dwellings	Median age	Median income
Maungataniwha-Raupunga	2,081.73	1,170	0.56	435	36.0 years	$34,900
Frasertown-Ruakituri	1,333.71	879	0.66	318	37.7 years	$34,000
Whakaki	183.47	687	3.74	228	43.4 years	$31,300
Wairoa	7.57	4,707	621.80	1,620	35.1 years	$31,400
Mahia	471.97	1,380	2.92	519	49.7 years	$30,100
New Zealand					38.1 years	$41,500

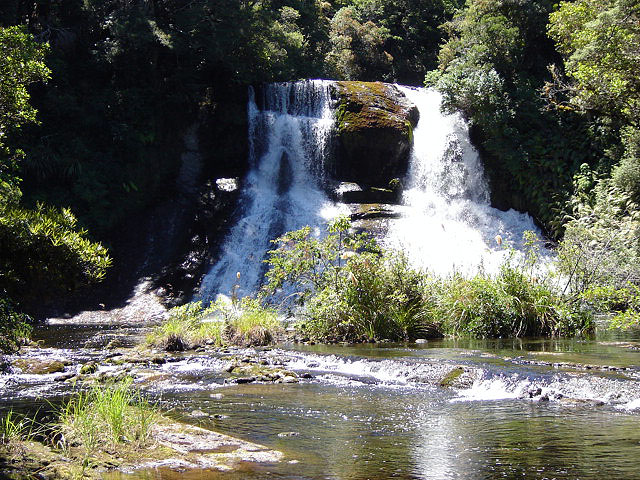
The Āniwaniwa Falls, or Rainbow Falls, are a two-drop waterfall located at northeastern Lake Waikaremoana in New Zealand. This is the 1st Fall.

== Education ==
Wairoa has one mainstream secondary school, Wairoa College, which caters for students between the years of 7 and 13. Te Kura Kaupapa Māori O Ngati Kahungunu O Te Wairoa is a composite school providing for years 1 to 13, teaching in the Māori language

Wairoa Primary, Tiaho, and Frasertown are the primary schools that offer education to students in years 1 to 6. Ohuka, Te Mahia, Nuhaka, Ruakituri, Mohaka, Waikaremoana, Tiniroto, Tutira, Kotemaori, and St Joseph's School offer education to students in the years 1 to 8. The latter is a special Catholic character school.
