= Ngāti Pāhauwera =

Māori iwi (tribe) in New Zealand

- Iwi (tribe) in Māoridom

Ngāti Pāhauwera is a Māori iwi (tribe) of New Zealand.

== See also ==
- List of Māori iwi
