= Wairoa =

Town in Hawke's Bay, New Zealand

- Minor urban area
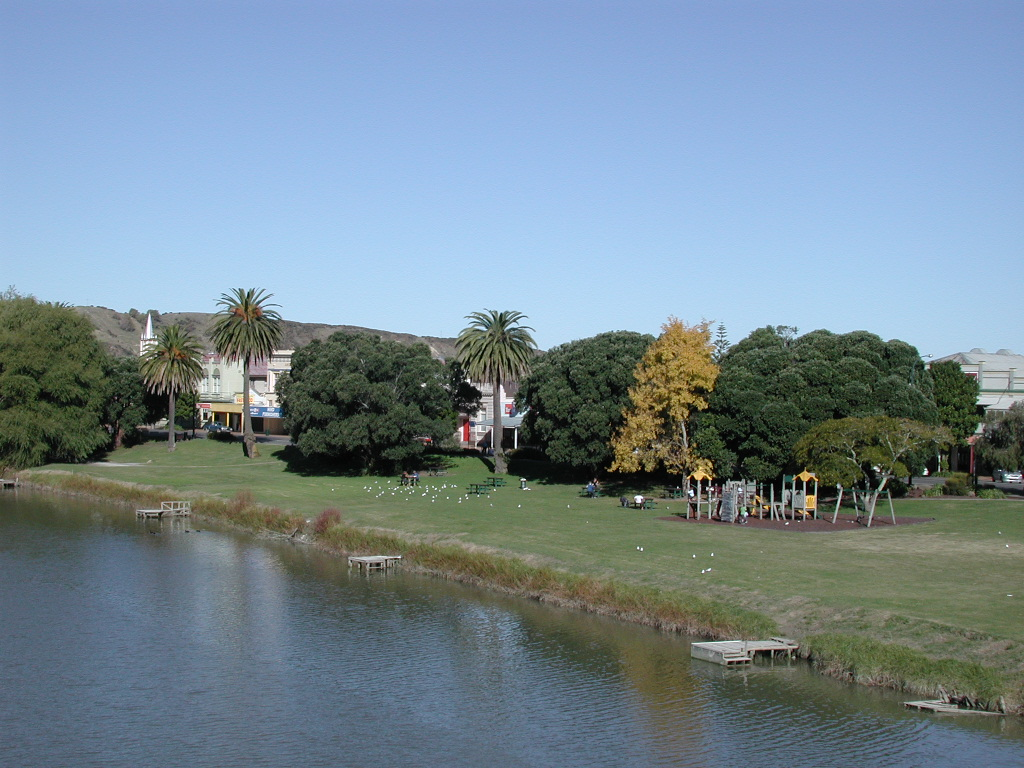
- Riverbank adjacent to town centre, viewed from the bridge over the Wairoa River, 2010
- Interactive map of Wairoa
- Coordinates: 39.035°S 177.418°E
- Country: New Zealand
- Region: Hawke's Bay
- Territorial authority: Wairoa District
- Electorates: Napier; Ikaroa-Rāwhiti (Māori)

Government
  - Territorial authority: Wairoa District Council
  - Mayor of Wairoa: Craig Little
  - Napier MP: Katie Nimon
  - Ikaroa-Rāwhiti MP: Cushla Tangaere-Manuel

Area
  - Total: 7.57 km^{2} (2.92 sq mi)

Population (June 2025)
  - Total: 4,720
  - Density: 624/km^{2} (1,610/sq mi)
- Postcode(s): 4108
- Website: Official website

Wairoa is the largest town in the Wairoa District and the northernmost town in the Hawke's Bay region of New Zealand's North Island. It is located on the northern shore of Hawke Bay at the mouth of the Wairoa River and to the west of Māhia Peninsula. It is 118 kilometres (73 mi) northeast of Napier, and 92 kilometres (57 mi) southwest of Gisborne, on State Highway 2. It is the nearest town to the Te Urewera protected area and former national park, which is accessible from Wairoa via State Highway 38. It is one of three towns in New Zealand where Māori outnumber other ethnicities (the other towns being Kawerau and Ōpōtiki), with 62.29% of the population identifying as Māori.

== History ==
=== Early history ===
Te Wairoa was originally a Māori settlement. The ancestral waka (canoe) Tākitimu travelled up the Wairoa river (full name: Te Wairoa Hōpūpū Hōnengenenge Matangirau) and landed at Mākeakea, near where Tākitimu meeting house stands today. Te Reinga Falls is the starting point of the Wairoa river and said to be linked with the taniwha Hinekorako and Ruamano, who guided Takitimu to Aotearoa. The Wairoa River mouth is associated with two taniwha, Tapuwae and Te Maaha, who are engaged in an ongoing struggle. There were a number of pā in close vicinity to the river, and the river was a major route for transport and trading. The river was an important source of food and still is to this day, including whitebait, flounder, mullet and eel.

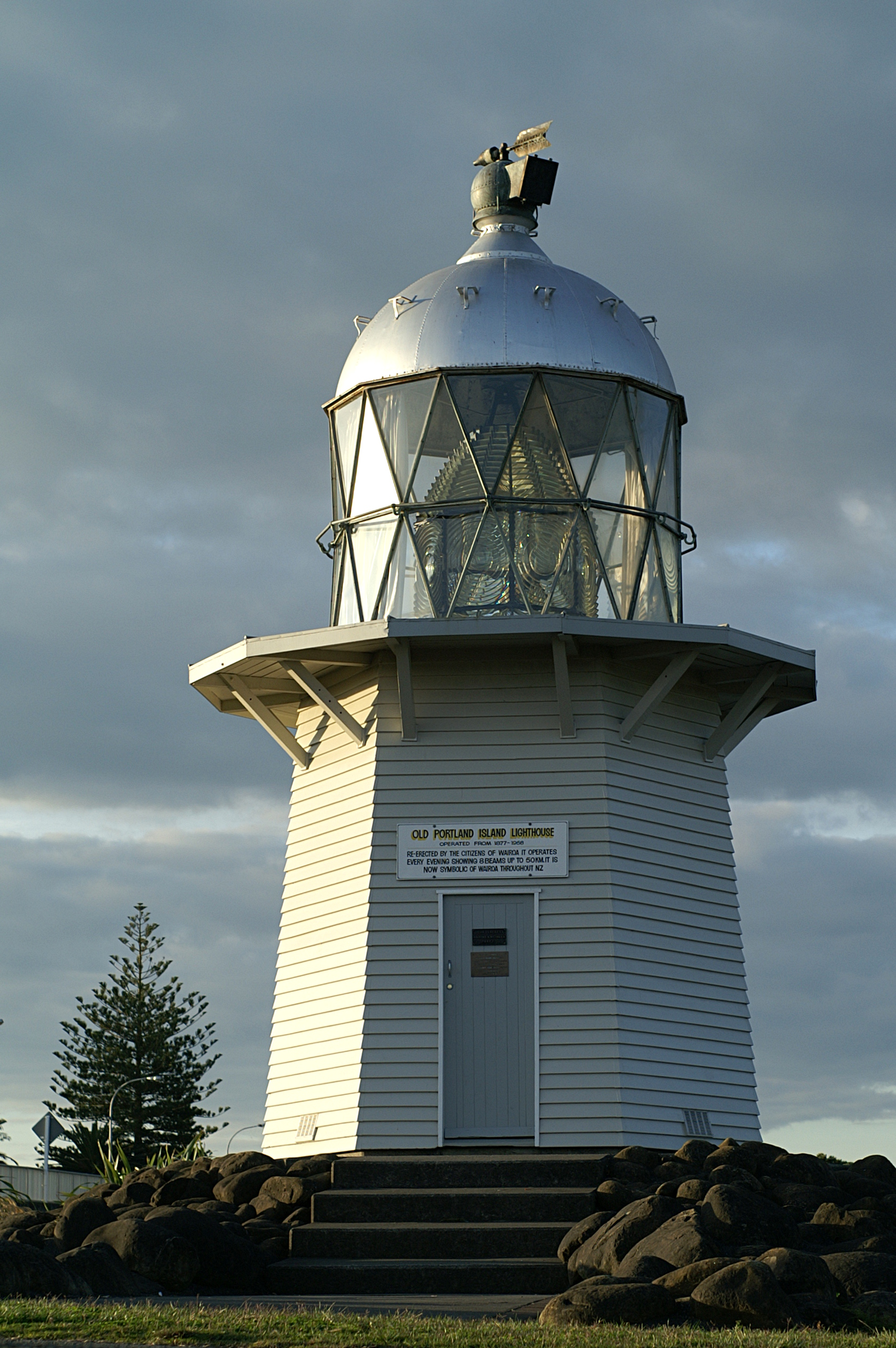
Wairoa Lighthouse

Early European settlement in the area included a whaling station and trading post established by William Rhodes in 1839, dealing largely in flax. These establishments offered sufficient income and attraction. Wairoa's initial name was Clyde, but this was changed, largely to avoid confusion with Clive near Napier and Clyde in the South Island. The north part of the town is called North Clyde. The town rose to prominence during the New Zealand Wars, during which time it was a garrison town.

The New Zealand government bought the land on which the town is built in 1864. This land was divided up and then sold as sections in 1866. The Wairoa Harbour Board was established in 1872. The Wairoa lighthouse was built between 1877 and 1878 and its beacon was first lit in 1878. The tower was reinforced in 1879 to provide greater stability after a storm damaged it. The first bridge across the Wairoa river was built in 1888.

=== 20th century ===
The Wairoa Borough Council was established in 1909. The Napier to Wairoa railway line was started in 1911. Progress was intermittent with the Wairoa river railway bridge being built in 1930. The railway line was completed in 1937. In April 1938, flooding hit the area, causing hundreds of slips which damaged the railway line. Work to restore the railway took place and it was opened again for trains by the end of 1938 and fully utilised by 1939. This led to a decline in the use of the port at Wairoa, with the port used for the last time in 1942. The Wairoa Harbour Board was abolished in 1946. The road bridge across the Wairoa river was damaged in the 1931 Hawke's Bay earthquake and a replacement bridge was completed in 1933.

Annie and Rosamond Smyth were murdered in their home in the Salvation Army hall in 1942. The killer was not identified at the time. Herbert Brunton was murdered in 1948, and this also went unsolved. Leo Silvester Hannan made a death bed confession to the three killings in 1962 while in prison for a 1950 murder in Wellington.

In early March 1988, much of the North Island was severely affected by storm damage from Cyclone Bola. In Wairoa, three days of heavy rain in the catchment areas caused severe flooding and damage including the loss of a 60-metre section of town's main bridge, cutting the town in half, and interrupting phone lines and the town's water supply. There was severe flood damage to farms, businesses, homes and the showgrounds. A new bridge, the third at the location, was completed and officially opened by Queen Elizabeth II in 1990.

In 1990 Wairoa won the last New Zealand Top Town Final in the original Top Town series and were the reigning champs until the series started again in 2009. Due to some confusion with a claim by Greymouth to be the last champions, Wairoa was not eligible for the new top town series and unable to defend their title.

=== Gang conflict ===
There have long been tensions between the rival Mongrel Mob and Black Power gangs in Wairoa. In 1988, Wairoa's main street: Marine Parade was the scene of a fatal shooting of two Black Power associates. In 2003, a Mongrel Mob member was killed in February and a sniper shot a Black Power gang member dead in a van following an incident near the Wairoa Courthouse in November. In 2010, a Black Power gang member was shot in the face. Two Black Power members retaliated later that year and shot a Mongrel Mob member several times at a Wairoa petrol station. In 2021, gang related violence flared again with five separate incidents of guns being fired at homes in Wairoa. The police launched Operation Atlas to reduce tensions and stop the ongoing violence in Wairoa. In 2022, a shotgun blast hit the window of a child's bedroom (though the child was not present in the room) and a person received serious leg injuries. This was due to gang-crossfire where two homes were shot at in a drive-by shooting.

=== 21st century ===
In 2017, Rocket Lab built their rocket launch site on the Mahia Peninsula with Wairoa being the closet town to the site (83 kilometres away). This has led to a number of employment opportunities for Wairoa.

The Wairoa branch of the ANZ bank closed in 2018, and the BNZ and Westpac banks closed in 2021. Wairoa also lost its only dentist in 2020 forcing locals to visit Gisborne or Napier for dental treatment.

In February 2023, Wairoa was hit by Cyclone Gabrielle with it being described as "the most catastrophic weather event Wairoa has experienced in living memory". State Highway 2 between Napier and Wairoa was closed until May 2023 because of the damage it suffered. in May 2023, plans were progressing to prevent flooding affecting Wairoa again with the Hawke's Bay Regional Council saying that they wish to invest in a flood protection scheme. The risk of flooding "in some areas as high as 5 percent. This means, for example, that a dwelling designed for a 50-year life has a 93 percent chance of being flooded in its lifetime." It was noted by the mayor Craig Little, "There is actually zero flood protection at the moment" for Wairoa.

In late June 2024, Wairoa experienced torrential rain and high tides, which led to 118 homes being flooded. The flooding was compounded by a blockage at the mouth of the Wairoa River, which caused the river to burst its banks and significant flooding three blocks inland. In response to flooding, the New Zealand Government allocated NZ$3 million to disaster relief efforts in Wairoa. Following the Wairoa flooding, both the Hawke's Bay Regional Council and the Government commissioned investigations into local flood mitigation efforts.

== Demographics ==
Stats NZ describes Wairoa as a small urban area, which covers 7.57 km^{2} (2.92 sq mi). It had an estimated population of 4,720 as of June 2025, with a population density of 624 people per km^{2}.

Historical population
Year	Pop.	±% p.a.
2006	4,314	—
2013	4,089	−0.76%
2018	4,527	+2.06%
2023	4,707	+0.78%

Wairoa had a population of 4,707 in the 2023 New Zealand census, an increase of 180 people (4.0%) since the 2018 census, and an increase of 618 people (15.1%) since the 2013 census. There were 2,304 males, 2,394 females, and 9 people of other genders in 1,620 dwellings. 2.1% of people identified as LGBTIQ+. The median age was 35.1 years (compared with 38.1 years nationally). There were 1,173 people (24.9%) aged under 15 years, 870 (18.5%) aged 15 to 29, 1,869 (39.7%) aged 30 to 64, and 795 (16.9%) aged 65 or older.

People could identify as more than one ethnicity. The results were 41.5% European (Pākehā); 74.6% Māori; 4.8% Pasifika; 2.5% Asian; 0.2% Middle Eastern, Latin American and African New Zealanders (MELAA); and 1.3% other, which includes people giving their ethnicity as "New Zealander". English was spoken by 96.0%, Māori by 22.2%, Samoan by 0.3%, and other languages by 2.7%. No language could be spoken by 2.5% (e.g. too young to talk). New Zealand Sign Language was known by 0.8%. The percentage of people born overseas was 7.3, compared with 28.8% nationally.

Religious affiliations were 35.4% Christian, 0.3% Hindu, 0.6% Islam, 15.6% Māori religious beliefs, 0.2% Buddhist, 0.3% New Age, 0.1% Jewish, and 0.6% other religions. People who answered that they had no religion were 40.5%, and 7.3% of people did not answer the census question.

Of those at least 15 years old, 345 (9.8%) people had a bachelor's or higher degree, 2,049 (58.0%) had a post-high school certificate or diploma, and 1,140 (32.3%) people exclusively held high school qualifications. The median income was $31,400, compared with $41,500 nationally. 117 people (3.3%) earned over $100,000 compared to 12.1% nationally. The employment status of those at least 15 was 1,476 (41.8%) full-time, 414 (11.7%) part-time, and 174 (4.9%) unemployed.

Wairoa had a population of 3348 people in 1951, which increased to 3796 people in 1956 and; 4301 in 1961.

== Climate ==
Climate data for Wairoa (1991–2020 normals, extremes 1950–present)
Month	Jan	Feb	Mar	Apr	May	Jun	Jul	Aug	Sep	Oct	Nov	Dec	Year
Record high °C (°F)	38.0 (100.4)	37.3 (99.1)	33.0 (91.4)	30.6 (87.1)	26.7 (80.1)	24.7 (76.5)	23.3 (73.9)	24.3 (75.7)	29.6 (85.3)	31.2 (88.2)	34.1 (93.4)	34.5 (94.1)	38.0 (100.4)
Mean maximum °C (°F)	32.2 (90.0)	31.3 (88.3)	28.9 (84.0)	25.8 (78.4)	23.3 (73.9)	20.0 (68.0)	19.0 (66.2)	19.9 (67.8)	22.8 (73.0)	25.7 (78.3)	27.9 (82.2)	29.6 (85.3)	33.1 (91.6)
Mean daily maximum °C (°F)	25.1 (77.2)	24.5 (76.1)	22.6 (72.7)	19.9 (67.8)	17.7 (63.9)	15.2 (59.4)	14.2 (57.6)	15.1 (59.2)	17.1 (62.8)	19.4 (66.9)	21.2 (70.2)	23.4 (74.1)	19.6 (67.3)
Daily mean °C (°F)	19.4 (66.9)	19.3 (66.7)	17.4 (63.3)	14.9 (58.8)	12.5 (54.5)	10.2 (50.4)	9.5 (49.1)	10.2 (50.4)	12.0 (53.6)	14.0 (57.2)	15.8 (60.4)	18.2 (64.8)	14.5 (58.0)
Mean daily minimum °C (°F)	13.8 (56.8)	14.0 (57.2)	12.2 (54.0)	9.9 (49.8)	7.4 (45.3)	5.2 (41.4)	4.8 (40.6)	5.2 (41.4)	6.8 (44.2)	8.6 (47.5)	10.5 (50.9)	12.9 (55.2)	9.3 (48.7)
Mean minimum °C (°F)	7.9 (46.2)	8.4 (47.1)	7.0 (44.6)	4.3 (39.7)	1.8 (35.2)	0.2 (32.4)	0.0 (32.0)	0.4 (32.7)	1.5 (34.7)	2.9 (37.2)	4.6 (40.3)	7.2 (45.0)	−0.4 (31.3)
Record low °C (°F)	4.7 (40.5)	4.5 (40.1)	3.5 (38.3)	0.6 (33.1)	−0.9 (30.4)	−2.5 (27.5)	−2.3 (27.9)	−1.6 (29.1)	−0.8 (30.6)	0.1 (32.2)	−0.2 (31.6)	3.1 (37.6)	−2.5 (27.5)
Average rainfall mm (inches)	87.3 (3.44)	87.7 (3.45)	102.6 (4.04)	130.7 (5.15)	98.5 (3.88)	124.5 (4.90)	123.2 (4.85)	92.1 (3.63)	87.9 (3.46)	93.1 (3.67)	80.7 (3.18)	77.1 (3.04)	1,185.4 (46.69)
Source: NIWA

== Economy ==
The meat processing plant in Wairoa was first established in 1916. Originally owned by the Wairoa Co-operative Meat Company, the building was destroyed by a fire on 5 February 1931. The AFFCO group bought it in 1990. The meat processing plant employs around 650 people in their peak season. They process mutton, lamb, goat and beef and export much of the product. There is also a rendering plant onsite producing bone meal and tallow. In 2015 the Employment Court deemed a lockout of 170 workers at the plant illegal. Management had locked workers out for five months who refused to sign individual contracts. In 2018, the Court of Appeal ruled that those workers locked out should be paid lost wages. In February 2020, a worker at the plant was killed on the job, crushed by pallets. Worksafe closed the plant briefly and investigated the incident.

Forestry is playing an increasing role in the economy of Wairoa. Many farms are being converted to forests which earn carbon credits. There are concerns that the loss of farming will shrink the size of the town's economy and lead to depopulation.

In January 2020, the Government announced funding of $6.1 million to support rebuilding in the central business district. The funding will support a Wairoa Integrated Business and Tourism Facility, a Wairoa Digital Employment Programme and a Wairoa Regional Digital Hub.

== Amenities and events ==
Since 2005, Wairoa has been host to the annual Wairoa Māori Film Festival, New Zealand's premiere Māori and indigenous film festival, which has hosted film makers from across the nation and around the world. In 2015, the festival began to be hosted in part at the newly revitalised Gaiety Cinema and Theatre, which had recently been fitted out with one of the world's most advanced theatre sound systems.

The Wairoa Agricultural & Pastoral Society was established in 1899 and held its first show next to the Frasertown Domain. A variety of events are run at the annual show including rodeo, dog trials, competition sheep shearing, show jumping and other equestrian events. The 2022 edition, due to be held in January was cancelled due to COVID-19 restrictions.

The Wairoa museum, located at 142 Marine Parade, is housed since 2001, in what was the ANZ bank building. The collection focusses on local and Māori history and includes a Māori flag from the Māori land wars in 1865. In 2016, the museum expanded its exhibition space and refurbished the galleries and developed a new interactive "discovery space".

The Wairoa Centennial Library was built in 1960. It was designed by the Wellington Architectural firm Porker & Martin. The Wairoa Rotary Club raised $20,000 to build an extension to the library in 1974 to house a museum. Further work to the library was completed in 1988 and 2003. The library is located at 212 Marine Parade.

Wairoa is home to two golf courses. The Wairoa Golf Club is located 5 kilometres to the north of central Wairoa. The Mahia Golf Club is located on the Mahia Peninsula and has a nine-hole course.

The Wairoa community centre is home to an indoor stadium. Indoor soccer, netball, cricket, badminton, volleyball and basketball can be played. There is also a gym and a 25-metre indoor swimming pool. It is located at 33 Marine Parade.

== Marae ==
The township includes a number of marae (meeting grounds) and wharenui (meeting houses) for the local iwi (tribe) of Ngāti Kahungunu and its hapū (sub-tribes).

Marae	Wharenui	Affiliated hapū
Hinemihi	Te Poho o Hinemihi	Ngāti Hinemihi
Hurumua	Hurumua Memorial Hall	Ngāi Tānemitirangi
Iwitea	Te Poho o Tahu	Mātawhaiti
Kihitu	Te Rauhina	Ngāti Kahu
Ruataniwha	Te Poho o Riria	Ngāi Te Kapuamātotoru
Taihoa	Te Otane	Ngāti Kurupakiaka and Te Kāwiti
Tākitimu-Waihirere	Tākitimu Wharenui	Ngāi Te Apatu and Ngāti Moewhare
Tawhiti A Maru	St Therese's Church	Catholic church
Te Mira, Whetū Mārama and Mill Pā	Mākoro	Ngāti Mākoro
Whaakirangi	Whaakirangi	Ngāti Mātangirau
Arimawha	Te Poho o Hinetu, Ko Amiria	Ngāti Hinetu
Rangiāhua	Te Poho o Tama te Rangi	Ngai Tama Te Rangi
Pākōwhai	Te Huinga o te Aroha	Ngāti Mihi

In October 2020, the Government committed $1,949,075 from the Provincial Growth Fund to upgrade Ruataniwha, Hinemihi, Hurumua, Iwitea, Kihitu, Taihoa, Tākitimu-Waihirere, Tawhiti A Maru, Te Mira and Whakakī, and 14 other Ngāti Kahungunu marae.

== Infrastructure ==
=== The three waters ===
In 2020, the Wairoa District Council applied to the Regional Council for resource consents for the Wairoa town wastewater scheme. Wastewater is discharged to an estuary in the lower reaches of the Wairoa River, through an outfall about 100 metres from the shore. A panel of independent commissioners reviewing the application noted that the discharge to water is not culturally acceptable to the community, but that land-based discharge is currently unaffordable and the council has not secured suitable land. The review concluded that the town "had a very significant problem" and urged the council to get help from central government.

During 2021, the Government consulted with regional and district councils about proposed major reforms for the three waters sector nationwide, involving the proposed transfer of assets from 67 local authorities to four new large entities. The mayor of Wairoa, Craig Little criticised the proposed reforms and expressed concerns about the loss of local representation and control.

=== Hospital ===
Wairoa Hospital (Te Hauora o te Wairoa / Wairoa Health) is a 12-bed hospital that provides both maternity and acute medical inpatient beds. It is run by the Hawke's Bay District Health Board. Also located at Te Hauora o te Wairoa / Wairoa Health is a general practice, an emergency department (level 2), radiology and laboratory services, mental health and addiction services and a number of outpatient clinics. it is located at 36 Kitchener Street, Wairoa.

=== Transport ===
The Wairoa airport is located on Airport Road on the northern side of Wairoa. The runway is 914 metres long. The airport is home to the Wairoa Aero Club.

Wairoa is connected south west to Napier and north east to Gisborne by State Highway 2. Connecting Wairoa to the northwest is State Highway 38 which travels past Lake Waikaremoana where it joins State Highway 5.

The Napier to Gisborne section of the Palmerston North-Gisborne railway line was mothballed in 2012 after being damaged by a storm. It was repaired and reopened between Napier and Wairoa in January 2020 with funding of $6.2 million from the Provincial Growth Fund. Freight services ran to transport logs to Napier Port. The service was suspended after six return trips as a result of the impact of COVID-19 on the forestry sector. It reopened in November 2020.

== Notable buildings ==
St Andrew's Church (Presbyterian-Methodist) is located at 98 Queen Street. It is a category two historic place. it was most likely built between 1932 and 1935.

St Peter's Catholic Church is located at 64 Queen Street. It is a category two historic place. One of the oldest buildings in Wairoa, it was completed in 1882. Built out of timber, it is an important example of New Zealand Gothic Revival church architecture.

The Wairoa Meat Company building, located on Marine Parade, is a category two Historic Place. Built between 1915 and 1920, highlights the long association between Wairoa and the meat processing industry. It survived the 1931 Napier earthquake and in 2020 received a $200,000 grant for seismic strengthening.

The Wairoa County Chambers, located on Queen Street, is a category two Historic Place.

The Gaiety Cinema and Theatre, located at 252 Marine Parade was built in 1925. It was destroyed in the 1931 Hawkes Bay earthquake. It was subsequently rebuilt in 1932 in an Art Deco style. It has hosted many events including screenings of movies, concerts, political rallies and boxing matches. It closed in 1960 and was used for a variety of purposes including as a supermarket and basketball court. In 1998, work was completed to restore it to its former use as a cinema and theatre and it was reopened in 2000. Finances forced it to close in 2009. It reopened in 2015 with support from the Wairoa District Council. It has a capacity of 250 patrons.

Notable buildings

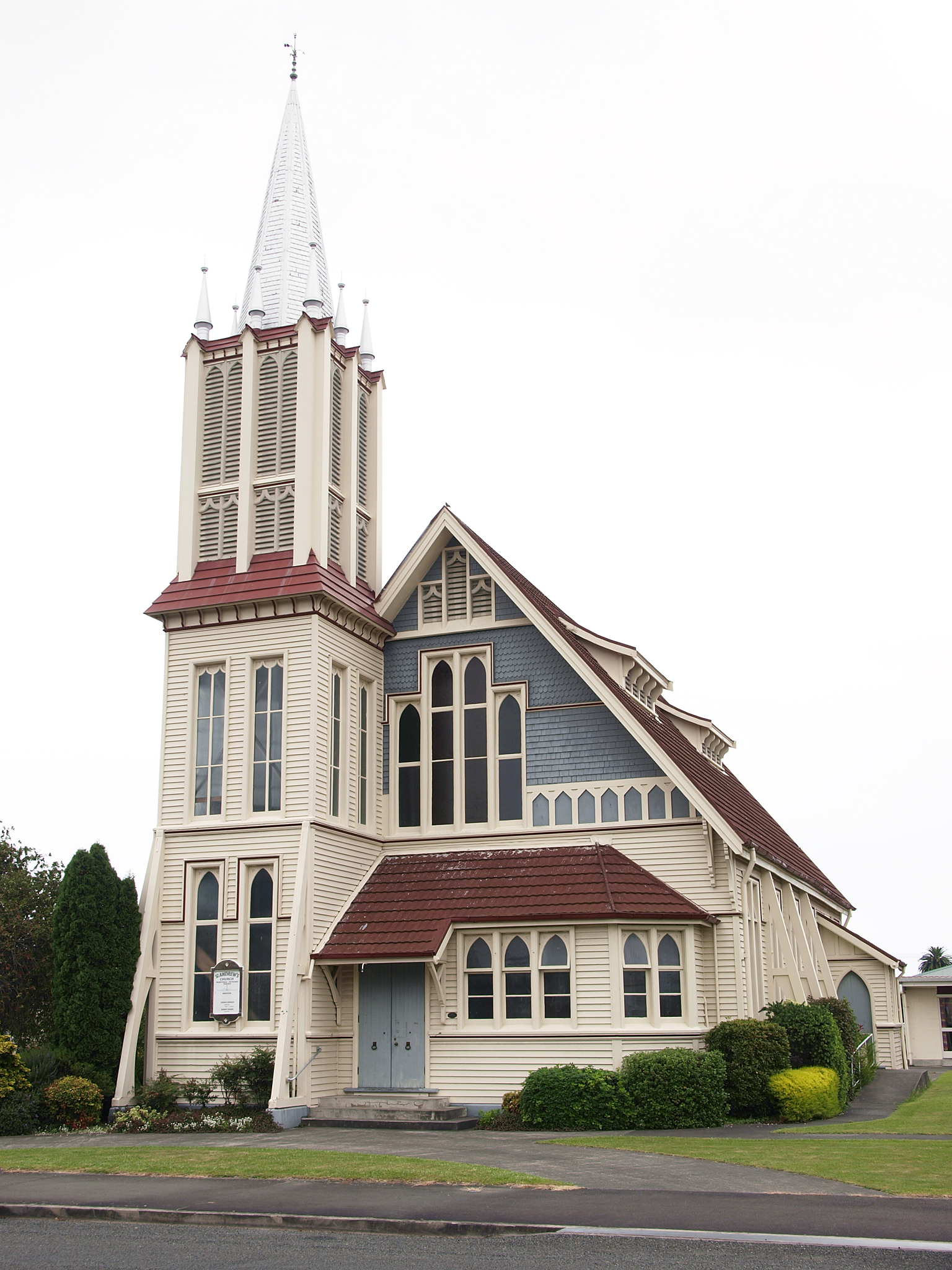
St Andrew's Church

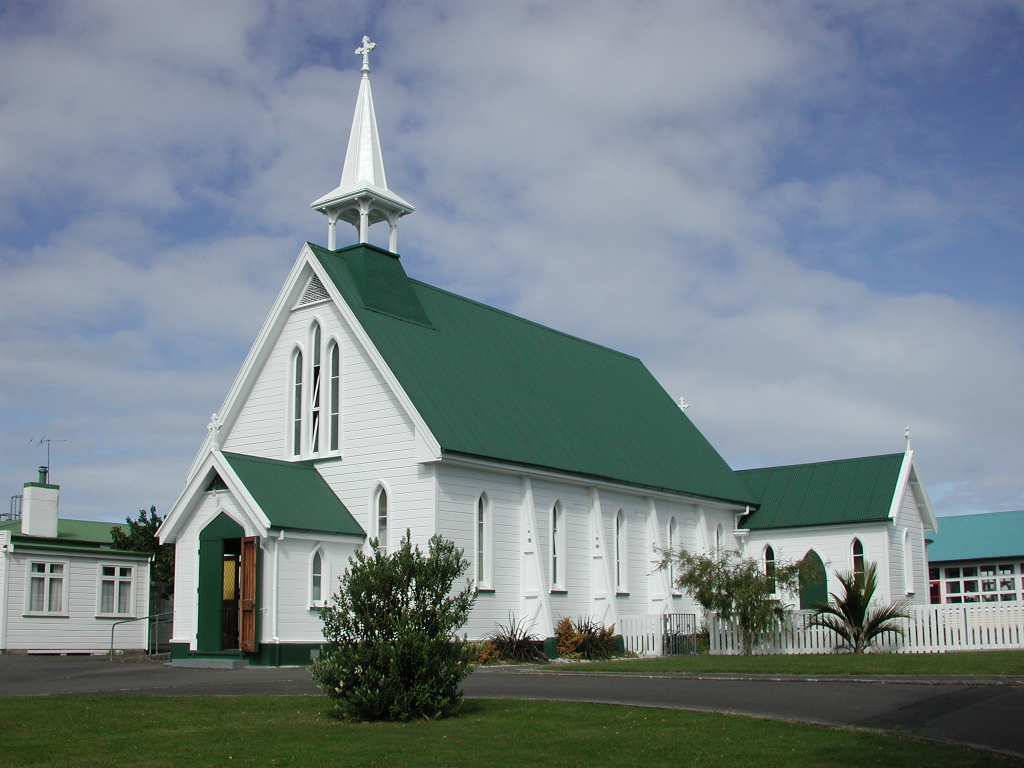
St Peter's Church

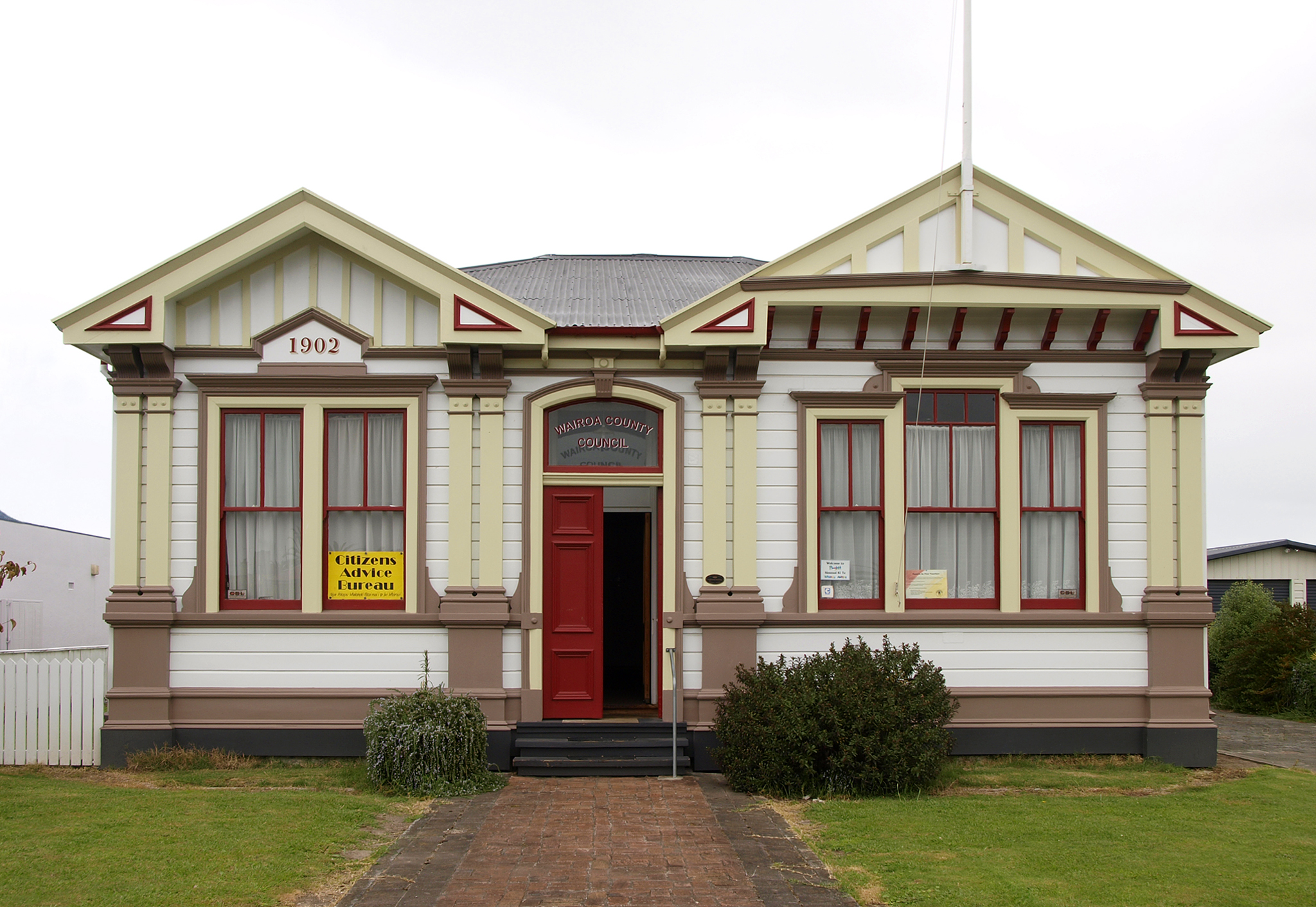
Wairoa County Chambers (1902)

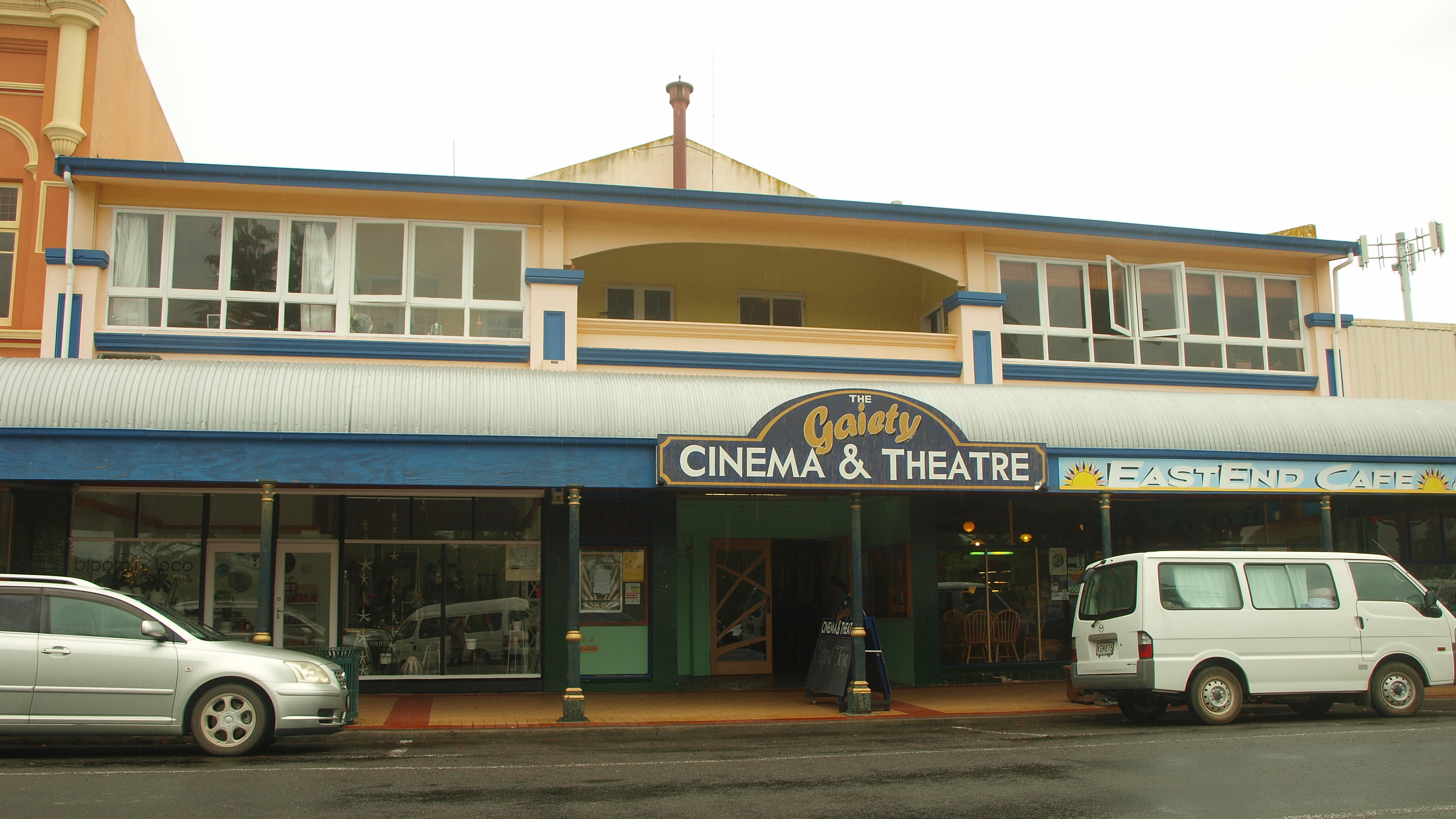
Gaiety Cinema and Theatre

== Education ==
Wairoa College is a Year 7–13 state high school. It is a decile 1 school with a roll of 360. It opened on the present site in 1910 as Wairoa District High School, and became Wairoa College in 1954. It included years 7 and 8 in 2005.

Wairoa Primary School is a Year 1–6 state primary school. It is a decile 2 school with a roll of 274. It opened on the current site in 1956. Before this, primary education was provided by the District High School. North Clyde School, established c. 1931, merged to Wairoa Primary School at the end of 2004.

Tiaho Primary School is a Year 1–6 state primary school. It is a decile 2 school with a roll of 88. The school was formed in 2005 by the merger of Hillneath and Turiroa schools on the Hillneath site. Wairoa Intermediate School had merged with Hillneath in 1997.

TKKM o Ngati Kahungunu o Te Wairoa is a Year 1–13 Māori immersion school. It is a decile 1 school with a roll of 191. It opened in 1997.

St Joseph's School is a Year 1–8 is a state integrated Catholic primary school. It is a decile 3 school with a roll of 98. It opened in 1911.

All these schools are co-educational. Rolls are as of July 2026.

== Notable people ==
- Ethan Browne, actor
- Bronwyn Elsmore, writer and religious studies lecturer
- Derek Fox, broadcaster and former mayor of Wairoa
- Pana Hema Taylor, actor
- Katarina Kawana, musician
- Esme Tombleson, politician
- Mere Whaanga, author and historian
