= Wairoa District Council =

Territorial authority in New Zealand

Coordinates: 39.0348982°S 177.418452°E

Wairoa District Council Te Kaunihera o Te Wairoa
- Territorial authority
- Council logo

- Council ward map

Type
- Type: Unicameral

History
- Founded: 6 March 1989, 37 years ago
- Preceded by: Wairoa Borough Council

Leadership
- Mayor: Craig Little
- Deputy mayor: Benita Cairns
- Interim CEO: Malcolm Alexander

Structure
- Seats: 7 seats (1 mayor, 6 ward seats)
- Political groups: Independent (7)
- Length of term: 3 years, renewable

Elections
- Voting system: First-past-the-post
- Last election: 11 October 2025
- Next election: 2028

Website
- wairoadc.govt.nz

Wairoa District Council (Māori: Te Kaunihera o Te Wairoa) is the territorial authority for the Wairoa District of New Zealand.

The council covers the town of Wairoa and the surrounding rural communities. The council is the successor of the Wairoa Borough Council.

The council is led by the mayor of Wairoa, who is currently Craig Little.

== Composition ==
Wairoa District Council is made up of one mayor and six councillors.

Current council
Ward	Councillor	Affiliation	First elected
Mayor	Craig Little	None	
General	Sarah Bird	None	
General	Jeremy Harker	Independent	
General	Roz Thomas	None	
Māori	Benita Cairns	None	
Māori	Michelle Tahuri	None	
Māori	Trevor Teotaia Hirini Waikawa	None	
