= Mayor of Wairoa =

New Zealand mayor

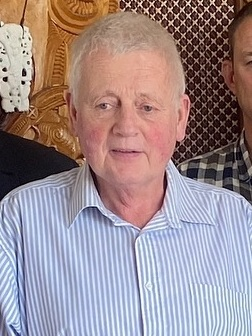
- Incumbent; Craig Little since 2013
- Style: His/Her Worship
- Term length: Three years, renewable
- Inaugural holder: John Somerville
- Formation: 1909
- Deputy: Benita Cairns
- Salary: $116,979
- Website: Official website

The mayor of Wairoa officiates over the Wairoa District Council.

Craig Little is the current mayor of Wairoa. He has held the position since 2013.

== List of mayors ==
^{†} Died in office

	Name	Portrait	Term of office
1	John Somerville		1909–1910
2	Joseph Corkill		1910–1917
3	John Mayo		1917–1919
4	Joseph Corkill		1919–1929
5	Robert T. Esther		1929–1931
6	Harry Harker		1931–1943
7	M. J. Gemmell		1943–1944
8	Clarence V. Chamberlain		1944–1953
9	Jack Livingstone		1953–1959
10	Robert Shortt		1959–1971^{[†]}
11	J. S. Standring		fl.1971–1980
	Michael Barrett		fl.1983–1984
	Cliff Owen		fl.1986–1991
	Derek Fox		1995–2001
	Les Probert		2001–2013
	Craig Little		2013–present

== List of deputy mayors ==
Name	Term	Mayor
John Hunter Brown	fl.1912	Corkill
Unknown	c. 1912–c. 1919	–
John McDonald	fl.1919–1925	Corkill
J. R. Gillespie	fl.1925–1928	Corkill
J. Ross	fl.1929–1930	Esther
Unknown	c. 1930–c. 1933	–
Don Glengarry	fl.1933–1934	Harker
M. J. Gemmell	1934–1943	Harker
William Henry Flint	1943–1944	Gemmell
M. J. Gemmell	1944–1947	Chamberlain
William Henry Flint	fl.1947–1949	Chamberlain
Unknown	c. 1949–c. 1960	–
John Gardiner Woolf	fl.1960	Shortt
Unknown	c. 1960–c. 1988	–
K. McEwen	fl.1988	Owen
Unknown	c. 1988–1998	–
Les Probert	1998–2001	Fox
Unknown	2001–c. 2003	Probert
Judy Harrison	fl.2003–2004	Probert
Denise Eaglesome-Karekare	fl.2005–2019	Probert
Hine Flood	2019–2022	Little
Denise Eaglesome-Karekare	2022–2025	Little
Benita Cairns	2025–present	Little
