= List of Electron launches =

Launches of Rocket Lab launch vehicle

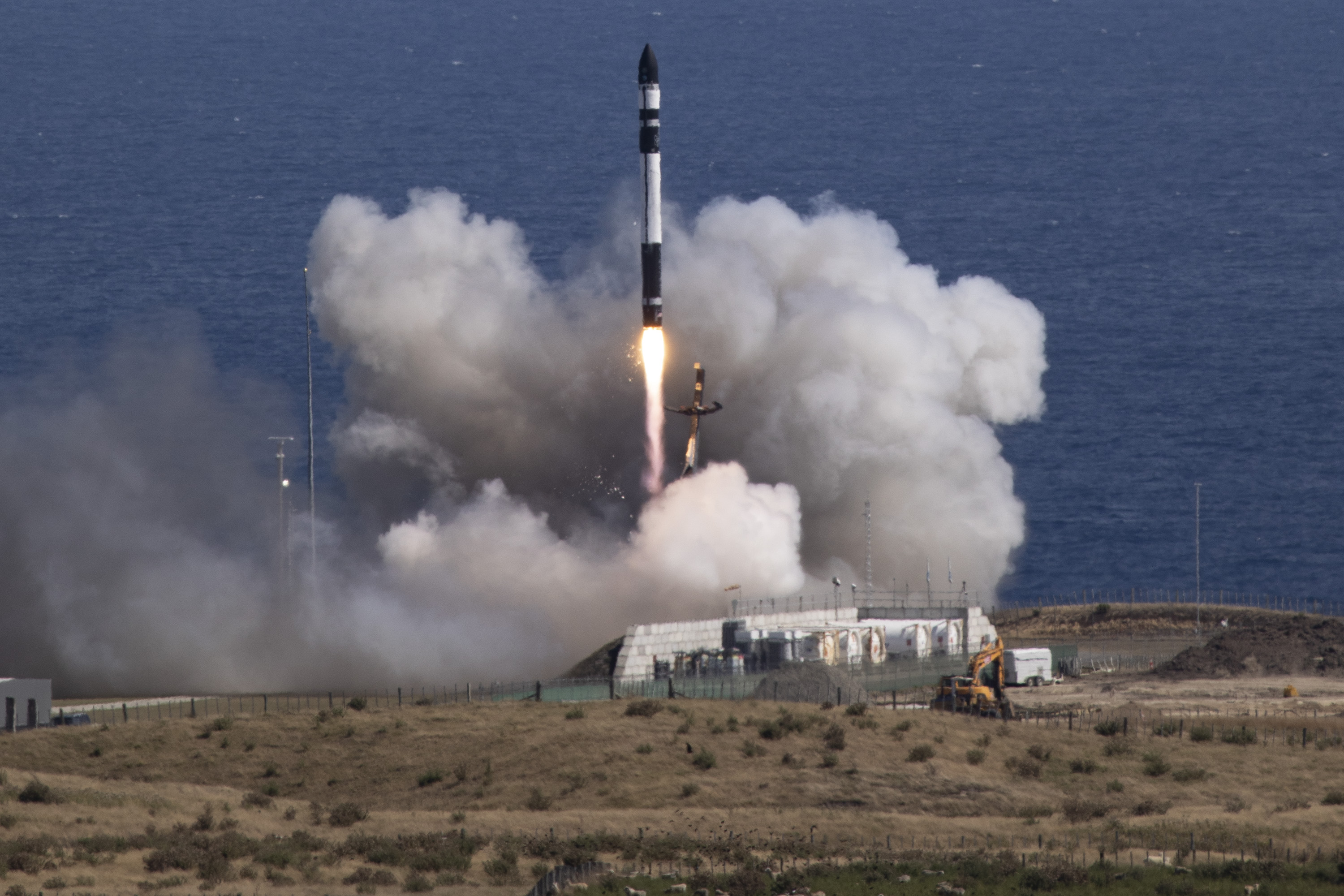
Launch of Electron in start of the "Birds of a Feather" mission.

Electron is a two-stage small-lift launch vehicle built and operated by Rocket Lab. The rocket has been launched to orbit 92 times with 88 successes and four failures. A suborbital version of the rocket, HASTE, has been successfully launched nine times.

The first flight, known as "It's a Test", launched on 25 May 2017. The mission failed due to a glitch in communication equipment on the ground. Successful follow-on missions, including "Still Testing", "It's Business Time" and "This One's For Pickering", delivered multiple small payloads to low Earth orbit. Flight 26 was the first Electron flight to attempt a full catch recovery using a mid-air helicopter catch. "Scout's Arrow" was the first suborbital launch of the rocket.

In July 2019, Rocket Lab expected to have launches every two weeks in 2020. In June 2020, with a new Electron launch vehicle built every 18 days, Rocket Lab was planning to deliver monthly launches for the remainder of 2020 and into 2021, including the company's first launch from Wallops LC-2 in 2023 and a mission to the Moon for NASA aboard Electron and Rocket Lab's spacecraft bus platform Photon in 2022.

== Launch statistics ==
=== Launch outcomes ===
- Orbital Failure
- Orbital Success
- Sub-orbital Failure
- Sub-orbital Success
- Scheduled Orbital Missions
- Scheduled Sub-Orbital Missions

=== Launch sites ===
- Mahia LC-1A
- Mahia LC-1B
- MARS LC-2

=== Booster tests and recoveries ===
- No Attempt
- Atmospheric Test Success
- Ocean Recovery Success
- Aerial Capture Partial Failure

=== Rocket configurations ===
- Block 1
- Block upgrade (Recovery Hardware)
- HASTE (Sub-Orbital)

== Orbital launches ==
=== 2017–2018 ===
Electron launched for the first time in May 2017, but the rocket was destroyed by the range safety officer after a telemetry loss, which was later attributed to a ground software failure. Electron experienced its first successful launch in January 2018, and launched their first mission for NASA in December 2018.

Flight No.	Name	Date/time (UTC)	Launch site	Payload	Payload mass	Destination	Customer(s)	Launch outcome	Booster recovery
1	"It's a Test"	25 May 2017, 04:20	Mahia, LC-1A	None	None	500 km, 85° LEO	Rocket Lab (flight test)	Failure	No attempt
1	The rocket successfully launched and performed first stage separation and fairing separation. After reaching an altitude of about 224 kilometres (139 mi) (planned 500 kilometres (310 mi) at 85° inclination), the telemetry feed to the range safety officer was lost and the rocket was destroyed by range safety officer. Post-flight analysis determined the issue to be a simple ground software failure rather than a problem with the rocket. The ground software issue was found to be a contractor's failure to enable forward error correction on their hardware leading to data corruption. Rocket Lab made no changes to the Electron vehicle and instead implemented adjustment to procedures to prevent similar problems.								
2	"Still Testing"	21 January 2018, 01:43	Mahia, LC-1A	Dove Pioneer; Lemur-2 × 2; Humanity Star	13 kg (29 lb)	400 km, 82.9° LEO	Planet Labs; Spire Global	Success	No attempt
2	Carrying CubeSats for Planet Labs and Spire Global. The two Lemur-2 satellites were put into a circularized orbit by the new "Electron kick stage" which was not announced until after the launch. Between December 2017 and January 2018 the launch was delayed six times due to weather, orbital traffic, rocket, and range safety issues. Put Lemur-2 payloads into 500 km (310 mi) high orbit at 85.0° inclination while the Dove Pioneer satellite was put into a 289 km (180 mi) x 533 km (331 mi).								
3	"It's Business Time"	11 November 2018, 03:50	Mahia, LC-1A	Lemur-2 × 2; CICERO; IRVINE01; NABEO; Proxima × 2	Approx 45 kilograms (99 lb)	500 km, 85° LEO	Spire Global; GeoOptics; Irvine CubeSat STEM Program; High Performance Space Structure Systems; Fleet Space Technologies	Success	No attempt
3	The 11 November 2018 launch was successful; all cubesats planned to be deployed were deployed in orbit. The launch, originally planned for April 2018, had been delayed several times: to June/July after unusual behavior was identified in a motor controller during a wet dress rehearsal, by a few days after a ground tracking antenna issue in the Chatham Island tracking station and indefinitely after another motor controller issue. In October 2018, a nine-day launch window was announced starting 11 November 2018.								
4	"This One's For Pickering"	16 December 2018, 06:33	Mahia, LC-1A	ELaNa-19; ALBus; CeREs; CHOMPTT; CubeSail; DaVinci; ISX; NMTSat; RSat-P; Shields-1; STF-1; SHFT 2; TOMSat EagleScout; TOMSat R3	78 kg (172 lb)	500 km, 85° LEO	NASA	Success	No attempt
4	Multiple CubeSats for the NASA-sponsored ELaNa-19 mission. They were deployed from RailPOD dispensers. Was the first NASA mission for Rocket Lab.								

=== 2019 ===
Electron launched 6 times, all successfully, in 2019. First launch for the U.S. Air Force in May.

Flight No.	Name	Date/time (UTC)	Launch site	Payload	Payload Mass	Destination	Customer(s)	Launch outcome	Booster recovery
5	"Two Thumbs Up"	28 March 2019, 23:27	Mahia, LC-1A	R3D2	150 kg (330 lb)	425 km, 39.5° LEO	DARPA	Success	No attempt
5	Radio Frequency Risk Reduction Deployment Demonstration (R3D2) will qualify a new type of membrane reflectarray antenna. Northrop Grumman serves as the prime contractor for R3D2. Blue Canyon Technologies provided the satellite bus, MMA Design provided the antenna.								
6	"That's a Funny Looking Cactus"	5 May 2019, 06:00	Mahia, LC-1A	STP-27RD; SPARC-1; Falcon ODE; Harbinger	180 kilograms (400 lb)	500 km, 40° LEO	U.S. Air Force	Success	No attempt
6	Launch is part of the "Rapid Agile Launch Initiative" (RALI) for the U.S. Air Force. Was first night launch of an Electron and its heaviest payload up to the time.								
7	"Make it Rain"	29 June 2019, 04:30	Mahia, LC-1A	BlackSky Global 3; Prometheus x 2; ACRUX-1; SpaceBEE 8 and 9; Painani 1	80 kilograms (180 lb)	450 km, 45° LEO	BlackSky via Spaceflight Inc.; USSOCOM; Melbourne Space Program; Swarm Technologies; SEDENA	Success	No attempt
7	BlackSky Global 3 is part of a constellation of Earth-observing satellites. SpaceBEE cubesats are manufactured by Swarm Technologies to test two-way satellite communication and data relay. SpaceBEE 8 weighs 0.4 kg (0.88 lb) while SpaceBEE 9 weighs 0.7 kg (1.54 lb).								
8	"Look Ma, No Hands"	19 August 2019, 12:12	Mahia, LC-1A	Breizh Recon Orbiter (BRO-1); BlackSky Global 4; Experimental Satellites x 2	Approx. 80 kilograms (180 lb)	510 km, 94.8° LEO	UnseenLabs; BlackSky via Spaceflight Inc.; AFSPC	Success	No attempt
8	Breizh Recon Orbiter (BRO-1) is part of a constellation used for tracking maritime vessels. BlackSky Global 4 is part of a constellation of Earth-observing satellites. The two experimental satellites for Air Force Space Command are part of the "Pearl White" technology demonstration program.								
9	"As the Crow Flies"	17 October 2019, 01:22	Mahia, LC-1A	Palisade	Approx. 20 kilograms (44 lb)	1200 km, 87.9° LEO	Astro Digital	Success	No attempt
9	Palisade is a 16U CubeSat technology demonstrator satellite. An upgraded, bi-propellant kick stage lifted the satellite to a 1200 km circular orbit, and then deorbited itself.								
10	"Running Out Of Fingers"	6 December 2019, 08:18	Mahia, LC-1A	ALE-2; ATL-1; Fossasat-1; NOOR-1A (Unicorn 2B); NOOR-1B (Unicorn 2C); SMOG-P; TRSI Sat	Approx. 77 kilograms (170 lb)	385 x 400 km, 97°LEO	ALE Co., LTD; Advanced Technology of Laser; Fossa Systems; Stara Space; Budapest University of Technology and Economics; ACME AtronOmatic	Success	Controlled (atmosphere test)
10	ALE-2 creates artificial shooting star displays. ATL-1 tests thermal insulation in space. FossaSat-1 is a communications satellite that uses low-power radio frequencies to provide internet connectivity. NOOR-1A and NOOR-1B demonstrated intersatellite link technology. SMOG-P uses a spectrum analyzer to measure electromagnetic pollution. TRSI Sat provides flight tracking services. The six satellites other than ALE-2 are PocketQubes, forming Alba Cluster 2 of Alba Orbital. This mission also was the first guided, full telemetry re-entry of the Electron launch vehicle's first stage as part of Rocket Lab's plans to re-use and re-fly rocket boosters in future missions. Recovery instrumentation on-board this flight included guidance and navigation hardware, including S-band telemetry and on-board flight computer systems, to live-gather data during the first stage's atmospheric re-entry, as well as a reaction control system to orient the booster. After the launch Rocket Lab said that the reusability tests were successful. First flight of Electron with a fully autonomous flight termination system on the rocket.								

=== 2020 ===
First launch for the National Reconnaissance Office in January 2020.

First launch of Photon kickstage in August 2020.

Flight No.	Name	Date/time (UTC)	Launch site	Payload	Payload Mass	Destination	Customer(s)	Launch outcome	Booster recovery
11	"Birds of a Feather"	31 January 2020, 02:56	Mahia, LC-1A	NROL-151	Classified	590 km x 610 km, 70.9° LEO	National Reconnaissance Office	Success	Controlled (atmosphere test)
11	First launch for the National Reconnaissance Office (NRO). The NRO competitively awarded the contract under the Rapid Acquisition of a Small Rocket (RASR) contract vehicle. RASR allows the NRO to explore new launch opportunities that can provide a streamlined, commercial approach for getting small satellites into space. For the second time, the Electron booster survived atmospheric re-entry. Rocket Lab again said that their reusability test was successful.								
12	"Don't Stop Me Now"	13 June 2020, 05:12:12	Mahia, LC-1A	Classified payloads x 3 (USA-301, 302, 303) (NRO); ANDESITE; RAAF M2PF (Pathfinder)	Classified	570*590 km, 97.75° LEO	NRO, Boston University / NASA and University of New South Wales Canberra Space and the Royal Australian Air Force.	Success	No attempt
12	Part of the ELaNa 32 mission, ANDESITE is a satellite designed to study Earth's magnetic field. The M2 Pathfinder satellite will be a technology demonstration satellite to test communications. The flight will also carry three payloads for the NRO. Rocket Lab does not plan to do any recovery testing. Flight delayed due to COVID-19. A launch attempt on 11 June 2020 was canceled due to bad weather. ANDESITE consists of ANDESITE Mule, a 6U parent spacecraft, and ANDESITE Node 1 to Node 8, small magnetometer subsatellites to be ejected from it to study magnetospheric variation. Each Node is 0.20 x 0.10 x 0.025 m in size with a mass of 0.38 kg.								
13	"Pics Or It Didn't Happen"	4 July 2020; 21:19:36	Mahia, LC-1A	CE-SAT-IB; SuperDove x 5; Faraday 1	Approx. 75 kg (165 lb)	500 km, 97.5° SSO	Canon Electronics; Planet Labs; In-Space Missions	Failure	No attempt
13	Launch of five SuperDoves as part of Planet's Flock 4e. Flight failed during 2nd stage burn. The issue was found to be a single faulty electrical connection that was not caught during preflight testing. The wiring was intermittently secure leading to increasing resistance causing heating and thermal expansion. This caused softening of potting compounds around the connection leading to a disconnect. The disconnect lead to power being cut from the electric turbopumps needed for the Rutherford engine leading the engine to be shut down. No changes were made to the vehicle but changes were made to "work instructions and quality signoffs".								
14	"I Can't Believe It's Not Optical"	31 August 2020; 03:05:47	Mahia, LC-1A	Sequoia; Photon (First Light)	100 kg	500 km, 45° LEO	Capella Space	Success	No attempt
14	Return to flight of Electron after the 4 July 2020 launch failure. Launch of a synthetic-aperture radar (SAR) satellite, for global imagery. Also launched the Photon satellite bus.								
15	"In Focus"	28 October 2020; 21:21:27	Mahia, LC-1A	SuperDove x 9; CE-SAT-IIB	72 kg	500 km, 97.5° SSO	Planet Labs; Spaceflight, Inc. for Canon Electronics	Success	No attempt
15	After satellite deployed kick stage changed orbital inclination.								
16	"Return To Sender"	20 November 2020; 02:20:01	Mahia, LC-1A	Dragracer A; Dragracer B; BRO-2; BRO-3; APSS-1 (Te Waka Āmiorangi o Aotearoa) (Auckland Program for Space Systems); SpaceBEE x 24; Gnome Chompski (garden gnome mass simulator)	200 kg	500 km, 97.3° SSO	TriSept Corp.; UnseenLabs; Te Pūnaha Ātea - Auckland Space Institute, The University of Auckland; Swarm Technologies; Gabe Newell	Success	Success (Ocean landing)
16	First Electron to attempt a soft ocean landing by parachute with the booster and recovery by vessel.								
17	"The Owl's Night Begins"	15 December 2020; 10:09:27	Mahia, LC-1A	StriX-α	150 kg	500 km, 97.3° SSO	Synspective	Success	No attempt
17	Test satellite weighing 150 kg (330 lb) using synthetic-aperture radar (SAR) from a Japanese company. Part of a future constellation of 25 satellites to provide global coverage. Satellite was encompassed in an expanded fairing. First of 47 dedicated launches for Synspective's StriX constellation.								

=== 2021 ===
First launch for US Space Force in July 2021.

Flight No.	Name	Date/time (UTC)	Launch site	Payload	Payload Mass	Destination	Customer(s)	Launch outcome	Booster recovery
18	"Another One Leaves The Crust"	20 January 2021; 07:26:00	Mahia, LC-1A	GMS-T	~50 kg	1200 km, 90° LEO	OHB	Success	No attempt
18	Dedicated mission for OHB, the launch occurred six months after the contract signing with Rocket Lab and OHB.								
19	"They Go Up So Fast"	22 March 2021; 22:30	Mahia, LC-1A	BlackSky Global 9; Centauri 3; Myriota 7; Veery Hatchling; RAAF-M2 A, B; Gunsmoke-J; Photon (Pathstone)	Unknown	450 km and 550 km, 45° LEO	BlackSky via Spaceflight Inc.; Fleet Space; Myriota; Care Weather Technologies; University of New South Wales Canberra Space; (USASMDC); Rocket Lab	Success	No attempt
19	During this mission, Rocket Lab deployed their 100th satellite to orbit. As well as their second Photon satellite bus named Pathstone. Photon Pathstone will operate on orbit as a risk reduction demonstration to build spacecraft heritage ahead of Rocket Lab's mission to the Moon for NASA later this year, as well as Rocket Lab's private mission to Venus in 2025.								
20	"Running Out Of Toes"	15 May 2021; 11:11	Mahia, LC-1A	BlackSky-10, BlackSky-11	120 kg	430 km, 50° LEO	BlackSky via Spaceflight Industries, Inc.	Failure	Success (Ocean landing)
20	Second launch to attempt booster recovery (via ocean landing), using an advanced heat shield based on lessons learned from the first recovered Electron booster. First of four 2021 launches to carry two BlackSky Global Gen 2 satellites. Second stage engine shut down early causing the mission to be lost, but Electron's first stage safely completed a successful splashdown under parachute. The investigation revealed that the second stage igniter fault induced an interference with the engine controller that caused the data signal corruption for the thrust vector control (TVC) system, straying the vehicle off course.								
21	"It's A Little Chile Up Here"	29 July 2021; 06:00	Mahia, LC-1A	Monolith	Unknown	600 km, 37° LEO	U.S. Space Force	Success	No attempt
21	The launch was originally scheduled to fly from LC-2 in Wallops in 2020, but NASA didn't certify the autonomous flight termination system (AFTS) in time. Because of these delays, the launch was moved to LC-1 as the return to flight after the anomaly Electron experienced during the "Running Out Of Toes" mission in May 2021.								
22	"Love At First Insight"	18 November 2021; 01:38:13	Mahia, LC-1A	BlackSky-14, BlackSky-15	120 kg	430 km, 42°LEO	BlackSky via Spaceflight Inc.	Success	Success (Ocean landing)
22	Second of four launches to carry two BlackSky Global Gen 2 satellites in 2021. Mission was named "Love At First Insight". The first stage booster performed a soft ocean splashdown under parachute. For the first time, a helicopter tracked and observed Electron's descent in preparation for future missions which aim to use helicopters to intercept and capture returning launch vehicle boosters mid-air as they return to Earth under parachute. The launch vehicle also flew with an advanced parachute deployed from the first stage at a higher altitude then previous recovery attempts and an improved heat shield.								
23	"A Data With Destiny"	9 December 2021 00:02	Mahia, LC-1A	BlackSky-12 Gen-2, BlackSky-13 Gen-2	120 kg	430 km, 42°LEO	BlackSky via Spaceflight Inc.	Success	No attempt
23	Third of four launches to carry two BlackSky Global Gen 2 satellites in 2021. This mission set a new turnaround record between Electron launches at just 20 days.								

=== 2022 ===
Flight No.	Name	Date/time (UTC)	Launch site	Payload	Payload Mass	Destination	Customer(s)	Launch outcome	Booster recovery
24	"The Owl's Night Continues"	28 February 2022; 20:37	Mahia, LC-1B	StriX-β	~150 kg	561 km, 97° SSO	Synspective	Success	No attempt
24	Inaugural launch from Launch Complex 1 Pad B. Second of 47 dedicated launches for Synspective's StriX constellation.								
25	"Without Mission A Beat"	2 April 2022; 12:41	Mahia, LC-1A	BlackSky-14 Gen-2, BlackSky-15 Gen-2	~120 kg	430 km, 53° LEO	BlackSky via Spaceflight Inc.	Success	No attempt
25	Last of four launches to carry two BlackSky Global Gen 2 satellites in 2021 and 2022.								
26	"There And Back Again"	2 May 2022; 22:49	Mahia, LC-1A	TRSI-2 & TRSI-3; MyRadar-1; Unicorn-2; Copia; AuroraSat-1; E-Space Demo (3 satellites); SpaceBEE (24 satellites); BRO-6	Unknown	520 km, 94° SSO	Alba Orbital; Astrix Astronautics; Aurora Propulsion Technologies; E-Space; Swarm Technologies via Spaceflight Inc.; UnseenLabs	Success	Partial failure (aerial capture)
26	Deployed 34 satellites for six customers. First mid-air helicopter capture attempt of an Electron first stage following launch. Electron was initially captured by the helicopter, but the pilot detected different load characteristics than previously experienced in testing and offloaded the stage for a splashdown, where it was recovered by Rocket Lab's contracted offshore vessel, Seaworker as in previous ocean landings.								
27	"CAPSTONE"	28 June 2022; 09:55	Mahia, LC-1B	CAPSTONE; Photon	80 kg	TLI to NRHO	NASA; Rocket Lab	Success	No attempt
27	Cislunar Autonomous Positioning System Technology Operations and Navigation Experiment (CAPSTONE) is a CubeSat mission that will serve as a precursor for the planned Gateway. It used Photon to place CAPSTONE on a trajectory to the Moon. CAPSTONE will move into a near-rectilinear halo orbit (NRHO) after separation from Photon. Due to the heavy nature of the payload, the first stage was stripped down to its bare frame with no recovery hardware and no cameras. The recovery hardware itself takes about 10-15% of the payload mass capabilities of a given launch.								
28	"Wise One Looks Ahead".	13 July 2022; 06:30	Mahia, LC-1A	NROL-162 (RASR-3)	Classified	620 km, 40° LEO	NRO	Success	No attempt
28	First of two "Responsive Space Missions" NRO launches. Back to back launches between Pad A and B.								
29	"Antipodean Adventure"	4 August 2022; 05:00	Mahia, LC-1B	NROL-199 (RASR-4)	Classified	620 km, 70°LEO	NRO	Success	No attempt
29	Second of two "Responsive Space Missions" NRO launches. Back to back launches between Pad A and B.								
30	"The Owl Spreads Its Wings"	15 September 2022; 20:38	Mahia, LC-1B	StriX-1	~100 kg	563 km, 97°SSO	Synspective	Success	No attempt
30	Third of 47 dedicated launches for Synspective's StriX constellation. StriX-1 is the 150th satellite deployed by Rocket Lab.								
31	"It Argos Up From Here"	7 October 2022; 17:09	Mahia, LC-1B	GAzelle (Argos-4)	118 kg	750 km 98° SSO	NOAA / CNES	Success	No attempt
31	First launch for General Atomics Electromagnetic Systems. The GAzelle satellite carries the Argos-4 Advanced Data Collection System hosted payload.								
32	"Catch Me If You Can"	4 November 2022; 17:27	Mahia, LC-1B	MATS	50 kg	585 km, 97.66° SSO	SNSA & OHB Sweden	Success	Partial failure (aerial capture)
32	Launch of MATS atmospheric research satellite for the Swedish National Space Agency. Second attempt at mid-air helicopter recovery of first stage, however due to telemetry loss from the first stage during its descent, it was not safe for the helicopter to loiter in the capture zone, so it backed off. Stage made a soft ocean landing and was recovered by Rocket Lab's contracted offshore vessel, Seaworker as in previous ocean landings.								

=== 2023 ===
Flight No.	Name	Date/time (UTC)	Launch site	Payload	Payload Mass	Destination	Customer(s)	Launch outcome	Booster recovery
33	"Virginia Is For Launch Lovers"	24 January 2023; 23:00	MARS, LC-2	HawkEye 360 Cluster 6 (3 satellites)	90 kg	550 km, 40.5° LEO	HawkEye 360	Success	No attempt
33	First launch from Launch Complex 2 at the Mid-Atlantic Regional Spaceport in Wallops. Launch of the first 3 of the 15 satellites contracted with HawkEye 360.								
34	"Stronger Together"	16 March 2023 22:39	MARS, LC-2	Capella 9, Capella 10	224 kg	600 km, 44° LEO	Capella Space	Success	No attempt
34	Dedicated launch for Capella Space.								
35	"The Beat Goes On"	24 March 2023 09:14	Mahia, LC-1B	BlackSky-18 Gen-2, BlackSky-19 Gen-2	~120 kg	450 km, 42° LEO	BlackSky via Spaceflight Inc.	Success	Success (Ocean landing)
35	Dedicated launch for BlackSky.								
36	"Rocket Like A Hurricane"	8 May 2023 01:00	Mahia, LC-1B	TROPICS × 2	10 kg	550 km, 32° LEO	NASA	Success	No attempt
36	First of two TROPICS missions awarded to Rocket Lab after a prior mission awarded to competing launch provider Astra failed to orbit. The TROPICS mission consists of four (formerly six) CubeSats intended for two (formerly three) low-Earth orbital planes at an inclination of 30 degrees. Due to the light weight of the payload and the target orbit, the second stage completed the orbital insertion while the kick stage was used to perform a plane change burn to the target inclination.								
37	"Coming to a Storm Near You"	26 May 2023 03:46	Mahia, LC-1B	TROPICS × 2	10 kg	550 km, 32° LEO	NASA	Success	No attempt
37	Second of two TROPICS missions awarded to Rocket Lab after a prior mission awarded to competing launch provider Astra failed to orbit.								
39	"Baby Come Back"	18 July 2023 01:27	Mahia, LC-1B	LEO 3; Lemur-2 × 2; Starling × 4	~86 kg	1000 km, 99.45° SSO	Telesat; Spire Global; NASA	Success	Success (Ocean landing)
39	The LEO 3 demonstration satellite will provide continuity for customer and ecosystem vendor testing campaigns following the decommissioning of Telesat's Phase 1 LEO satellite. This mission tested out new reusability technologies, including improved water sealing, a lighter parachute, and new hardware on the recovery vessel. NASA's Starling Mission, a 4 spacecraft swarm, was launched on this flight.								
40	"We Love The Nightlife"	23 August 2023 23:45	Mahia, LC-1B	Acadia 1	~165 kg	640 km, 53° LEO	Capella Space	Success	Success (Ocean landing)
40	First of four dedicated launches for Capella Space with Acadia satellites. For the first time on this mission, Rocket Lab is reusing a Rutherford engine from another mission launched in May 2022 "There And Back Again".								
41	"We Will Never Desert You"	19 September 2023 06:55	Mahia, LC-1B	Acadia 2	~165 kg	640 km, 53° LEO	Capella Space	Failure	No attempt
41	Second of four dedicated launches for Capella Space with Acadia satellites. An anomaly occurred after stage separation, which resulted in a failure to orbit. Due to a sharp change of voltage from 420V to 508V due to an arc leading to a short in the power system that is used for motor controls caused in the near vacuum of space as a result of phenomenon of Paschen's law in T+151 to T+152.66 seconds.								
42	"The Moon God Awakens"	15 December 2023 04:05	Mahia, LC-1B	QPS-SAR-5 (TSUKUYOMI-I)	~100 kg	575 km, 42° LEO	iQPS	Success	No attempt
42	The satellite was previously manifested as a LauncherOne payload. After Virgin Orbit's bankruptcy and shutdown, the payload was transferred to Electron. This mission was Electron's return to launch after a failure due to a second stage issue occurring in the previous mission ("We Will Never Desert You") on September 19.								

=== 2024 ===
Flight No.	Name	Date/time (UTC)	Launch site	Payload	Payload Mass	Destination	Customer(s)	Launch outcome	Booster recovery
43	"Four Of A Kind"	31 January 2024; 06:34	Mahia, LC-1B	Skylark × 4	~112 kg	530 km, 97° LEO	Spire Global and NorthStar Earth & Space	Success	Success (Ocean landing)
43	Dedicated launch for Spire Global.								
44	"On Closer Inspection"	18 February 2024; 14:52	Mahia, LC-1B	ADRAS-J	150 kg	600 km, 98° SSO	Astroscale	Success	No attempt
44	The Active Debris Removal by Astroscale-Japan (ADRAS-J) satellite will rendezvous with a spent Japanese H-2A upper stage launch vehicle body in low Earth orbit and demonstrate proximity operations in preparation for a future de-orbiting mission. Due to the special mission requirements, Electron had a near instantaneous launch window.								
45	"Owl Night Long"	12 March 2024; 15:03	Mahia, LC-1B	StriX-3	100 kg	561 km, 97° SSO	Synspective	Success	No attempt
45	Fourth of 47 dedicated launches for Synspective's StriX constellation.								
46	"Live and Let Fly"	21 March 2024; 07:25	MARS, LC-2	NROL-123 (4 Payloads)	Classified	LEO	National Reconnaissance Office (NRO)	Success	No attempt
46	The NROL-123 mission, was Rocket Lab’s first launch for the NRO from the United States after previously launching four NRO missions from Launch Complex 1 on New Zealand’s Māhia Peninsula.								
47	"Beginning Of The Swarm"	23 April 2024; 22:32	Mahia, LC-1B	NeonSat-1; ACS3	~115 kg	520 km Neonsat-1, 1.000 km ACS3, 97° SSO	KAIST; NASA	Success	No attempt
47	Rideshare mission including NASA's Advanced Composite Solar Sail System (ACS3).								
48	"Ready, Aim, PREFIRE"	25 May 2024; 07:41	Mahia, LC-1B	PREFIRE 1	~15 kg	525 km 97.5° SSO	NASA	Success	No attempt
48	First of two launches for NASA's PREFIRE mission.								
49	"PREFIRE And Ice"	5 June 2024; 03:15	Mahia, LC-1B	PREFIRE 2	~15 kg	525 km 97.5° SSO	NASA	Success	No attempt
49	Second of two launches for NASA's PREFIRE mission.								
50	"No Time Toulouse"	20 June 2024; 18:13	Mahia, LC-1B	Kinéis × 5	150 kg	635 km 98° SSO	Kinéis	Success	No attempt
50	First of five dedicated launches for Kinéis' IoT satellite constellation. Electron 50th mission.								
51	"Owl For One, One For Owl"	2 August 2024; 16:39	Mahia, LC-1B	StriX-4	100 kg	543 km, 43° LEO	Synspective	Success	No attempt
51	Fifth of 47 dedicated launches for Synspective's StriX constellation.								
52	"A Sky Full Of SARs"	11 August 2024; 13:18	Mahia, LC-1B	Acadia 3	165 kg	615 km, 53° LEO	Capella Space	Success	No attempt
52	Third of four dedicated launches for Capella Space with Acadia satellites.								
53	"Kinéis Killed The RadIoT Star"	20 September 2024; 23:01	Mahia, LC-1A	Kinéis × 5	150 kg	643 km 98° LEO	Kinéis	Success	No attempt
53	Second of five dedicated launches for Kinéis' IoT satellite constellation. First launch from LC-1A since July 2022.								
54	"Changes In Latitudes, Changes In Attitudes"	5 November 2024; 10:54	Mahia, LC-1B	Protosat-1	Classified	SSO	E-Space	Success	No attempt
54	Launch of a yet to identified satellite to SSO for an undisclosed customer. The customer is suspected to be Low Earth Orbit communication satellite constellation operator E-Space. Launch contract was signed less than 2 months before launch.								
56	"Ice AIS Baby"	25 November 2024; 03:55	Mahia, LC-1B	Kinéis × 5	150 kg	643 km 97° LEO	Kinéis	Success	No attempt
56	Third of five dedicated launches for Kinéis' IoT satellite constellation. Rocket Lab completes 200th satellites launched on this mission.								
58	"Owl The Way Up"	21 December 2024; 14:17	Mahia, LC-1B	StriX-2	100 kg	574 km, 97° SSO	Synspective	Success	No attempt
58	Sixth of 47 dedicated launches for Synspective's StriX constellation. Rocket Lab completes this year with 14 orbital launches and 2 of the suborbital HASTE program from Wallops in Virginia. A new record for the company with 16 launches in the year.								

=== 2025 ===
Flight No.	Name	Date/time (UTC)	Launch site	Payload	Payload Mass	Destination	Customer(s)	Launch outcome	Booster recovery
59	"IoT 4 You and Me"	8 February 2025; 20:43	Mahia, LC-1A	Kinéis × 5	150 kg	646 km 97° SSO	Kinéis	Success	No attempt
59	Fourth of five dedicated launches for Kinéis' IoT satellite constellation.								
60	"Fasten Your Space Belts"	18 February 2025 23:17	Mahia, LC-1B	BlackSky Gen-3 x 1	138 kg	470 km 59° LEO	BlackSky	Success	No attempt
60	Rocket Lab's first of multiple new missions for BlackSky.								
61	"The Lightning God Reigns"	15 March 2025; 00:00	Mahia, LC-1B	QPS-SAR-9	100 kg	575 km 42° LEO	iQPS	Success	No attempt
61	First of 17th dedicated launches to support the build out of iQPS’ planned constellation of 36 synthetic aperture radar (SAR) satellites.								
62	"High Five"	18 March 2025; 01:31	Mahia, LC-1A	Kinéis × 5	150 kg	650 km 97° SSO	Kinéis	Success	No attempt
62	Fifth of five dedicated launches for Kinéis' IoT satellite constellation.								
63	"Finding Hot Wildfires Near You"	26 March 2025; 15:30	Mahia, LC-1B	OroraTech OTC-P1 x 8	64 ~ 96 kg Approximately	550 km 97° SSO	OroraTech	Success	No attempt
63	OroraTech is developing a constellation of satellites with thermal infrared cameras that can provide 24/7 monitoring of wildfires globally, supporting better and faster wildfire response to protect forests, people, and infrastructure worldwide.								
64	"The Sea God Sees"	17 May 2025; 08:17	Mahia, LC-1A	QPS-SAR-10	100 kg	575 km 42° LEO	iQPS	Success	No attempt
64	Second of 17th dedicated launches to support the build out of iQPS’ planned constellation of 36 synthetic aperture radar (SAR) satellites.								
65	"Full Stream Ahead"	2 June 2025; 23:57	Mahia, LC-1B	BlackSky Gen-3 x 1	138 kg	470 km 59° LEO	BlackSky	Success	No attempt
65	Second of five dedicated launches for BlackSky's 3rd generation satellites.								
66	"The Mountain God Guards"	11 June 2025; 15:31	Mahia, LC-1A	QPS-SAR-11	100 kg	575 km 42° LEO	iQPS	Success	No attempt
66	Third of 17th dedicated launches to support the build out of iQPS’ planned constellation of 36 synthetic aperture radar (SAR) satellites.								
67	"Get The Hawk Outta Here"	26 June 2025; 17:28	Mahia, LC-1A	HawkEye 360 Cluster 12 (3 satellites); Kestrel-0A	105 kg	520 km 97.45° LEO	HawkEye 360	Success	No attempt
67	First of two dedicated launches for HawkEye 360.								
68	"Symphony In The Stars"	28 June 2025; 07:08	Mahia, LC-1B	Lyra Block 1-2 (Lyra-4)	~74 kg	650 km SSO	EchoStar	Success	No attempt
68	First of two dedicated missions on Electron to deploy a single spacecraft to a 650 km circular Earth orbit for a confidential commercial customer. A second dedicated launch on Electron to meet those same mission requirements is scheduled for launch before the end of 2025. A possible identity of the payload (based on the mission patch, mission name and the orbit altitude) is it being an EchoStar Lyra Block 1 S-band IoT (Internet-of-Things) communication satellite, of which 4 are planned. 2 Electron launches from the same launch complex in Mahia after 37h of the last launch with the "Get The Hawk Outta Here" mission from LC-1A, and a new record among Electron missions.								
69	"The Harvest Goddess Thrives"	5 August 2025; 04:10	Mahia, LC-1B	QPS-SAR-12	100 kg	575 km 42° LEO	iQPS	Success	No attempt
69	Fourth of 17th dedicated launches to support the build out of iQPS’ planned constellation of 36 synthetic aperture radar (SAR) satellites.								
70	"Live, Laugh, Launch"	23 August 2025; 22:42	Mahia, LC-1A	Calistus A, B, C, D, E	Unknown	655 km SSO	E-Space	Success	No attempt
70	Second of two dedicated missions on Electron to a 655 km circular Earth orbit for a confidential commercial customer. 1 month after launch, the 5 payloads were identified in Space-Track as Calistus, which must belong to E-Space, for a future communication constellation of the company. Electron 70th mission.								
73	"Owl New World"	14 October 2025; 16:33	Mahia, LC-1A	StriX-5	100 kg	583 km, 42° LEO	Synspective	Success	No attempt
73	Seventh of 47 dedicated launches for Synspective's StriX constellation, and the first of a renewed contract of 10 additional dedicated launches signed in June 2024.								
74	"The Nation God Navigates"	5 November 2025; 19:51	Mahia, LC-1B	QPS-SAR-14	100 kg	575 km 42° LEO	iQPS	Success	No attempt
74	Fifth of 17th dedicated launches to support the build out of iQPS’ planned constellation of 36 synthetic aperture radar (SAR) satellites.								
76	"Follow My Speed"	20 November 2025; 12:43	Mahia, LC-1A	BlackSky Gen-3 x 1	138 kg	LEO	BlackSky	Success	No attempt
76	Dedicated launch for a confidential commercial customer, launching a single spacecraft to a circular Earth orbit. Third of five dedicated launches for BlackSky's 3rd generation satellites. Payload and customer identities unconfirmed, identification based on mission patch similar to the BlackSky satellites.								
77	"RAISE And Shine"	14 December 2025; 03:09	Mahia, LC-1B	RAISE-4	110 kg	540km SSO	JAXA	Success	No attempt
77	RAISE-4 is part of the Innovative Satellite Technology Demonstration-4 mission. RAISE-4 (RApid Innovative payload demonstration SatellitE-4) is a satellite for on-orbit demonstrations of eight demonstration components and equipment selected by public solicitation. The satellite will be operated in response to requests from the demonstration theme proposers, and will provide experimental data of the demonstration devices and environmental data during the experiments.								
78	"Don't Be Such A Square"	18 December 2025; 05:03	MARS, LC-2	STP-S30	64 kg	550km VLEO	U.S. Space Force	Success	No attempt
78	The mission, slated to launch the satellite DISKSat, is a launch scheduled to take place within 24 months from contract award to demonstrate Rocket Lab's responsive space program.								
79	"The Wisdom God Guides"	21 December 2025; 06:36	Mahia, LC-1B	QPS-SAR-15	100 kg	575 km 42° LEO	iQPS	Success	No attempt
79	Sixth of 17th dedicated launches to support the build out of iQPS’ planned constellation of 36 synthetic aperture radar (SAR) satellites.								

=== 2026 ===
Flight No.	Name	Date/time (UTC)	Launch site	Payload	Payload Mass	Destination	Customer(s)	Launch outcome	Booster recovery
80	"The Cosmos Will See You Now"	22 January 2026; 10:52	Mahia, LC-1A	Open Cosmos Constellation x2 Satellites	Unknown Mass	1,050 km 89° LEO	Open Cosmos	Success	No attempt
80	First 2 satellites of Open Cosmos' secure LEO broadband constellation designed to provide independent and resilient connectivity infrastructure for Europe and the world using high-priority Ka-band spectrum filings by the Principality of Liechtenstein.								
81	"Bridging The Swarm"	30 January 2026; 01:21	Mahia, LC-1A	NeonSat-1A	100 kg	540 km 97.4° SSO	KAIST	Success	No attempt
81	The NeonSat-1A Satellite is designed to test the constellation capabilities of the South Korean government's microsatellite constellation. The microsatellite constellation is the first satellite system developed by the government using a mass-production approach for precise monitoring of the Korean Peninsula.								
83	"Insight At Speed Is A Friend Indeed"	5 March 2026; 23:53	Mahia, LC-1A	BlackSky Gen-3 x 1	138 kg	470 km LEO	BlackSky	Success	No attempt
83	Dedicated launch for a confidential commercial customer, launching a single spacecraft to orbit. Fourth of five dedicated launches for BlackSky's 3rd generation satellites.								
84	"Eight Days A Week"	20 March 2026; 18:10	Mahia, LC-1B	StriX-6	100 kg	573 km, 50.2° LEO	Synspective	Success	No attempt
84	Eighth of 47 dedicated launches for Synspective's StriX constellation.								
85	"Daughter Of The Stars"	28 March 2026; 09:14	Mahia, LC-1A	Celeste Pathfinder A × 2	~50 kg	510 km LEO	ESA	Success	No attempt
85	Rocket Lab has been selected by the European Space Agency (ESA) to deploy the first pair of satellites for a future navigation constellation, Celeste LEO-PNT (Low Earth Orbit Positioning, Navigation, and Timing). Rocket Lab will launch two “Pathfinder A” spacecraft, provided by European satellite prime contractors Thales Alenia Space and GMV, to a 510 km low Earth orbit.								
87	"Kakushin Rising"	23 April 2026; 03:09	Mahia, LC-1A	WASEDA-SAT-ZERO-II; FSI-SAT2; OrigamiSat-2; Mono-Nikko; ARICA-2; PRELUDE; MAGNARO-II x 2; KOSEN-2R	~25 kg	540 km, 97.5° SSO	JAXA	Success	No attempt
87	Part of JAXA's Innovative Satellite Technology Demonstration-4 mission. JAXA-manifested rideshare of eight separate spacecraft that includes educational small sats, an ocean monitoring satellite, a demonstration satellite for ultra-small multispectral cameras, and a deployable antenna that can be packed tightly using origami folding techniques and unfurled to 25 times its size.								
88	"Viva La StriX"	22 May 2026; 09:33	Mahia, LC-1B	StriX-7	100 kg	572 km, 44.8° LEO	Synspective	Success	No attempt
88	Ninth of 47 dedicated launches for Synspective's StriX constellation.								
90	"VICTUS HAZE"	19 June 2026; 10:19	Mahia, LC-1A	Victus Haze Puma (TacRS 4)	Classified	347 km x 461 km, 97.5° SSO	Space Systems Command	Success	No attempt
90	Rocket Lab was contracted to design, build, launch, and operate a technology demonstration satellite for the U.S. Space Force's Tactically Responsive Space (TacRS) program. Once the spacecraft build phase was complete, the mission entered a "hot standby" phase awaiting launch. Rocket Lab will have just 24 hours' notice from Space Force to launch the spacecraft. Once on orbit, the spacecraft will perform rendezvous and proximity operations (RPO) with True Anomaly's Jackal autonomous orbital vehicle, which was launched separately by a Falcon 9 as a ride-share payload for the CAS500-2 mission.								
91	"Ten Owl Of Ten"	26 June 2026; 17:43	Mahia, LC-1B	StriX-8	100 kg	552 km, 42° LEO	Synspective	Success	No attempt
91	10th of 47 dedicated launches for Synspective's StriX constellation.								
92	"The Grain Goddess Provides"	6 August 2026; 09:18	Mahia, LC-1A	QPS-SAR-13	100 kg	575 km 42° LEO	iQPS	Success	No attempt
92	Seventh of 17 dedicated launches to support the build out of iQPS’ planned constellation of 36 synthetic aperture radar (SAR) satellites.								
93	"The Lightning God Defends"	20 August 2026; 13:04	Mahia, LC-1B	QPS-SAR-18	100 kg	575 km 42° LEO	iQPS	Success	No attempt
93	Eighth of 17 dedicated launches to support the build out of iQPS’ planned constellation of 36 synthetic aperture radar (SAR) satellites.								
94	"Owl Around The World"	2 September 2026; 12:01	Mahia, LC-1B	StriX-9	100 kg	575 km, 38° LEO	Synspective	Success	No attempt
94	11th of 47 dedicated launches for Synspective's StriX constellation.								
95	"Happily Ever Faster"	11 September 2026; 03:28	Mahia, LC-1A	BlackSky Gen-3 x 1	138 kg	500 km LEO	BlackSky	Success	No attempt
95	Dedicated launch for a confidential commercial customer, launching a single spacecraft to orbit. Fifth of five dedicated launches for BlackSky's 3rd generation satellites.								
96	"Owl By The Dozen"	19 September 2026; 03:22	Mahia, LC-1B	StriX-10	100 kg	572 km, 38° LEO	Synspective	Success	No attempt
96	12th of 47 dedicated launches for Synspective's StriX constellation.								
97	"Owlright, Owlright, Owlright"	26 September 2026; 00:39	Mahia, LC-1B	StriX-12	100 kg	559 km, 37° LEO	Synspective	Success	No attempt
97	13th of 47 dedicated launches for Synspective's StriX constellation.								
98	"We're Not Hawking Around"	23 October 2026; 07:11	Mahia, LC-1A	HawkEye 360 Cluster 16 (3 satellites)	90 kg	520 km, 97° SSO	HawkEye 360	Success	No attempt
98	Second of two dedicated launches for HawkEye 360.								
99	"The Sea God Surveys"	2 November 2026; 16:41	Mahia, LC-1A	QPS-SAR-20	100 kg	575 km 42° LEO	iQPS	Success	No attempt
99	Ninth of 17 dedicated launches to support the build out of iQPS’ planned constellation of 36 synthetic aperture radar (SAR) satellites.								
100	"The Mountain God Rises"	14 November 2026; 05:30	Mahia, LC-1A	QPS-SAR-19	100 kg	575 km 42° LEO	iQPS	Success	No attempt
100	Tenth of 17 dedicated launches to support the build out of iQPS’ planned constellation of 36 synthetic aperture radar (SAR) satellites. 100th mission.								

== Upcoming orbital launches ==
=== 2026 – due ===
Date/time (UTC)	Launch site	Payload	Planned destination	Customer
27 November 2026; 00:05	Mahia, LC-1	StriX-13	LEO	Synspective
27 November 2026; 00:05	14th of 47 dedicated launches for Synspective's StriX constellation. "Night Owls Never Sleep" Mission			
December 2026	Mahia, LC-1	LOXSAT	SSO	Eta Space
December 2026	Rocket Lab will launch a Photon spacecraft for Eta Space and NASA's LOXSAT mission, an on-orbit technology demonstration of a cryogenic fluid management system, that will inform the design of Cryo-Dock, a full-scale cryogenic propellant depot in low Earth orbit to be operational in 2030.			
December 2026	Mahia, LC-1	Aspera	LEO	NASA
December 2026	Rocket Lab will launch the Aspera spacecraft, a SmallSat to study galaxy formation and evolution, providing new insights into how the universe works. Rocket Lab was selected as part of NASA's Venture-Class Acquisition of Dedicated and Rideshare (VADR) launch services contract.			
2026	Mahia, LC-1	Acadia 10 (Capella-20)	LEO	Capella Space
2026	Fourth of four dedicated launches for Capella Space with Acadia satellites. Includes an option to move any of the missions to MARS LC-2.			
NET 2026	Mahia, LC-1	Venus Life Finder	Heliocentric	Rocket Lab
NET 2026	Private Venus exploration mission, using an atmospheric-entry probe developed jointly with MIT. A Photon relay satellite will perform a flyby of Venus in order to relay the data from the atmospheric-entry probe.			
2026	Mahia, LC-1	QPS-SAR-?	LEO	iQPS
2026	11th of 17 dedicated launches to support the build out of iQPS’ planned constellation of 36 synthetic aperture radar (SAR) satellites.			
2026–2027	Mahia, LC-1	QPS-SAR-?	LEO	iQPS
2026–2027	12th of 17 dedicated launches to support the build out of iQPS’ planned constellation of 36 synthetic aperture radar (SAR) satellites.			
2026–2027	Mahia, LC-1	QPS-SAR-?	LEO	iQPS
2026–2027	13th of 17 dedicated launches to support the build out of iQPS’ planned constellation of 36 synthetic aperture radar (SAR) satellites.			
2026–2027	Mahia, LC-1	QPS-SAR-?	LEO	iQPS
2026–2027	14th of 17 dedicated launches to support the build out of iQPS’ planned constellation of 36 synthetic aperture radar (SAR) satellites.			
NET 2027	Mahia, LC-1	QPS-SAR-?	LEO	iQPS
NET 2027	15th of 17 dedicated launches to support the build out of iQPS’ planned constellation of 36 synthetic aperture radar (SAR) satellites.			
NET 2027	Mahia, LC-1	QPS-SAR-?	LEO	iQPS
NET 2027	16th of 17 dedicated launches to support the build out of iQPS’ planned constellation of 36 synthetic aperture radar (SAR) satellites.			
NET 2027	Mahia, LC-1	QPS-SAR-?	LEO	iQPS
NET 2027	17th of 17 dedicated launches to support the build out of iQPS’ planned constellation of 36 synthetic aperture radar (SAR) satellites.			
2026–2027	Mahia, LC-1	StriX	LEO	Synspective
2026–2027	15th of 47 dedicated launches for Synspective's StriX constellation.			
2026–2027	Mahia, LC-1	StriX	LEO	Synspective
2026–2027	16th of 47 dedicated launches for Synspective's StriX constellation.			
2026–2027	Mahia, LC-1	StriX	LEO	Synspective
2026–2027	17th of 47 dedicated launches for Synspective's StriX constellation, and the second of a renewed contract of 10 additional dedicated launches signed in September 2025, 16 to 26th.			
2026–2027	Mahia, LC-1	StriX	LEO	Synspective
2026–2027	18th of 47 dedicated launches for Synspective's StriX constellation.			
2026–2027	Mahia, LC-1	StriX	LEO	Synspective
2026–2027	19th of 47 dedicated launches for Synspective's StriX constellation.			
2026–2027	Mahia, LC-1	StriX	LEO	Synspective
2026–2027	20th of 47 dedicated launches for Synspective's StriX constellation.			
2026–2027	Mahia, LC-1	StriX	LEO	Synspective
2026–2027	21st of 47 dedicated launches for Synspective's StriX constellation.			
2026–2027	Mahia, LC-1	StriX	LEO	Synspective
2026–2027	22nd of 47 dedicated launches for Synspective's StriX constellation.			
2026–2027	Mahia, LC-1	StriX	LEO	Synspective
2026–2027	23th of 47 dedicated launches for Synspective's StriX constellation.			
2026–2027	Mahia, LC-1	StriX	LEO	Synspective
2026–2027	24th of 47 dedicated launches for Synspective's StriX constellation.			
2026–2027	Mahia, LC-1	StriX	LEO	Synspective
2026–2027	25th of 47 dedicated launches for Synspective's StriX constellation.			
2026–2027	Mahia, LC-1	StriX	LEO	Synspective
2026–2027	26th of 47 dedicated launches for Synspective's StriX constellation.			
2028–2031	Mahia, LC-1	StriX	LEO	Synspective
2028–2031	27th of 47 dedicated launches for Synspective's StriX constellation, and the first of a new contract of 20 additional dedicated launches signed in September 2026, 27 to 47th.			
2028–2031	Mahia, LC-1	StriX	LEO	Synspective
2028–2031	28th of 47 dedicated launches for Synspective's StriX constellation.			
2028–2031	Mahia, LC-1	StriX	LEO	Synspective
2028–2031	29th of 47 dedicated launches for Synspective's StriX constellation.			
2028–2031	Mahia, LC-1	StriX	LEO	Synspective
2028–2031	30th of 47 dedicated launches for Synspective's StriX constellation.			
2028–2031	Mahia, LC-1	StriX	LEO	Synspective
2028–2031	31st of 47 dedicated launches for Synspective's StriX constellation.			
2028–2031	Mahia, LC-1	StriX	LEO	Synspective
2028–2031	32nd of 47 dedicated launches for Synspective's StriX constellation.			
2028–2031	Mahia, LC-1	StriX	LEO	Synspective
2028–2031	33rd of 47 dedicated launches for Synspective's StriX constellation.			
2028–2031	Mahia, LC-1	StriX	LEO	Synspective
2028–2031	34th of 47 dedicated launches for Synspective's StriX constellation.			
2028–2031	Mahia, LC-1	StriX	LEO	Synspective
2028–2031	35th of 47 dedicated launches for Synspective's StriX constellation.			
2028–2031	Mahia, LC-1	StriX	LEO	Synspective
2028–2031	36th of 47 dedicated launches for Synspective's StriX constellation.			
2028–2031	Mahia, LC-1	StriX	LEO	Synspective
2028–2031	37th of 47 dedicated launches for Synspective's StriX constellation.			
2028–2031	Mahia, LC-1	StriX	LEO	Synspective
2028–2031	38th of 47 dedicated launches for Synspective's StriX constellation.			
2028–2031	Mahia, LC-1	StriX	LEO	Synspective
2028–2031	39th of 47 dedicated launches for Synspective's StriX constellation.			
2028–2031	Mahia, LC-1	StriX	LEO	Synspective
2028–2031	40th of 47 dedicated launches for Synspective's StriX constellation.			
2028–2031	Mahia, LC-1	StriX	LEO	Synspective
2028–2031	41st of 47 dedicated launches for Synspective's StriX constellation.			
2028–2031	Mahia, LC-1	StriX	LEO	Synspective
2028–2031	42nd of 47 dedicated launches for Synspective's StriX constellation.			
2028–2031	Mahia, LC-1	StriX	LEO	Synspective
2028–2031	43rd of 47 dedicated launches for Synspective's StriX constellation.			
2028–2031	Mahia, LC-1	StriX	LEO	Synspective
2028–2031	44th of 47 dedicated launches for Synspective's StriX constellation.			
2028–2031	Mahia, LC-1	StriX	LEO	Synspective
2028–2031	45th of 47 dedicated launches for Synspective's StriX constellation.			
2028–2031	Mahia, LC-1	StriX	LEO	Synspective
2028–2031	46th of 47 dedicated launches for Synspective's StriX constellation.			
2028–2031	Mahia, LC-1	StriX	LEO	Synspective
2028–2031	47th of 47 dedicated launches for Synspective's StriX constellation.			

== Suborbital launches (HASTE) ==
=== Completed launches ===
Flight No.	Name	Date/time (UTC)	Launch site	Payload	Payload Mass	Customer(s)	Launch outcome	Booster recovery
38	"Scout's Arrow"	18 June 2023; 01:24	MARS, LC-2	DYNAMO-A	Classified	Dynetics	Success	No attempt
38	Part of Multi-Service Advanced Capability Hypersonic Test Bed (MACH-TB) program.							
55	"HASTE A La Vista"	24 November 2024; 06:00	MARS, LC-2	MACH-TB	Classified	Leidos	Success	No attempt
55	First of four sub-Orbital launches for Leidos under the MACH-TB project.							
57	"Stonehenge"	14 December 2024; 01:00	MARS, LC-2	Unknown	Classified	Confidential	Success	No attempt
57	The launch deal was signed with a confidential customer just days after the first HASTE launch took place.							
71	"Jenna"	23 September 2025; 00:00	MARS, LC-2	Unknown	Classified	Unknown	Success	No attempt
71	Suborbital mission for Unknown Customer.							
72	"Justin"	1 October 2025; 00:28	MARS, LC-2	Unknown	Classified	Unknown	Success	No attempt
72	Suborbital mission for Unknown Customer.							
75	"Prometheus Run"	18 November 2025; 13:00	MARS, LC-2	Van	Classified	DIU	Success	No attempt
75	The mission deployed a government-provided primary payload developed by the Johns Hopkins University Applied Physics Laboratory, and multiple secondary payloads by federal and industry partners, which tested key technologies for missile defense applications.							
82	"That's Not A Knife"	28 February 2026; 00:00	MARS, LC-2	DART AE	Classified	DIU; Hypersonix	Success	No attempt
82	The Cassowary Vex mission will deploy a payload from Hypersonix called DART AE, a scramjet-powered hypersonic vehicle capable of speeds up to Mach 7. This mission will also demonstrate HASTE's direct inject capabilities by deploying the payload while the rocket is still ascending within Earth's atmosphere.							
86	"Bubbles"	22 April 2026; 01:36	MARS, LC-2	Unknown	Classified	Unknown	Success	No attempt
86	Suborbital mission for Unknown Customer.							
89	"Curveball"	11 June 2026; 08:00	MARS, LC-2	Unknown	Classified	Unknown	Success	No attempt
89	Suborbital mission for Unknown Customer. First HASTE launch to reach orbit, reaching an altitude of approximately 200km.							

=== Planned launches ===
Date/time (UTC)	Launch site	Payload	Apogee	Customer
NET 2026	MARS, LC-2	JAKE 4	Unknown	Unknown
NET 2026	Suborbital mission for unknown customer.			
NET 2026	MARS, LC-2	Unknown	Unknown	Leidos
NET 2026	Second of four sub-Orbital launches for Leidos under the MACH-TB project.			
NET 2026	MARS, LC-2	Unknown	Unknown	Leidos
NET 2026	Third of four sub-Orbital launches for Leidos under the MACH-TB project.			
NET 2026	MARS, LC-2	Unknown	Unknown	Leidos
NET 2026	Fourth of four sub-Orbital launches for Leidos under the MACH-TB project.			

== See also ==
- Falcon 1
- List of Vega Launches
- Vega (rocket)
- Neutron (rocket)
- Timeline of private spaceflight
