= Celeste (LEO-PNT) =

Satellite constellation

- Operator: European Space Agency

Constellation size
- Nominal satellites: 10 (plus 2 spares)
- Current usable satellites: 2
- First launch: 28 March 2026, 9:14 UTC
- Last launch: NET 2027

Orbital characteristics
- Orbital height: 510 km (320 mi)
- Website: LEO-PNT at ESA.int

Celeste (Italian pronunciation: [tʃeˈlɛste]) is a Low Earth orbit Positioning Navigation Timing (LEO-PNT) satellite constellation by the European Space Agency (ESA) intended to demonstrate the usefulness of LEO satellites for complementing and enhancing the services of higher orbit systems like Galileo or EGNOS. The first two satellites were launched in March 2026. Celeste was named after Maria Celeste, a 17th-century Poor Clares nun and a daughter of Galileo Galilei.

== Timeline ==
First two satellites (IOD1-2, Pathfinder A type), in the form of large CubeSats, one 12U and one 16U, were launched on 28 March 2026 on a Rocket Lab's Electron launch vehicle's flight "Daughter Of The Stars" from Launch Complex 1 on Māhia Peninsula, New Zealand to a quasi-polar orbit. This was Rocket Lab's first launch for ESA.

In early April 2026, the two spacecraft completed their LEOP and on 8 April 2026, ESTEC received the first navigation signal from the Celeste mission. On 16 April 2026, IOD-2 sent its first dual-frequency navigation signals in the L- and S-band. On 27 August 2026, ESA successfully demonstrated the transmission and reception of 3GPP-compliant 5G positioning signals from the IOD-2 satellite.

Later, eight of the larger and more complex Pathfinder B satellites will be launched to similar orbits. The entire constellation of 10 satellites is planned to be completed in 2027.

== Satellites ==
Celeste satellites
Satellite	COSPAR ID	Satellite bus	Manufacturer	Launch date	Launch vehicle	Launch site
IOD-1	2026-065A	12U CubeSat	GMV, OHB	1st attempt: 25 March 2026 (postponed due to weather); 2nd attempt: 28 March 2026, 9:14 UTC (success)	Rocket Lab Electron	Mahia, LC-1A
IOD-2	2026-065B	16U CubeSat	Thales Alenia Space	1st attempt: 25 March 2026 (postponed due to weather); 2nd attempt: 28 March 2026, 9:14 UTC (success)	Rocket Lab Electron	Mahia, LC-1A

== See also ==
- List of European Space Agency programmes and missions
