= MATS (satellite) =

Swedish research satellite

MATS (Mesospheric Airglow/Aerosol Tomography and Spectroscopy)
- Mission type: Climatology
- Operator: Swedish National Space Board
- COSPAR ID: MATS:2022-147A
- SATCAT no.: MATS:TBD
- Website: https://www.rymdstyrelsen.se/en/swedish-space-industry/swedish-satellites/mats/
- Mission duration: 2 years (planned); 2 years, 4 months and 3 days (elapsed)

Spacecraft properties
- Manufacturer: OHB Sweden, ÅAC Clyde Space, Stockholm University Chalmers University of Technology, KTH, Omnisys Instruments
- Launch mass: 50 kg (110 lb)
- Dimensions: 60 cm × 70 cm × 85 cm (24 in × 28 in × 33 in)
- Power: TBD

Start of mission
- Launch date: 4 November 2022, 17:27:00 UTC
- Rocket: Electron rocket
- Launch site: Rocket Lab Launch Complex 1
- Contractor: Rocket Lab

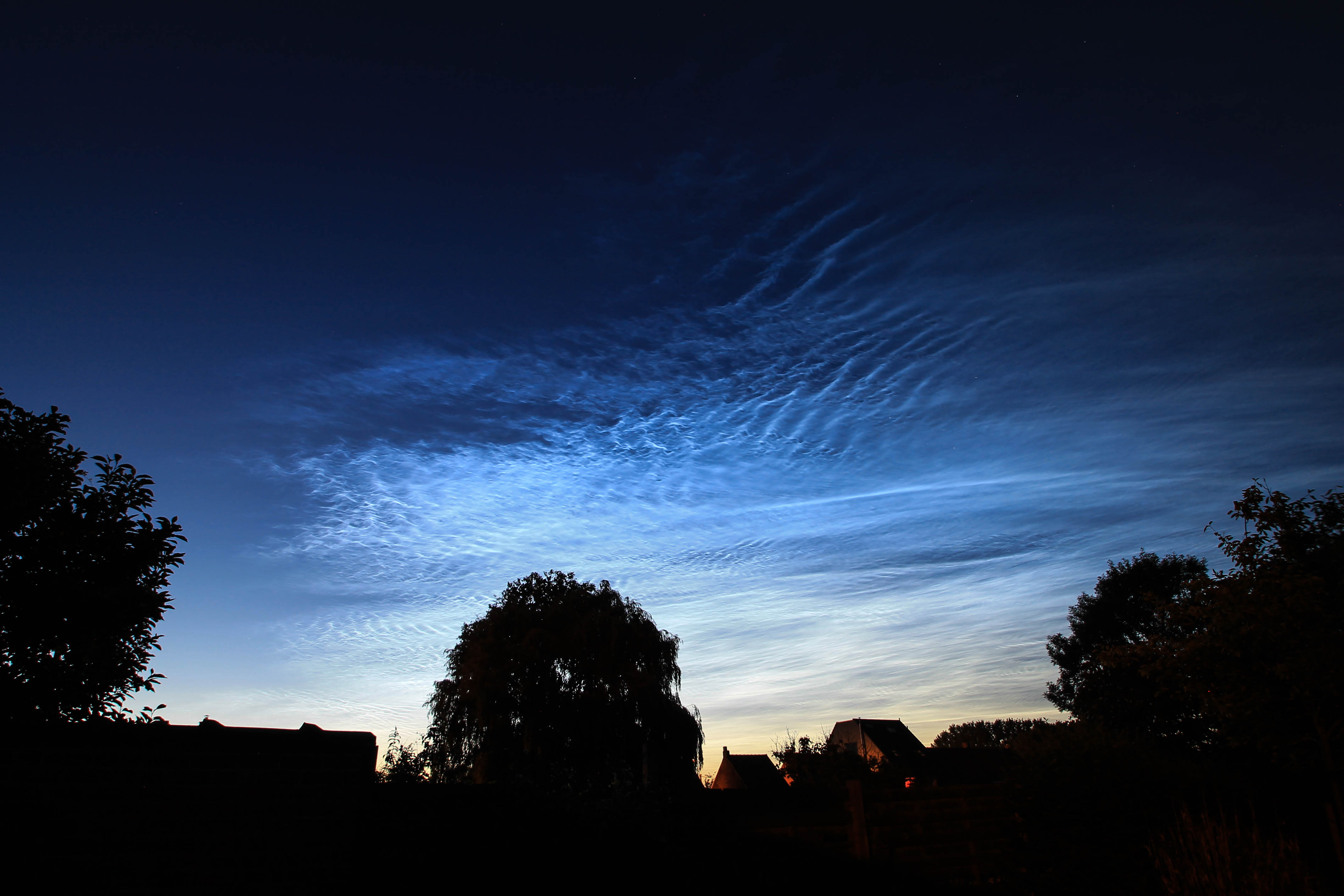
Waves in the Earth's mesosphere, seen in noctilucent clouds over the Netherlands in June 2019.

MATS (Mesospheric Airglow/Aerosol Tomography and Spectroscopy) is a Swedish research satellite designed for studying waves in Earth's atmosphere. Launch occurred on 4 November 2022 from the Rocket Lab Launch Complex 1 at the Mahia Peninsula in New Zealand.

MATS is planned to study atmospheric waves, providing data for atmospheric models monitoring future changes in the mesosphere, the atmospheric layer 50-100 km above sea level. In particular, MATS is designed to measure noctilucent clouds and atmospheric airglow from oxygen molecules.
