= IQPS =

Japanese satellite company

iQPS
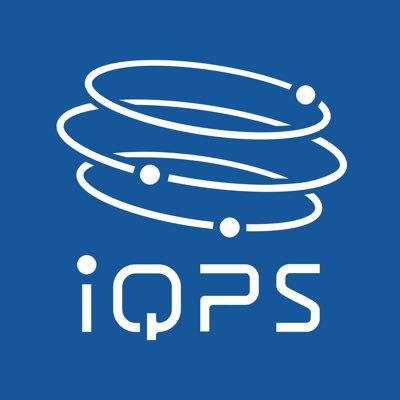
- Industry: Satellite imagery
- Founded: 2005 in Fukuoka, Japan
- Founders: Tetsuo Yasaka; Noboru Sakurai; Kunihiro Funakoshi
- Fate: Active
- Headquarters: Fukuoka, Japan
- Products: satellite images
- Website: i-qps.net

iQPS (Institute for Q-shu Pioneers of Space, Inc.) is a Japanese satellite manufacturer and operator. The company was founded as a spin-off company of Kyushu University in 2005. As of September 2025, the company operated seven Earth observation satellites, each equipped with a synthetic-aperture radar (SAR).

== History ==
iQPS was founded by Tetsuo Yasaka, Noboru Sakurai and Kunihiro Funakoshi in 2005 to promote the space industry in Kyushu. By 2013, with its members aging, the trio were considering to close the company when Shunsuke Onishi, then a graduate student studying at Kyushu University approached them intending to join iQPS. Onishi was hired on two conditions: that he become the company's CEO, and that he come up with a viable business plan. Onishi's idea was to build small SAR satellites and conduct real time observation of Earth. The company's first SAR satellite, IZANAGI was successfully launched by a PSLV rocket in 2019.

== List of satellites ==
Satellite List
Name	Nickname	Launch Date	Launch Vehicle	Site	Status
QSAT-EOS	Tsukushi	6 November 2014	Dnepr	Dombarovsky	Success
QPS-SAR-1	Izanagi	11 December 2019	PSLV-QL	Satish Dhawan	Success
QPS-SAR-2	Izanami	24 January 2022	Falcon 9 Block 5	Cape Canaveral	Success
QPS-SAR-3	Amateru-I	12 October 2022	Epsilon	Uchinora	Launch failure
QPS-SAR-4	Amateru-II	12 October 2022	Epsilon	Uchinora	Launch failure
QPS-SAR-5	Tsukuyomi-I	15 December 2023	Electron	Mahia	Operational
QPS-SAR-6	Amateru-III	12 June 2023	Falcon 9 Block 5	Vandenberg	Success
QPS-SAR-7	Tsukuyomi-II	7 April 2024	Falcon 9 Block 5	Kennedy	Operational
QPS-SAR-8	Amateru-IV	16 August 2024	Falcon 9 Block 5	Vandenberg	Operational
QPS-SAR-9	Susanoo-I	15 March 2025	Electron	Mahia	Operational
QPS-SAR-10	Wadatsumi-I	17 May 2025	Electron	Mahia	Operational
QPS-SAR-11	Yamatsumi-I	11 June 2025	Electron	Mahia	Operational
QPS-SAR-12	Kushinada-I	5 August 2025	Electron	Mahia	Operational
QPS-SAR-13	Mikura-I	6 August 2026	Electron	Mahia	Operational
QPS-SAR-14	Yachihoko-I	5 November 2025	Electron	Mahia	Operational
QPS-SAR-15	Sukunami-I	21 December 2025	Electron	Mahia	Operational
QPS-SAR-18	Susanoo-II	20 August 2026	Electron	Mahia	Operational
QPS-SAR-19	Yamatsumi-II	10 November 2026	Electron	Mahia	Planned
QPS-SAR-20	Wadatsumi-II	3 November 2026	Electron	Mahia	Planned

== See also ==
- Capella Space
- ICEYE
