= DiskSat =

DiskSat is a platform for small satellites with a disc-shaped geometry commissioned by NASA. The system is used to test alternative designs to established cuboid small satellites, especially for use in low and very low Earth orbits.

== Concept ==
DiskSat is designed as a round, flat satellite. The platform has a diameter of approximately 40 inches (1 m) and is 1 inch (2.5 cm) thick. The disc-shaped design differs significantly from the standard CubeSat geometry and is expected to offer advantages in terms of surface area, energy supply, and maneuverability.

The DiskSat design is based on a disc-shaped structure that allows for a broader arrangement of subsystems such as solar cells, antennas, and sensors. For central functions such as power supply, positioning, control, and communication, largely standardized small satellite subsystems are used to facilitate integration into existing processes.

The DiskSat platform is being developed as part of NASA's Small Spacecraft & Distributed Systems (SSDS) program to promote small satellite technologies. It was developed by The Aerospace Corporation in El Segundo, California.

The objectives of the DiskSat program are to test alternative satellite geometries, investigate operation in very low Earth orbits, validate standardized subsystems in a new platform form, and collect operational data for future small satellite missions.

The satellites are very streamlined and could be used in very low Earth orbits, making early applications in espionage likely.

== Demonstration mission ==
The first DiskSat mission is designed as a technology demonstration and comprises four satellites that were launched together and deployed one after the other at an altitude of 550 kilometers. The launch took place on December 18, 2025, at 12:03 p.m. local time using an Electron rocket from the launch complex at Wallops Flight Facility in Virginia, US. Launch services were provided by Rocket Lab.

The mission will investigate the structural behavior of the platform, its power supply, communication capabilities, and maneuverability in low orbits.
