= Humanity Star =

Miniaturized passive satellite

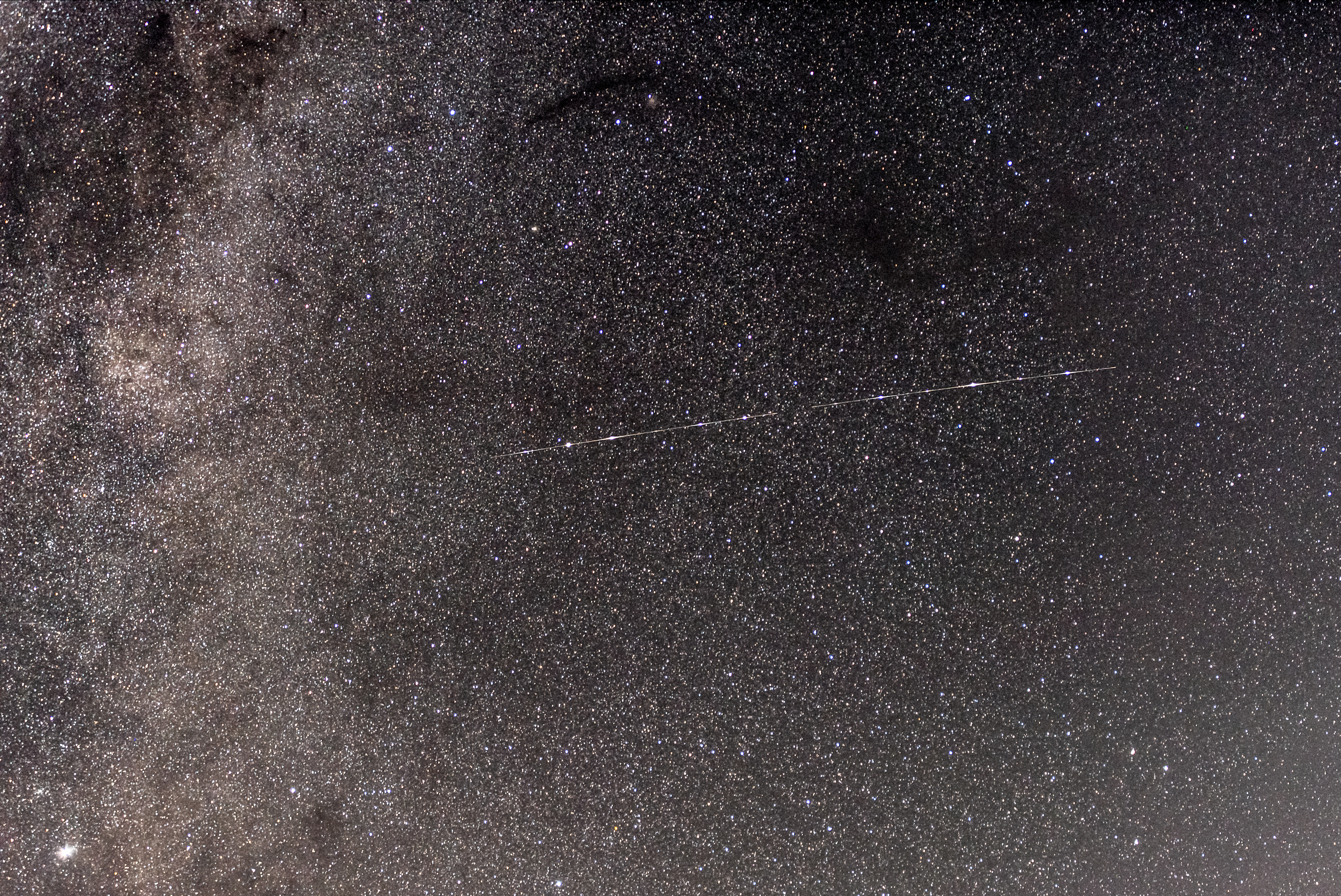
- Flare of Humanity Star as seen from Victoria, Australia
- Mission type: Public awareness
- COSPAR ID: 2018-010F
- SATCAT no.: 43168
- Mission duration: Planned: 9 months Final: 2 months, 1 day

Spacecraft properties
- Manufacturer: Rocket Lab
- Launch mass: 10.5 kg (23 lb)
- Dimensions: ≈1 m (3 ft)

Start of mission
- Launch date: 21 January 2018, 01:43 UTC
- Rocket: Electron
- Launch site: Rocket Lab LC-1
- Contractor: Rocket Lab

End of mission
- Disposal: Orbital re-entry
- Decay date: 22 March 2018, 13:15 UTC

Orbital parameters
- Reference system: Geocentric
- Regime: Polar
- Semi-major axis: 5,756.8 km (3,577.1 mi)
- Eccentricity: 0.014107
- Perigee altitude: 283.4 km (176.1 mi)
- Apogee altitude: 474.0 km (294.5 mi)
- Inclination: 82.9°
- Period: 92.1 min
- Epoch: 12 February 2018, 01:53:56 UTC

Humanity Star was a reflective passive satellite designed to produce visible, pulsing flares. The satellite was launched into orbit by an Electron rocket on 21 January 2018 and entered into the atmosphere on 22 March 2018. The reaction to Humanity Star was mostly negative by astronomers, as it interfered with their observations.

== Design ==
Humanity Star was designed to produce flares visible from Earth. The satellite was shaped like a geodesic sphere about 1 metre (3 ft) in diameter, with its 76 reflective panels on the shape make it look similar to a large disco ball. It is made out of carbon fiber and weigh 10.5 kilograms (23 lb). According to Rocket Lab, Humanity Star was meant to be "a bright symbol and reminder to all on Earth about our fragile place in the universe".

== Launch and orbit ==
Humanity Star was launched on 21 January 2018 at 01:43 UTC from Rocket Lab Launch Complex 1, located on the Māhia Peninsula of New Zealand. It orbited the Earth every 92 minutes in a polar orbit of approximately 290 by 520 km (180 by 320 mi) in altitude. According to Rocket Lab, the satellite's orbit was expected to decay after nine months, eventually burning up completely in Earth's atmosphere. However, the satellite re-entered several months early on 22 March 2018 at about 13:15 UTC. The quick entry could be caused by the Humanity Star's low density, amplifying atmospheric drag effects.

Because of its highly reflective surface, Rocket Lab claimed that Humanity Star could be seen by the naked eye from the surface of the Earth. Its apparent brightness was estimated to be magnitude 7.0 when half illuminated and viewed from a distance of 1,000 kilometres (620 mi), while its maximum brightness was estimated to be magnitude 1.6. The satellite was most likely to be visible in the night sky at dawn or dusk. Its orbit could be tracked by Heavens-Above and the satellite's website.

== Analysis ==
Initial reactions by astronomers were negative, since reflective objects in orbit interferes with astronomical observations. It has been described as an act of vandalism of the night sky, space graffiti, a "publicity stunt" and "glittery space garbage". Others however argue that flares by existing satellites and the ISS are much brighter than Humanity Star.

Alice Gorman postulates that Humanity Star and Elon Musk's Tesla Roadster are statements with very different but related messages: while Humanity Star may be seen as promoting a unifying vision and the Roadster as a reminder of inequality, "each tells the story of [human] attitudes to space at a particular point in time."

== See also ==
- KiwiSAT
- Light pollution
- Lincoln Calibration Sphere 1
- Project Echo
