= LOXSAT =

Proposed NASA technology demonstration satellite

LOXSAT is a NASA funded cryogenic fluid management demonstration satellite mission. Eta Space is building the payload. LOXSAT aims to demonstrate on-orbit docking and cryogenic refueling operations using a cryogenic fluid transfer disconnect and latching mechanism developed for depot applications. It will also demonstrate repeated mating/de-mating and the transfer of liquid oxygen. LOXSAT will demonstrate technologies for Eta's cryogenic propellant depot "Cryo-Dock", planned for deployment by 2030. It was originally scheduled to launch no earlier than 17 July 2026 on a Rocket Lab Electron launch vehicle. The follow-up LOXSAT2 mission, a full-scale operational depot, is being defined.

== See also ==
- Robotic Refueling Mission
- Propellant depot
