= PREFIRE =

NASA mission

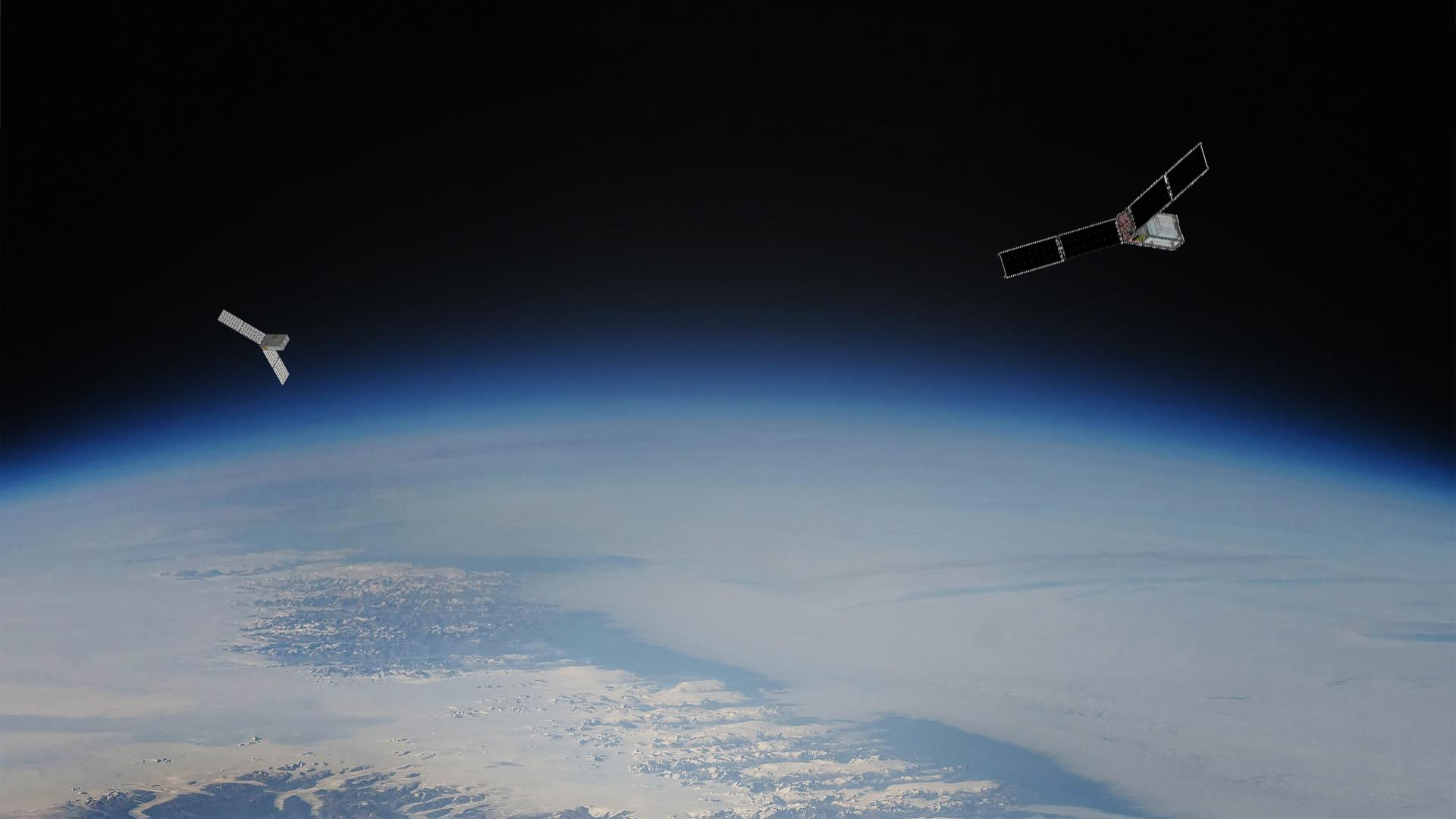
- PREFIRE satellites
- Mission type: Earth observation
- Operator: NASA
- Website: science.nasa.gov/mission/prefire/

Spacecraft properties
- Spacecraft: PREFIRE
- Spacecraft type: 6U CubeSat

Start of mission
- Launch date: First launch: 25 May 2024, 07:41 UTC; Last launch: 5 June 2024, 03:15 UTC
- Rocket: Electron
- Launch site: Mahia LC-1B
- Contractor: Rocket Lab

Orbital parameters
- Reference system: Geocentric orbit
- Regime: Low Earth Orbit
- Inclination: 97.5°
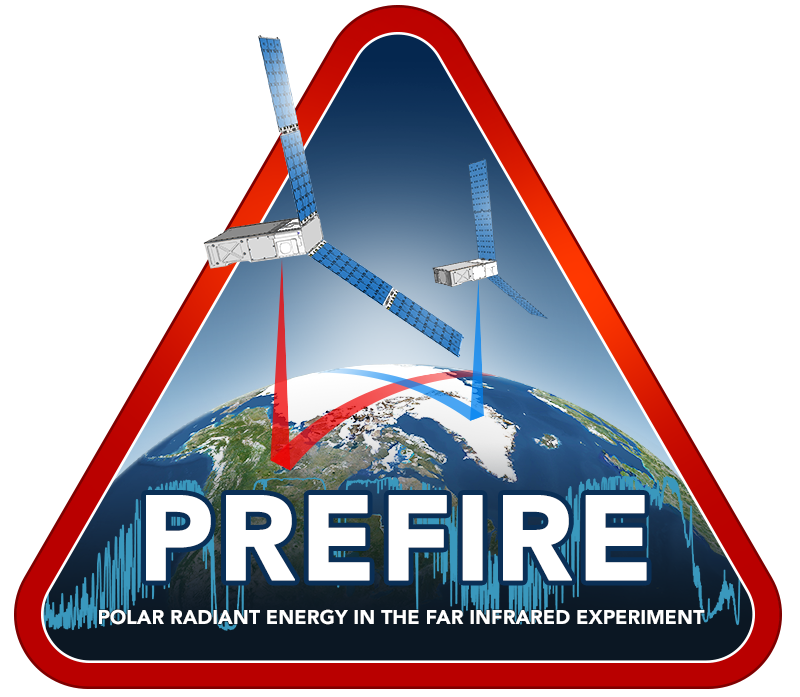
- PREFIRE Logo

PREFIRE (also known as Polar Radiant Energy In The Far Infrared Experiment) is a CubeSat of NASA mission designed to measure far-infrared (FIR) radiation emitted from Earth's polar regions. Launched in 2024, the mission uses two identical 6U CubeSats to provide the first comprehensive spectral observations of FIR emissions, which account for nearly 60% of outgoing longwave radiation in the Arctic. These measurements aim to improve understanding of polar energy budgets, the role of water vapor and clouds in the atmospheric greenhouse effect, and their implications for Arctic amplification, sea ice loss, and global climate models.

PREFIRE addresses key gaps in climate science by quantifying spatial and temporal variability in FIR emissivity and the greenhouse effect on hourly to seasonal scales. The mission was selected in 2019 under NASA's Earth Venture Instrument program and developed collaboratively by NASA's Jet Propulsion Laboratory (JPL) and the University of Wisconsin–Madison's Space Science and Engineering Center (SSEC).

== Mission ==
PREFIRE comprises two identical 6U CubeSats, each approximately shoebox-sized and weighing 10 kg, deployed into complementary sun-synchronous orbits at 531 km altitude and 97.5° inclination. This configuration provides diurnal sampling of polar regions (poleward of 60° latitude) with equator crossings at approximately 03:35/15:35 local time (PREFIRE-1) and 08:00/20:00 local time (PREFIRE-2), capturing short-timescale phenomena like cloud variability.

Without onboard propulsion, the satellites experience gradual orbital decay, enhancing spatial resolution over time while increasing vulnerability to space weather events such as geomagnetic storms. The prime mission duration was planned for 10–12 months to cover one seasonal cycle, but in August 2025, NASA extended operations through September 2026 and expanded the science focus from polar regions to global coverage for broader climate and weather modeling applications.

Each CubeSat features a miniaturized Thermal Infrared Spectrometer (TIRS) with a thermopile detector array (64 channels × 8 pixels), covering 3–54 μm at 0.84 μm spectral resolution. The instrument has a mass of <3 kg, power draw of 4.5 W, data rate of 12 kbps, and an 11.8 km cross-track footprint.

== Launches ==
Both of the CubeSat are launched on Rocket Lab Electron rocket, first launch took place on 25 May 2024 carrying PREFIRE-1 while the second satellites PREFIRE-2 launched on 5 June 2024 and both satellites reached orbit successfully. Rocket Lab named both launches as "Ready, Aim, PREFIRE" and "PREFIRE and ICE".

== Gallery ==
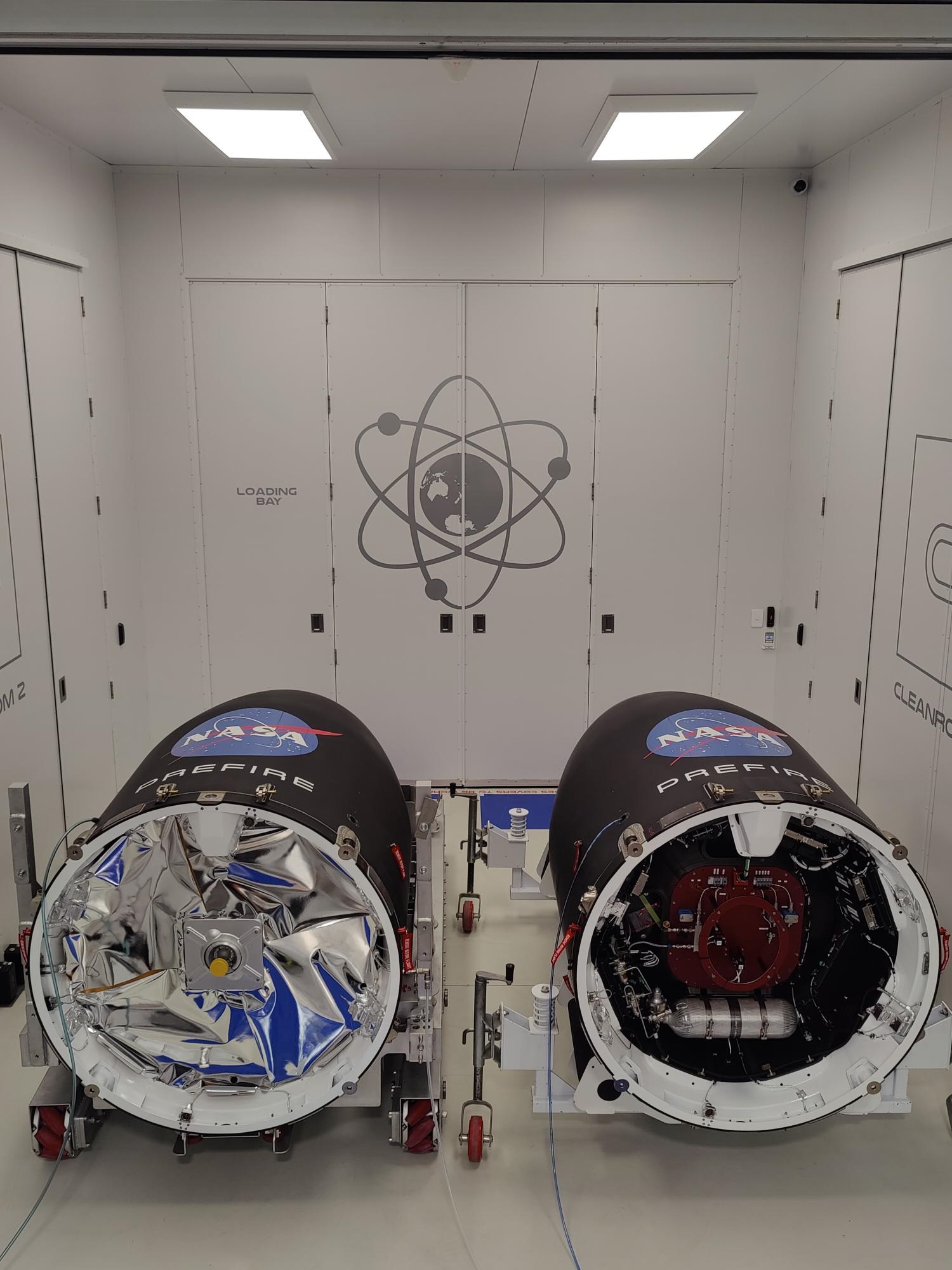
Both satellites during integration at Rocket Lab facilities

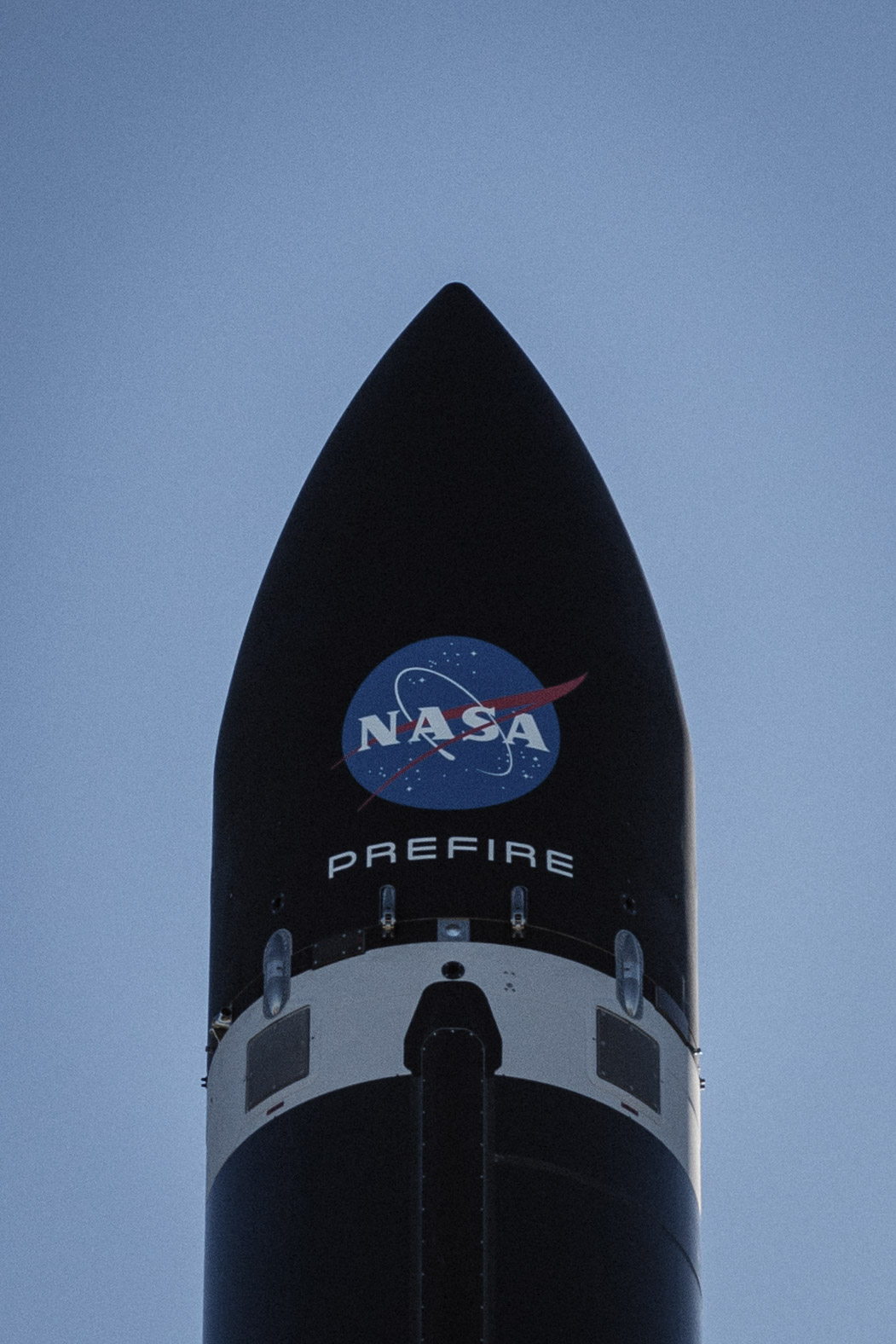
Electron at pad before launch of PREFIRE-1

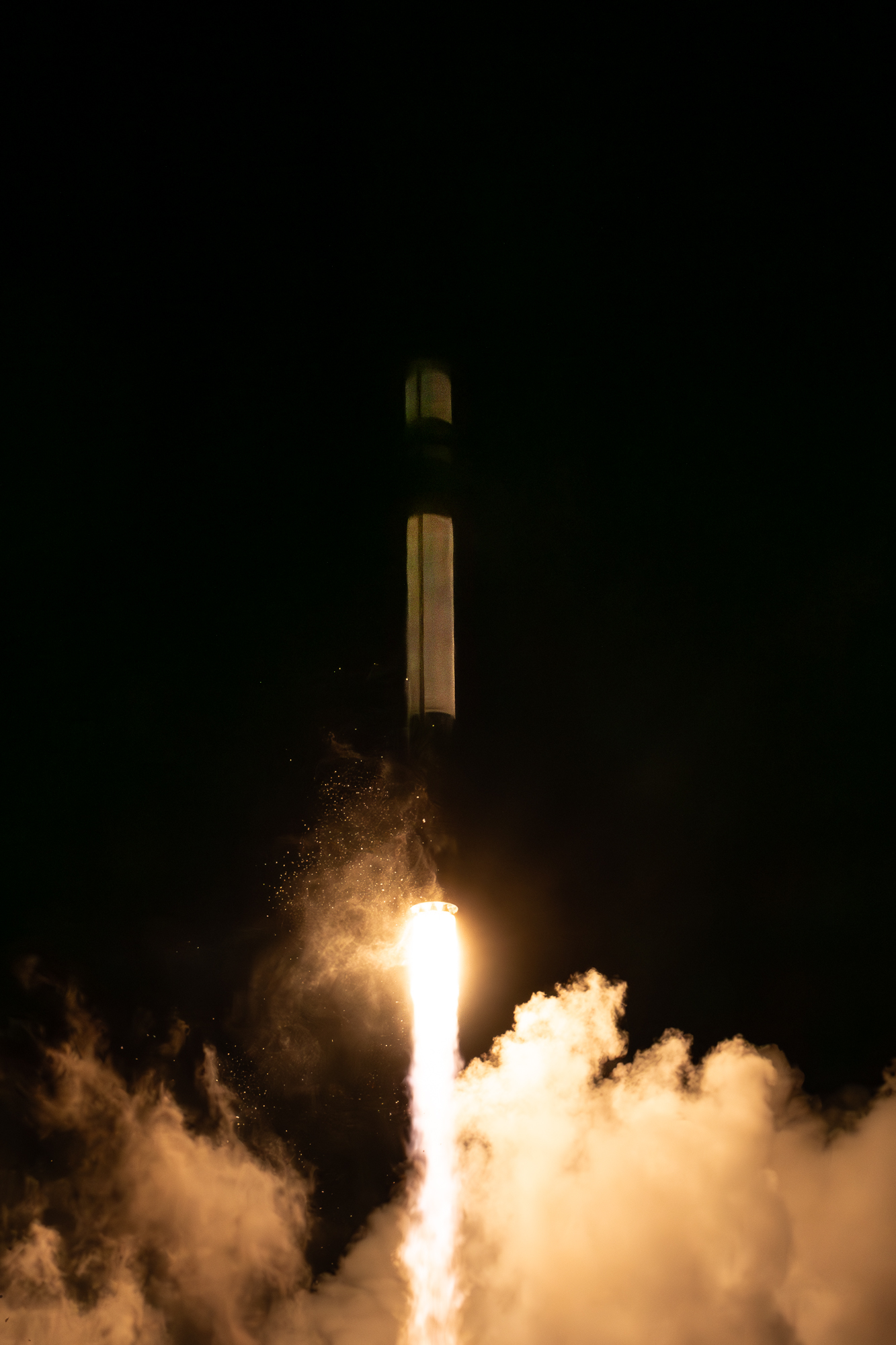
Electron during launch of PREFIRE-1

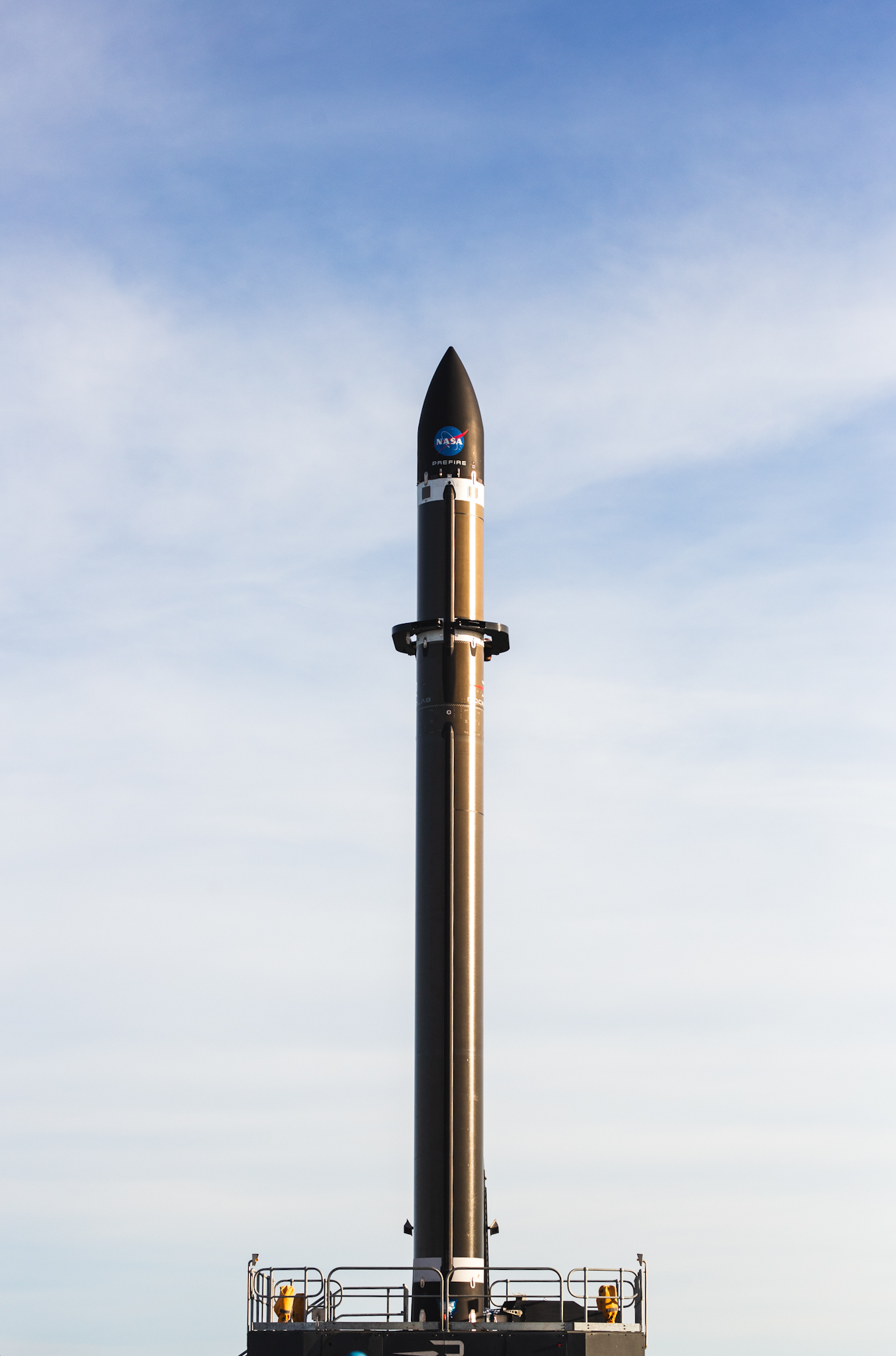
Electron at pad before launch of PREFIRE-2

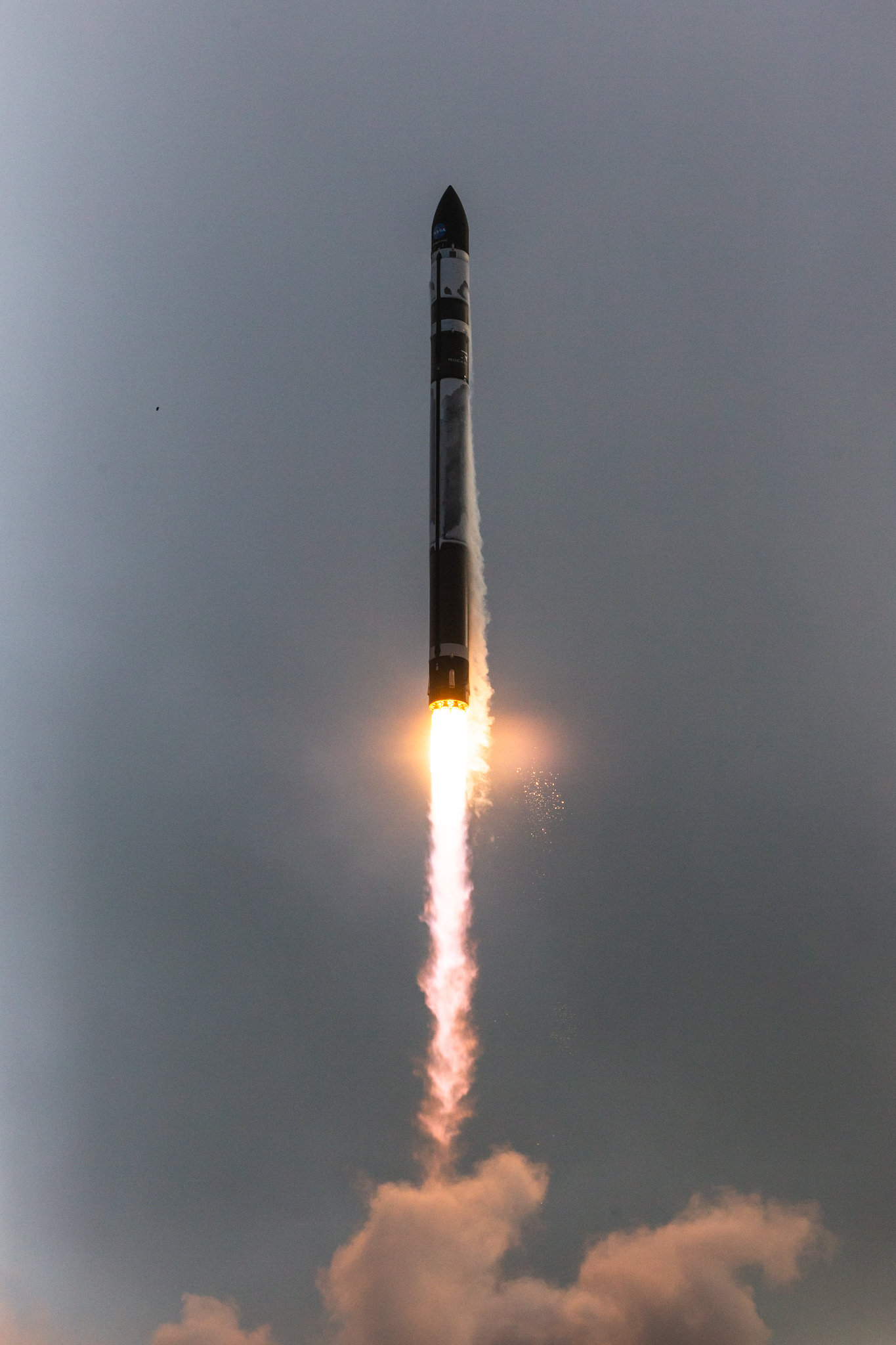
Electron during launch of PREFIRE-2
