= Capella Space =

American space company

- Type: Subsidiary
- Industry: Earth Observation
- Founded: March 2016; 10 years ago
- Founders: Payam Banazadeh; Will Woods
- Headquarters: San Francisco, California, United States
- Area served: Worldwide
- Products: High-Resolution (0.25m) SAR satellite Imagery and geospatial solutions End-to-end mission solutions
- Parent: IonQ
- Website: capellaspace.com

Capella Space is an American satellite manufacturer and operator. Capella was founded in 2016 and in 2020 launched the first American synthetic-aperture radar satellite. Capella is headquartered in San Francisco, California.

In July 2025, Capella was acquired by quantum computing company IonQ.

== History ==
The company was founded in 2016 by Payam Banazadeh, a former engineer at Jet Propulsion Laboratory of NASA, and William Walter Woods. Capella initially received funding from the Defense Innovation Unit. As of January 2024, the company had more than 200 employees and raised venture capital from investors such as Canaan Partners, Data Collective, Pear VC, and Spark Capital.

Capella designs, manufactures and operates its fleet of SAR satellites to provide high-resolution, all-weather imagery to the U.S. government and commercial customers. Sequoia, the first-generation satellite, launched in August 2020. Six second-generation Whitney satellites were launched between January 2021 and January 2022 on SpaceX Transporter rideshare missions into a polar Sun-synchronous orbit.

Capella Space has raised about $250 million in total equity and debt financing since its founding in 2016. In May 2025, IonQ, a quantum computing startup, announced their intent to purchase Capella Space in an all stocks transaction. The acquisition was completed in July 2025.

== Contracts ==
In 2019, the National Reconnaissance Office (NRO) awarded Capella a contract to study the integration of Capella's commercial radar imagery with the NRO's government-owned surveillance satellites. The U.S. Air Force awarded Capella a contract in November 2019 to incorporate the company's imagery into the Air Force's virtual reality software. Capella also has a contract with the Navy, and the National Geospatial-Intelligence Agency signed a Cooperative Research and Development Agreement (CRADA), earlier in 2020 to allow researchers from the U.S. government's intelligence community to assist Capella. An inter-satellite link with Inmarsat's network of geostationary communications satellites enables real-time tasking of Capella's satellites. Customers can use a self-service electronic portal and API to task a Capella satellite for a radar image. In 2021, Capella received a $3 million research contract in support of the Space Development Agency's National Defense Space Architecture. Capella was chosen through a broad agency announcement.

In 2023, Capella was awarded a Proliferated Low Earth Orbit Satellite-Based Services (PLEO) contract through the U.S. Space Systems Command (SSC) to support SSC and the U.S. Space Force with access to SAR imagery for key missions. Capella was also awarded two Commercial Satellite Data Acquisition (CSDA) contracts with NASA to determine the suitability of Capella's data to advance NASA's Earth science missions: a multi-year blanket purchase agreement and an indefinite-delivery, indefinite-quantity, multiple-award contract. This enables NASA research evaluators from across the country with easy access to Capella's high-resolution data archive and automated tasking capabilities as they find novel new ways to monitor the Earth and the environment.

In 2024, Capella was awarded $15 million by the U.S. Air Force to develop a next-generation SAR sensor and received an award from the Space Development Agency to participate in the HALO contracting vehicle.

In partnership with Pacific Geomatics, Capella imagery is available to government offices across Canada through Canada's National Master Standing Offers. Canadian officials have easy access to Capella's high-quality imagery and automated tasking capabilities for a variety of use cases including monitoring natural resources, mining operations, ice flows, maritime activity and more.

== Satellites ==
=== Sequoia satellite ===
The Sequoia Earth-imaging satellite was originally supposed to launch as a secondary payload on the Indian rocket Polar Satellite Launch Vehicle (PSLV) in late 2019, but the mission was postponed, prompting Capella to move the satellite to a Falcon 9 rocket of SpaceX, according to Payam Banazadeh. It was booked to fly as a rideshare passenger on the Falcon 9 launch with Argentina's SAOCOM 1B radar observation satellite in late March 2020. But that launch was also delayed at the request of Argentine's space agency (CONAE) as travel and work restrictions were implemented at the onset of the COVID-19 pandemic. That left Capella looking for another ride for Sequoia.

Capella had previously signed a contract with Rocket Lab for a dedicated launch for a future satellite, and Banazadeh said the company decided instead to put Sequoia on the Rocket Lab mission. Rocket Lab encountered delays after an Electron launch failed on 4 July 2020. Meanwhile, SAOCOM 1B launch preparations resumed and the Argentina satellite lifted off earlier on 30 August 2020 at 23:18:00 UTC, hours before the Rocket Lab mission with Sequoia, on 31 August 2020 at 03:05:47 UTC. The Electron launcher delivered Sequoia to a 525 km orbit, inclined 45.0°. Sequoia has a launch weight of 100 kg.

=== Whitney satellites ===
Six Whitney satellites were originally planned. The first two (Capella-3 and Capella-4) were launched on the Falcon 9 Transporter-1 rideshare mission to a Sun-synchronous orbit on 24 January 2021.

Capella-6 (Whitney-4) was launched as a rideshare on Starlink V1.0 L26 on 15 May 2021.

Capella-5 (Whitney-3) was launched as a rideshare on the mission Transporter-2 on 30 June 2021.

Capella-7 and Capella-8 were launched as a rideshare on the mission Transporter-3 on 13 January 2022.

Capella-9 (Whitney-7) and Capella-10 (Whitney-8), two additional satellites in this series, to be launched no earlier than 10 January 2023.

=== Acadia satellites ===
In August 2022 the company announced the development of a new generation of SAR satellites, called "Acadia". These new satellites represent an improvement from Capella's previous satellite generations with increased radar bandwidth from 500 MHz to 700 MHz, able to provide better resolution, higher imaging quality and shorter times between customer orders and delivery. They are compatible to be equipped with optical communication terminals (OCTs). Capella Space was the first commercial SAR company to demonstrate Optical Inter-Satellite Links. In early 2023, Capella announced a multi-launch agreement with Rocket Lab for four dedicated launches, including a launch of Capella's first Acadia satellite. The launch of the first satellite took place on 23 August 2023 at 23:45 UTC.

List of satellites
Name	Capella-1	Capella-2	Capella-3	Capella-4	Capella-5	Capella-6	Capella-7	Capella-8	Capella-9	Capella-10
Name	Denali	Sequoia	Whitney-1	Whitney-2	Whitney-3	Whitney-4	Whitney-5	Whitney-6	Whitney-7	Whitney-8
Launch date	3 Dec 2018	31 Aug 2020	24 Jan 2021	24 Jan 2021	30 Jun 2021	15 May 2021	13 Jan 2022	13 Jan 2022	16 Mar 2023	16 Mar 2023
Launch Vehicle	Falcon 9 B5	Electron	Falcon 9 B5	Falcon 9 B5	Falcon 9 B5	Falcon 9 B5	Falcon 9 B5	Falcon 9 B5	Electron	Electron
Inclination (degrees)	97.7	45.1	97.5	97.4	97.5	53.0	97.5	97.5	44.0	44.0
Decay date	25 Jan 2023	28 Feb 2023	26 Feb 2023	8 Apr 2023	23 Feb 2023	29 Mar 2024	26 Aug 2023	6 Sept 2023	29 Mar 2025	5 May 2025

List of satellites
Name	Capella-11	Capella-12	Capella-13	Capella-14	Capella-15	Capella-16	Capella-17	Capella-18	Capella-19	Capella-20
Name	Acadia-1	Acadia-2	Acadia-3	Acadia-4	Acadia-5	Acadia-6	Acadia-7	Acadia-8	Acadia-9	Acadia-10
Launch date	23 Aug 2023	19 Sep 2023	11 August 2024	7 April 2024	16 August 2024	26 Aug 2025	23 June 2025	11 January 2026	11 January 2026	30 March 2026
Launch Vehicle	Electron	Electron	Electron	Falcon 9	Falcon 9	Falcon 9	Falcon 9	Falcon 9	Falcon 9	Falcon 9
Inclination (degrees)	53.0	Launch failure	53.0	45.4	97.0	97.0	97.5	97.8	97.8	97.77
Decay date		Launch failure								

== See also ==
- Earth observation satellite
- COSMO-SkyMed
- ICEYE
- iQPS
- Planet Labs
- RADARSAT
- TerraSAR-X
