= Synspective =

Japanese private space company

- Traded as: TYO: 290A
- Industry: Aerospace
- Founded: 2018; 8 years ago
- Headquarters: Tokyo, Japan
- Number of employees: 200 (2024)
- Website: synspective.com

Synspective is a publicly traded space company formed in 2018 in Tokyo, Japan. The company specializes in synthetic aperture radar satellites, and operates a constellation of these satellites for advanced earth imaging.

== History ==
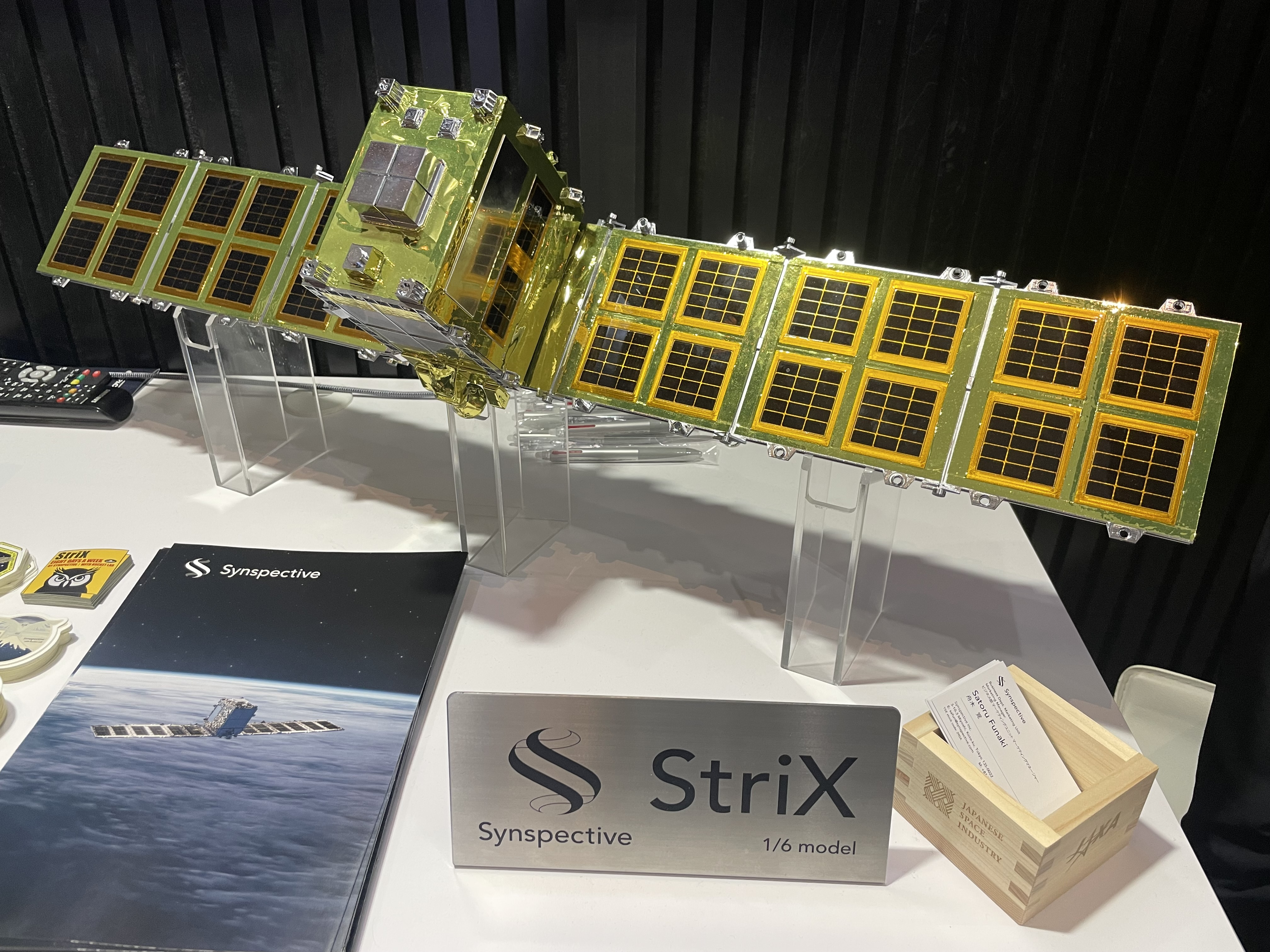
1/6 scale model of a StriX satellite.

The company was formed in Japan in 2018. The company in its early years was funded by private investors. The first satellite by the company entered operation in 2020. In 2024, the company signed a deal with Rocket Lab for 10 launches of the Electron rocket for a synthetic aperture radar satellite constellation named StriX.

In 2026, Synspective signed an agreement with Rocket Lab for 20 additional dedicated Electron launches, scheduled between 2028 and 2031, to deploy satellites for its StriX synthetic aperture radar constellation. Rocket Lab described the agreement as its largest commercial Electron launch contract to date.
