= Rocket Lab Launch Complex 1 =

Commercial spaceport in New Zealand

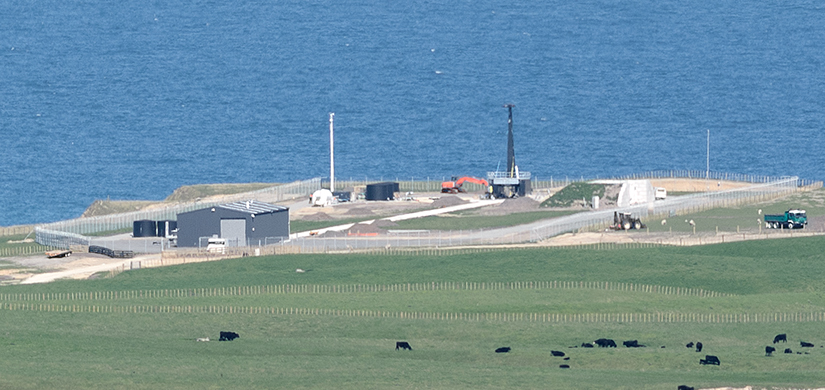
- Launch Complex 1 on Māhia Peninsula
- Interactive map of Rocket Lab Launch Complex 1
- Location: Māhia Peninsula, New Zealand
- Coordinates: 39.26085°S 177.86586°E
- Time zone: UTC+12 (NZST)
  - Summer (DST): UTC+13 (NZDT (Note: Summer time is active from the last Sunday in September until the first Sunday in April.))
- Operator: Rocket Lab
- Total launches: 87
- Launch pad: 2
LC-1A launch history
- Status: Active
- Launches: 46
- First launch: 25 May 2017; Electron ("It's a Test")
- Last launch: 14 November 2026; Electron ("The Mountain God Rises")
- Associated rockets: Electron
LC-1B launch history
- Status: Active
- Launches: 41
- First launch: 28 February 2022; Electron ("The Owl's Night Continues")
- Last launch: 26 September 2026; Electron ("Owlright, Owlright, Owlright")
- Associated rockets: Electron

Rocket Lab Launch Complex 1 (also known as Māhia Launch Complex or Spaceport) is a commercial spaceport located close to Ahuriri Point at the southern tip of Māhia Peninsula, on the east coast of New Zealand's North Island. It is owned and operated by private spaceflight company Rocket Lab and supports launches of the company's Electron rocket for small satellites. The facility officially opened on 26 September 2016 (UTC). With the launch of Electron on 25 May 2017, it became the first private spaceport to conduct an orbital launch attempt and the first site in New Zealand to host such an attempt. With the Electron launch of 21 January 2018, it became the first private spaceport to host a successful orbital launch.

== Location ==
The spaceport is located close to Ahuriri Point at the southern tip of New Zealand's Māhia Peninsula, in the Hawke's Bay Region of the North Island's east coast. The site is a raised plateau surrounded on three sides by cliffs, and at an altitude of 104 metres (341 ft). The only road access is a single road leading north from the site. This crosses the isthmus connecting the peninsula with the rest of the North Island before connecting with SH 2 at the settlement of Nūhaka. The nearest town, Wairoa, lies 50 kilometres (31 mi) to the northwest of the launch site, around the curve of Hawke Bay.

== Description ==
Launch Complex 1 features a 50-tonne (49-long-ton; 55-short-ton) launch platform and tower, a hangar for the Electron rockets, and storage tanks for liquid oxygen and kerosene. During the test phase of launch operations, which began in May 2017, the exclusion zone was expected to be an eight-kilometre (five-mile) radius from the pad that was predicted to reduce in size once the site became commercially operational.

== History ==
=== Site options ===
Rocket Lab announced on 1 July 2015 that it had selected Kaitorete Spit in New Zealand's South Island near Canterbury as the site of the launch facility for its Electron rocket, and that it hoped to have construction finished by the end of the year. While the site would not permit equatorial launches due to the presence of Banks Peninsula to the east, it was favourable for Sun-synchronous orbital flights, which the company believed would be of primary interest to its customers. The site was also logistically favourable as the company wanted to build a rocket production facility in nearby Christchurch.

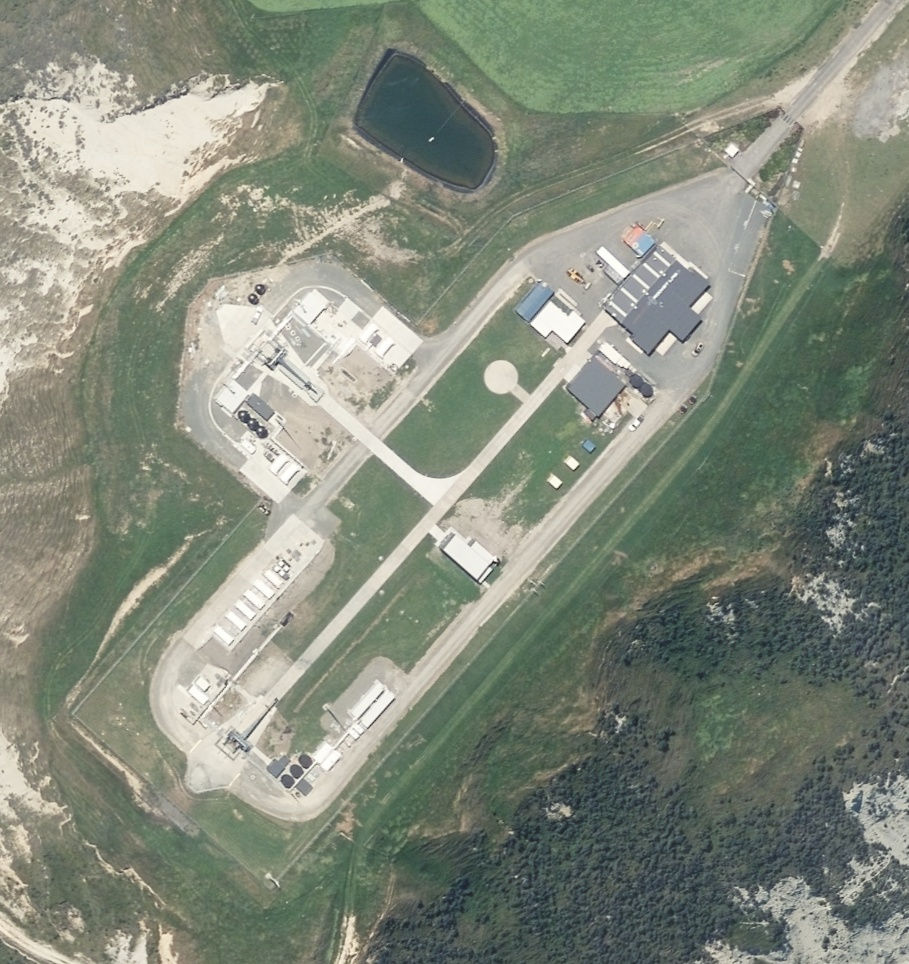
Aerial photo of Rocket Lab Launch Complex 1, 2022

The Māhia Peninsula site at Onenui Station was mentioned in August 2015 as a possible second launch facility. It had first been visited by company officials in April 2015 as part of their initial scouting for launch sites, and were preparing to submit a resource consent application. By mid-October, the application had been approved by the Wairoa District Council and Hawke's Bay Regional Council only seven days after its submission, with the Gisborne Chamber of Commerce and the Eastland Community Trust working with Rocket Lab to support its bid for the Mahia site.

=== Decision for Mahia ===
On 23 November 2015, Rocket Lab stated that the Māhia Peninsula site would be the priority launch facility because of delays in obtaining resource consents for developing at Kaitorete Spit.

While certain authorisations had been obtained for Kaitorete, such as stormwater and air discharge permits from Environment Canterbury, a coastal permit for occupation of the area, and a Department of Conservation permit, the Christchurch City Council had not consented to the development due to an incomplete Cultural Impact Assessment, resulting in no action under Sections 95 and 104 of the Resource Management Act 1991. The company said that efforts would continue to gain consent for a launch pad on Kaitorete Spit due to its logistical superiority and the foreseen need for additional facilities, but that the Mahia site offered superior launch corridor and flight rate opportunities because of its geographical location and relatively sparse air traffic. A license was granted for the Mahia site with a maximum launch rate of once every 72 hours over a period of 30 years, while the Kaitorete site would only have been licensed to launch once per month.

The company broke ground at Mahia in December 2015, and by June 2016 most of the infrastructure work had been completed, including upgrades to roads and internet services, and work was progressing on the electrical, mechanical and communications infrastructure. Rocket Lab signed an agreement with air traffic service provider Airways New Zealand in early September 2016 to develop "special use airspace."

The Māhia Peninsula site, named Rocket Lab Launch Complex 1, was officially opened on 26 September 2016 (UTC) in a ceremony presided over by Minister for Economic Development Steven Joyce. It was attended by approximately 240 people, including company employees, local landowners, and then Labour Party leader Andrew Little.

=== Launch history ===
==== Pad A ====
On Pad A or LC-1A (at 39.261515237910196°S 177.86521705520965°E) Rocket Lab carried out the first test flight of its Electron rocket, named "It's a Test", on 25 May 2017 at 04:20 UTC, coming after three delays caused by bad weather during a launch window that extended from 21 May to 1 June. While lift-off from Launch Complex 1 was successful, the rocket failed to reach its intended 300 to 500 km (190 to 310 mi) Sun-synchronous orbit, only making it to about 250 km (155 mi).

The second launch from the launch pad was made 21 January 2018 at 01:43 UTC, successfully making it to orbit. The Electron rocket, named "Still Testing", carried a Dove Pioneer satellite for Planet Labs, two Lemur-2 satellites for Spire Global and the Humanity Star.

==== Pad B ====
On 19 December 2019, Rocket Lab announced that they had begun construction on a second pad at LC-1, known as LC-1B (at 39.2605032684272°S 177.8653779163029°E) to meet increased launch rates. As of April 2020, the construction was expected to be completed by the end of 2020. It was used for the first time to launch the mission "The Owl's Night Continues" for Synspective on 28 February 2022.

== See also ==
- Rocket Lab Launch Complex 2, a launch complex in the East Coast of USA for the Electron rocket
- Rocket Lab Launch Complex 3, a launch complex in the East Coast of USA for the Neutron rocket
