= Rocket Lab Electron =

Two-stage small launch vehicle, 200-300 kg to LEO

Electron

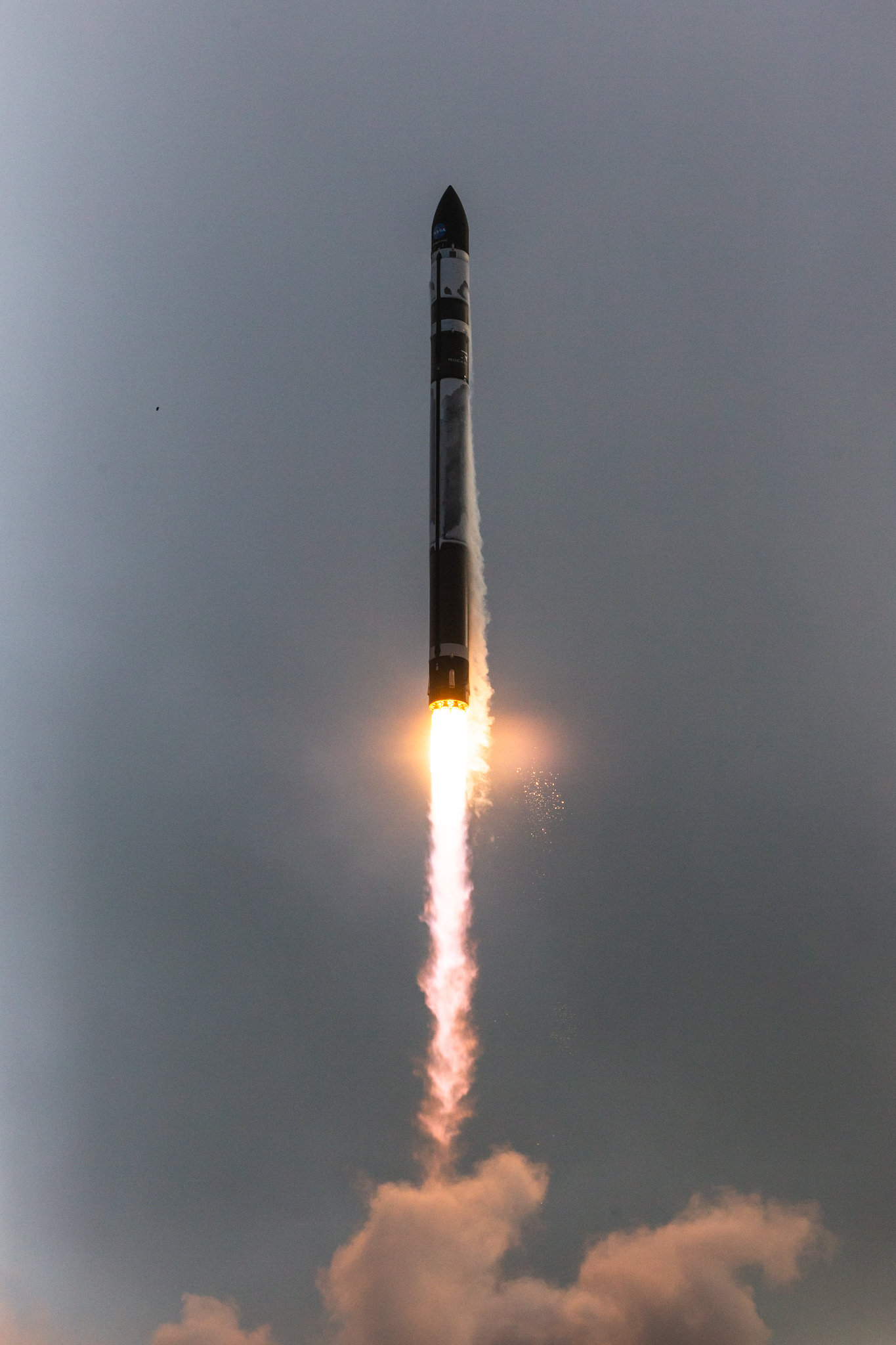
- Electron during launch of PREFIRE
- Function: Small-lift launch vehicle
- Manufacturer: Rocket Lab
- Country of origin: New Zealand; United States
- Project cost: US$100 million
- Cost per launch: About US$7.5 million

Size
- Height: 18 m (59 ft)
- Diameter: 1.2 m (3 ft 11 in)
- Mass: 13.0 t (28,700 lb)
- Stages: 2–3

Capacity

Payload to LEO
- Mass: Original: 225 kg (496 lb); Updated: 300 kg (660 lb)

Payload to SSO
- Mass: Original: 150 kg (330 lb); Updated: 200 kg (440 lb)

Associated rockets
- Comparable: Agnibaan; Ceres-1; Kuaizhou 1; Long March 11; Minotaur I; Shavit 2; SSLV; Vikram-I

Launch history
- Status: Active
- Launch sites: Māhia, LC-1A & 1B; MARS, LC-2
- Total launches: 100 (Note: Including suborbital flights of the HASTE program.)
- Success(es): 96
- Failure: 4
- First flight: 25 May 2017
- Last flight: 14 November 2026

First stage
- Height: 12.1 m (40 ft)
- Diameter: 1.2 m (3 ft 11 in)
- Powered by: 9 × Rutherford
- Maximum thrust: SL: 224.3 kN (50,400 lb_{f}) vac: 234 kN (53,000 lb_{f})
- Specific impulse: 311 s (3.05 km/s)
- Propellant: RP-1/LOX

Second stage
- Height: 2.4 m (7 ft 10 in)
- Diameter: 1.2 m (3 ft 11 in)
- Powered by: 1 × Rutherford
- Maximum thrust: 25.8 kN (5,800 lb_{f})
- Specific impulse: 343 s (3.36 km/s)
- Propellant: RP-1/LOX

Kick stage (optional) – Photon
- Powered by: 1 × Curie
- Maximum thrust: 0.12 kN (27 lb_{f})
- Propellant: Viscous liquid monopropellant (AP, Al, Polydimethylsiloxane)

Kick stage (optional) – Photon (modified)
- Powered by: 1 × HyperCurie
- Maximum thrust: 0.4 kN (90 lb_{f})
- Specific impulse: 310 s (3.0 km/s)
- Propellant: unspecified hypergolic bi-propellant

Electron is a two-stage, expendable orbital launch vehicle developed by Rocket Lab, a publicly traded aerospace manufacturer and launch service provider. Servicing the commercial small satellite launch market, it is the third most launched small-lift launch vehicle in history. Its Rutherford engines are the first electric-pump-fed engine to power an orbital-class rocket. Electron is often flown with a kickstage or Rocket Lab's Photon spacecraft. Although the rocket was designed to be expendable, Rocket Lab has recovered the first stage twice and is working towards the capability of reusing the booster. The Flight 26 (F26) booster has featured the first helicopter catch recovery attempt. Rocket Lab has, however, abandoned the idea of catching Electron.

In December 2016, Electron completed flight qualification. The first rocket was launched on 25 May 2017, reaching space but not achieving orbit due to a glitch in communication equipment on the ground. During its second flight on 21 January 2018, Electron reached orbit and deployed three CubeSats. The first commercial launch of Electron, and the third launch overall, occurred on 11 November 2018. Since then, Electron has launched successfully 96 times, with an additional 4 failures, for a total of 100 launches.

== Design ==
Electron uses two stages with the same diameter (1.2 m (3 ft 11 in)) filled with RP-1/LOX propellant. The main body of the rocket is constructed using a lightweight carbon composite material.

Both stages use the Rutherford rocket engine, the first electric-pump-fed engine to power an orbital rocket. The electric pumps are powered by lithium-polymer batteries. The second stage uses three batteries which are "hot swapped", two of the batteries are jettisoned once depleted to shed mass. There are nine Rutherford engines on the first stage and one vacuum-optimized version on the second stage. The first stage engines deliver 162 kN (36,000 lb_{f}) of thrust and the second stage delivers 22 kN (4,900 lb_{f}) of thrust. Almost all of the engines' parts are 3D printed to save time and money in the manufacturing process.

Rocket Lab has also developed an optional third stage, known as the "kick stage", designed to circularize the orbits of its satellite payloads. The Electron kick stage is equipped with a single Curie engine that is capable of performing multiple burns, uses an unspecified "green" bipropellant, and is 3D printed. It was first used during Electron's second flight. The kick stage can transport up to 150 kg (330 lb) of payload.

Rocket Lab has also developed a derivative spacecraft of the kick stage, Photon, which is intended for use on lunar and interplanetary missions. Photon will be capable of delivering small payloads of up to 30 kg (66 lb) into lunar orbit.

The Electron payload Fairing is 2.5 m (8 feet and 2.4 inches) in length with a 1.2 m (3 feet and 11.2 inches) diameter and a total mass of 44 kg (97 lbm).

=== Production ===
Manufacturing the carbon composite components of the main flight structure has traditionally required 400 hours, with extensive hand labor in the process. In late 2019, Rocket Lab brought a new robotic manufacturing capability online to produce all composite parts for an Electron in just 12 hours. The robot was nicknamed "Rosie the Robot", after The Jetsons character. The process can make all the carbon fiber structures as well as handle cutting, drilling, and sanding such that the parts are ready for final assembly. The company objective as of November 2019 is to reduce the overall Electron manufacturing cycle to just seven days.

Rutherford engine production makes extensive use of additive manufacturing and has since the earliest flights of Electron. This allows the capability to scale production in a relatively straightforward manner by increasing the number and capability of 3D printers.

=== Reusability ===
Rocket Lab's Electron return phases

On 6 August 2019, Rocket Lab announced recovery and reflight plans for the first stage of Electron, although plans had started internally from late 2018. Electron was not originally designed to be a reusable launch vehicle as it is a small-lift launch vehicle but was pursued due to increased understanding of Electron's performance based on analysis of previous flights through sensors on the vehicle. In addition, reusability was pursued to meet launch demands. To counteract decreased payload capacity caused by the added mass of recovery hardware, performance improvements to Electrons are expected.

Early phases of recovery included data gathering and surviving atmospheric reentry also known as "The Wall". The next phase will require a successful deployment of an aerodynamic decelerator or ballute to slow the booster followed by the deployment of parafoil concluded by a touchdown in the ocean. After a successful touchdown in the ocean, the stage would be moved onto a ship for refurbishment and reflight. Rocket Lab has not released information on aerodynamic decelerator that would be required to slow down the booster after atmospheric reentry. Late phases of Electron reuse would involve using a parafoil and mid-air retrieval by a helicopter. After a successful mid-air retrieval the helicopter would bring the Electron to a ship that would bring the stage to the launch site for refurbishment and launch. Later, Rocket Lab abandoned the plan to catch the stage with a helicopter, and will use ocean landing instead. One recovered Rutherford engine passed five full-duration hot fire tests and is declared ready to fly again. Rocket Lab's 40th Electron mission successfully reused a refurbished Rutherford engine from a previous flight.

==== Aerothermal decelerator ====
Rocket Lab, while investigating reusability, decided that they will not pursue propulsive recovery like SpaceX. Instead they will use the atmosphere to slow down the booster in what is known as "aerothermal decelerator" technology. The exact methods used are proprietary but may include keeping proper orientation when reentering the atmosphere and other technologies.

=== Vehicle modification history ===
The Electron initially had a payload capacity of 150–225 kg (331–496 lb) to a 500 km (310 mi) Sun-synchronous orbit.

In pursuit of reusability, Rocket Lab has made changes to Electron. Flight 6 and 7 ("That's a Funny Looking Cactus" and "Make it Rain") had instruments on the first stage needed to gather data to help with the reflight program. Flight 8 ("Look Ma No Hands") had Brutus, an instrument that collected data from the first stage to study reentry and was designed to be able to survive splashdown in the ocean.

Flight 10 ("Running out of Fingers") had a block update to the first stage of the Electron to allow the first guided reentry of the first stage booster. Updates included additional hardware for guidance and navigation; onboard flight computers; and S-Band telemetry to both gather and livestream data gathered during reentry. The first stage also had a reaction control system (RCS) to orient the booster. After stage separation, the first stage using the new hardware installed flipped 180° to prepare for reentry. Throughout the reentry the stage was guided through the atmosphere such that it has the right orientation and angle of attack for the base heat shield to protect the booster from destruction using RCS and onboard computers. The booster successfully survived its guided re-entry despite having no deceleration hardware onboard and destructively splashed down into the ocean at 900 km/h (250 m/s; 560 mph) as planned if reentry was successful. Rocket Lab had no plans to recover the stage and instead wanted to demonstrate the ability to successfully reenter. Flight 11 ("Birds of a Feather") demonstrated similar success. No further atmospheric reentry tests similar to flight 10 and 11 are expected.

Following Flight 11 ("Birds of a Feather"), in mid-February 2020, low altitude tests were done to test parachutes. In April 2020, Rocket Lab shared the successful demonstration of mid-air retrieval done in March 2020. An Electron test article was dropped by a helicopter and deployed its parachutes. A helicopter carrying a long-boom snagged a drogue line from the parachute at 1,500 m (4,900 ft) demonstrating a successful retrieval. Following the catch the test article was brought back to land.

Flight 16 ("Return to Sender"), was the first to recover the first stage booster, with a splashdown into the Pacific Ocean. The rocket also lofted thirty payloads into Sun-synchronous orbit, including a titanium mass simulator in the shape of the garden gnome "Gnome Chompski" from the video game Half-Life 2.

In August 2020, Rocket Lab announced increased payload of Electron to 225–300 kg (496–661 lb). The payload capacity increase was mainly due to battery advancements. The increased payload capacity allows offset of mass added by recovery technology. In addition, more payload mass could be flown on interplanetary missions and others when Electron is expended.

==== Fairings ====
Rocket Lab also announced several custom fairings, including an expanded fairing (1.2x standard), a normal expanded fairing, an extended fairing and a dual stack fairing. The standard fairing has a usable diameter of 1.07 m (3,51 ft) while an expanded fairing has a diameter of 1.56 m (5.12 ft). The StriX-α mission for Synspective in December 2020 used an extended fairing.

==== Autonomous flight termination systems ====
Rocket Lab developed their own AFTS for launches from New Zealand from Dec 2019, but for the first launch from US they used the NASA Autonomous Flight Termination Unit.

== Applications ==
Electron is designed to launch a 200–300 kg (440–660 lb) payload to a 500 km (310 mi) Sun-synchronous orbit, suitable for CubeSats and other small payloads. In October 2018, Rocket Lab opened a factory large enough to produce more than 50 rockets per year according to the company. Customers may choose to encapsulate their spacecraft in payload fairings provided by the company, which can be easily attached to the rocket shortly before launch. The starting price for delivering payloads to orbit is about US$7.5 million per launch, or US$25,000 per kg, which offers the only dedicated service at this price point.

Moon Express contracted Rocket Lab to launch lunar landers (multiple launches contracted, some planned for Moon Express operations after GLXP) on an Electron to compete for the Google Lunar X Prize (GLXP). None of the contenders met the prize deadline, and the competition was closed without a winner. For sometime after the closure of GLXP, the Moon Express Electron launches remained scheduled, but before February 2020, all the launches of Moon Express using Electron were canceled.

=== Suborbital launches ===
In April 2023, Rocket Lab announced an Electron derivative vehicle named HASTE (Hypersonic Accelerator Suborbital Test Electron) capable of delivering 700 kg on a suborbital trajectory. Customers include Dynetics, who is using the rocket to launch test vehicles under the MACH-TB program. The first launch, DYNAMO-A, occurred on June 18, 2023, from Launch Complex-2 (LP-0C) in the Mid-Atlantic Regional Spaceport.

== Launch sites ==
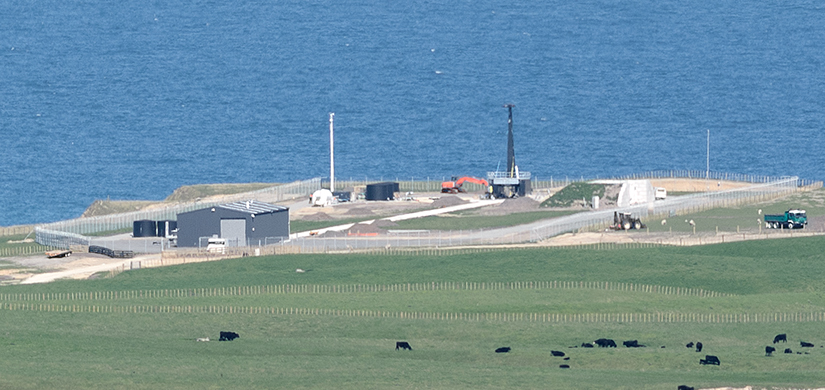
The Māhia launch site under construction in 2016

The rocket is launched from Rocket Lab Launch Complex 1 on Māhia Peninsula, New Zealand. The launch pad's remote and sparsely populated location is intended to enable a high frequency of launches. The rocket and launch pad were both privately funded, the first time all parts of an orbital launch operation were entirely run by the private sector (other private spaceflight companies lease launch facilities from government agencies or only launch suborbital rockets).

In October 2018, Rocket Lab selected Virginia Space's Mid-Atlantic Regional Spaceport (MARS) at the Wallops Flight Facility, Virginia, as its future secondary launch site in the United States, called Rocket Lab Launch Complex 2. Launch Complex 2 (LC-2) is expected to serve government customers.

The first launch from LC-2 happened on 24 January 2023. An Electron rocket successfully orbited 3 satellites.

Additionally, the UK Space Agency is giving Highlands and Islands Enterprise the opportunity to develop an Electron launch pad on the A' Mhòine Peninsula in Sutherland, Scotland. The location would be named Sutherland spaceport.

On the 27th of July Rocket lab announced a new launch site launch complex 4 (LC-4) had been built at the Pacific spaceport complex in Alaska, this happened along side a 226-million-dollar missile defence contract with the US space force

== Launch history ==
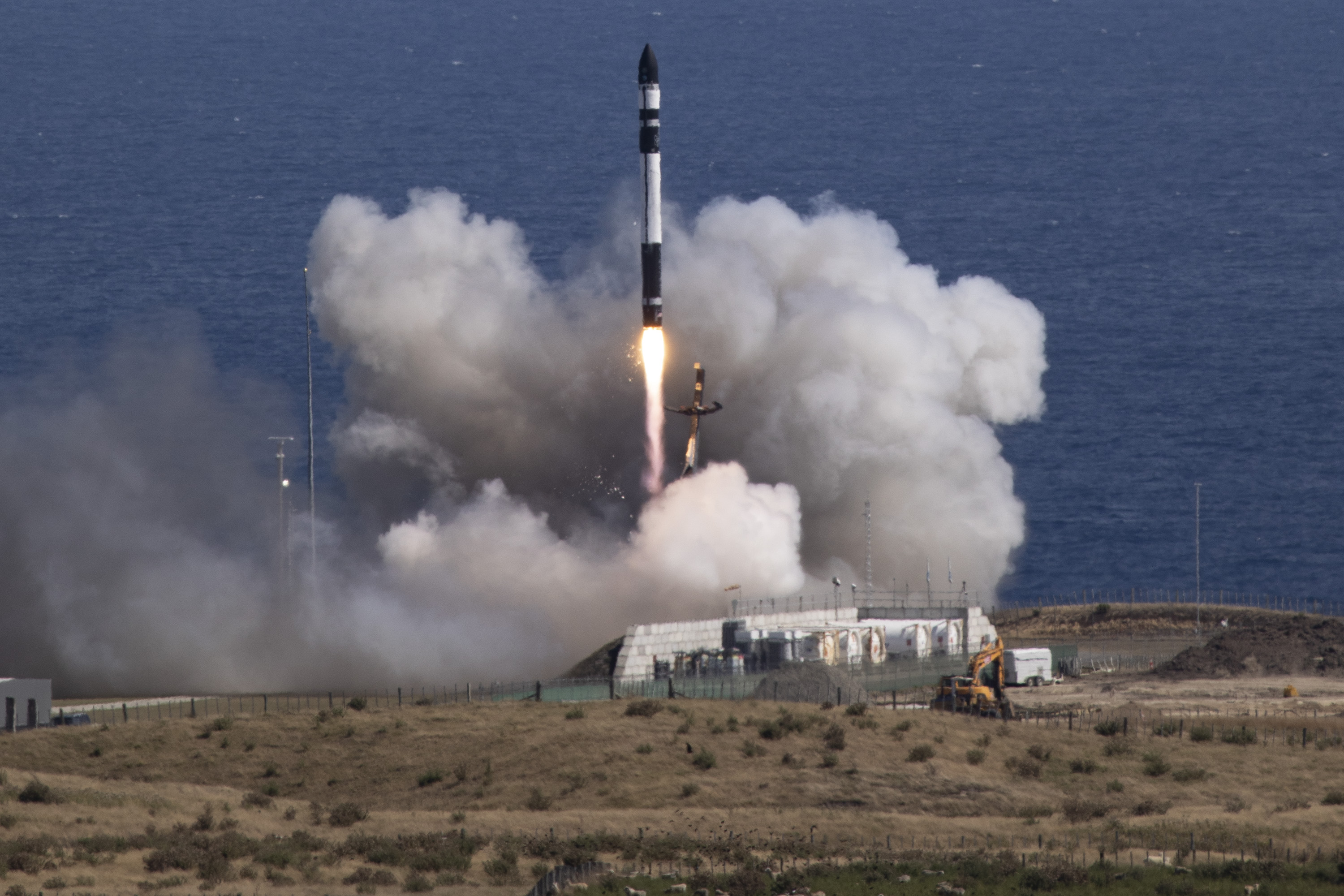
A National Reconnaissance Office (NRO) payload was successfully launched aboard a Rocket Lab Electron rocket from Launch Complex-1

The Electron has flown 100 times since May 2017, with a total of 96 successes and 4 failures, Including 9 suborbital flight from the HASTE program. The initial test flight, called "It's a Test", failed due to a glitch in communication equipment on the ground, but the follow-up missions, called "Still Testing", "It's Business Time" and "This One's For Pickering", delivered multiple small payloads to low Earth orbit. In August 2019, a mission named "Look Ma, No Hands" successfully delivered four satellites to orbit, and in October 2019, the mission named "As the Crow Flies" successfully launched from Māhia LC-1, deploying a small satellite and its kick stage into a 400 km parking orbit. In July 2020, the thirteenth Electron rocket launch failed with customer payloads on board, the first failure after the maiden flight. In May 2021, the twentieth launch also failed.

=== Notable launches ===
- "Still Testing", Electron's first successful launch
- ELaNa-19 "This One's For Pickering", Electron's first NASA-sponsored launch
- NROL-151, "Birds of a Feather", Electron's first NRO-sponsored launch
- "Return to Sender", Electron's first ocean recovery of the first stage
- "It's a little Chile up here", Electron's first launch of the Space Test Program.
- CAPSTONE, Electron's first launch to the Moon.
- HawkEye 360 Cluster 6, "Virginia is for Launch Lovers", Electron's first launch from Launch Complex 2 at the Mid-Atlantic Regional Spaceport.

=== Launch outcomes ===
- Orbital Failure
- Orbital Success
- Sub-orbital Failure
- Sub-orbital Success
- Scheduled Orbital Missions
- Scheduled Sub-Orbital Missions

=== Launch sites ===
- Mahia LC-1A
- Mahia LC-1B
- MARS LC-2

=== Booster tests and recoveries ===
- No Attempt
- Atmospheric Test Success
- Ocean Recovery Success
- Aerial Capture Partial Failure

=== Rocket configurations ===
- Block 1
- Block upgrade (Recovery Hardware)
- HASTE (Sub-Orbital)

== See also ==
- List of Electron launches
- Comparison of orbital launcher families
- Comparison of orbital launch systems
- Small-lift launch vehicle – Rocket able to lift less than 2,000 kg to low Earth orbit
- Falcon 1 – Expendable launch system by SpaceX
- Firefly Alpha – Two-stage small satellite launch rocket
- Miura 5 – European orbital recoverable rocket of the company PLD Space
- Vector-R – Two stage Launch vehicle, 60 kg payload to LEO
