= History of spaceflight =

Spaceflight began in the 20th century following theoretical and practical breakthroughs by Konstantin Tsiolkovsky, Robert H. Goddard, and Hermann Oberth, each of whom published works proposing rockets as the means for spaceflight. (Note: Tsiolkovsky, 1903, Exploration of Outer Space by Means of Rocket Devices; Goddard, 1919, A Method of Reaching Extreme Altitudes; Oberth, 1923, Die Rakete zu den Planetenräumen) The first successful large-scale rocket programs were initiated in Nazi Germany by Wernher von Braun. The Soviet Union took the lead in the early post-war Space Race, launching the first satellite, the first animal, the first human and the first woman into orbit. The United States landed the first men on the Moon in 1969. Through the late 20th century, France, the United Kingdom, Japan, and China were also working on projects to reach space.

Following the end of the Space Race, spaceflight has been characterized by greater international cooperation, cheaper access to low Earth orbit and an expansion of commercial ventures. Interplanetary probes have visited all of the planets in the Solar System, and humans have remained in orbit for long periods aboard space stations such as Mir and the International Space Station (ISS). Most recently, China has emerged as the third nation with the capability to launch independent crewed missions, while operators in the commercial sector have developed reusable booster systems and craft launched from airborne platforms. In 2020, SpaceX became the first commercial operator to successfully launch a crewed mission to the ISS with Crew Dragon Demo-2.

== Background ==
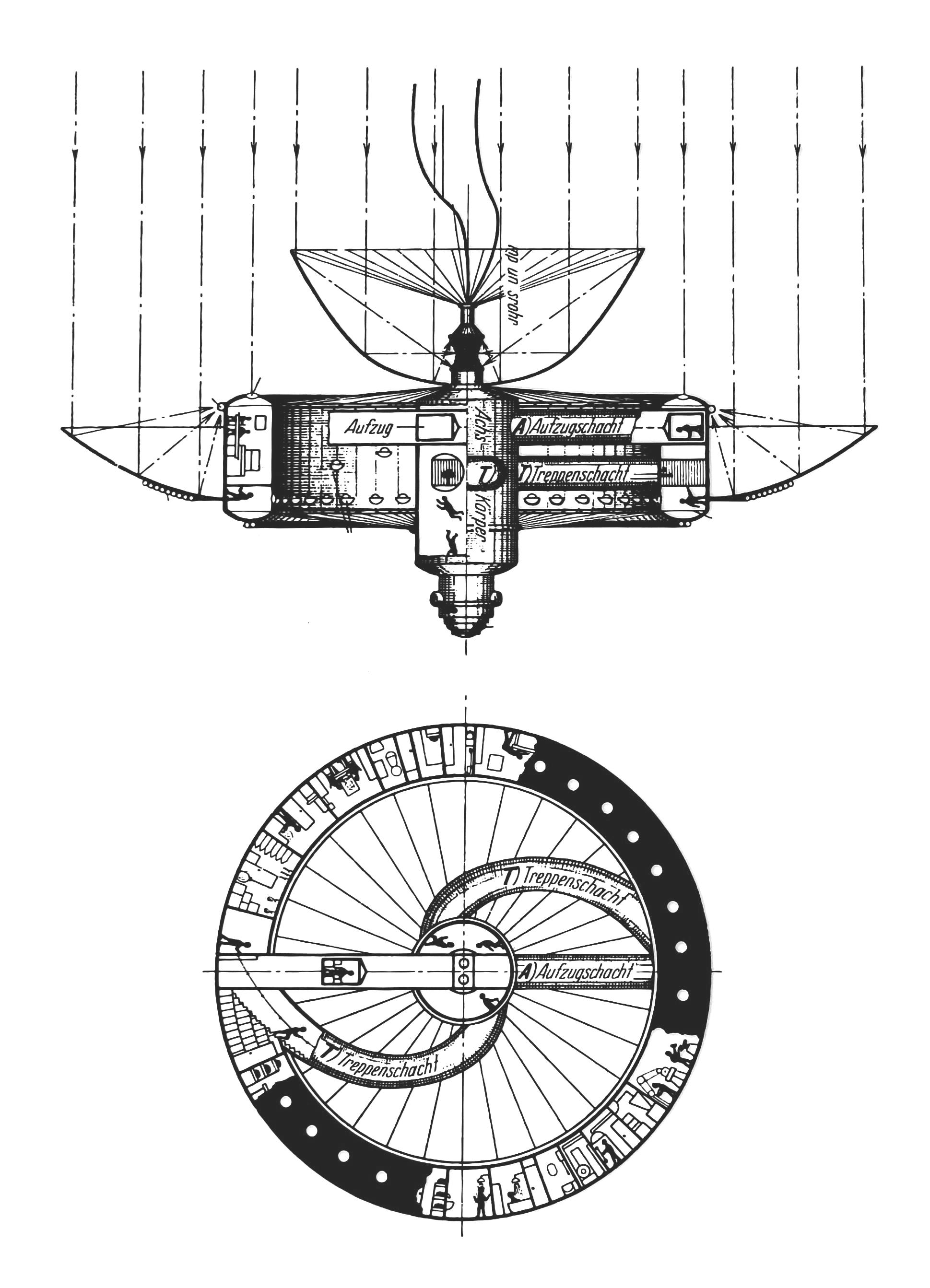
Description of a space station in Hermann Noordung's The Problem of Space Travel (1929)

The Challenges of Outer Space (1955) presented by Wernher von Braun

At the beginning of the 20th century, there was a burst of scientific investigation into interplanetary travel, inspired by authors of science fiction such as Jules Verne (From the Earth to the Moon, Around the Moon) and H.G. Wells (The First Men in the Moon, The War of the Worlds).

The first realistic proposal for spaceflight was "Issledovanie Mirovikh Prostranstv Reaktivnimi Priborami", or "The Exploration of Cosmic Space by Means of Reaction Devices" by Konstantin Tsiolkovsky, published in 1903.

Spaceflight became an engineering possibility with the work of Robert H. Goddard's publication in 1919 of his paper "A Method of Reaching Extreme Altitudes", where his application of the de Laval nozzle to liquid fuel rockets gave sufficient power for interplanetary travel to become possible. This paper was highly influential on Hermann Oberth and Wernher von Braun, later key players in spaceflight.

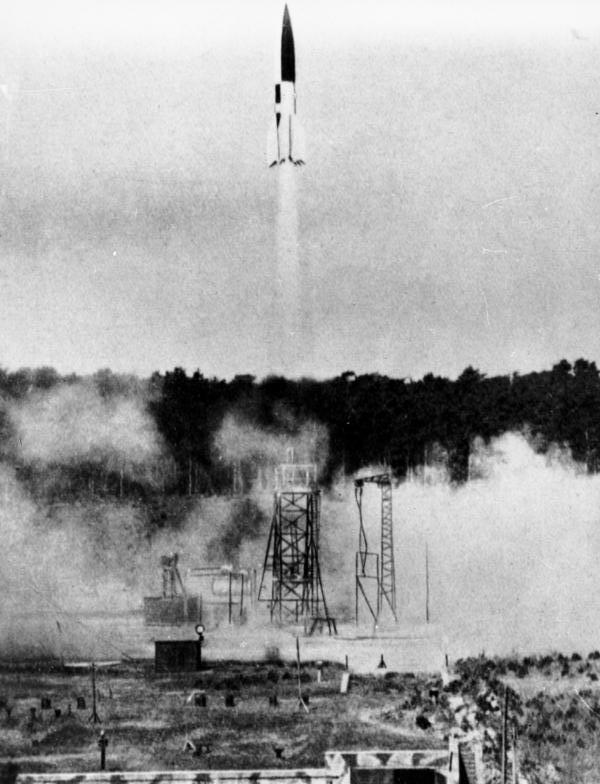
The German V-2 rocket, co-designed by Wernher von Braun, became the first man-made object to reach space.

In 1929, the Slovene officer Hermann Noordung was the first to imagine a complete space station in his book The Problem of Space Travel.

The first rocket to reach space was the German V-2 rocket MW 18014, on a vertical test flight in June 1944 during World War II. After the war ended, the research and development branch of the (British) Ordinance Office organised Operation Backfire which, in October 1945, assembled enough V-2 missiles and supporting components to enable the launch of three (possibly four, depending on source consulted) of them from a site near Cuxhaven in northern Germany. Although these launches were inclined and the rockets did not achieve the altitude necessary to be regarded as sub-orbital spaceflight, the Backfire report remains the most extensive technical documentation of the rocket, including all support procedures, tailored vehicles and fuel composition.

Subsequently, the British Interplanetary Society proposed an enlarged man-carrying version of the V-2 called Megaroc. The plan, written in 1946, envisaged a three-year development programme culminating in the launch of test pilot Eric Brown on a sub-orbital mission in 1949. The decision by the Ministry of Supply under Attlee's government to concentrate on nuclear power generation and sub-sonic passenger jet aircraft delayed the UK's space research.

In 1947, the US sent the first animals in space, fruit flies, although not into orbit, through a V-2 rocket launched from White Sands Missile Range, New Mexico. On June 14, 1949, the US launched the first mammal into space, a rhesus macaque monkey named Albert II, on a sub-orbital flight, though Albert II died when the parachute failed. On July 22, 1951, the Soviets launched the Soviet space dogs, Dezik and Tsygan, who were the first dogs in space and the first to safely return.

== Establishment and Space Race ==
=== First artificial satellites ===
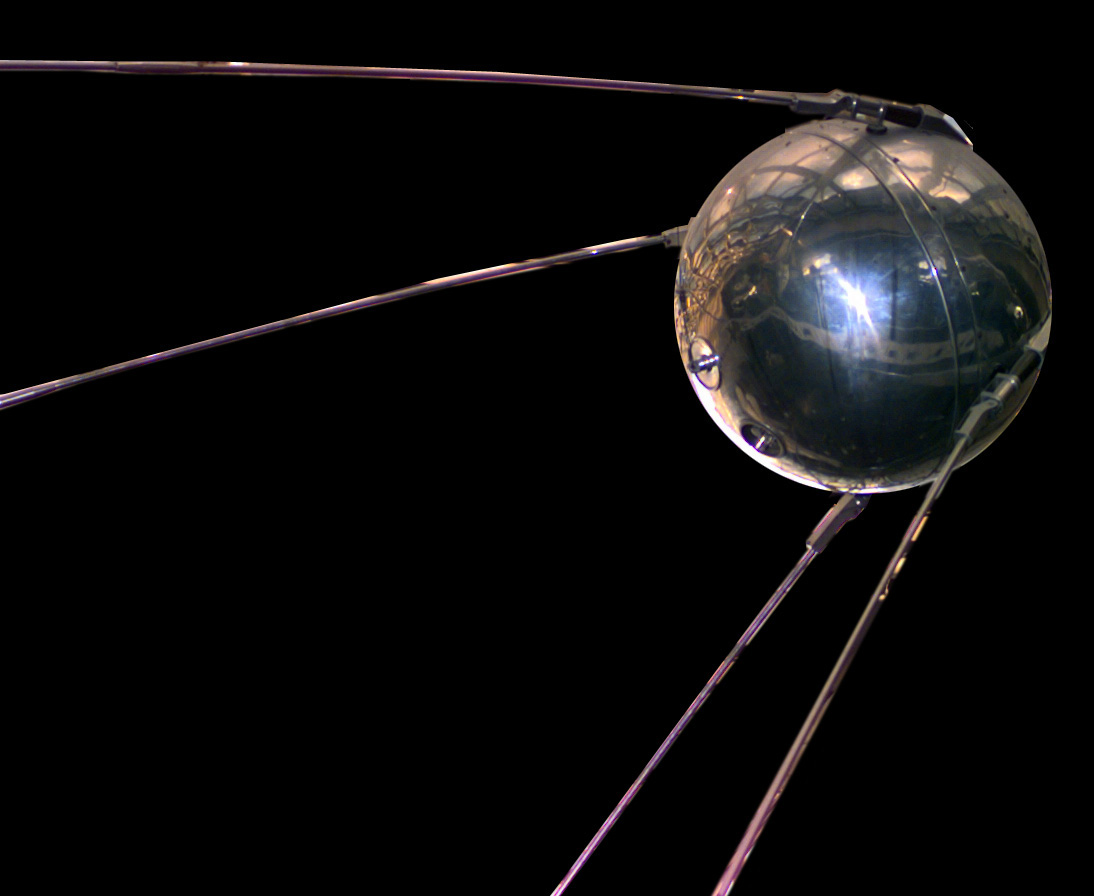
A replica of Sputnik 1 on display

The race began in 1957 when both the US and the USSR made statements announcing they planned to launch artificial satellites during the 18-month long International Geophysical Year of July 1957 to December 1958. On July 29, 1957, the US announced a planned launch of the Vanguard by the spring of 1958, and on July 31, the USSR announced it would launch a satellite in the fall of 1957.

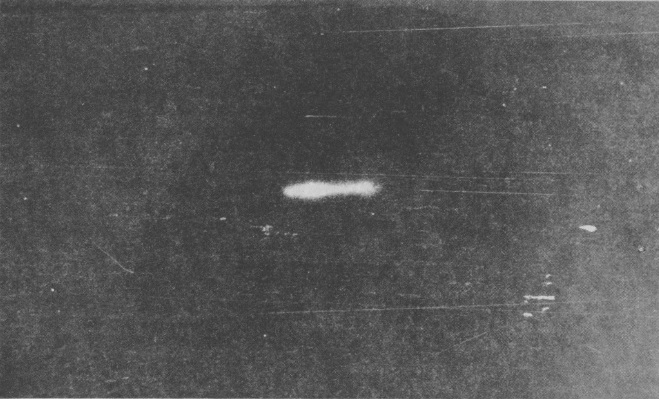
Photograph of Sputnik 2 and its rocket taken by Air Force personnel at Air Force Missile Test Center, Patrick Air Force Base, Florida

On October 4, 1957, the Soviet Union launched Sputnik 1, the first artificial satellite of Earth in the history of humankind.

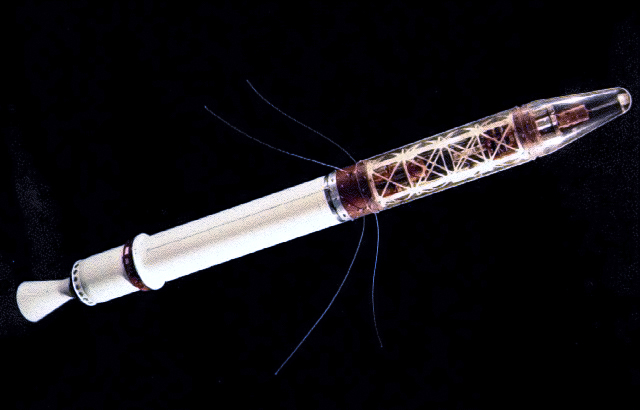
Explorer 1 satellite, the third Satellite put into orbit, and the first by NASA

On November 3, 1957, the Soviet Union launched the second satellite, Sputnik 2, and the first to carry a living animal into orbit, a dog named Laika. Sputnik 3 was launched on May 15, 1958, and carried a large array of instruments for geophysical research and provided data on pressure and composition of the upper atmosphere, concentration of charged particles, photons in cosmic rays, heavy nuclei in cosmic rays, magnetic and electrostatic fields, and meteoric particles. After a series of failures with the program, the US succeeded with Explorer 1, which became the first US satellite in space, on February 1, 1958. This carried scientific instrumentation and detected the theorized Van Allen radiation belt. The US public shock over Sputnik 1 became known as the Sputnik crisis. On July 29, 1958, the US Congress passed legislation turning the National Advisory Committee for Aeronautics into the National Aeronautics and Space Administration (NASA) with responsibility for the nation's civilian space programs. In 1959, NASA began Project Mercury to launch single-man capsules into Earth orbit and chose a corps of seven astronauts introduced as the Mercury Seven.

=== First man in space ===
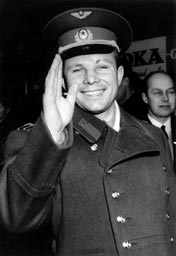
Yuri Gagarin

On April 12, 1961, the USSR opened the era of crewed spaceflight, with the flight of the first cosmonaut (Russian name for space travelers), Yuri Gagarin. Gagarin's flight, part of the Soviet Vostok space exploration program, took 108 minutes and consisted of a single orbit of the Earth.

On August 7, 1961, Gherman Titov, another Soviet cosmonaut, became the second man in orbit during his Vostok 2 mission. Titov orbited Earth 17 times in over 25 hours during his spaceflight.

By June 16, 1963, the USSR launched a total of six Vostok cosmonauts, two pairs of them flying concurrently, and accumulating a total of 260 cosmonaut-orbits and just over sixteen cosmonaut-days in space.

On May 5, 1961, the US launched its first suborbital Mercury astronaut, Alan Shepard, in the Freedom 7 capsule.

=== First woman in space ===
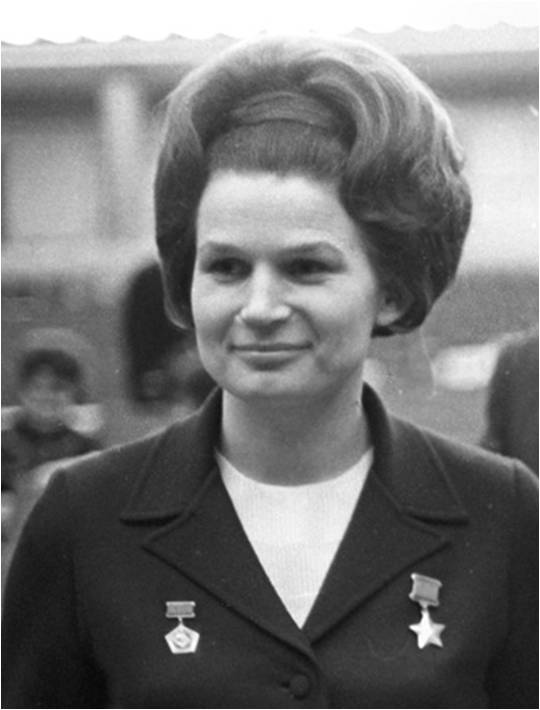
Valentina Tereshkova

The first woman in space was former civilian parachutist Valentina Tereshkova, who entered orbit on June 16, 1963, aboard the Soviet mission Vostok 6. The chief Soviet spacecraft designer, Sergey Korolyov, conceived of the idea to recruit a female cosmonaut corps and launch two women concurrently on Vostok 5/6. However, his plan was changed to launch a male first in Vostok 5, followed shortly afterward by Tereshkova. The then first secretary of the Soviet Union, Nikita Khrushchev, spoke to Tereshkova by radio during her flight.

On November 3, 1963, Tereshkova married fellow cosmonaut Andrian Nikolayev, who had previously flown on Vostok 3. On June 8, 1964, she gave birth to the first child conceived by two space travelers. The couple divorced in 1982, and Tereshkova went on to become a prominent member of the Communist Party of the Soviet Union.

The second woman to fly to space was aviator Svetlana Savitskaya, aboard Soyuz T-7 on August 18, 1982.

=== Competition develops ===
Khrushchev pressured Korolyov to quickly produce greater space achievements in competition with the announced Gemini and Apollo plans. Rather than allowing him to develop his plans for a crewed Soyuz spacecraft, he was forced to make modifications to squeeze two or three men into the Vostok capsule, calling the result Voskhod. Only two of these were launched. Voskhod 1 was the first spacecraft with a crew of three, who could not wear space suits because of size and weight constrictions. Alexei Leonov made the first spacewalk when he left the Voskhod 2 on March 8, 1965. He was almost lost in space when he had extreme difficulty fitting his inflated space suit back into the cabin through an airlock, and a landing error forced him and Voskhod 2 crewmate Pavel Belyayev to be lost in dense woods for hours before being found by the recovery crew and rescued days later.

The start of crewed Gemini missions was delayed a year later than NASA had planned, but ten largely successful missions were launched in 1965 and 1966, allowing the US to overtake the Soviet lead by achieving space rendezvous (Gemini 6A) and docking (Gemini 8) of two vehicles, long duration flights of eight days (Gemini 5) and fourteen days (Gemini 7), and demonstrating the use of extra-vehicular activity to do useful work outside a spacecraft (Gemini 12).

The USSR made no crewed flights during this period but continued to develop its Soyuz craft and secretly accepted Kennedy's implicit lunar challenge, designing Soyuz variants for lunar orbit and landing. They also attempted to develop the N1, a large, crewed Moon-capable launch vehicle similar to the US Saturn V.

As both nations rushed to get their new spacecraft flying with men, the intensity of the competition caught up to them in early 1967, when they suffered their first crew fatalities. On January 27, the entire crew of Apollo 1, "Gus" Grissom, Ed White, and Roger Chaffee, were killed by suffocation in a fire that swept through their cabin during a ground test approximately one month before their planned launch. On April 24, the single pilot of Soyuz 1, Vladimir Komarov, was killed in a crash when his landing parachutes tangled, after a mission cut short by electrical and control system problems. Both accidents were determined to be caused by design defects in the spacecraft, which were corrected before crewed flights resumed.

=== Approaches and Landings on Venus ===
On February 12, 1961, the Soviet spacecraft Venera 1 was the first flyby probe launched to another planet. However communications with the probe failed before it could complete its mission. Venera 3, which also lost contact, marked the first time a man-made object made contact with another planet after it impacted Venus on March 1, 1966. Venera 4, Venera 5, and Venera 6 performed successful atmospheric entry.

In 1970 Venera 7 marked the first time a spacecraft was able to return data after landing on another planet. In 1972, Venera 8 landed on Venus and measured the light level as being suitable for surface photography. In 1975, Venera 9 established an orbit around Venus and successfully returned the first photography of the surface of Venus. Venera 10 landed on Venus and followed with further photography shortly after.

In 1981, Venera 13 performed a successful soft-landing on Venus and marked the first probe to drill into the surface of another planet and take a sample. Venera 13 also took an audio sample of the Venusian environment, marking another first.

Venera 13 returned the first color images of the surface of Venus, revealing an orange-brown flat bedrock surface covered with loose regolith and small flat thin angular rocks. The composition of the sample determined by the X-ray fluorescence spectrometer put it in the class of weakly differentiated melanocratic alkaline gabbroids, similar to terrestrial leucitic basalt with a high potassium content. The acoustic detector returned the sounds of the spacecraft operations and the background wind, estimated to be a speed of around 0.5 m/sec wind. Venera 14 followed suit in an identical mission profile.

In total, 10 Venera probes achieved a soft landing on the surface of Venus.

In 1984, the Vega programme began and ended with the launch of two crafts launched 6 days apart, Vega 1 and Vega 2. Both crafts deployed a balloon in addition to a lander, marking a first in spaceflight.

The first successful flyby Venus probe was the American Mariner 2 spacecraft, which flew past Venus in 1962, coming within 35,000 km. A modified Ranger Moon probe, it established that Venus has practically no intrinsic magnetic field and measured the temperature of the planet's atmosphere to be approximately 500 °C (773 K; 932 °F).

=== Manned Lunar missions ===
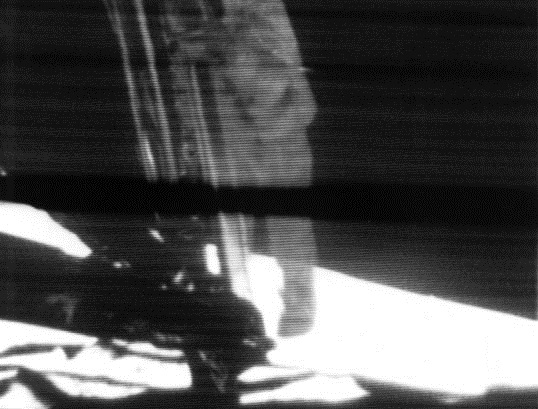
Neil Armstrong climbing down Lunar Module Eagle's ladder to take the first step onto the Moon (Apollo 11, 1969)

The US conducted the first crewed spaceflight to leave Earth orbit and orbit the Moon on December 21, 1968, with the Apollo 8 space mission. Later they succeeded in achieving President Kennedy's goal on July 20, 1969, with the lunar landing of Apollo 11. Neil Armstrong and Buzz Aldrin became the first men to set foot on the Moon. Six such successful landings were achieved through 1972, with one failure on Apollo 13.

The first three Apollo missions to land astronauts on the Moon, Apollo 11, 12, and 14, did not enable exploration of a large portion of the lunar surface. Apollo 14 featured the longest journey on foot undertaken by the lunar explorers, with Alan Shepard and Edgar Mitchell bringing a cart called a Modular Equipment Transporter to help with sampling of moon rocks, but the men did not quite reach their intended destination of the Cone Crater. However, the last three Apollo missions, Apollo 15, 16, and 17, featured the lunar rover, which enabled longer and farther exploration by the astronauts on those flights. The astronauts on the last three Apollo missions drove over 56 miles around the lunar surface using the rovers, and were able to collect 620 pounds of moon rocks, three quarters of the total collected during the Apollo missions. More crewed moon landings were planned, through Apollo 20, but after the loss of public interest following Apollo 11 (which contributed to a shrinking budget for NASA) and the near catastrophe of Apollo 13, three Apollo missions were canceled.

The N1 rocket suffered four catastrophic uncrewed launch failures between 1969 and 1972, and the Soviet government officially discontinued its crewed lunar program on June 24, 1974, when Valentin Glushko succeeded Korolyov as General Spacecraft Designer.

=== Later phase ===
Move to cooperation

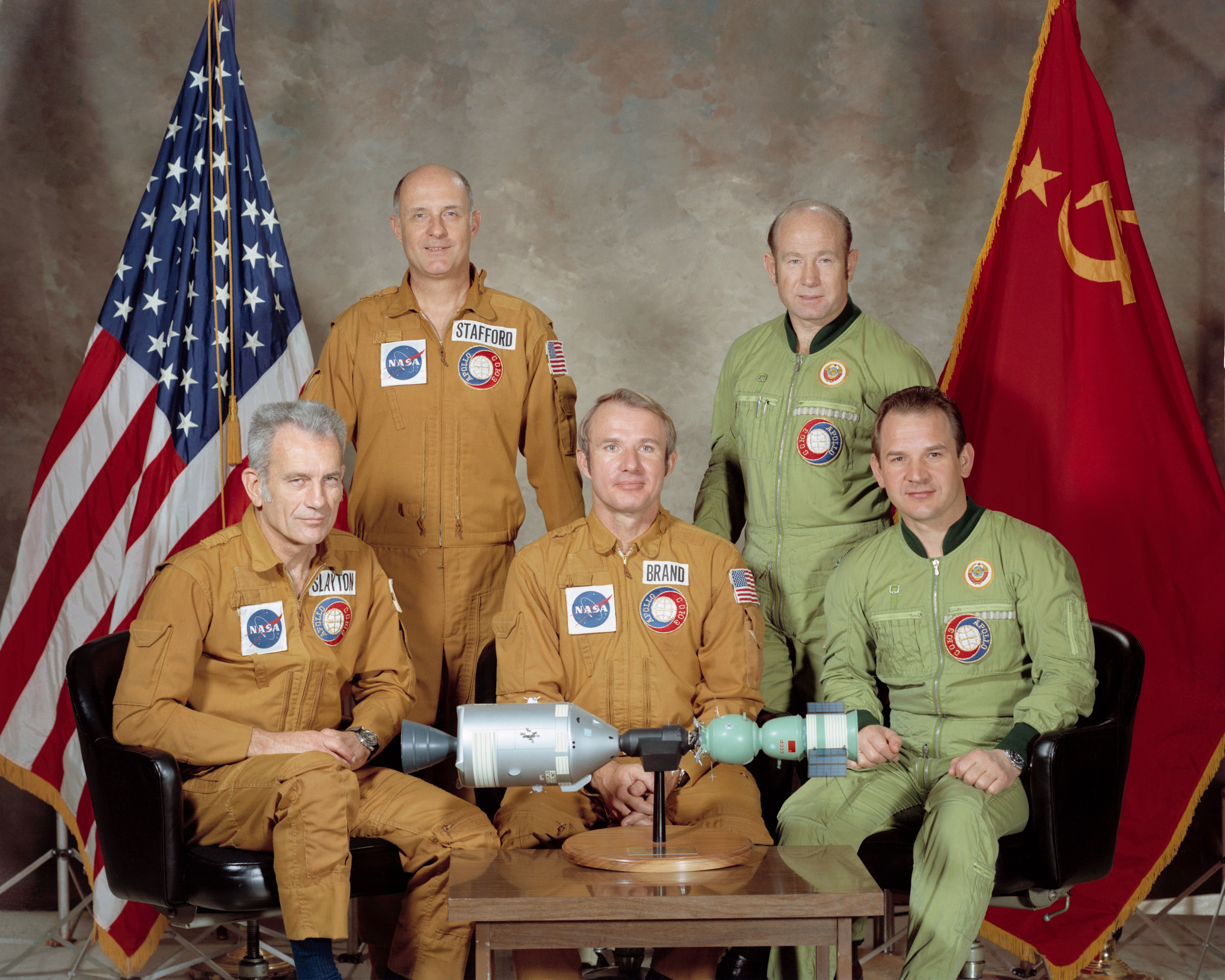
Apollo–Soyuz Test Project (ASTP, 1975), first docking between the two competitor states, testing shared docking systems enabling future cooperation programs away from the competition

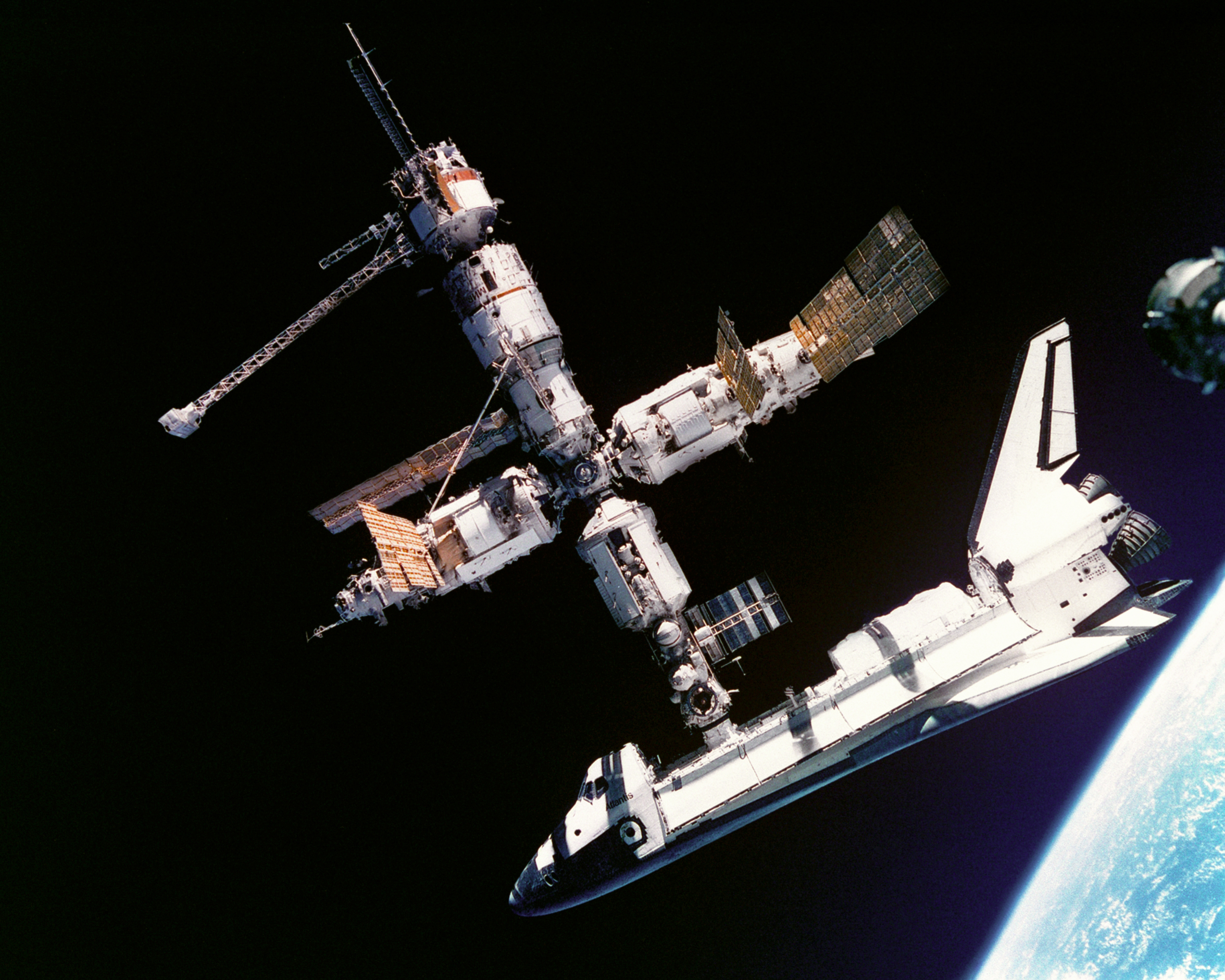
Space Shuttle (US) docked to Mir (USSR/Russia) (1995), both products of the ending competition, joined in the Shuttle-Mir program (1993–1998) which facilitated the ongoing International Space Station programme.

Both nations went on to fly relatively small, non-permanent crewed space laboratories Salyut and Skylab, using their Soyuz and Apollo craft as shuttles. The US launched only one Skylab, but the USSR launched a total of seven "Salyuts", three of which were secretly Almaz military crewed reconnaissance stations, which carried a cannon (possibly to test for potential use in space warfare). Crewed reconnaissance stations were found to be a bad idea since uncrewed satellites could do the job much more cost-effectively. The United States Air Force had planned a crewed reconnaissance station, the Manned Orbital Laboratory, which was cancelled in 1969. The Soviets cancelled Almaz in 1978.

In a season of detente, the two competitors declared an end to the race and literally shook hands on July 17, 1975, with the Apollo–Soyuz Test Project, where the two craft docked, and the crews exchanged visits.

== Diversification ==
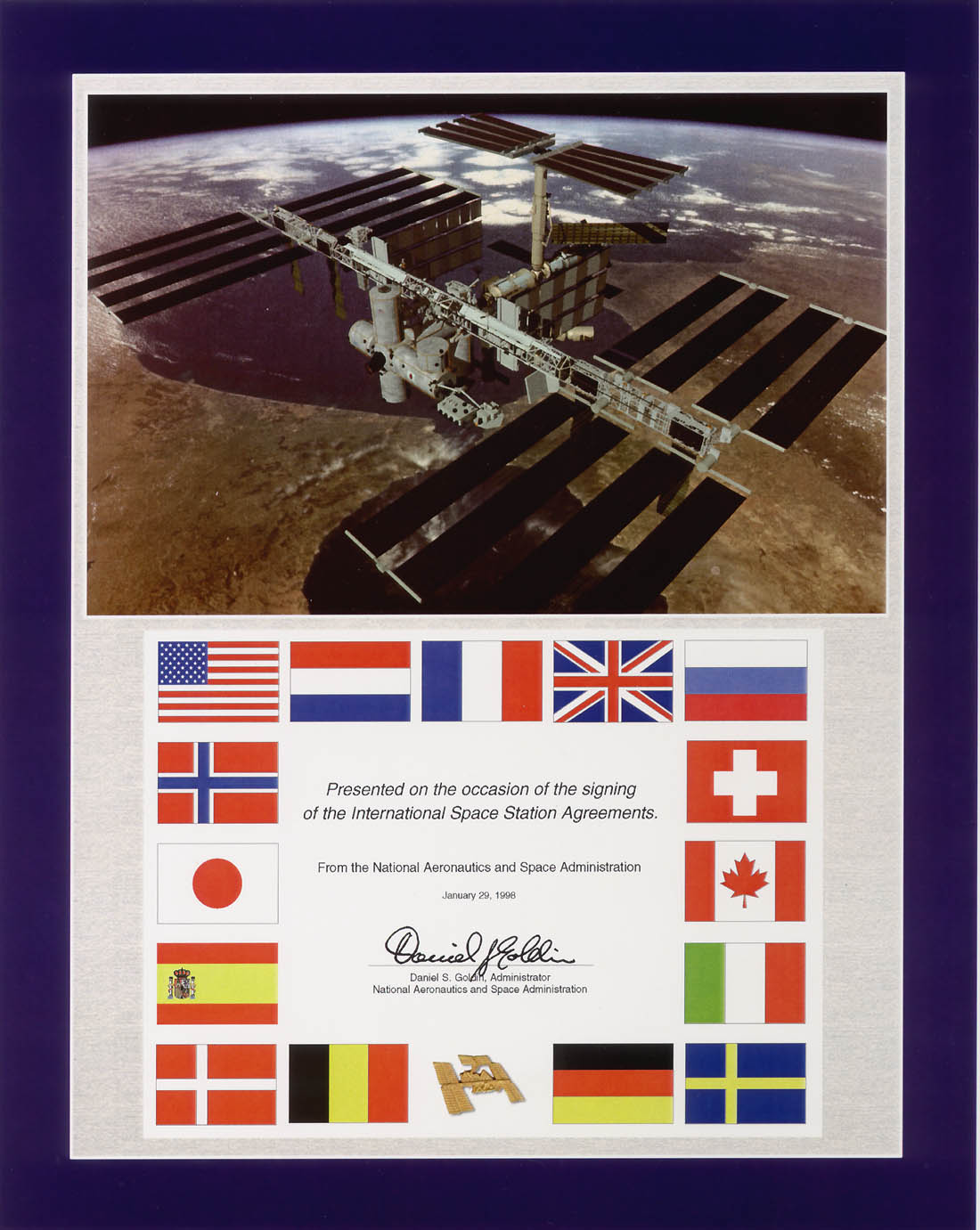
A commemorative plaque honouring the Space Station Intergovernmental Agreement (IGA) for the International Space Station, signed on 28 January 1998 and symbolic for the increasing diversification and internationalization of spaceflight since its beginning

The participation of private actors and other countries beside the Soviet Union and the United States in spaceflight had been the case from the start of spaceflight development. A first commercial satellite had been launched by 1962, as well as in 1965 a third country achieving orbital spaceflight. The beginning of the space age, the launch of Sputnik, was in the context of international exchange, the International Geophysical Year 1957. Also, soon into the space age the international community came together starting to negotiate dedicated international law governing outer space activity.

In the 1970s the Soviet Union started to invite other countries to fly their people into space through its Intercosmos program and the United States started to include women and people of colour in its astronaut program.

The first exchange between the United States and the Soviet Union was formalized in the 1962 Dryden-Blagonravov agreement, calling for cooperation on the exchange of data from weather satellites, a study of the Earth's magnetic field, and joint tracking of the NASA Echo II balloon satellite. In 1963 President Kennedy interested premier Khrushchev in a joint crewed Moon landing, but after the assassination of Kennedy in November 1963 and Khrushchev's removal from office in October 1964, the competition between the two nations' crewed space programs heated up, and talk of cooperation became less common, due to tense relations and military implications. Only later the United States and the Soviet Union slowly started to exchange more information and engage in joint programs, particularly in the light of the development of safety standards since 1970, producing the co-developed APAS-75 and later docking standards. Most notably this signaled the ending of the first era of the space age, the Space Race, through the Apollo-Soyuz mission which became the basis for the Shuttle-Mir program and eventually the International Space Station programme.

Such international cooperation, and international spaceflight organization was furthermore fueled by increasingly more countries achieving spaceflight capabilities and together with a1980s private spaceflight sector, both being embodied by the European Space Agency. This allowed the formation of an international and commercial post-Space Race spaceflight economy and period, with by the 1990s a public perception of space exploration and space-related technologies as being increasingly commonplace.

This increasingly cooperative diversification persisted until competition started to rise in the diversified conditions, from the 2010s and particularly by the early 2020s.

== New competition ==
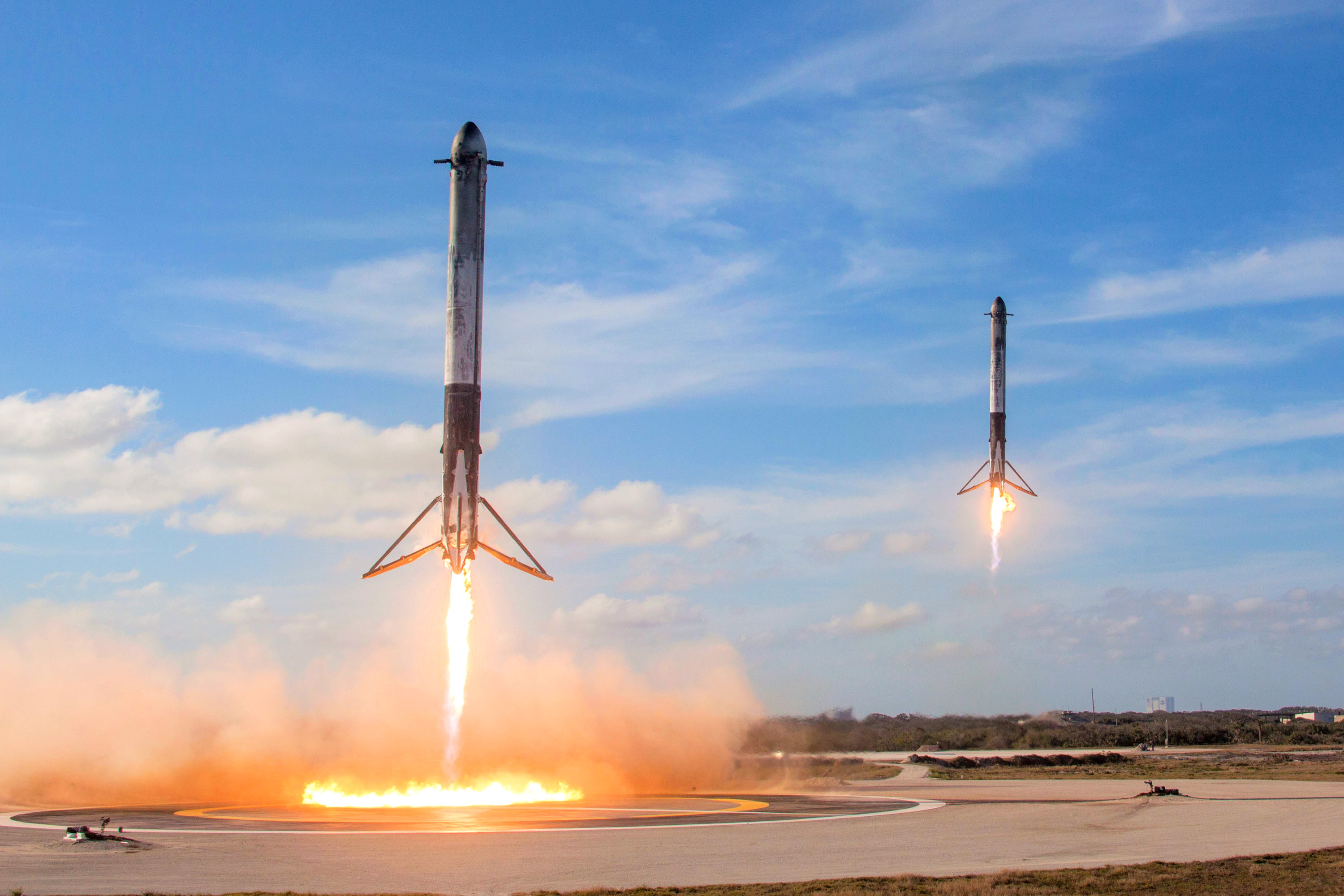
SpaceX's Falcon Heavy reusable side boosters land in unison at Cape Canaveral Landing Zones 1 and 2 following test flight on 6 February 2018

Starting in the 2010s the diversified spaceflight sector had become by the 2020s increasingly competitive with returning international competition and cooperation barriers, like a cooperation ban enacted in the United States on China in 2011 and later the European Space Agency banning Russia, and increased private competition in spaceflight capabilities, enabled by the Commercial Space Launch Competitiveness Act of 2015.

Some have called it a New Space Race period, particularly in light of China's speedy advances and other Asian countries competing in advancing their spaceflight achievements, creating an Asian Space Race. Although international cooperation and international private spaceflight remains an integral part of the sector, there is competitively diversifying commercial international contracting, such as international private human spaceflight of e.g. Axiom Space in cooperation with different countries and heavily relying on the International Space Station, which also continued operation despite international confrontations like the Russian invasion of Ukraine, while private spaceflight, with SpaceX's Starlink, became a significant element in the Russo-Ukrainian war and international politics.

While payloads on the NASA Space Shuttle once cost US$54,000 per kilogram, natural competition among launch capabilities driven by the SpaceX Falcon 9 partially reusable spacecraft have brought down launch costs to as little as US$3,246 per kilogram (about double that cost with rideshare) with future expected costs of SpaceX Starship at less than US$500 per kilogram. Other examples of lower cost are United Launch Alliance's Vulcan Centaur at about US$4,000 per kilogram and the smaller-payload option of Electron Space US$25,000 per kilogram (minimum of 300 kilograms) for a dedicated (non-rideshare) launch.

Meanwhile, a range of new lunar spaceflight programs are being advanced especially as international programs, from the Artemis program and the China-Russian plans to establish a lunar base, to the European Space Agency planned Moon Village.

This competitive but international commercial development of the spaceflight sector has been called the New Space.

== By programs ==
Orbital human spaceflight (beyond Kármán line)
Program	Years	Flights	First Crewed Flight
Vostok	1961–1963	6	Vostok 1
Mercury	1962–1963	4 (Note: Project Mercury's first two flights were suborbital flights (listed below), while its latter four flights were orbital flights.)	Mercury-Atlas 6
Voskhod	1964–1965	2	Voskhod 1
Gemini	1965–1966	10	Gemini 3
Soyuz	1967–present	153 (Note: Includes several special cases. Soyuz 1 and Soyuz 11 were both fatal missions which reached space. Soyuz 19 was the Soviet participant in the Apollo–Soyuz Test Project, a separate craft from the American Apollo craft which is listed below. Soyuz 32 brought a crew to the Salyut 6 space station, but the crew returned on Soyuz 34, which had been sent to the station without a crew. Soyuz T-10a was an aborted launch attempt which failed to reach space. As orbital flights or committed attempts, all of the above are included in the number. The two crewed Soyuz flights not included in this number are Soyuz 18a and Soyuz MS-10, aborted missions. The former nevertheless reached space as a suborbital flight, and is therefore listed separately below.)	Soyuz 1
Apollo	1968–1972	11 (Note: Does not include Apollo 1.)	Apollo 7
Skylab	1973–1974	3	Skylab 2
Apollo-Soyuz	1975	1 (Note: Represents the American Apollo craft. The Soviet craft, Soyuz 19, is counted in the above Soyuz number.)	Apollo-Soyuz
Space Shuttle	1981–2011	135 (Note: Includes two fatal missions: STS-51-L, and STS-107. The former did not reach space, while the latter did.)	STS-1
Shenzhou	2003–present	17	Shenzhou 5
Crew Dragon	2020–present	21	Demo-2
Starliner	2024–present	1	Boeing Crew Flight Test
Suborbital human spaceflight			
Program	Year	Flights	
Mercury	1961	2	Mercury 3
X-15	1963	2	Flight 90
Soyuz 18a	1975	1	Soyuz 18a
SpaceShipOne	2004	3	Flight 15P
New Shepard	2021–present	17	NS-16

=== United States ===
Until the 21st century, space programs of the United States were exclusively operated by government agencies. In the 21st century, several aerospace companies began efforts at developing a private space industry, with SpaceX being the most successful so far.

==== NASA ====
The National Aeronautics and Space Administration (NASA; /ˈnæsə/) is an independent agency of the U.S. federal government responsible for the United States' civil space program, as well as research in aeronautics and space. Headquartered in Washington, D.C., NASA operates ten field centers across the US and is organized into three mission directorates: Human Spaceflight, Research and Technology, and Science. Established in 1958 amid the Space Race, NASA succeeded the National Advisory Committee for Aeronautics (NACA) to give the US space program a distinct civilian orientation focused on peaceful applications. Since then, it has led most American spaceflight programs, including Project Mercury, Project Gemini, the Apollo program, Skylab, the Space Shuttle, the International Space Station (ISS), and the ongoing multinational Artemis program.

===== Project Mercury =====
Project Mercury was the first human spaceflight program of the United States, running from 1958 through 1963. Its goal was to put a person into Earth orbit and return them safely, ideally before the Soviet Union. John Glenn became the first American to orbit the Earth on February 20, 1962, aboard the Mercury-Atlas 6.

===== Project Gemini =====
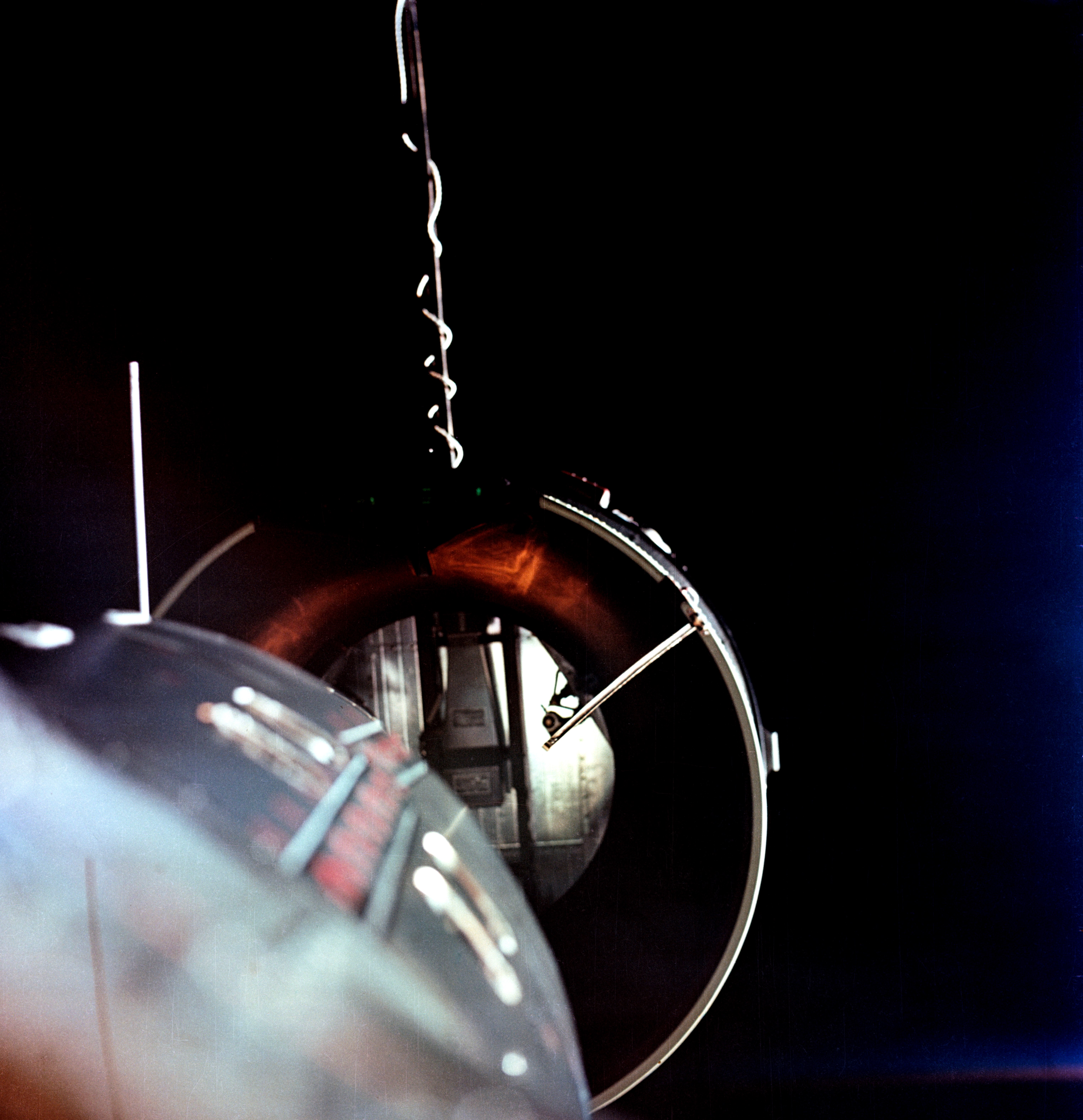
The Gemini 8 approaches the docking collar of the Agena target vehicle.

Project Gemini was NASA's second human spaceflight program. The program ran from 1961 to 1966. The program pioneered the orbital maneuvers required for space rendezvous. Ed White became the first American to make an extravehicular activity (EVA, or "space walk"), on June 3, 1965, during Gemini 4. Gemini 6A and 7 accomplished the first space rendezvous on December 15, 1965. Gemini 8 achieved the first space docking with an uncrewed Agena Target Vehicle on March 16, 1966. Gemini 8 was also the first US spacecraft to experience in-space critical failure endangering the lives of the crew.

===== Apollo program =====
The Apollo program was the third human spaceflight program carried out by NASA. The program's goal was to orbit and land crewed vehicles on the Moon. The program ran from 1969 to 1972. Apollo 8 was the first human spaceflight to leave Earth orbit and orbit the Moon on December 21, 1968. Neil Armstrong and Buzz Aldrin became the first men to set foot on the Moon during the Apollo 11 mission on July 20, 1969.

===== Skylab =====
The Skylab program's goal was to create the first space station of NASA. The program marked the last launch of the Saturn V rocket on May 14, 1973. Many experiments were performed on board, including unprecedented solar studies. The longest crewed mission of the program was Skylab 4 which lasted 84 days, from November 16, 1973, to February 8, 1974. The total mission duration was 2249 days, with Skylab finally falling from orbit over Australia on July 11, 1979.

===== Space Shuttle =====
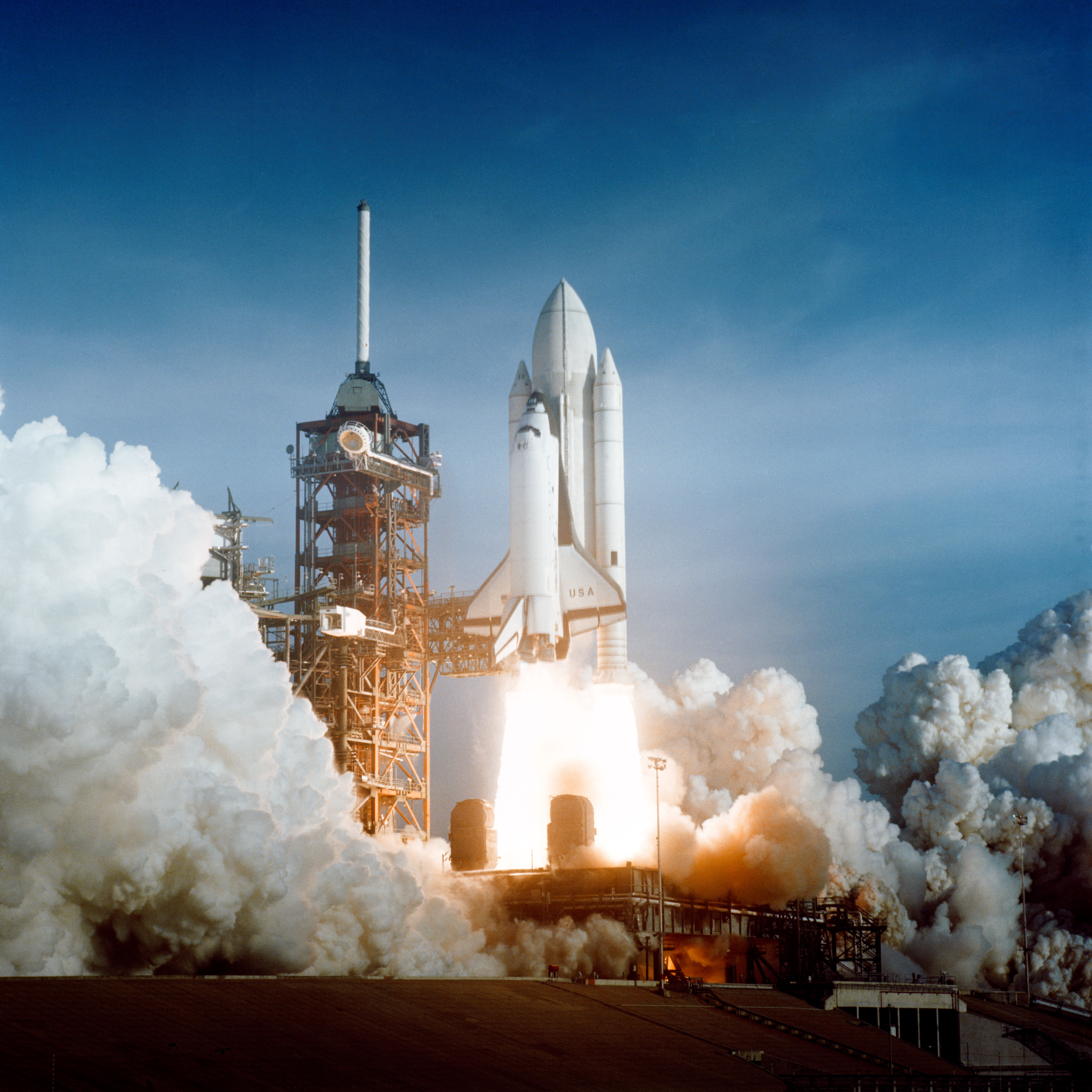
Space Shuttle Columbia seconds after engine ignition during STS-1, 1981

Although its pace slowed, space exploration continued after the end of the Space Race. The United States launched the first reusable spacecraft, the Space Shuttle, on the 20th anniversary of Gagarin's flight, April 12, 1981. On November 15, 1988, the Soviet Union duplicated this with an uncrewed flight of the only Buran-class shuttle to fly, its first and only reusable spacecraft. It was never used again after the first flight; instead, the Soviet Union continued to develop space stations using the Soyuz craft as the crew shuttle.

Sally Ride became the first American woman in space in 1983. Eileen Collins was the first female Shuttle pilot, and with Shuttle mission STS-93 in July 1999 she became the first woman to command a US spacecraft.The United States continued missions to the ISS and other goals with the high-cost Shuttle system, which was retired in 2011.

=== Soviet Union ===
The Soviet space program (Russian: Космическая программа СССР, romanized: Kosmicheskaya programma SSSR) was the state space program of the Soviet Union, active from 1951 until the dissolution of the Soviet Union in 1991. Unlike its Space Race competitor, the United States, which consolidated its space program under NASA, the Soviet space program was divided between several competing design bureaus led by Korolev, Kerimov, Keldysh, Yangel, Glushko, Chelomey, Makeyev, Chertok and Reshetnev, often under the Ministry of General Machine-Building. The program was an important part of the Soviet claim to superpower status.

==== Sputnik ====
The Sputnik 1 became the first artificial Earth satellite on 4 October 1957. The satellite transmitted a radio signal, but had no sensors otherwise. Studying the Sputnik 1 allowed scientists to calculate the drag from the upper atmosphere by measuring position and speed of the satellite. Sputnik 1 broadcast for 21 days until its batteries depleted on 4 October 1957, and the satellite finally fell from orbit on 4 January 1958.

==== Luna programme ====
The Luna programme was a series of uncrewed robotic satellite launches with the goal of studying the Moon. The program ran from 1959 to 1976 and consisted of 15 successful missions; the program achieved many first achievements and collected data on the Moon's chemical composition, gravity, temperature, and radiation. Luna 2 became the first human-made object to make contact with the Moon's surface in September 1959. Luna 3 returned the first photographs of the far side of the Moon in October 1959.

==== Vostok ====
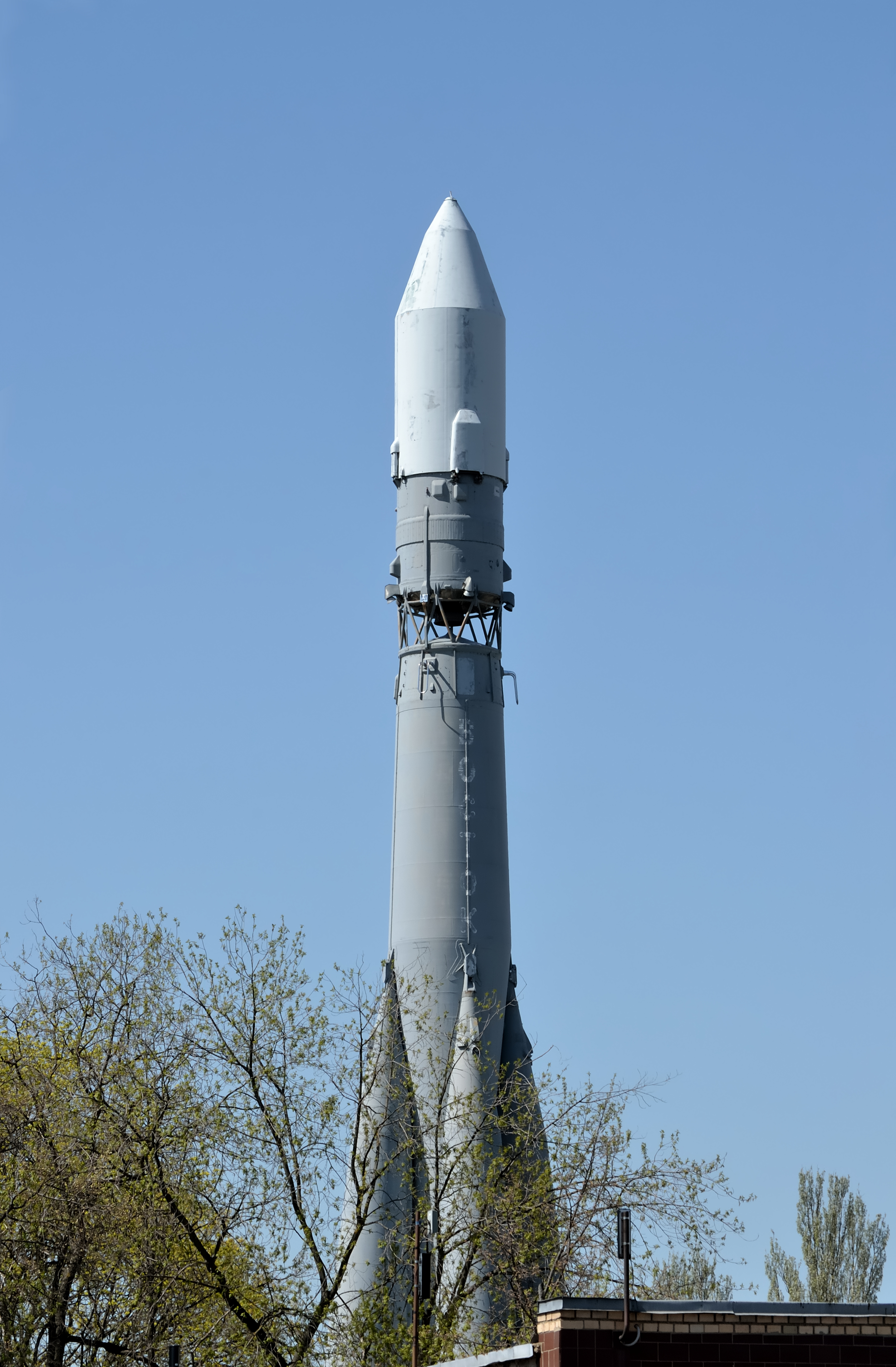
Vostok-2M (8A292M) in Korolyov, Moscow Oblast

The Vostok Programme was the first Soviet spaceflight project to put Soviet citizens into low Earth orbit and return them safely. The programme carried out six crewed spaceflights between 1961 and 1963. The program was the first program to put humans into space, with Yuri Gagarin becoming the first man in space on April 12, 1961, aboard the Vostok 1. Gherman Titov became the first person to stay in orbit for a full day on August 7, 1961, aboard the Vostok 2. Valentina Tereshkova became the first woman in space on June 16, 1963, aboard the Vostok 6.

==== Voskhod ====
The Voskhod programme began in 1964 and consisted of two crewed flights before the program was canceled by the Soyuz programme in 1966. Voskhod 1 launched on October 12, 1964, and was the first crewed spaceflight with a multi-crewed vehicle. Alexei Leonov performed the first spacewalk aboard Voskhod 2 on March 18, 1965.

==== Salyut ====
The Salyut programme was the first space station program undertaken by the Soviet Union. The goal was to carry out long-term research into the problems of living in space and a variety of astronomical, biological and Earth-resources experiments. The program ran from 1971 to 1986. Salyut 1, the first station in the program, became the world's first crewed space station.

==== Soyuz programme ====
The Soyuz programme was initiated by the soviet space program in the 1960s and continues as the responsibility of roscosmos to this day. The program currently consists of 140 completed flights, and since the retirement of the US Space Shuttle has been the only craft to transport humans. The program's original goal was part of a program to put a cosmonaut on the Moon and later became crucial to the construction of the Mir space station.

==== Mir ====
Mir (Russian: Мир, IPA: [ˈmʲir]; lit. 'peace' or 'world') was a space station operated in low Earth orbit from 1986 to 2001, first by the Soviet Union and later by the Russian Federation. Mir was the first modular space station and was assembled in orbit from 1986 to 1996. At the time it was the largest artificial satellite in orbit, only being succeeded by the International Space Station (ISS) after Mir's deorbiting in 2001. The station served as a microgravity research laboratory in which crews conducted experiments in biology, human biology, physics, astronomy, meteorology, and spacecraft systems with a goal of developing technologies required for permanent occupation of space.

Mir was the first continuously inhabited long-term research station in orbit and previously held the record for the longest continuous human presence in space at 3,644 days, until it was surpassed by the ISS in 2010. It holds the record for the longest single human spaceflight, Valeri Polyakov, who spent 437 days on the station from 1994 until 1995. Mir's typical crew size was 3, though larger short-term crews made an appearance, peaking at ten during STS-71. Occupied for twelve and a half years out of its fifteen-year lifespan, 105 cosmonauts and astronauts from 12 different nations visited the station, and conducted 80 spacewalks.

==== Buran ====
The Buran programme (Russian: Буран, IPA: [bʊˈran], lit. 'Snowstorm' or 'Blizzard') was a Soviet and later Russian reusable spacecraft project to develop the Energia-Buran system, officially known as the Reusable Space System "Buran" (Многоразовая Космическая Система «Буран»), that formally began in 1976 and was suspended in 1993. In addition to being the designation for the whole Soviet/Russian reusable spacecraft project, Buran was also the name given to orbiter 1K, which completed one uncrewed spaceflight in 1988 and was the only Soviet reusable spacecraft to be launched into space. The Buran orbiters used the expendable Energia rocket as a launch vehicle.

=== International Space Station ===
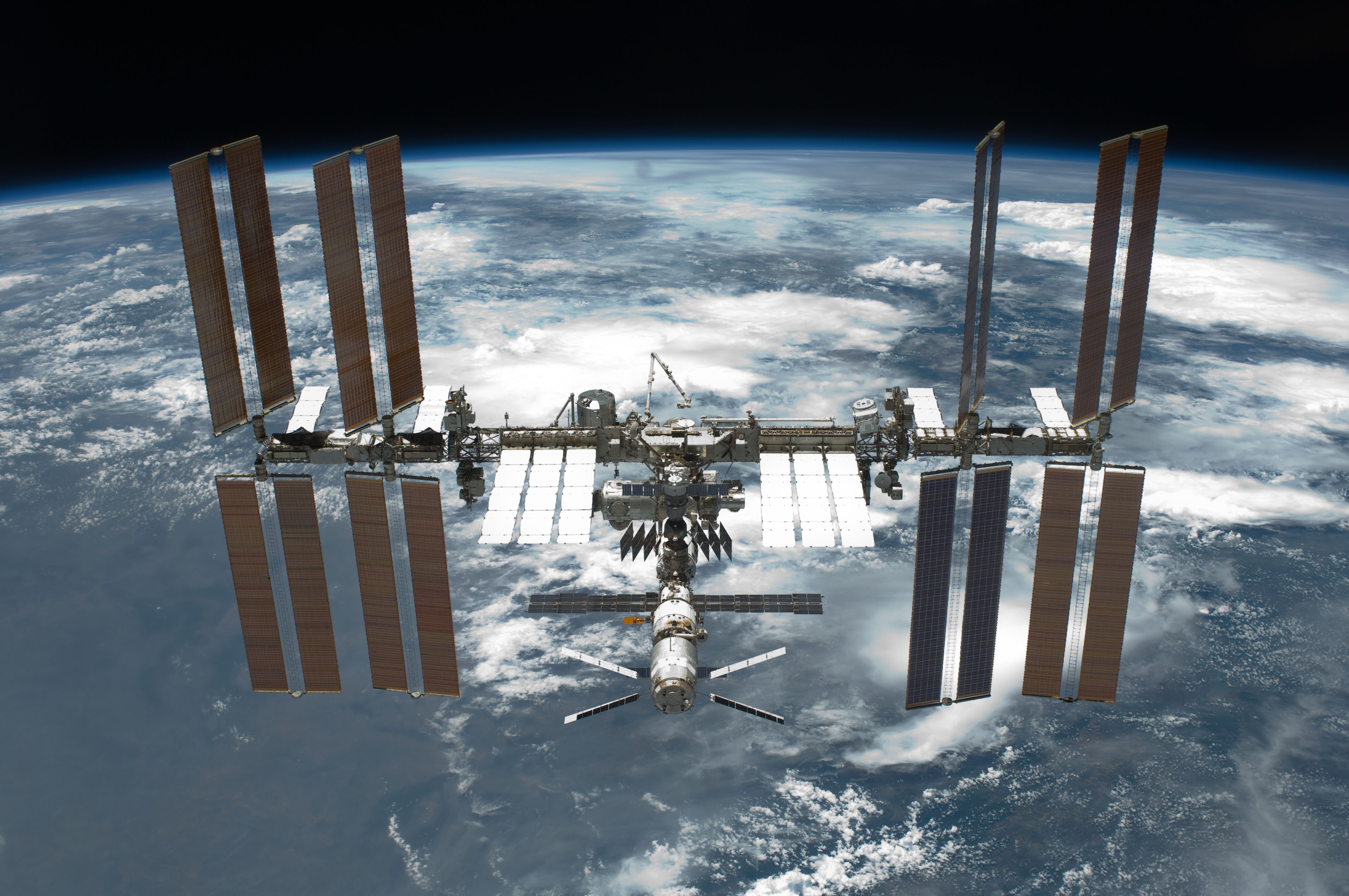
The ISS seen by Space Shuttle Endeavour

Recent space exploration has proceeded, to some extent in worldwide cooperation, the high point of which was the construction and operation of the International Space Station (ISS). At the same time, the international space race between smaller space powers since the end of the 20th century can be considered the foundation and expansion of markets of commercial rocket launches and space tourism.

The United States continued other space exploration, including major participation with the ISS with its own modules. It also planned a set of uncrewed Mars probes, military satellites, and more. The Constellation program, began by President George W. Bush in 2005, aimed to launch the Orion spacecraft by 2018. A subsequent return to the Moon by 2020 was to be followed by crewed flights to Mars, but the program was canceled in 2010 in favor of encouraging commercial US human launch capabilities.

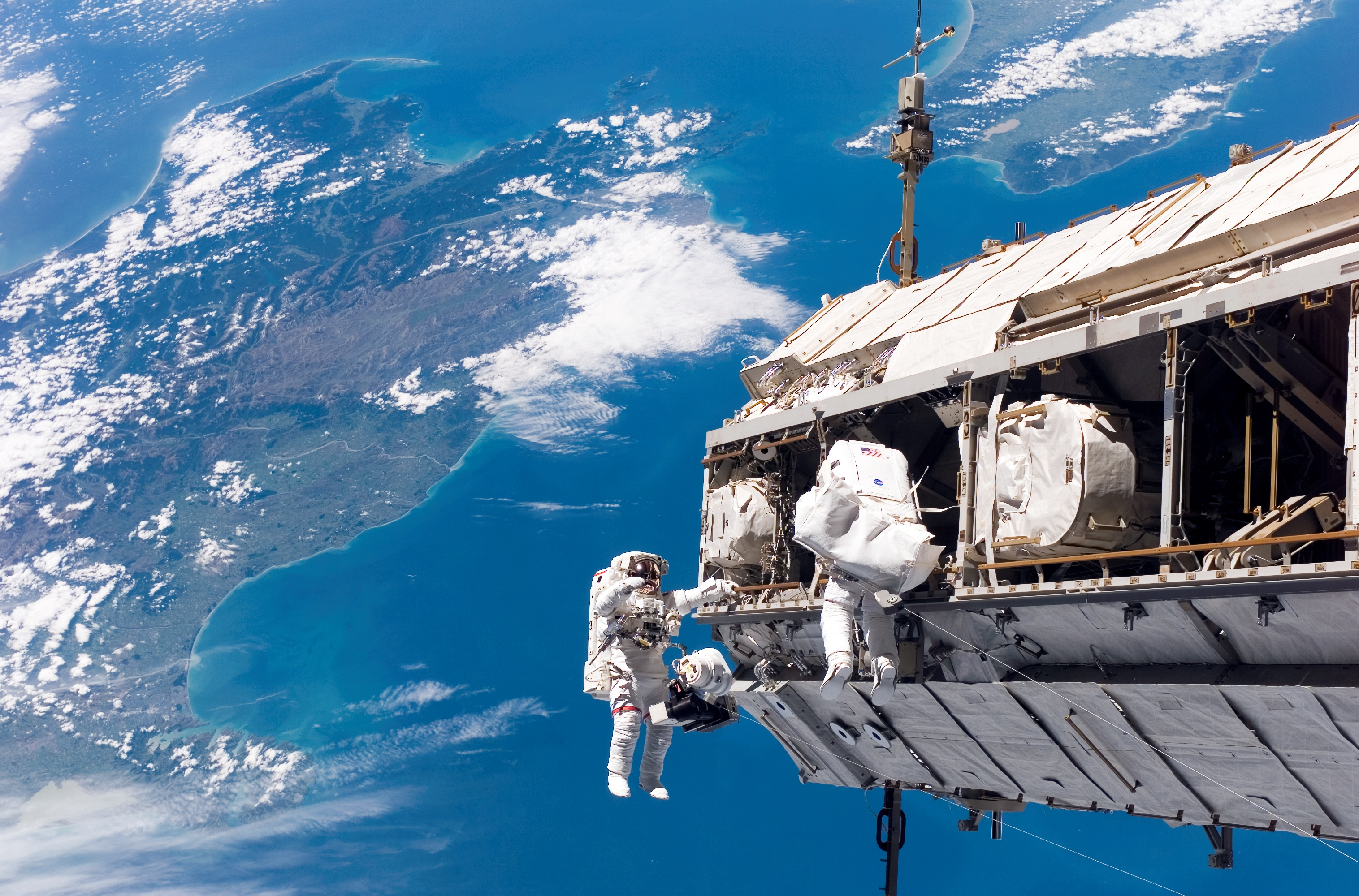
The number of spacewalks required to construct the International Space Station dwarfed the then existing experience base for this activity, a hurdle called the "Wall of EVA."

Russia, a successor to the Soviet Union, has high potential but smaller funding. Its own space programs, some of a military nature, perform several functions. They offer a wide commercial launch service while continuing to support the ISS with several of their own modules. They also operate crewed and cargo spacecraft which continued after the US Shuttle program ended. They are developing a new multi-function Orel spacecraft for use in 2020 and have plans to perform human Moon missions as well.

=== European Space Agency ===
The European Space Agency has taken the lead in commercial uncrewed launches since the introduction of the Ariane 4 in 1988 but is in competition with NASA, Russia, Sea Launch (private), China, India, and others. The ESA-designed crewed shuttle Hermes and space station Columbus were under development in the late 1980s in Europe; however, these projects were canceled, and Europe did not become the third major "space power".

The European Space Agency has launched various satellites, has utilized the crewed Spacelab module aboard US shuttles, and has sent probes to comets and Mars. It also participates in ISS with its own module and the uncrewed cargo spacecraft ATV.

Currently, ESA has a program for the development of an independent multi-function crewed spacecraft CSTS scheduled for completion in 2018. Further goals include an ambitious plan called the Aurora Programme, which intends to send a human mission to Mars soon after 2030. A set of various landmark missions to reach this goal are currently under consideration. The ESA has a multi-lateral partnership and plans for spacecraft and further missions with foreign participation and co-funding. ESA is also developing the Galileo program which seeks to give independence to the EU from the American GPS.

=== China ===
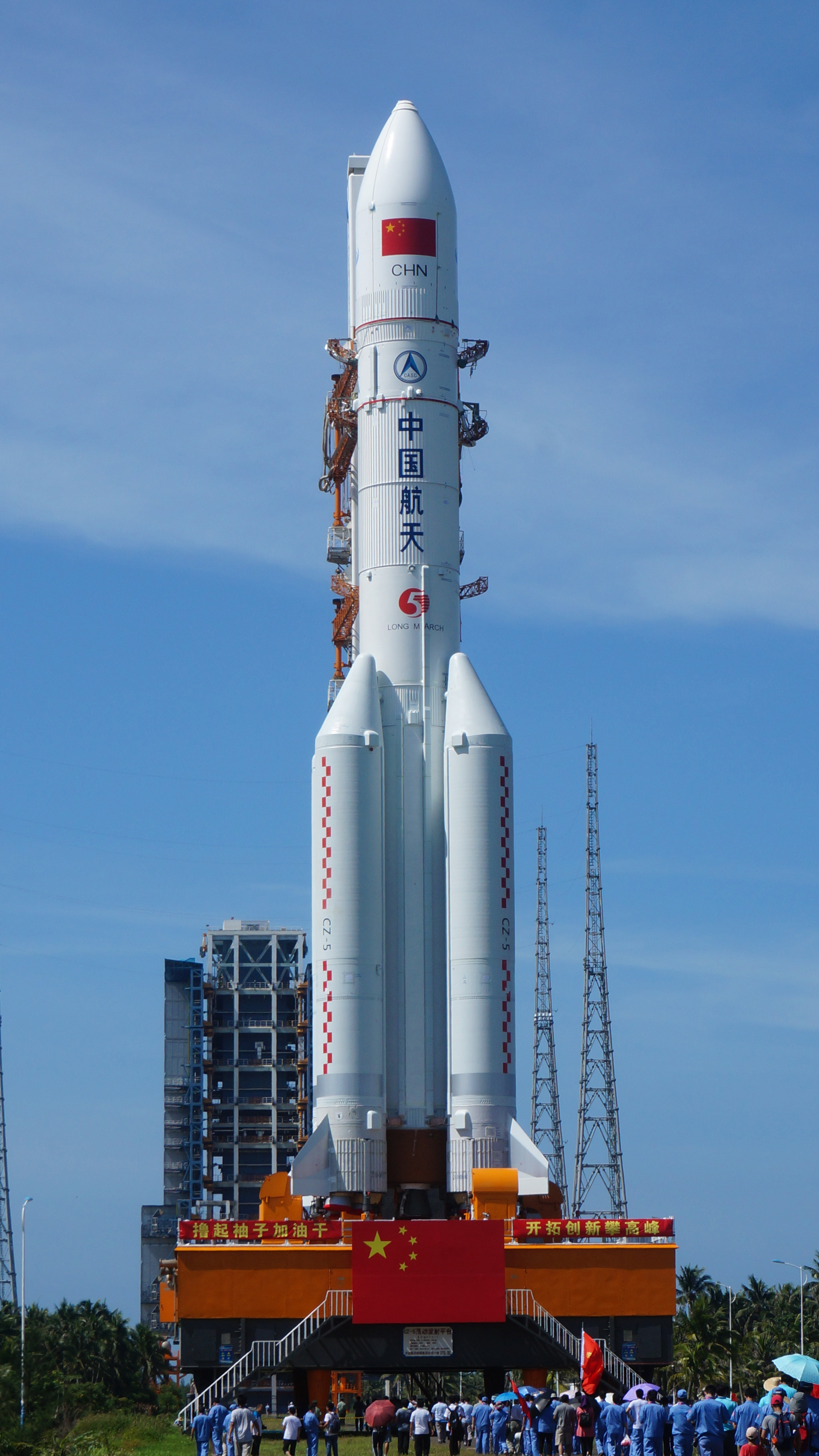
Long March 5, Chinese heavy-lift rocket

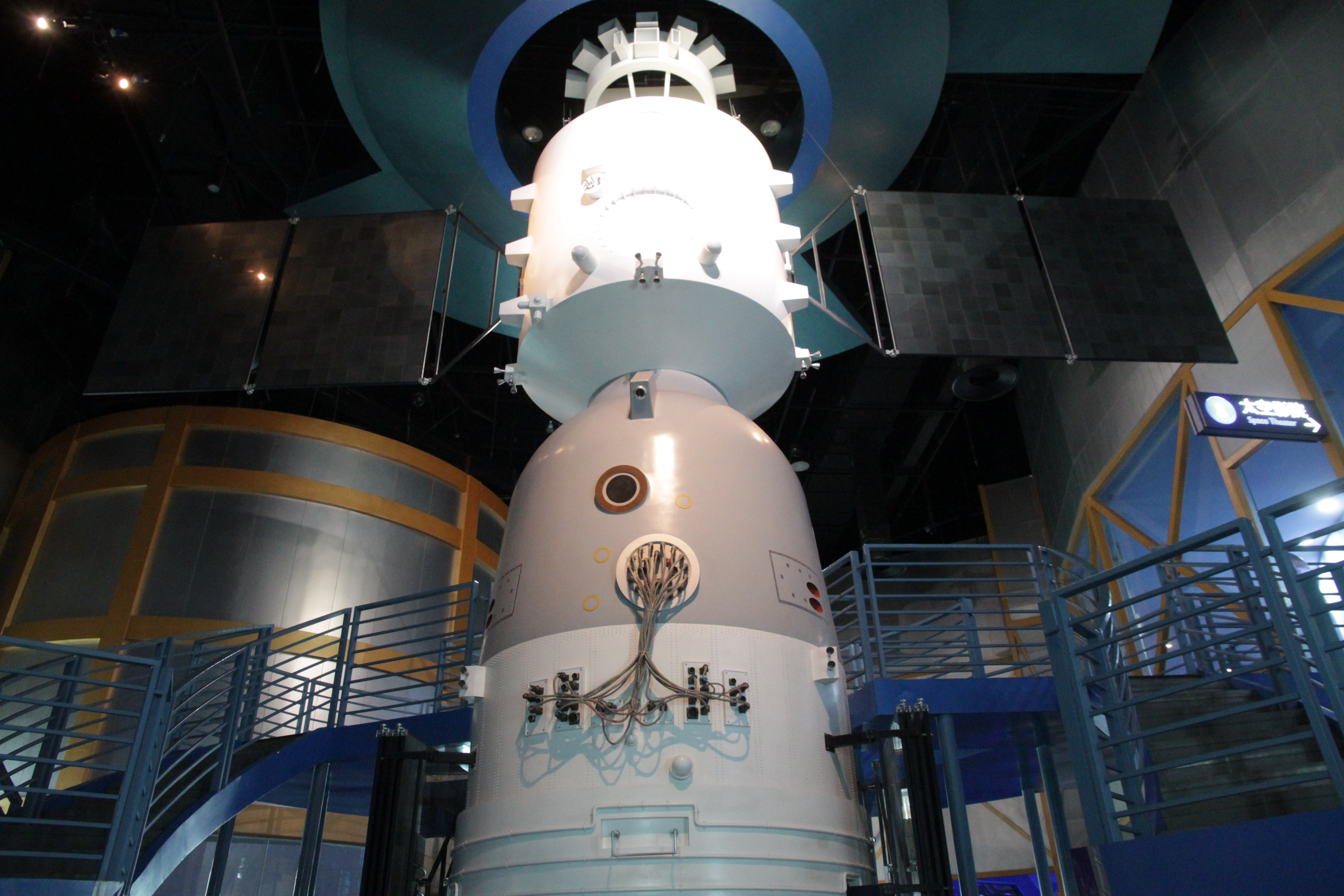
Shenzhou, China's crewed spacecraft

Since 1956 the Chinese have had a space program which was aided early on from 1957 to 1960 by the Soviets. "Dong Fang Hong I" was launched on 24 April 1970 and was the first satellite to be launched by the Chinese. With increased economic and technological strength in the following decades, especially since the early 21st century, China has made significant achievements in many aspects of space activities. It has developed a sizable family of Long March rockets, including Long March 5, the launch vehicle with the highest payload capacity in Asia since 2016. China launched more than 140 spaceflights between 2015 and 2020. China is operating multiple satellite systems, including communication, Earth imaging, weather forecast, ocean monitoring. BeiDou Navigation Satellite System, the satellite navigation system developed, launched, and operated by China, is one of the four core system providers of the International Committee on Global Navigation Satellite Systems.

The US Pentagon released a report in 2006, detailing concerns about China's growing presence in space, including its capability for military action. In 2007 China tested a ballistic missile designed to destroy satellites in orbit, which was followed by a US demonstration of a similar capability in 2008.

==== China Manned Space Program ====
The China Manned Space Program, China's human spaceflight program, began in 1992. Following Shenzhou 5, the first successful crewed spaceflight mission in 2003 which made China the third country with independent human spaceflight capability, China has developed critical capabilities including EVA, space docking and berthing and space station. The Tiangong space station, China's modular orbital station, became fully operational in November 2022 and has been continuously manned since then. It consists of three main modules: the Tianhe core module (launched in April 2021), Wentian module (July 2022), and Mengtian module (October 2022).

The station conducts scientific experiments include testing materials for lunar habitats and studying biological changes in microgravity, contributing to China's ambitions for a lunar research base by the 2030s. The station is designed to remain operational for at least a decade, with plans to expand it to six modules and host the Xuntian space telescope in the future.

==== Chinese Lunar Exploration Program ====
As the first step of distance outer space exploration, the Chinese Lunar Exploration Program was approved in 2004. It launched two lunar orbiters: Chang'e 1 and Chang'e 2 in 2007 and 2010 respectively. On 14 December 2013, China successfully soft-landed Chang'e 3 Moon lander and its rover Yutu on the Moon's surface, becoming the first Asian country to do so. This was followed by Chang'e 4, the first soft landing on the far side of the Moon, in 2019 and Chang'e 5, the first lunar sample return mission conducted by an Asian country, in 2020, marking the completion of the three goals (orbiting, landing, returning) of the first stage of the program. Starting from Chang'e 6, China wants to advance its plans in making a permanent International Lunar Research Station on the Moon.

==== Planetary Exploration of China ====
China began its first interplanetary exploration attempt in 2011 by sending Yinghuo-1, a Mars orbiter, in a joint mission with Russia. Yet it failed to leave Earth orbit due to the failure of the Russian launch vehicle. As a result, the Chinese space agency then embarked on its independent Mars mission. In July 2020, China launched Tianwen-1, which included an orbiter, a lander, and a rover, on a Long March 5 rocket to Mars. Tianwen-1 was inserted into Mars orbit on 10 February 2021, followed by a successful landing and deployment of the Zhurong rover on 14 May 2021, making China the second country in the world which successfully soft-landed a fully operational spacecraft on Mars surface.

=== France ===
Emmanuel Macron announced on 13 July 2019 the project to create a military command specialising in space, which would be based in Toulouse.

This command should be operational in September 2020 within the Air Force to become the Air and Space Force. Its purpose will be to strengthen France's space power in order to defend its satellites and deepen its knowledge of space. It will also aim to compete with other nations in this new place of strategic confrontation.

=== Japan ===
Japan's space agency, the Japan Aerospace Exploration Agency, is a major space player in Asia. While not maintaining a commercial launch service, Japan has deployed a module in the ISS and operates an uncrewed cargo spacecraft, the H-II Transfer Vehicle.

JAXA has plans to launch a Mars fly-by probe. Their lunar probe, SELENE, is touted as the most sophisticated lunar exploration mission in the post-Apollo era. Japan's Hayabusa probe was humankind's first sample return from an asteroid. IKAROS was the first operational solar sail.

Although Japan developed the HOPE-X, Kankoh-maru, and Fuji crewed capsule spacecraft, none of them have been launched. Japan's current ambition is to deploy a new crewed spacecraft by 2025 and to establish a Moon base by 2030.

=== Taiwan ===
The National Space Organization (NSPO; formerly known as the National Space Program Office) and the National Chung-Shan Institute of Science and Technology are the national civilian space agencies of the democratic industrialized developed country of Taiwan under the auspices of the Ministry of Science and Technology (Taiwan). The National Chung-Shan Institute of Science and Technology is involved in designing and building Taiwanese nuclear weapons, hypersonic missiles, spacecraft and rockets for launching satellites while the National Space Organization is involved in space exploration, satellite construction, and satellite development as well as related technologies and infrastructure (including the FORMOSAT series of Earth observation satellites similar to NASA along with DARPA {In-Q-Tel} such as Google Earth {Keyhole, Inc} or so forth) and related research in astronautics, quantum physics, materials science with microgravity, aerospace engineering, remote sensing, astrophysics, atmospheric science, information science, design and construction of indigenous Taiwanese satellites and spacecraft, launching satellites and space probes into low Earth orbit. Additionally, a state of the art crewed spaceflight program is currently in development in Taiwan and is designed to compete directly with the crewed programs of China, United States and Russia. Active research is currently undergoing in the development and deployment of space-based weapons for the defense of national security in Taiwan.

=== India ===
In 1962, India established a space program earlier known as INCOSPAR. Prime Minister Jawaharlal Nehru placed INCOSPAR under Department of atomic energy. Vikram Sarabhai was its chairmen and also known as the father of Indian space program. It was renamed as ISRO(Indian Space Research Organization) in 1969. India launched its first rocket, Nike-Apache on November 21, 1963, in Thumba, whose parts were famously transported from bicycles and bullock cart. In 1971, ISRO set up SDSC(Satish Dhawan Space Centre) in Sriharikota. In 1972, ISRO was bought under Department of Space(DOS). In 1975, ISRO launched its first satellite, Aryabhata. ISRO developed its first launch vehicle, SLV-3, first flew in 1979 from SDSC. In 1981, ISRO launched of experimental satellite APPLE which paved the way for INSAT program started in 1982, supporting weather, telecom and broadcasting services.

In 1994, the first flight of PSLV(Polar Satellite Launch Vehicle) was done. i became the most common launch vehicle made by ISRO. In 21st century, ISRO accomplished major milestone from lunar program to interplanetary missions.

==== Chandrayaan program ====
On 22 October 2008, ISRO launched its first lunar mission called Chandrayaan-1. It weighed 590kg. It was launched by ISRO's PSLV-XL from Satish Dhawan Space Centre, Sriharikota. It was designed to orbit moon and conduct high resolution remote sensing. It was carrying 11 scientific instrument. In November 2009, ISRO's Moon Impact Probe(MIP) and NASA's Moon Mineralogy Mapper detected water molecules on moon.

On 22 July 2019, ISRO launched its second lunar mission, Chandrayaan-2 from SDCS by GSLV MKIII-M1. It was an orbiter as well lander mission while also having rover with it. The name of lander was Vikram and the name of rover was Pragyan. The orbiter was designed to orbit the moon while Vikram was designed to do a soft landing on south pole of moon. The orbiter was carrying 8 scientific payloads. The Vikram was carrying 4 scientific payloads and Pragyan was carrying 2 scientific payloads. On 20 August 2019, The orbiter was successfully placed on lunar orbit. ISRO lost the contact with Vikram when Vikram was at 2.1 km altitude. The mission came out to be a partial success.

On July 14 2023, ISRO launched its third lunar mission called chandrayaan-3 launched from SDSC by LVM-3. It was having propulsion module, Vikram lander and Pragyan rover. it was follow up of Chandrayaan-2. The vikram was designed to do a soft landing on south pole of moon. On 22nd August 2023, Vikram lander successfully landed on south pole. India became first country to land on south pole and fourth country to land on moon. The propulsion module was having one scientific payload. The Vikram lander was carrying 3 scientific payload while Pragyan rover was carrying 2 scientific payload. ISRO also demonstrated the hop experiment on moon becoming the second lander to do that. It collected several scientific data. It was designed for 1 lunar day or 14 earth days.

==== Mars Orbiter Mission (MOM) ====
Mars Orbiter Mission was ISRO's first interplanetary mission to mars. It was launched on November 5, 2013 by PSLV-C25 from SDSC, Sriharikota. It was carrying five scientific instrument. Though It was designed to orbit mars for 6 months, MOM completed 7 years in its orbit. ISRO lost the contact on September 7, 2021. the cost for MOM was approximately 72 million dollar making it one of the most cost effective mission. ISRO also became the first agency to reach mars on its first attempt.

=== Other nations ===
Cosmonauts and astronauts from other nations have flown in space, beginning with the flight of Vladimir Remek, a Czech, on a Soviet spacecraft on March 2, 1978. As of November 6, 2013, a total of 536 people from 38 countries have gone into space according to the FAI guideline.

=== Private Companies ===
SpaceX Crew-2 Dragon Endeavor approaching the ISS

==== SpaceX (USA) ====
Space Exploration Technologies Corp., doing business as SpaceX, is an American conglomerate which is a aerospace manufacturer and provider of space transportation, telecommunications, and artificial intelligence (AI) services, headquartered at the Starbase development site in Starbase, Texas. The company operates three primary segments: Space, which develops and flies the Falcon 9, Falcon Heavy, and Starship launch vehicles, as well as the Dragon spacecraft, and conducts more orbital launches annually than any other launch provider (including national programs); Connectivity, which operates the Starlink satellite constellation and satellite-based high-speed broadband internet service; and AI, conducted through its wholly owned subsidiary SpaceX Super Intelligence, which develops the Grok family of large language models (LLMs) and related products, operates the social network X (formerly Twitter), and builds and runs large-scale data centers.

The company is credited with advances in rocket propulsion, reusable launch vehicles, human spaceflight, and satellite constellation technology. The company's largest customers include NASA, the National Reconnaissance Office, Axiom Space, SES, Eutelsat, and OneWeb. In 2026, SpaceX also began selling computing capacity at its Colossus data centers to Anthropic, Google, and Reflection AI. According to a Schedule 13G filed in August 2026, Elon Musk beneficially owns 48.4% of SpaceX's Class A common stock on an as-converted basis, including options and restricted shares. Through his Class B super-voting stock, he held about 82% of the voting power after the IPO, or 84.4% counting shares underlying his options. SpaceX was founded in 2002 by Elon Musk with the goal of reducing spaceflight costs, improving the reliability of access to outer space for ordinary humans, and colonizing Mars. In 2008, after three failed attempts between 2006 and 2008 that almost pushed the company to bankruptcy, SpaceX successfully launched the Falcon 1 into orbit, becoming the first private company to develop and launch a liquid-fueled rocket to orbit. In 2010, the company launched the Falcon 9 launch vehicle and the Dragon 1 spacecraft to fulfill NASA's Commercial Orbital Transportation Services (COTS) contracts for cargo deliveries to the International Space Station (ISS). In 2012, SpaceX began flying Commercial Resupply Services missions to the ISS, becoming the first private company to successfully dock with the station, and started developing technologies to make the Falcon 9 first stage reusable. In 2015, Falcon 9 flight 20 was the first successful landing of an orbital-class rocket's first stage and the company's SES-10 completed the first reflight of an orbital-class booster in 2017. After a decade of development, Falcon Heavy, which consists of three Falcon 9-derived boosters, made its maiden flight in 2018. As of May 2026, Falcon 9 launches averaged approximately three missions per week, and SpaceX had completed approximately 650 orbital launches, more than 540 of them on flight-proven Falcon rockets.

SpaceX is developing a fully reusable rocket named Starship. It consists of a first stage named Super Heavy and a second stage also named Starship.

==== Blue Origin ====
Blue Origin made the first reusable space-capable rocket booster, New Shepard (it is suborbital, Falcon 9 was the first orbital). They also originally had the idea of landing rocket boosters on ships at sea; however, SpaceX replicated their idea and did it first. They lead the national team, which is designing a lunar lander and transfer vehicle (Integrated Lander Vehicle). They will contribute by modifying their Blue Moon lunar lander.

==== Bigelow Aerospace ====
Bigelow Aerospace made the first commercial module in space (BEAM). They also designed and manufactured the first inflatable habitats in space (Genesis I and Genesis II). They also plan to make the first commercial space station around the moon (Lunar Depot), perhaps the first ever.

==== Northrop Grumman ====
They make commercial resupply runs to the ISS with their Cygnus spacecraft. They also helped develop non-commercial spacecraft during the space race (Apollo LM as Grumman). They also are a part of the national team, led by Blue Origin which is designing a lunar lander and transfer vehicle (Integrated Lander Vehicle), partly based on Cygnus.

==== United Launch Alliance ====
United Launch Alliance, LLC (ULA) is an American launch service provider formed in December 2006 as a joint venture between Lockheed Martin Space and Boeing Defense, Space & Security. The company designs, assembles, sells and launches rockets. The company uses rocket engines, solid rocket boosters, and other components supplied by other companies.

When founded, the company inherited the Atlas V rocket from Lockheed Martin and the Delta rocket family from Boeing. As of 2024, the Delta family has been retired and the Atlas V is in the process of being retired. ULA began development of the Vulcan Centaur in 2014 as replacement for both the Atlas and Delta rocket families. The Vulcan Centaur completed its maiden flight in January 2024.

The primary customers of ULA are the Department of Defense (DoD) and NASA, but it also serves commercial clients.

==== Arianespace ====
Arianespace SA is a French company founded in March 1980 as the world's first commercial launch service provider. It operates the Ariane 6, a medium-to-heavy-lift rocket. Arianespace is a subsidiary of ArianeGroup, a joint venture between Airbus and Safran.

European space launches involve collaboration between private industry and government agencies. Arianespace is responsible for marketing Ariane 6 launch services, preparing missions, and managing customer relations. At the Guiana Space Centre (CSG) in French Guiana, the company oversees teams that integrate and prepare launch vehicles. The launch infrastructure at CSG is owned by the European Space Agency, while the site itself is managed by CNES, France's national space agency. The Ariane 6 rocket is designed and manufactured by ArianeGroup.

As of October 2025, Arianespace had conducted 355 missions and launched over 1,100 satellites across a span of 45 years. Its first commercial launch, Spacenet 1, took place on 23 May 1984. In addition to its operations at CSG, Arianespace maintains its headquarters in Évry-Courcouronnes, a suburb of Paris.

==== Rocket Lab ====
Rocket Lab Corporation (formerly Rocket Lab Limited, then Rocket Lab USA, Inc.) is a publicly traded aerospace manufacturer and launch service provider. Its Electron orbital rocket launches small satellites and has successfully completed over 75 missions as of January 2026, making it the most prolific small-lift launch vehicle in operation globally. A suborbital variant of Electron, called HASTE (Hypersonic Accelerator Suborbital Test Electron), was developed as a testbed to advance hypersonic technology development, while the next-generation reusable Neutron medium-lift launch vehicle is in development to support constellation deployment, interplanetary missions, and human spaceflight. The company is a supplier of satellite components such as star trackers, reaction wheels, solar panels, electric propulsion systems, software-defined radios, composite structures, separation systems, and electro-optical and infrared (EO/IR) sensors, as well as flight and ground software. The company also manufactures satellite buses and complete spacecraft as part of its strategic vision to become a vertically integrated, end-to-end space company.

Rocket Lab was founded by Peter Beck in 2006 in New Zealand. In 2009, it became the first private company in the Southern Hemisphere to reach space with the successful launch of its Ātea-1 sounding rocket. In 2013 it set up headquarters in Huntington Beach, California, before later moving to Long Beach in 2020. After establishing its U.S. presence, the company raised venture capital for the development of its Electron orbital rocket, which reached space on its maiden flight in 2017, and orbit on its second flight in 2018. In 2020, the company launched its first self-built and designed satellite, First Light, which is derived from Electron's kick stage.

The company is a major spacecraft manufacturer, building and operating satellites for commercial constellation operators such as Globalstar, as well as government customers like the Space Development Agency.

Since 2020, Rocket Lab acquired seven companies, including Sinclair Interplanetary in April 2020, Advanced Solutions, Inc. (ASI) in October 2021, Planetary Systems Corporation (PSC) in December 2021, SolAero Holdings, Inc. in January 2022, Geost, LLC in August 2025, Mynaric AG in April 2026, and Motiv Space Systems in May 2026.

In August 2021, the company went public on the Nasdaq stock exchange through a special-purpose acquisition company (SPAC) merger. As of May 2025, the company had over 2,600 employees globally, with more than 700 based in New Zealand.

== See also ==
- History of Space in Africa
- History of aviation
- List of crewed spacecraft
- Timeline of spaceflight
- Timeline of Solar System exploration
- Timeline of space exploration
- Human presence in space

== Bibliography ==
- Benson, Charles Dunlap & Compton, William David (1983). Living and Working in Space: A History of Skylab. NASA Scientific and Technical Information Office. OCLC 8114293. SP-4208.
