= Frontier Radio =

Family of software-defined radios

The Frontier Radio is a family of software-defined radios developed by the Johns Hopkins University Applied Physics Laboratory (APL) for spacecraft communications, navigation, and radiometric measurements. Developed for near-Earth and deep-space applications, the family includes the original Frontier Radio, Frontier Radio Lite (FR Lite), and subsequent multilingual and configurable architectures.

Frontier Radio technology has been used on multiple spacecraft missions, including NASA's Van Allen Probes, Parker Solar Probe, Double Asteroid Redirection Test (DART), IMAP, Europa Clipper, and Emirates Mars Mission. Commercial derivatives of Frontier Radio Lite are manufactured by Rocket Lab under the Frontier-S, Frontier-X, Frontier-C, and Frontier-L product names.

More recent developments include NASA's Polylingual Experimental Terminal (PExT), launched in 2025, which demonstrated communications across government and commercial satellite relay networks using a Frontier Radio-based communications payload.

== History ==
=== Parents and predecessors ===
The creation of the FR family was predated by the transceivers built for the New Horizons, TIMED, and CONTOUR spacecraft, all of which required lightweight transceivers with low power consumption. These efforts were successful; for example, the transceiver for New Horizons managed to save 12 W from total mission power and ended up being a mission-enabler. Based on results from these missions, APL sought an opportunity to build a general-purpose radio with even lower SWaP (Size, Weight, and Power) as a software-defined radio (SDR) platform usable by any aerospace organization. The SDR platform would accommodate transceivers and transponders with higher data-rate return link capabilities and better radiation tolerance than previous radios. APL brought the idea before NASA, who approved further research.

=== Frontier Radio history ===
The first iteration of the Frontier Radio (FR) to fly was on the near space Van Allen Probes (VAP) mission. It was used because of its high radiation tolerance, low SWaP, and long lifetime. A deep space version of the FR flew on the Parker Solar Probe (PSP) mission in 2018. This version was modified for the PSP mission with updates such as software enhancements to improve downlink frame rates, RF hardware to operate at the higher frequency X and Ka bands, and hardware enhancements to increase processing capacity. The FR also flew on NASA's Double Asteroid Redirection Test (DART) missions, where it featured improvements such as support for higher data rates at X-Band. Other recent missions to incorporate FR also include Emirates Mars Mission, IMAP, Europa Clipper, and Dragonfly.

Other missions needed radios with less size, mass, and power consumption, and did not require the full robustness of FR. This led to the development of Frontier Radio Lite, a much smaller radio for resource-constrained missions; this is the version of the radio that has been commercialized with Rocket Lab. The biggest change was a reduction in the maximum data rates and the signal sensitivity, allowing a lower power consumption, while some radiation tolerance was sacrificed to achieve better size, weight, and power. Next came the Frontier Radio Virtual Radio, intermediate between the FR and the FR Lite. It combines the robust nature and processing power of the original radio with a reprogrammable design and more modern architecture used by the FR Lite.

== Versions ==
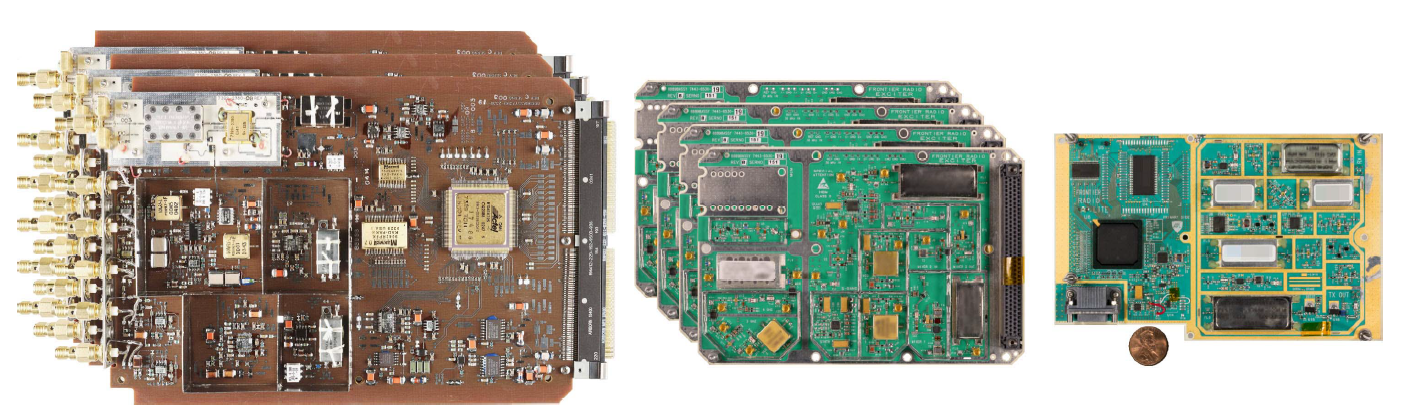
A comparison of the New Horizons radio boards (2005) vs. PSP radio boards (2010) vs. FR Lite radio board (2015).

=== Heritage Frontier Radio ===
Following the launch of the New Horizons mission and its low SWaP radio, NASA funded more research into other small, highly reliable radio products for future missions by APL, this time utilizing software-defined platforms. The grant led to the creation of the heritage Frontier Radio (FR), built for near and deep space applications.

==== Types ====
The heritage FR has two main versions: a near space radio that operates at S-band, as used on the VAP mission, and a deep space version that operates at X/Ka-band, as used on the PSP mission. Both versions use the same core infrastructure with some improvements over the first version that flew on VAP. These include reduction of SWaP, improved robustness, lower noise, higher speed signal conversion and processing, and better signal acquisition and tracking.

==== Key features ====
The FR has a separate interface board so that the hardware can be customized to each mission without having to build a brand new radio. Certain features can also be reconfigured in flight, like in-band channel assignment, bit rate, loop bandwidths, and coding formats, and modulation schemes. Its circuits are designed to be highly reliable and fault tolerant, taking into account vacuum, high radiation, and extreme temperature environments. It can withstand total ionizing doses (TID) of up to 100 krad (1 kGy) and has single event latch-up (SEL, or a latch-up caused by a single event upset) immunity of 85 MeV-cm2/mg of linear energy transfer (LET).

==== Limitations ====
The FR is not reprogrammable. It is also the physically largest radio in the family.

=== Frontier Radio Lite ===
The Frontier Radio Lite is the smaller version of its sibling, the Frontier Radio, fitting all of its systems onto a single card. Originally an S-band radio, FR Lite was the first in the family to be reprogrammable, and is designed for missions with high risk tolerance and quick schedules. It is the lowest SWaP radio in the Frontier family, making it ideal for small-sat and cube-sat missions.

The Frontier Radio Lite architecture was licensed to Rocket Lab for commercial production. Rocket Lab initially developed S-band and X-band derivatives, marketed as Frontier-S and Frontier-X, and subsequently expanded the product family to include C-band and L-band configurations. These commercial products are based on the FR Lite technology rather than the later multilingual radio architecture.

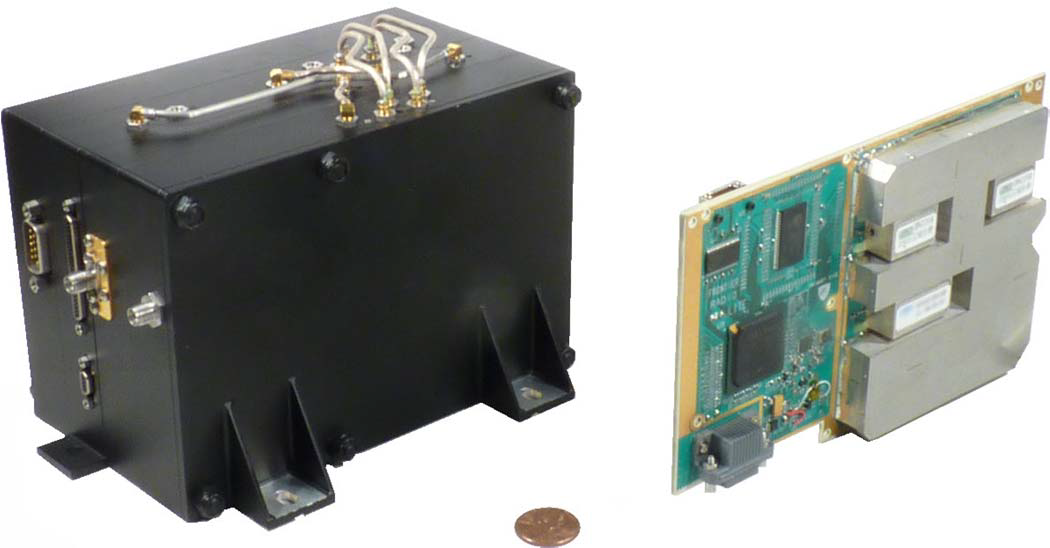
The FR from the VAP mission (left) with the FR Lite (right).

==== Types ====
Two versions of FR Lite have been designed and built. The first is a two-way radio operating at S-band, and the second is a L-band receiver for GPS L1 & L2, renamed the Extensible Global Navigation System (EGNS). The S-band version of this radio has been transferred to industry and can be purchased from Rocket Lab under the name Frontier-S.

==== Key features ====
The FR Lite uses a reprogrammable field-programmable gate array (FPGA) instead of a dedicated application-specific integrated circuit (ASIC), greatly decreasing development cost and allowing increased flexibility. Its mass and volume are less than 25% of the FR's, and its receive and transmit modes use less than 30% of the total FR power. These improvements were accomplished by moving a number of analog hardware sections into firmware, sharing components of the circuit for the up and down conversions of frequencies, improved power regulation design, and a number of smaller changes.

==== Limitations ====
The FR Lite sacrifices some of its radiation tolerance and SEL immunity in order to achieve its low SWaP; it can only withstand TID of 40 krads and has a 20% reduction in SEL immunity compared to the FR.

=== Frontier Radio Multi Lingual ===
The Frontier Radio Multi Lingual (FR ML) was developed to accommodate high-throughput spacecraft communications across multiple government and commercial satellite networks. Developed in connection with NASA's Space Communications and Navigation (SCaN) program, the architecture supports multiple communications waveforms and protocols, including CCSDS and DVB-S2.

The multilingual architecture was incorporated into NASA's Polylingual Experimental Terminal (PExT) demonstration. The flight experiment investigated interoperability across different satellite relay networks using a common software-defined communications terminal.

==== Types ====
The FR ML currently comes in one version, with Ka up- and down-conversion.

==== Key features ====
The FR ML features a more advanced FPGA than previous FR variants, allowing support for DVB-S2, OFDMA, and CCSDS waveforms. Improvements in processing power, predistortion, and RF front end linearity enable support of uplink and downlink data rates in excess of 1 GBps. The radio is tolerant to 100 krad TID and single event effect immunity to 72 MeV-cm2/mg. A supervisor co-processor also enables complete in-flight reportability, of not just software but firmware as well.

==== Limitations ====
High power consumption limits FR Mk2p ML usage on some small-sat missions, though lower baseline power configurations are available depending on the mission needs.

==== PExT Flight Demonstration ====
The Frontier Radio Multi Lingual architecture was used in NASA's Polylingual Experimental Terminal (PExT), a wideband communications technology demonstration developed by the Johns Hopkins Applied Physics Laboratory with NASA's Space Communications and Navigation (SCaN) program.

PExT launched on July 23, 2025, aboard York Space Systems' BARD spacecraft. The demonstration investigated the use of a software-defined communications terminal to communicate across government and commercial satellite relay networks.

During its primary mission, PExT successfully demonstrated communications through NASA's Tracking and Data Relay Satellite System (TDRSS) and commercial satellite networks operated by Viasat and SES Space & Defense. NASA announced completion of the primary demonstration objectives in December 2025.

Following the successful demonstration, NASA extended PExT operations through April 2027 to investigate additional communications capabilities, including direct-to-Earth links and network service orchestration.

PExT received a 2026 R&D 100 Award in the IT/Electrical category.

=== Frontier Radio Mk2p Multi-Lingual ===
The Frontier Radio Mk2p Multi-Lingual builds on the multilingual communications architecture demonstrated by PExT, integrating its capabilities into a compact, configurable radio platform intended for a broader range of spacecraft applications.

The radio supports communications using Consultative Committee for Space Data Systems (CCSDS) waveforms and commercial satellite communications standards, including DVB-S2. Its modular architecture accommodates different RF configurations, including K/Ka-band operation and build-time selectable VHF, UHF, L-, S-, C-, and X-band options. Depending on the modem configuration, up to three frequency bands can be supported simultaneously.

The K/Ka-band configuration has a mass of less than 0.8 kg and dimensions of approximately 10 × 10 × 7 cm. Published specifications identify return-link transmission rates up to approximately 880 Mbps and forward-link reception rates up to approximately 230 Mbps, with power consumption dependent on operating mode and configuration. Like FR ML, the radio is tolerant to 100 krad TID and single event effect immunity to 72 MeV-cm2/mg.

An optional Linux-based general processing module is being developed to enable additional onboard processing applications, including delay-tolerant networking, navigation, and signal analysis. The design incorporates radiation-resilience measures and configurable component-quality approaches for different mission requirements.

The Mk2p ML architecture is being refined for commercial applications, incorporating developments and lessons from the PExT flight demonstration. The first mission slated to fly this new architecture is NASA's DAVINCI mission to Venus. APL is currently seeking commercialization partners for this technology.

=== Commercial Derivatives: Rocket Lab Frontier Radios ===
The Frontier-S and Frontier-X are a variants of the Frontier Radio Lite manufactured by United States-based aerospace company Rocket Lab, who licensed the design in 2021 for commercial use. Currently, the Frontier-S has flown on Rocket Lab's Photon Pathstone spacecraft, launched in March 2021, on the Photon spacecraft used for the CAPSTONE mission in March 2022 as well as a private mission to Venus. Rocket Lab also produces a "deep-space" variant with additional features.

The Frontier-X is an X-band version of the FR Lite, designed and licensed specifically for Rocket Lab. It will be first flown on the upcoming NASA SIMPLEx mission to Mars EscaPADE

=== Comparison ===
Parameter	Heritage Frontier Radio	FR Lite	FR ML / PExT	FR Mk2p ML	Unit
Frequency Band	S / X / Ka	L/S/C/X	K/Ka	K/Ka; optional VHF, UHF, L, S, C, X	
Volume	2050	320*	960*	700	cubic centimeters (cc)
Mass	2.1	0.4*	1.0*	0.59	kilograms (kg)
Temperature	-35 to +60	-35 to +60	-35 to +60	-35 to +70	Celsius (C)
Voltage	22-36	22-35	22-36	22–36	Volts (V)
Power, Rx Only†	6	1.5 (0.35 Standby)	5-25	5-24	Watts (W)
Power, Full Duplex†	9.7 (X-band)	6.8 w/ on-board 1-W SSPA (S-band)	10–35	10-32	Watts (W)
Rx / Tx Bands	2 / 2	1 / 1	2 / 2‡	3/3	-
Receive Rate	1–1 M	10 M	10-1000 M	1-1000 M	samples per second (sps)
Transmit Rate	10–150 M	10–100 M	10–1000 M	10-1000 M	sps
Rx Sensitivity	-160	-150	-140 (est.)	-155	dBm
Noise Figure (Integrated LNA)	2.5	5.5	2.0	2.0	decibels (dB)
FPGA Device	RTAX4000	ProASIC3E 3000	PolarFire	PolarFire	-
Reprogrammable	No	Yes	Yes	Yes	-
Interfaces	SpaceWire	SpaceWire	SpaceWire, Ethernet	SpaceWire, Ethernet, LVDS, RS-422	-
Non-Volatile Memory Storage	-	-	256	512-1024	gigabyte (GB)
RAM	< 1	< 1	8	8	GB
Radiation (TID)	100	40	100	100	krad
Radiation (SEL for LET)	>85	>68	>72	>72	MeV-cm^{2}/mg

*Bare slices only; total volume/mass depends on packaging.

†Frontier Radio & FR VR numbers include an ovenized oscillator and +28V bus power converter unit with ~1.4-W quiescent draw and ~80% efficiency vs. a lower-power TCXO and lower-voltage 6-12V bus power on FR Lite.

‡Two transmit channels switchable but not simultaneous.

== Spaceflight Applications ==
Frontier Radio variants have been incorporated into spacecraft communications systems for near-Earth, heliophysics, and planetary missions.

The original Frontier Radio was used aboard NASA's Van Allen Probes, launched in 2012, and Parker Solar Probe, launched in 2018. Other applications include the Emirates Mars Mission Hope spacecraft, and NASA's Double Asteroid Redirection Test (DART).

NASA's Europa Clipper mission, launched October 14, 2024, uses a Frontier Radio-based telecommunications system for spacecraft communications and radio science investigations. NASA's Interstellar Mapping and Acceleration Probe (IMAP), launched September 24, 2025, also incorporates Frontier Radio technology.

Additional applications include NASA's Dragonfly mission to Saturn's moon Titan and commercially produced derivatives used in Rocket Lab spacecraft.

In July 2025, the Frontier Radio Multi Lingual architecture was flown aboard the BARD spacecraft as part of NASA's PExT demonstration, which completed its primary objectives in December 2025.

An L-band version of FR Lite (EGNS) flew on a Cubesat mission in 2019.

The Emirates Mars Mission HOPE uses a FR transponder.

The Europa Clipper mission uses an FR transponder both for communication and gravity science.

The FR will also fly on NASA's New Frontiers Dragonfly (Titan space probe) mission set to launch in 2028.

== See also ==
- Electra (radio) - A UHF transponder for satellite to surface communication
- Small Deep Space Transponder - another small spacecraft transponder designed by JPL and produced by General Dynamics.
- Iris (transponder) - a transponder smaller than SDST developed by JPL for use in cubesats
