= Snailbrook, Texas =

- Interactive map of Snailbrook, Texas
- Coordinates: 30°09′17″N 97°24′16″W
- Country: United States
- State: Texas
- County: Bastrop

Population (2023)
  - Total: 12
- Time zone: UTC−6 (Central (CST))
  - Summer (DST): UTC−5 (CDT)
- ZIP code: 78602
- Area codes: 512, 737

Snailbrook is an unincorporated company town under construction in Bastrop County within the Greater Austin region of Texas. It is intended as a company town for the employees of The Boring Company and SpaceX. It is based on the initiative of Elon Musk, who has acquired large areas of land in Texas for himself and his companies. According to The Guardian, the settlement had 12 inhabitants in 2023.

== Location ==
The town is located on the Colorado River east of Austin and close to Bastrop. It has a Boring Company production hall and a SpaceX site where receiving technology for its Starlink satellite communications network is manufactured. The Tesla Gigafactory Texas is located just 13 mi (21 km) to the west. A site of the neurotechnology company Neuralink is also located in the immediate vicinity. A moderation center for the X social network acquired by Musk is also to be built near Austin.

== History ==
Since around 2020, entrepreneur Elon Musk has increasingly relocated his company's activities from California to Texas following disputes with the local authorities in California in the COVID-19 pandemic. In Texas, businesses benefit from more favorable tax rates and fewer regulations. As a result, Musk also increasingly shifted his politics from the Democrats to the Republicans, who dominate Texas. Musk also complained about the lack of housing for the employees of his companies in the Austin region. He therefore began to acquire land in Texas in Greater Austin on a large scale via letterbox companies and his companies. Around 35,000 acres (14,000 ha) of land just outside Austin were acquired by Musk and his companies with a value of $2.5 billion.

The project to build his own company town began in 2021 according to reports by the Wall Street Journal. Musk's then-girlfriend Grimes and Kanye West are also said to have been involved in the planning. The name Snailbrook alludes to the Boring Company's stated goal of building drills that can bore tunnels faster than a snail can move. Under the name Project Amazing, there are also plans to build a dense workers' housing estate of 110 houses, along with street names that match the activities of the Boring Company, such as Cutterhead Crossing, Waterjet Way, and Porpoise Place. There were also plans to build a Montessori school for the children of workers and even to establish a university nearby. The housing was said to be affordable with rent of $800 per month, but employees must agree to move out within one month if laid off.

In mid-2024, satellite images showed the completion of several residential buildings next to the two factories and a couple of residential houses. The site also has a pool, a tennis court and two pickleball courts.

The Montessori school opened in August, 2024 with a planned capacity of 50 students.

== See also ==
- Starbase, Texas
- City of Starbase Incorporation election
