= City of Starbase Incorporation election =

2025 local referendum in Texas

- May 3, 2025
- To Incorporate the Community of Starbase, Texas.

Results
Choice	Votes	%
Yes	212	97.25%
No	6	2.75%
Valid votes	218	100.00%
Invalid or blank votes	0	0.00%
Total votes	218	100.00%

The City of Starbase Incorporation election was held on May 3, 2025, to determine if the City of Starbase would be established from an unincorporated area in Cameron County, Texas. The proposal to incorporate the city passed 212–6; formal incorporation of the city occurred on May 20. Only registered voters living in the boundary of the city were eligible to vote in the election, a total of 283 people.

Early voting in the election began on April 22, and concluded on April 29.

== Background ==
The Boca Chica area was considered as a potential location for SpaceX Starbase in 2012. In August 2014, SpaceX announced that they had selected that area as the location that they would build the complex and rocket launch facility. In 2021, Elon Musk, the founder of SpaceX, announced plans to incorporate the area as an individual city. Musk began encouraging people to move to the location as early as 2021.

In December 2024, SpaceX sent a letter to county judge Eddie Treviño Jr., containing an incorporation petition signed by area residents; under Texas state law, if the county judge concludes that the petition meets the legal requirements, they are legally obliged to order an incorporation election for the proposal. Treviño said that his administration would formally review the petition. The number of employees who were employed by SpaceX reportedly increased to a high enough level for the petition to receive the proper amount of signatures. On February 10, Treviño announced that the petition had received enough valid signatures to be certified for the May 3 election. The location has just over 500 residents, with 260 of them being SpaceX employees. The vast majority of the land is also owned by the company.

The notice of election was officially published on April 4, 2025.

== Impact ==
The election result established the City of Starbase as a Type C municipality, and the city government will be a Mayor–council government, with a mayor and a two-member commission. The purpose is also to allow streamlined work efficiency, following Musk's announcement that he wished to move the SpaceX headquarters to Texas. Environmentalists and some locals oppose the proposal, over concerns that SpaceX will be unable to minimize the impact on the local area. The election ballot will also have the election for mayor and two commissioners, who are all running unopposed.

== Results ==
=== Referendum ===
City of Starbase Incorporation election
Choice	Votes	%
For	212	97.25
Against	6	2.75
Total	218	100.00
Registered voters/turnout	283	77.03

=== Local government ===
The results of the following elections would have been discounted if the result of the election had been "no".

==== Mayor ====
2025 Starbase, Texas mayoral election
Candidate	Votes	%
Bobby Peden	216	100.00
Total votes	216	100.00

==== Commission ====
Both candidates ran unopposed, as the city commission only has two spots.

2025 Starbase, Texas Commission election
Candidate	Votes	%
Jenna Petrzelka	188	86.24 (Note: As a percentage of all 218 ballots cast; each ballot could vote for either, both or neither of the commission candidates.)
Jordan Buss	177	81.19
Total votes	365	100.00

== See also ==
- Snailbrook, Texas
