= Small Deep Space Transponder =

Emitter used on several NASA probes

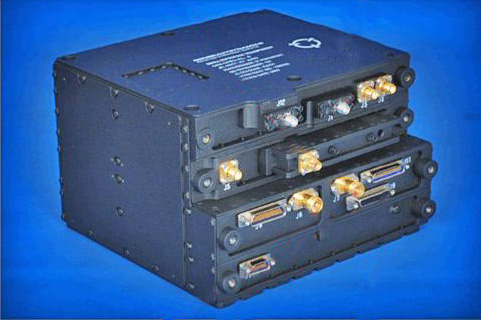
Small Deep Space Transponder

The Small Deep Space Transponder is a transponder designed by JPL specifically for deep space probes. It unifies a number of communication functions - receiver, command detector, telemetry modulator, exciters, beacon tone generator, and control functions - into one 3-kg package. The SDST is designed to handle X band uplink and both X band and Ka band downlink. JPL estimates that performing the same functions with separate units (as was done previously) requires over twice the mass and 4 or 5 individual subassemblies.

== Functions ==
The capabilities of the SDST include:

- X-band receiver/downconverter capable of carrier tracking at or below −156 dBm.
- Command detector unit function.
- Telemetry modulation function.
- X- and Ka-band exciters.
- Beacon mode operation.
- Coherent and noncoherent operation choice.
- X- and Ka-band ranging.
- Differential one-way ranging (DOR) for both X-band and Ka-band.
- Command and Data Handling (C&DH) communication via MIL-STD-1553.
- Data interface via EIA-422 (also known as RS-422).
- External ports for temperature sensors.
- External port for an analog signal.

== Missions ==
SDST has been used in the following missions:

- Deep Space 1. This was a developmental mission that used the transponder for the first time, as part of an effort to qualify new technologies for flight.
- Deep Impact
- Dawn used a pair of SDSTs
- Mars Exploration Rovers
- Mars Reconnaissance Orbiter
- MESSENGER
- STEREO
- Spitzer Space Telescope
- A pair of SDSTs were used in the cruise stage of Phoenix (spacecraft). The lander used only UHF communication.
- The Mars Science Laboratory includes two SDSTs, one on the descent stage and one on the lander itself. The SDST on the descent stage was the main transponder for the cruise and landing portions of the flight, with the SDST on the rover as a backup. The descent stage crashed after lowering the rover, and the SDST on the lander became the active transponder.

As many tightly constrained, high-performance systems, the SDST has a number of idiosyncrasies in operation. However, as the Dawn telecom 'lessons learned' section points out, the use of common hardware such as the SDST allows knowledge of these characteristics from previous projects.

For cubesat missions, the SDST is too big, heavy, and power-hungry. For these missions, the Iris transponder could be considered instead.

== See also ==
- Electra (radio) - A UHF transponder for satellite to surface communication
- Frontier Radio - a small spacecraft transponder designed by Johns Hopkins and produced by Rocket Lab.
- Iris (transponder) - a smaller transponder developed by JPL for use in cubesats
