= Iris (transponder) =

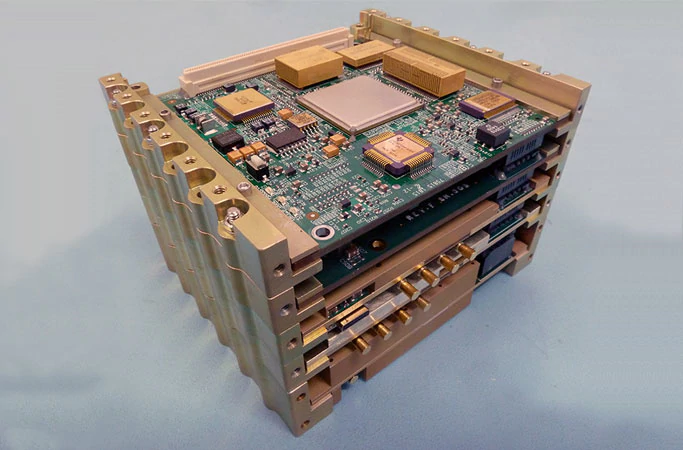
The Iris transponder for deep space communication

The Iris transponder is a small, low power deep-space transponder designed by JPL for use in cubesats. It unifies a number of communication functions - receiver, command detector, telemetry modulator, exciters, and control functions - into one 1.2-kg package that occupies about 0.5 U. Iris is designed to handle X band uplink, UHF receive, and both X band and optional Ka band downlink. It is only one third the mass, and lower power, compared to the smallest previous solution, the Small Deep Space Transponder.

== Functions ==
The capabilities of Iris include:

- X-band receiver/downconverter capable of carrier tracking.
- Command detector unit function.
- Telemetry modulation function.
- X-band exciter.
- A matching X-band power amplifier and low-noise amplifier.
- X-band ranging.
- UHF (390-450 MHz) receiver for communication with landers/rovers.
- Differential one-way ranging (DOR) at X-band.
- Uplink: TC Space Data Link Protocol - CCSDS 232.0-B-3
- Downlink: AOS Space Data Link Protocol = CCSDS 732.0-B-3
- Supports codes Convolutional 7-1/2, Manchester, Bi-Phase, and bypass (NRZ), Reed Solomon (255,223), Turbo codes with rates 1/2, 1/3, and 1/6 (block size 8920 bits)
- Interface to rest of CubeSat electronics is through Serial Peripheral Interface Bus, with a special hardwired output to reset the CubeSat.

== Missions ==
- Mars Cube One
- Lunar Flashlight
- BioSentinel
- NEA Scout

== See also ==
- Electra (radio)
