= Starbase, Texas =

City in Texas, United States

Starbase
- City
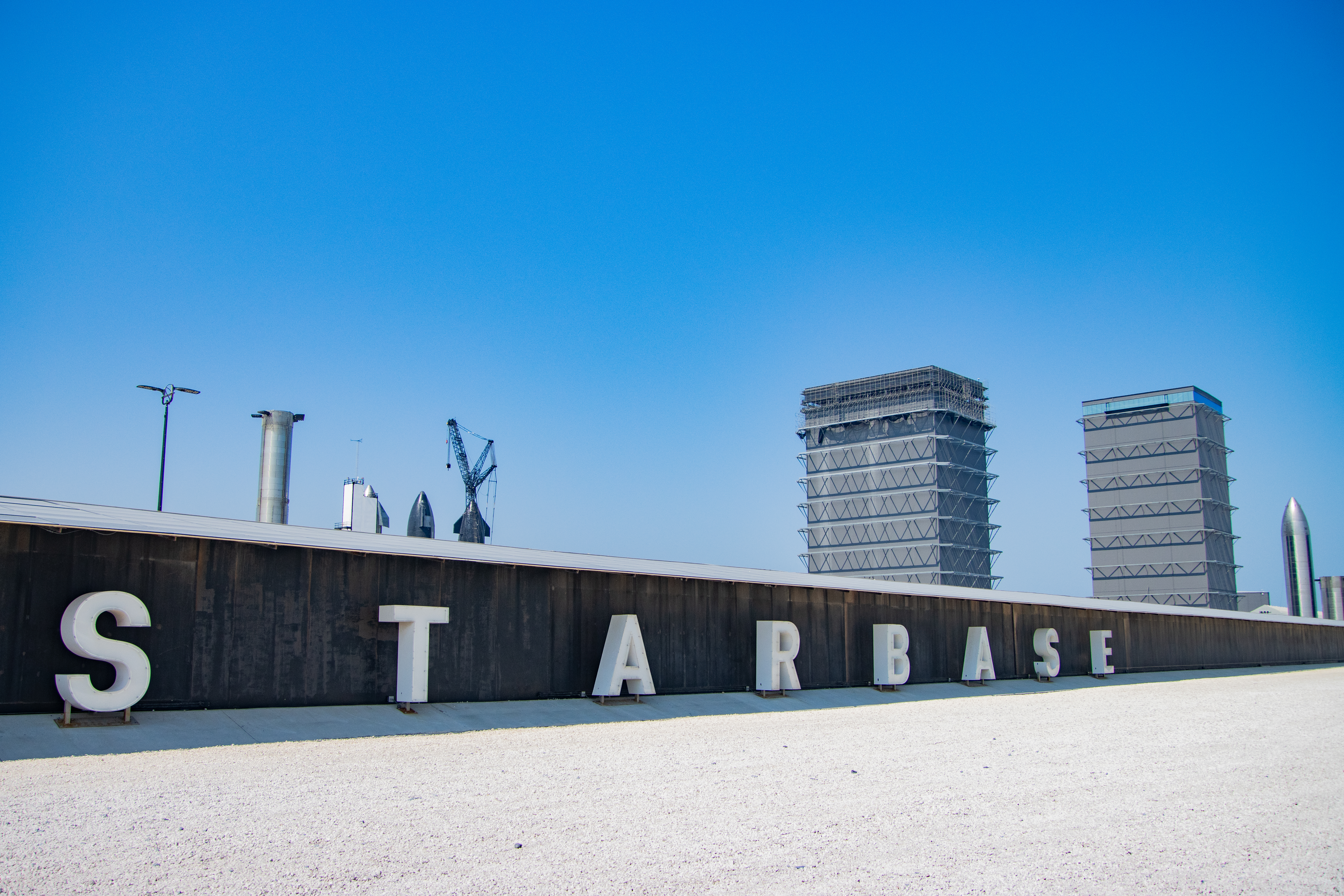
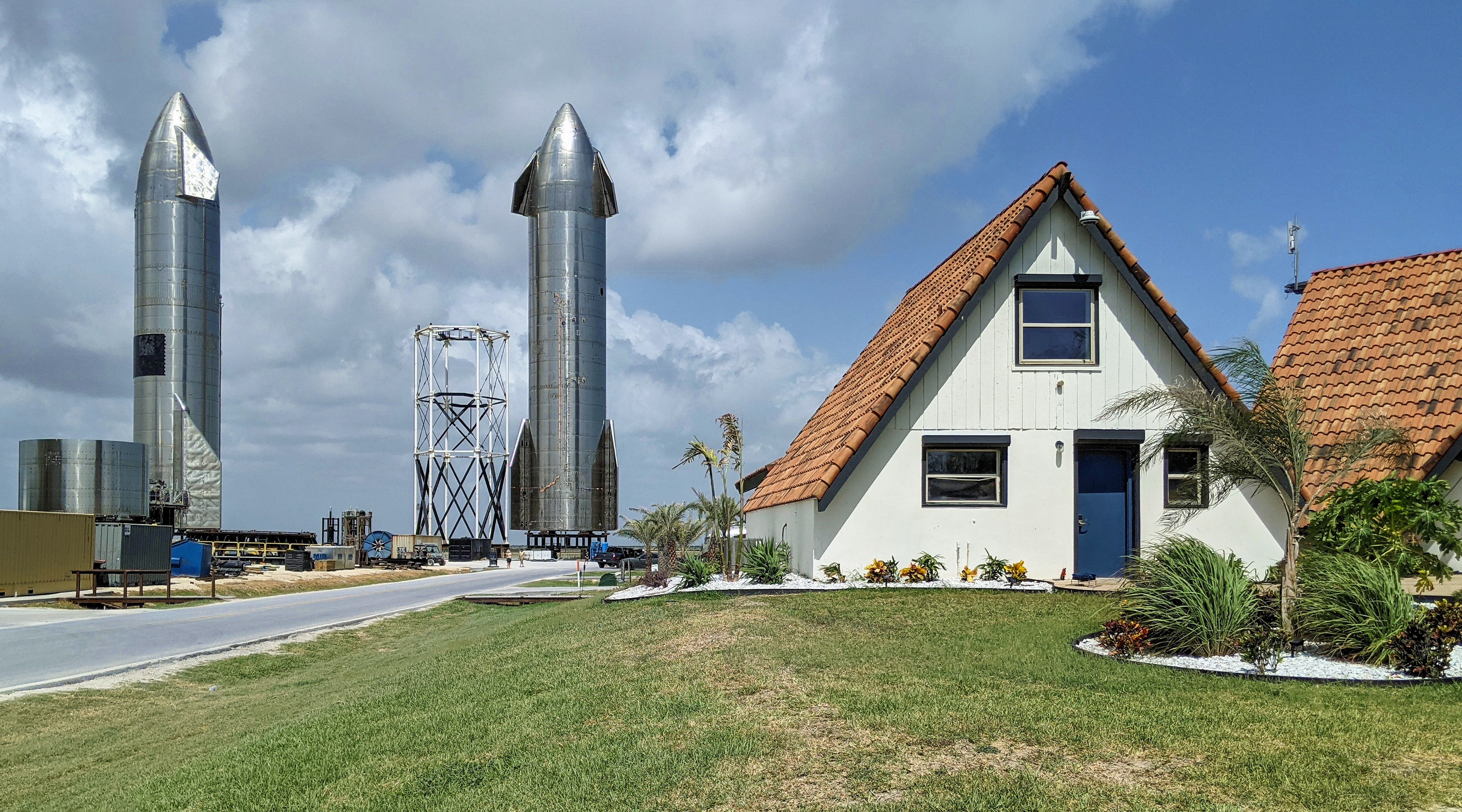
- From top to bottom: The Starbase sign at the entrance of the facility; The "Tiki-bar" alongside Starship prototypes SN15 and SN16.

- Seal Wordmark
- Coordinates: 25°59′29″N 97°11′1″W
- Country: United States
- State: Texas
- County: Cameron
- Kennedy Shores (unincorporated): 1967
- Kopernik Shores (unincorporated): 1975
- Starbase (incorporation): May 20, 2025

Government
  - Type: Commission
  - Mayor: Bobby Peden
  - City Commission: Commission members: Jordan Buss; Taylor Wallace
  - City Administrator: Kent Myers
- Elevation: 3 ft (0.91 m)

Population (2025)
  - Total: 500
- Time zone: UTC-6 (CST)
  - Summer (DST): UTC-5 (CDT)
- Website: starbase.texas.gov

Starbase, formerly Boca Chica Village or Kopernik Shores, is a Village in Cameron County, Texas, United States, near the mouth of the Rio Grande and immediately adjacent to the Mexico–United States border. It lies 20 miles (32 km) east of the City of Brownsville on the Boca Chica peninsula, and forms part of the Brownsville–Harlingen–Raymondville and the Matamoros–Brownsville metropolitan areas. It is situated on State Highway 4 (Boca Chica Boulevard), immediately south of the South Bay lagoon, and is located about 2 mi (3.2 km) north of the mouth of the Rio Grande. The population was 500 as of 2025.

The town was initially formed in the late 1960s, and has changed greatly since 2018 as SpaceX came to purchase many of the village properties. Numerous construction projects are underway including a community center, school, clinic, and additional housing. In 2014, the village was chosen as the location for the construction of a control facility for the SpaceX South Texas launch site, while the launch site itself was slated to be built just 2 miles (3.2 km) farther east, adjacent to Boca Chica State Park on the Texas Gulf Coast. Flight testing—and even more frequent ground testing—of prototype rocket vehicles and rocket engines began in 2019 and have continued into 2026.

When SpaceX's Starbase launch and testing facilities were established it made the city experience more rapid economic and industrial development. It was able to bring the city investments, more tourism, and more employment opportunities for residents, but it has also created debate about environmental conservation, land use, worries from homeowners, and the effect of commercial spaceflight on the communities that are around it.

In March 2021, SpaceX CEO Elon Musk announced plans to incorporate a new city to be called Starbase in the area. The city was planned to include the existing Boca Chica Village, the SpaceX test site and launch site, and more of the surrounding Boca Chica area. SpaceX submitted a petition in 2024 to Cameron County to formally incorporate the city of Starbase, which voters approved on May 3, 2025, through a municipal ballot measure. Formal incorporation occurred on May 20, 2025.

== History ==
=== Early history ===
In 1967, the settlement was founded as Kennedy Shores by John Caputa, a Chicagoan property developer, and was initially aimed at working-class Polish migrants.

After building a community of about 30 ranch-style houses, the settlement was devastated by Hurricane Beulah later in 1967, which destroyed its restaurant and public utility systems. Electricity was restored, but many of the homes did not have potable water even decades later.

In 1975, local resident Stanley Piotrowicz was voted in as town "mayor"; he renamed the village Kopernik Shores after Nicolaus Copernicus, and attempted to have the village recognized as an incorporated community, but this was denied by the state government. In 1990 and 2000, the population was 26 people.

In 2008, only six people were permanent residents of the village, which was dubbed a "ghost town".

=== SpaceX launch site ===
In 2012, private space exploration company SpaceX named the Boca Chica area as a possible location for the construction of their future private commercial launch site. SpaceX started buying land in Boca Chica in 2012. In August 2014, SpaceX announced that they had selected the Boca Chica area as the location for their South Texas Launch Site, and that their "control center" would be within the village itself, while the launch complex would be located two miles (3.2 km) to the east. Limited construction began that year, and more extensive construction activities began around 2018.

Flight testing of the SpaceX Starship with a newly designed Raptor rocket engine began in 2019 and has continued into 2021. With the village only a few miles from the test site Cameron County officials—following launch test permitting requirements set by the US regulatory authority, the FAA—began in August 2019 to request residents to stand outside their homes during any tests that involve loading of propellant fuel, due to perceived danger from shock-wave induced broken windows in the event of a test anomaly and explosion.

The site has been criticized as a "sacrifice zone". It was seen as empty space by both SpaceX and the state; in 2018, for example, Musk said: "We’ve got a load of land with nobody around, so if it blows up, it's cool." At the time of its construction, many of the villagers’ homes were bought out with the threat of eminent domain. The launch site is an area where ‘negative externalities’ are located making it a sacrifice zone.

In September 2019, SpaceX extended an offer to buy each of the houses in Boca Chica Village for three times the fair market value along with an offer of VIP invitations to future launch events. The amount of the offer was said to be "non-negotiable". Homeowners were initially given two weeks for that particular offer to remain valid.

Some Boca Chica property owners were happy with the offer and made plans to accept, but other owners were not, noting that they had made substantial improvements to their properties and that the base valuation used by the September process used county tax assessment valuations and did not look at the specifics of each house so could not be a full appraised valuation. The Houston Chronicle reported that the county seems to be taking a broader view of what is best for the "local economy, educational system, and quality of living in a region that is one of the poorest in the state." Cameron County Judge Eddie Treviño, Jr. specifically mentioned consideration of the "450,000, 500,000 people that make up Cameron County, and the other million that make up the Valley, and also all the residents of Texas ... [though] it is terrible, personally, for those 10 or 20 remaining residential owners" in Boca Chica Village.

The New York Times reported in late September that SpaceX extended the original two-week offer period by three weeks, in order to allow property owners to work with the county appraiser in order to potentially get their assessed valuations adjusted upward based on improvements beyond what the previous appraisal understood.

Many residents who accepted purchase offers had moved away by March 2020.

A small number of house owners in Boca Chica Village did not accept the 2019 offer from SpaceX and remained in the village in October 2020, one year after the initial purchase offers from SpaceX were made to residents.

"David Finlay, SpaceX’s Senior Director of Finance, told Boca Chica Village residents that this would be SpaceX’s final and best offer, and threatened the company would need to pursue alternate means to obtain the homes if the people of Boca Chica Village turned down the money. ... 'the scale and frequency of spaceflight activities at the site continue to accelerate, your property will frequently fall within established hazard zones in which no civilians will be permitted to remain, in order to comply with all federal and other public safety regulations. This email therefore represents SpaceX’s best and final purchase offer.'"

The SpaceX Launch site currently operates under licensing and environmental oversight by the Federal Aviation Administration (FAA). In 2025, the FAA completed a Final Tiered Environmental Assessment and Mitigated Finding of No Significant Impact/Record of Decision that allows more launch cadence, including up to 25 Starship/Super Heavy orbital launches annually, but is subject to mitigation measures and still has regulatory oversight.

=== Community impacts ===
The growth that Starbase has experienced has created major economic development, social development and debate, and environmental worries regarding repercussions on the city and surrounding area. Researchers have found that spaceport development does make the cities in which it happens have more opportunities for residents to become employed, helps increase money intake from tourism, and increases infrastructure investment, but it is also found that it causes many challenges with housing, land use, and the feeling of community identity.

The local officials of Starbase have said that it is an important economic driver for Cameron County helping it come up from being thought to be one of the poorest regions in the U.S. According to the Greater Brownsville Economic Development Corporation, Starbase has been able to make 5,000 jobs and made around $100 million in tourism in the previous year alone. Local businesses, like charter fishing operators also confirm this reporting that there has been more tourism as a result of all the Starship launches.

However, some residents have also claimed negative effects from these Starship launches. Many people have pursued lawsuits against SpaceX over alleged damages. Many of these people say that the rocket launches have cause major damage to their homes with the cause being vibration and shockwaves of launches, and there are also many residents that are found to be concerned with the effects of industrialization, property ownership, and how it is changing the community around them.

Academic research has found Starbase to be somewhat of a cultural phenomenon. reshaping public interaction with commercial spaceflight and how photographers, influencers, and groups with an interest in SpaceX's activities have made communities around Boca Chica because of Starship's development and this has made a global audience that follows the actions of SpaceX. Researchers say that these communities have played a hand in reshaping public interaction with commercial spaceflight and add to new cultural understandings of space exploration.

Environmental impacts have also added to the debate about the presence of SpaceX. Conservation organizations challenge land exchanges that involve the Lower Rio Grande Valley National Wildlife Refuge, saying that if they expand more it would affect the habitats of the wildlife, protected lands, and places that are valued historically such as sites where Civil War battles occurred. There have also been environmental groups that are worried about rocket debris, breaking up habitats, and the possible development around Starbase. Although SpaceX has said that they comply with environmental regulations and are committed to safety and mitigations of possible negative impacts when conducting their business.

=== 2025 incorporation ===
In March 2021, Elon Musk stated that he was seeking to incorporate Boca Chica Village as the city Starbase. Eddie Treviño, Jr., the County Judge of Cameron County, indicated then that the county's commissioners court "were informed of SpaceX's endeavor", and said that SpaceX "must abide by all state incorporation statutes".

Starbase includes Boca Chica Village—where both the legacy house community and the SpaceX build site are located—as well as the SpaceX test site and launch site, since Starbase was to be a municipality "much larger than Boca Chica".

In May 2024, Cameron County submitted a formal proposal to the U.S. Board on Geographic Names, to rename the village from Kopernik Shores (still its official name for federal purposes, despite having fallen out of common use) to Starbase, which was publicly posted on their website in July 2024. At the May 2024 meeting of the Board's Domestic Names Committee, doubts were expressed over whether the proposed name violates the Board's policy against recognizing names intended to promote a commercial enterprise. In October 2024, the Board was awaiting feedback on the proposal from the U.S. Fish and Wildlife Service and the Texas Geographic Names Committee.

On May 20, 2025, Starbase was formally incorporated as a Type C general city with a commission form of government, comprising a mayor and two commissioners. with Bobby Peden, a SpaceX vice-president, serving as mayor. Peden ran unopposed, as did two other residents with SpaceX ties who fill the two commissioner seats.

=== Post-incorporation ===
On February 3, 2026, the City Commission approved an ordinance formally establishing the Starbase Police Department. This created the legal framework, including the position of Chief of Police (appointed by the Commission), requirements for officers to be TCOLE-licensed, and outlined duties/authority. Initial setup targets about eight officers plus one administrative employee, led by a Public Safety Director/Chief of Police. The city is conducting a nationwide search for the chief.

The city is planning to annex 7,133 acres of unpopulated land in its east in 2026, which would increase the size of the city to around 8,000 acres. While the federal Boca Chica Wildlife Refuge and state agencies manage a significant portion of the land, SpaceX and other private owners hold large tracts within the area targeted for annexation.

== See also ==
- Boca Chica (Texas)
- Battle of Palmito Ranch
- Del Valle, Texas
- Leesville, Texas
- Interstate 69 in Texas
- Snailbrook, Texas
- List of municipalities in Texas
