= Electra (radio) =

Spacecraft and rover telecommunications package

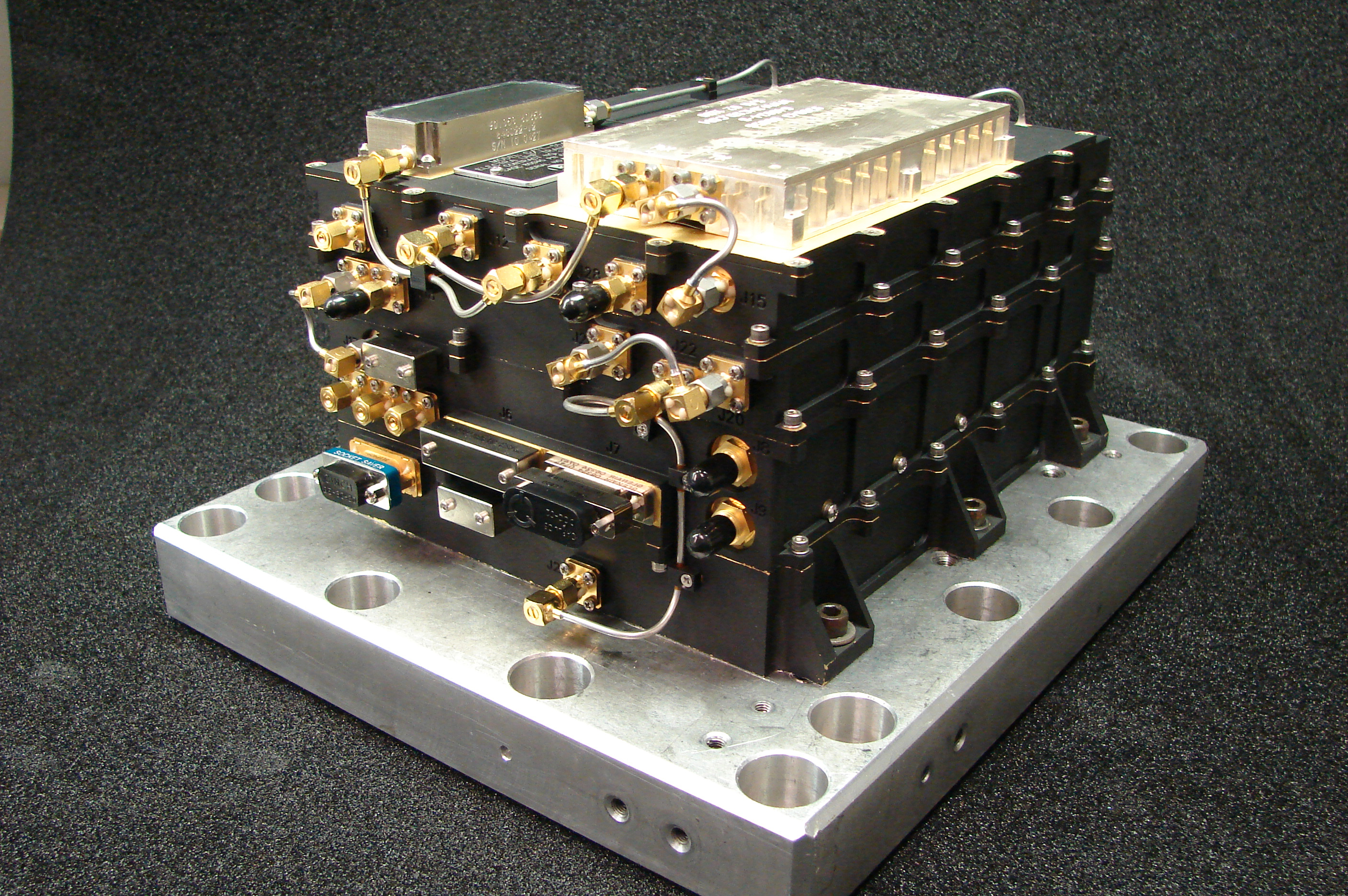
Electra transceiver installed on the MAVEN orbiter, which was launched in November 2013

Electra, formally called the Electra Proximity Link Payload, is a telecommunications package that acts as a communications relay and navigation aid for Mars spacecraft and rovers. The use of such a relay increases the amount of data that can be returned by two to three orders of magnitude.

The ultimate goal of Electra is to achieve a higher level of system integration, thus allowing significant mass, power, and size reductions, at lower cost, for a broad class of spacecraft.

== Overview ==
The Mars Global Surveyor, Mars Odyssey and Mars Express orbiters carry the first generation of UHF relay payloads. Building on this initial experience, NASA developed a next-generation relay payload, the Electra Proximity Link Payload, which flew for the first time on the 2005 Mars Reconnaissance Orbiter.

Using Mars orbiters as radio relays to increase data return from rovers and other landers reduces the mass and power the surface spacecraft need for communications. A special feature is that it can actively adjust the data rate during a communication session – slower when the orbiter is near the horizon from the surface robot's perspective, faster when it is overhead. To build the relay network cost-effectively, NASA includes a relay communications payload on each of its science orbiters. Mars missions launched after 2005 make use of Electra UHF transceiver to provide for any navigation, command, and data-return needs these missions may have. The arriving spacecraft can receive these signals and determine its distance and speed in relation to Mars. This communication allows much more precise navigation.

When NASA's landers and rovers land safely on Mars, Electra can provide precise Doppler data which, when combined with Mars Reconnaissance Orbiter's position information, can accurately determine the location of the lander or rover on the surface of Mars. Electra can also provide UHF coverage to Mars landers and rovers on the surface using its nadir-pointed (pointed straight down at the surface) antenna. This coverage would be important to landed crafts on Mars that might not have sufficient radio power to communicate directly with Earth by themselves.

== Key features ==
- Transceiver that runs the free open source RTEMS operating system.
- Electra's software-defined radio (SDR) provides flexible platform for evolving relay capabilities.
- Fully reprogrammable software/firmware functionality by using field-programmable gate array (FPGA) technology.
- CCSDS Proximity-1 Space Link Protocol for interoperable, reliable data transfer.
- Frequency-agile operation across UHF band (390–450 MHz).
- Integrated Doppler navigation and timing services.
- Data rates up to 1 Mbit/s

== Deployments ==
- Mars Reconnaissance Orbiter (2nd generation UHF, the Electra Proximity Link Payload)
- Mars Science Laboratory Curiosity rover which uses the Electra-lite
- MAVEN orbiter
- ExoMars Trace Gas Orbiter by ESA, two Electra radios
- InSight lander
- Perseverance rover by NASA

== Predecessor ==
- Mars Global Surveyor (1st generation UHF relay payload)
- 2001 Mars Odyssey (1st generation UHF relay payload)
- Mars Express (1st generation UHF relay payload)

== See also ==
- Small Deep Space Transponder
