= Archimedes (rocket engine) =

Liquid fuel rocket engine

- Country of origin: United States; New Zealand
- Designer: Rocket Lab
- Manufacturer: Rocket Lab
- Application: First- and second-stage engine
- Status: In development

Liquid-fuel engine
- Propellant: LOX / CH_{4}
- Cycle: Oxidizer-rich staged combustion

Configuration
- Chamber: 1

Performance
- Thrust, vacuum: 890 kN (200,000 lbf)
- Thrust, sea-level: 730 kN (165,000 lbf)
- Throttle range: 50–100%
- Chamber pressure: 100 bar
- Specific impulse, vacuum: 365 s (3.58 km/s)
- Specific impulse, sea-level: 329 s (3.23 km/s)

Used in
- Neutron

Archimedes is a liquid-fuel rocket engine burning liquid oxygen and liquid methane in an oxidizer-rich staged combustion cycle. It is designed by aerospace company Rocket Lab for its Neutron rocket.

== History ==
Archimedes was presented on December 2, 2021, in a webcast by Rocket Lab CEO Peter Beck as a fully reusable, gas generator engine using liquid oxygen (LOX) and methane as propellant, a departure from the company's previous Rutherford, which is electrically pump fed. He then stated that it had a thrust of 1 MN (220,000 lbf) and 320 seconds of specific impulse. The same day, the Neutron page on Rocket Lab's website was updated specifying the thrust of the seven Archimedes engines used on the first stage as 5,960 kN (1,340,000 lbf) at sea level and a maximum thrust of 7,530 kN (1,690,000 lbf) and the upper stage's single vacuum optimized Archimedes at 1,110 kN (250,000 lbf). It was expected to have its first hot-fire test during May 2024. In an interview published on the CNBC website, Beck stated that Archimedes would be manufactured in New Zealand and its very simple design had "all the things you want when you have to build an engine that can be reused over and over again."

In the September 21st, 2022 Investor Day Presentation, the engine design had changed to an oxidizer-rich staged combustion cycle. The presentation stated that the sea level version would have a maximum thrust of 730 kN (160,000 lbf) with a specific impulse of 329 seconds and would be able to throttle to 50% of maximum thrust.

Meanwhile, the vacuum optimized version would have a maximum thrust of 890 kN (200,000 lbf), a specific impulse of 367 s and the same throttling capabilities of 50% of maximum thrust. It was also implied, but not confirmed, that the engine would be built in the Virginia, USA factory. It was disclosed they would use the Stennis Space Center A-3 Test stand for development testing. They expected to start preburner testing in that or the following quarter, hopefully starting full engine testing at Stennis before the end of 2023, and hoped to be able to launch by mid 2025.

A video of a full-mission duration hot fire was published by Rocket Lab in August 2025.

== Design ==
Archimedes is presented as a highly reusable liquid-propellant engine using methane and liquid oxygen in an oxidizer-rich staged combustion cycle. There are both sea-level and vacuum variants. The engine is mostly 3D printed, with some of the biggest 3D printers in the world. The rationale for the cycle change from the original gas generator was that they could not get the performance they needed through all the throttle points that a reusable rocket needs, without pushing the turbine temperature and other factors beyond their preset limits. By changing to the higher performing cycle but with lower performance requirements, they were able to lower temperatures and other stress factors and increase margins everywhere, making reusability more attainable.

== See also ==
- Rocket Lab Neutron
- Rutherford (rocket engine)
- Curie (rocket engine)
- Merlin (rocket engine family)
- SpaceX Raptor
