= Rocket Lab =

American public spaceflight company

Rocket Lab Corporation
- Type: Public
- Traded as: Nasdaq: RKLB; Nasdaq-100 component
- Industry: Launch service provider Aerospace manufacturer
- Founded: June 2006; 20 years ago in Auckland, New Zealand
- Founder: Peter Beck
- Headquarters: Long Beach, California, U.S.
- Key people: Peter Beck (CEO and CTO); Adam Spice (CFO); Frank Klein (COO)
- Products: Electron rocket Rutherford rocket engine Archimedes rocket engine Curie and HyperCurie rocket engine Photon satellite bus family Neutron rocket
- Revenue: ▲US$602 million (2025)
- Operating income: ▼US$−229 million (2025)
- Net income: ▼US$−198 million (2025)
- Total assets: ▲US$2,324 million (December 2025)
- Total equity: ▲US$1,722 million (2025)
- Number of employees: 2,600 (May 2025)
- Website: rocketlabcorp.com

Rocket Lab Corporation (formerly Rocket Lab Limited, then Rocket Lab USA, Inc.) is a publicly traded aerospace manufacturer and launch service provider. Its Electron orbital rocket launches small satellites and has successfully completed over 75 missions as of January 2026, making it the most prolific small-lift launch vehicle in operation globally. A suborbital variant of Electron, called HASTE (Hypersonic Accelerator Suborbital Test Electron), was developed as a testbed to advance hypersonic technology development, while the next-generation reusable Neutron medium-lift launch vehicle is in development to support constellation deployment, interplanetary missions, and human spaceflight. The company is a supplier of satellite components such as star trackers, reaction wheels, solar panels, electric propulsion systems, software-defined radios, composite structures, separation systems, and electro-optical and infrared (EO/IR) sensors, as well as flight and ground software. The company also manufactures satellite buses and complete spacecraft as part of its strategic vision to become a vertically integrated, end-to-end space company.

Rocket Lab was founded by Peter Beck in 2006 in New Zealand. In 2009, it became the first private company in the Southern Hemisphere to reach space with the successful launch of its Ātea-1 sounding rocket. In 2013 it set up headquarters in Huntington Beach, California, before later moving to Long Beach in 2020. After establishing its U.S. presence, the company raised venture capital for the development of its Electron orbital rocket, which reached space on its maiden flight in 2017, and orbit on its second flight in 2018. In 2020, the company launched its first self-built and designed satellite, First Light, which is derived from Electron's kick stage.

The company is a major spacecraft manufacturer, building and operating satellites for commercial constellation operators such as Globalstar, as well as government customers like the Space Development Agency.

Since 2020, Rocket Lab acquired seven companies, including Sinclair Interplanetary in April 2020, Advanced Solutions, Inc. (ASI) in October 2021, Planetary Systems Corporation (PSC) in December 2021, SolAero Holdings, Inc. in January 2022, Geost, LLC in August 2025, Mynaric AG in April 2026, and Motiv Space Systems in May 2026.

In August 2021, the company went public on the Nasdaq stock exchange through a special-purpose acquisition company (SPAC) merger. As of May 2025, the company had over 2,600 employees globally, with more than 700 based in New Zealand.

== History ==
=== Origin (2006–2012) ===
Rocket Lab was founded in June 2006 by Peter Beck in New Zealand, after a trip to the United States. During the trip, Beck realized the possibility and potential for a low-cost, small rocket. While contacting potential investors, he met Mark Rocket, who later became a seed investor and was co-director from 2007 to 2011. Other investors to the company included Stephen Tindall, Vinod Khosla, and the New Zealand Government.

The company became the first private company in the Southern Hemisphere to reach space after launching its Ātea-1 sounding rocket in November 2009. The payload was not recovered, and the launch was deemed unsuccessful. The payload was a ballistic instrumentation dart and its trajectory depended only on the boost phase. The launch took place off the coast of New Zealand, from the private island (Great Mercury Island) of Michael Fay, a New Zealand banker and Rocket Lab investor.

In December 2010, the company was awarded a U.S. government contract from the Operationally Responsive Space Office (ORS) to study a low-cost space launcher to place CubeSats into orbit. The agreement with NASA enabled the company to contract for limited NASA resources, including personnel, facilities, and equipment, for commercial launch efforts.

=== United States move (2013–2020) ===
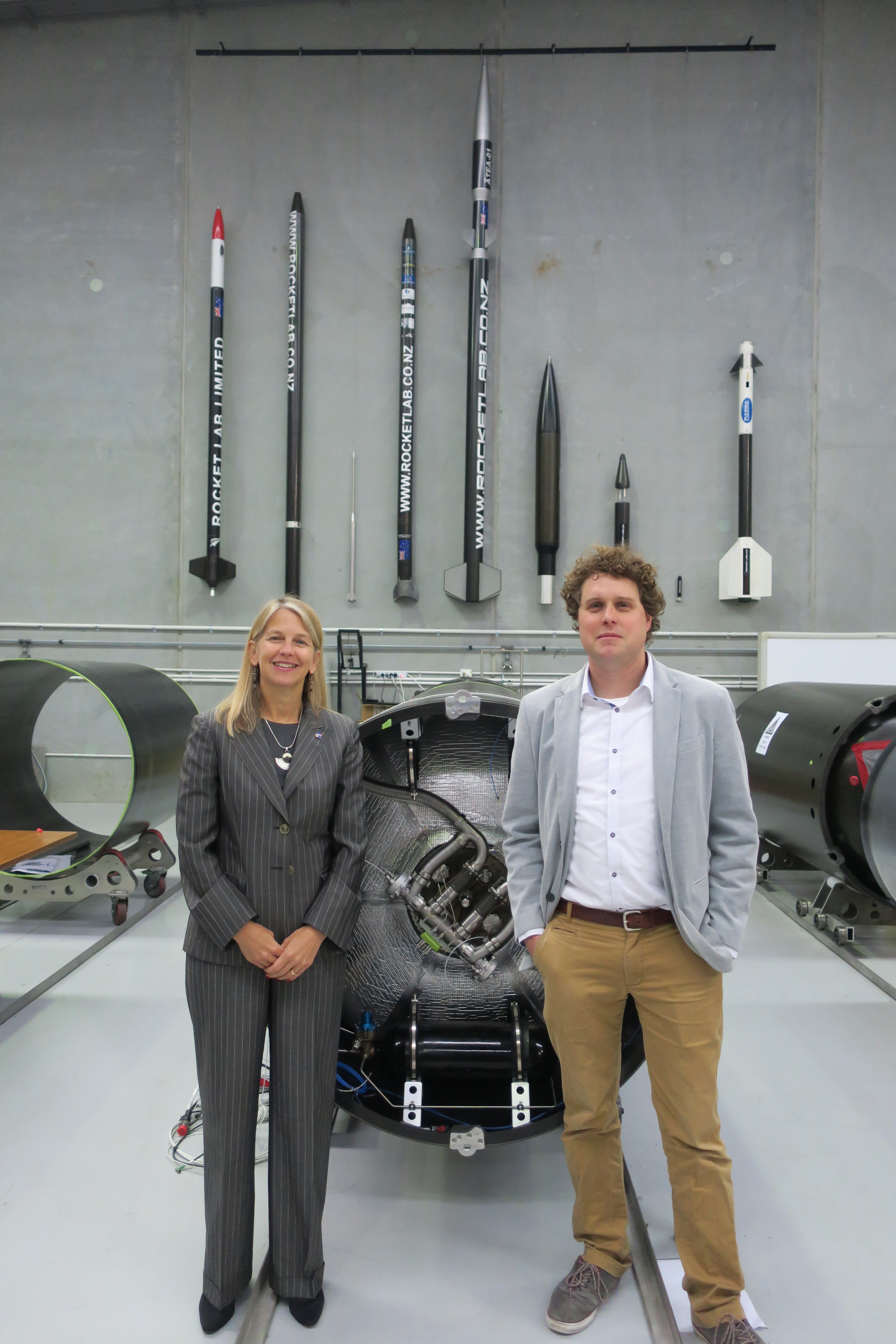
Peter Beck and Dava Newman posing in front of Rocket Lab's sounding rockets, 2016

In 2013, the company moved to the United States and established its headquarters in Huntington Beach, California. The move coincided with funding from American sources, and was in part due to increased U.S. government involvement. The New Zealand company then became a subsidiary of its newly formed U.S. parent company, Rocket Lab USA, Inc. In 2020, Rocket Lab moved to Long Beach. The move was motivated by the need to accommodate the company's growing workforce and to be closer to suppliers and customers. The new facility includes a state-of-the-art production facility for manufacturing the company's Electron launch vehicle, as well as administrative offices and other support facilities.

In 2013, funding was obtained from Khosla Ventures, and Callaghan Innovation (a Crown entity of New Zealand). Bessemer Venture Partners invested in 2014 and Lockheed Martin invested in 2015. Rocket Lab announced in March 2017 that it had raised an additional US$75 million in a Series D equity round led by Data Collective with participation by Promus Ventures and earlier investors. In May 2017, Callaghan Innovation funding was reported to total NZ$15 million. In November 2018, the company reported raising a $150 million Series E round led by Future Fund. The first NASA mission, launched in 2018, was valued by the space agency at $6.9 million (with launch services, etc., included).

In 2018, Rocket Lab began to develop reusable first stage technology, after previously stating publicly that they had no intention of attempting to recover and reuse their launch vehicles. They disclosed the effort to study the potential recovery of an Electron first stage in August 2019, aiming to use a parachute and mid-air retrieval. In December 2019, they flight tested the reentry technology, a Rocket Lab proprietary aerothermal decelerator, on Electron flight number 10, and were able to decelerate the rocket and successfully bring it through the space to lower atmosphere transition.

In March 2020, the company announced that it had acquired Sinclair Interplanetary, a Canadian manufacturer of components for small satellites. Rocket Lab said that it would use Sinclair technology on its Photon line of small satellite buses, and that it would help Sinclair increase production of small satellite components for sale to other firms. Thereafter, Rocket Lab launched missions with some or all of the payload being made by Sinclair Interplanetary.

=== Public company (2021–present) ===
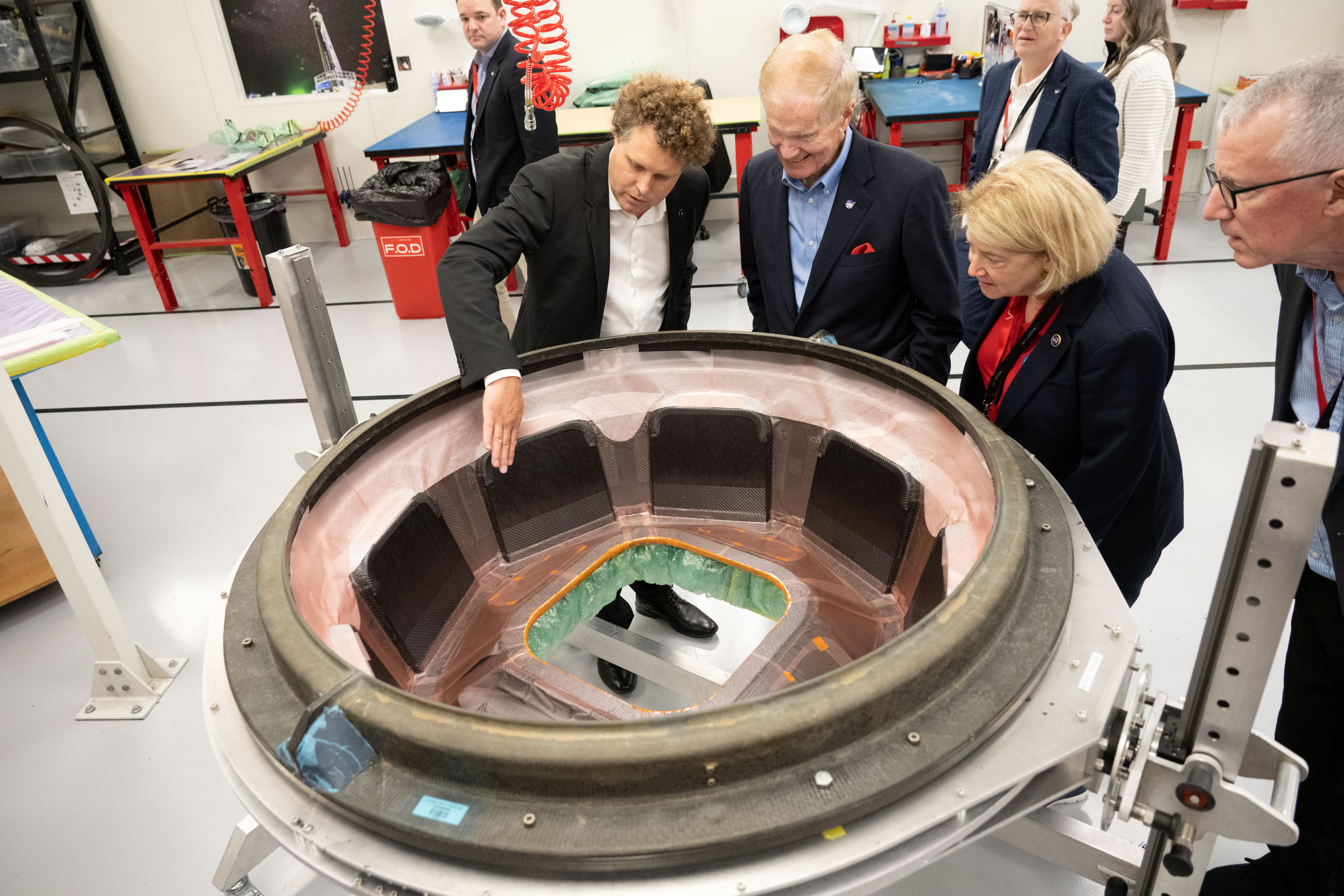
Founder Peter Beck with NASA Administrator Bill Nelson and Deputy Administrator Pamela Melroy at the Rocket Lab facility in Auckland, 2023

In March 2021, the company announced that it was planning to go public through an initial public offering (IPO) of stock in the second quarter of 2021. The company planned to accomplish the IPO through a merger with a special-purpose acquisition company (SPAC) called Vector Acquisition Corporation (VACQ). The merger planned to value the company at US$4.1 billion and provide the company with $790 million in working capital to support the development of a medium-lift two-stage-to-orbit launch vehicle called Neutron, aiming for the mega-constellation satellite deployment market. Neutron was planned to be partially reusable with the booster stage performing a Return To Launch Site (RTLS) landing, to be refurbished and relaunched.

The company began trading on the Nasdaq stock exchange on 25 August 2021 after merging with SPAC Vector Acquisition at a $4.8 billion valuation. The transaction added $777 million in gross cash. At the time, Rocket Lab had over 500 employees, and it had successfully launched 105 satellites into orbit. Rocket Lab's launch business booked revenues of $13.5 million in 2018, $48 million in 2019, and an estimated $33 million in 2020. Rocket Lab spent between $250 and $300 million of the cash gained from becoming a public company to develop Neutron, which it aimed to launch by 2025. Following the IPO, the company name changed to Rocket Lab Corporation.

As of August 2021, the company intended to build a new factory in the United States to manufacture the rockets as well as launch infrastructure for Neutron at the Mid-Atlantic Regional Spaceport in Wallops Island, Virginia. In October 2021, the company acquired Advanced Solutions, Inc (ASI), a Colorado-based spacecraft flight software company. In November 2021, the company acquired Planetary Systems Corporation (PSC), a manufacturer of satellite separation systems, for $81.4 million. In January 2022, the company acquired SolAero, a supplier of space solar power products.

On 3 May 2022, in the "There And Back Again" mission, the company launched its Electron rocket from New Zealand and attempted to recover it for the first time. It was able to capture the falling rocket booster in mid-air, a historic first. Beck later said that the booster was hanging improperly, so it was allowed to parachute into the water where it was extracted by a ship.

In August 2022, the company revealed plans to become the first private company to reach Venus. The company is building a small probe, called the Venus Life Finder (VLF), which is designed to plunge through Venus's upper atmosphere for roughly five minutes between 29 mi (47 km) and 37 mi (60 km) above the planet's surface, searching for organic compounds. As of March 2025, the target launch date aboard the Electron rocket was Summer 2026, which was delayed, with no target date set in the final quarter of 2026.

In November 2022, Rocket Lab cut the ribbon on an engine test facility for the Archimedes engine at NASA's Stennis Space Center.

In October 2023, Rocket Lab officially opened its facility in Long Beach to support the development of the Archimedes engine. The facility, including production assets such as machinery and equipment, had been acquired in May 2023 from Virgin Orbit's bankruptcy proceedings.

In January 2024, Rocket Lab became the prime contractor for a $515 million United States Space Force (USSF) military satellite project, the company's largest contract to date.

In April 2024, the company announced it would begin selling carbon composite products to customers.

As of 2024, the company was developing the bigger Neutron reusable unibody rocket; multiple spacecraft buses, and rocket engines: Rutherford, Curie, HyperCurie, and Archimedes. In mid 2024, the company entered the engine test phase in Neutron's development process.

In October 2024, Green Party Foreign Affairs Spokesperson Teanau Tuiono asked Minister for Space Judith Collins if she was aware BlackSky Technology "has a contract to supply high temporal frequency images and analysis to the Israeli Defence ministry" and if this will prohibit future launches from New Zealand. Space activities in New Zealand are monitored by the Outer Space and High-altitude Activities Act 2017, Teanau Tuiono questioning whether launches would be denied on the basis of international relations. Previously Cabinet has not permitted some payloads.

In November 2024, news reports said the company threatened an academic in New Zealand with a defamation lawsuit for comments that Rocket Lab was involved with US military control over nuclear weapons.

In May 2025, Rocket Lab entered into an agreement to acquire GEOST. This has increased their total headcount by 115, bringing Rocket Lab's total headcount to more than 2,600 employees.

In October 2025, activist group Palestine Solidarity Network Aotearoa made a request to New Zealand Prime Minister Christopher Luxon to withdraw approval for upcoming launches for BlackSky Technology, as these launches have possible links to Israeli military intelligence.

In March 2026, Rocket Lab secured a US$190 million (NZ$327 million) contract with the United States Department of Defense (Department of War) to conduct a series of hypersonic test flights using its HASTE launch vehicle.

In April 2026, Rocket Lab completed the acquisition of Mynaric AG, a supplier of laser optical communications terminals, for an aggregate consideration value of $155.3 million. As Mynaric will continue to be based in Germany post-acquisition, this deal provided Rocket Lab with the company's first European footprint.

In April 2026, Rocket Lab announced the introduction of Gauss, an in-house designed and manufactured electric propulsion system for satellites. At the time of the announcement, Rocket Lab revealed it had already established a production line capable of manufacturing more than 200 Gauss thrusters per year.

In May 2026, Rocket Lab secured $90 million United States Space Force's Space Systems Command (SSC) contract to build and operate two geostationary satellites. The contract extends the work prototyping two Heimdall Space-based payloads, developed originally in a contract awarded to GEOST, integrated into Rocket Lab Optical Systems.

In May 2026, Rocket Lab completed the acquisition of Motiv Space Systems, a manufacturer of in space robotics, motion control systems, and precision mechanisms for spacecraft. The acquisition included Motiv's 50-person team and its manufacturing facilities in Pasadena, California. Following the deal, Motiv was rebranded as Rocket Lab Robotics.

In June 2026, Rocket Lab joined the Nasdaq-100, announced its pending acquisition of Iridium, and was awarded NASA contracts to launch three missions with its orbital-class Electron vehicles.

== Hardware ==
=== Electron orbital rocket ===
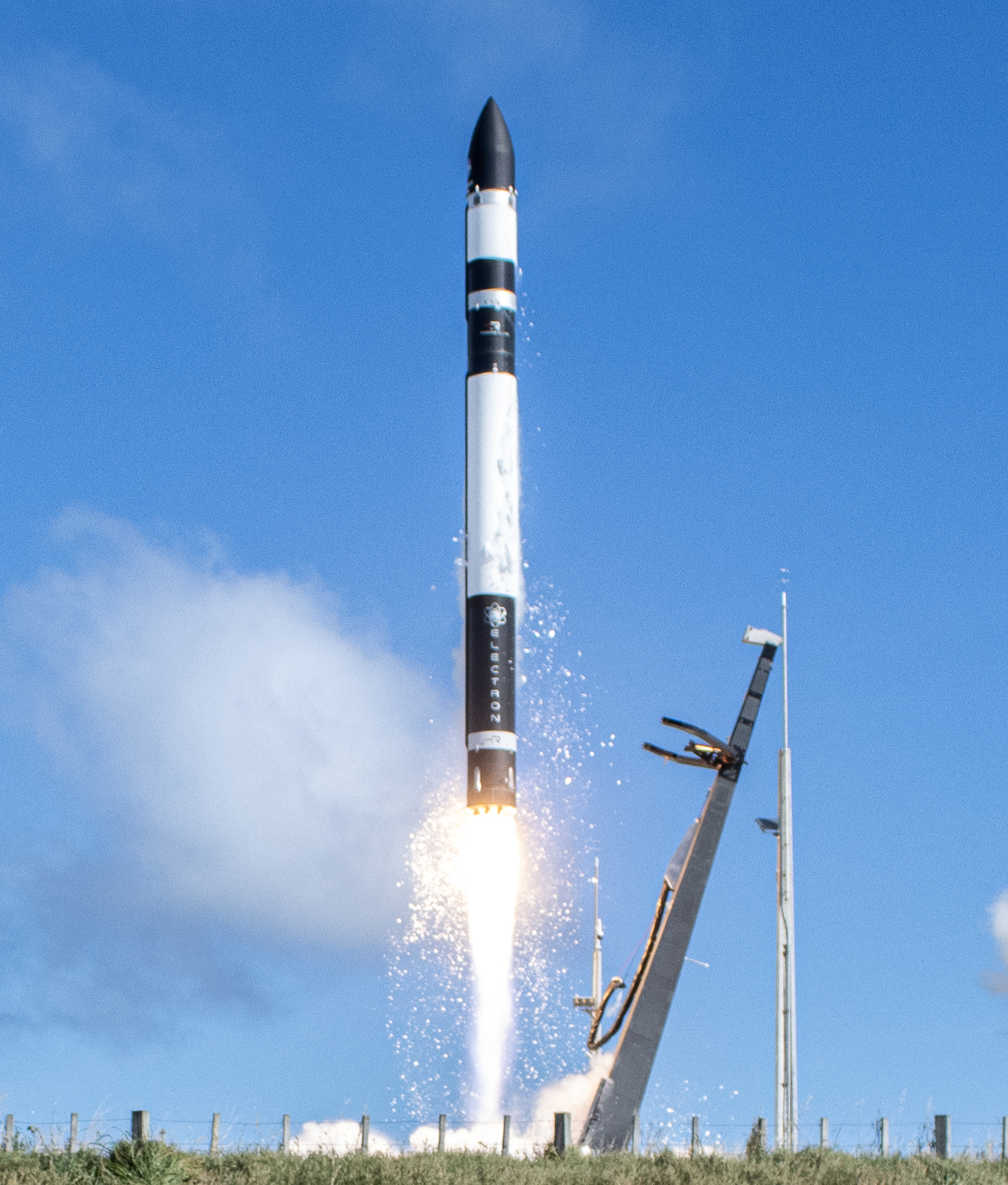
Electron launching from Launch Site 1

Electron is a two-stage launch vehicle that uses Rocket Lab's Rutherford liquid engines on both stages. The vehicle is capable of delivering payloads of 150 kg to a 500 km Sun-synchronous orbit. The projected cost is less than US$5 million per launch.

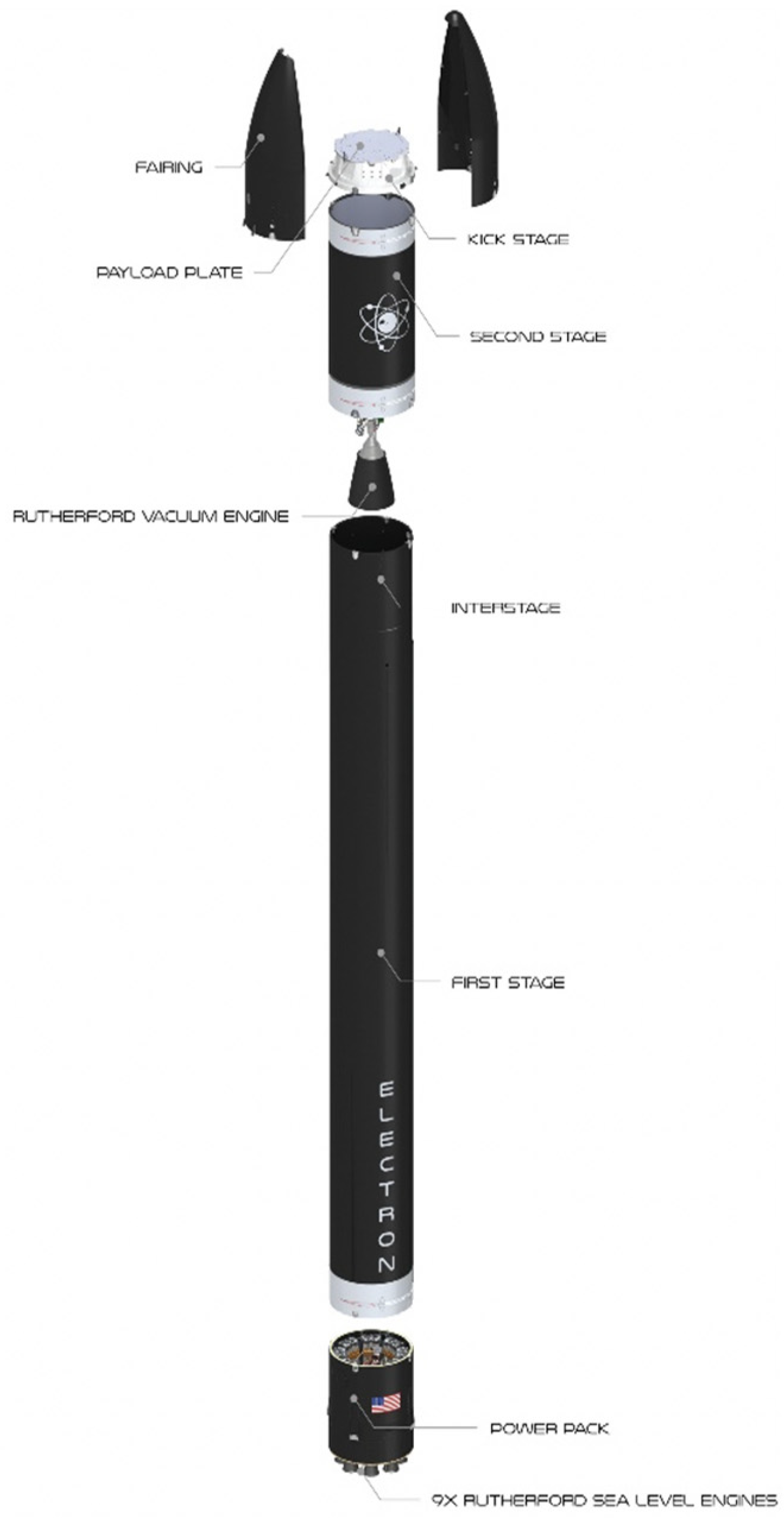
Rocket Lab's Electron Rocket

The Rutherford engine uses pumps driven by battery-powered electric motors rather than a gas generator, expander, or preburner. The engine is fabricated largely by 3D printing, using electron beam melting, whereby layers of metal powder are melted in a high vacuum by an electron beam. By March 2016, the 5,000 pounds-force (22 kN) second-stage Rutherford engine had completed firing tests. The first test flight took place on 25 May 2017 from Māhia Peninsula on New Zealand's North Island. After reaching an altitude of approximately 224 kilometres (139 mi), the rocket was performing nominally, but telemetry was lost, and flight control destroyed it.

On 21 January 2018, their second rocket, on a flight named "Still Testing", launched, reached orbit and deployed three CubeSats for customers Planet Labs and Spire Global. The rocket also carried a satellite payload called Humanity Star, a 1 m-wide (3.3 ft) carbon fiber geodesic sphere made of 65 panels that reflect the Sun's light. Humanity Star re-entered Earth's atmosphere and burned up in March 2018. On 11 November 2018, the first commercial launch (third launch overall) took off from Māhia Peninsula carrying satellites for Spire Global, GeoOptics, a CubeSat built by high school students, and a prototype of a dragsail.

On 4 July 2020, an issue during the second-stage burn of flight 13, named "Pics or It Didn't Happen", caused Electron to fail to get into orbit and its payloads were lost. On 19 November 2020, a launch mission named "Return to Sender" successfully deployed its payload of 30 small satellites. First stage recovery was also successfully implemented. On 15 May 2021, the company launched "Running Out Of Toes", which successfully utilized the first-stage recovery method like the one used on "Return to Sender". However, the rocket failed to place its payload of two BlackSky satellites into orbit after an issue occurred with the second stage.

On 15 September 2022, Rocket Lab launched "The Owl Spreads Its Wings" mission, sending a synthetic-aperture radar (SAR) satellite into Earth orbit. On September 19, 2023, the Electron failed its mission to deliver a Capella Space synthetic-aperture radar imaging satellite when the rocket's second stage failed shortly after separation. Electron successfully returned to flight on December 14 with the launch of a Japanese radar imaging satellite, which marked a record 10th flight for the rocket in 2023.

Two attempts have been made to recover an Electron booster by helicopter. In addition, six attempts have been made at soft water recovery.

=== HASTE suborbital rocket ===
Hypersonic Accelerator Suborbital Test Electron (HASTE) is a suborbital testbed launch vehicle derived from the Electron orbital rocket. HASTE provides flight test opportunities for hypersonic and suborbital system technology development. It successfully launched its first mission "Scout's Arrow" on 18 June 2023, for Leidos.

HASTE has a payload capacity of 700 kg (1,500 lb), double that of Electron. It can deploy payloads from 80 km (50 mi) altitude and higher. In 2024, two HASTE launches were planned. As of March 2026, Rocket Lab had secured contracts for at least twenty HASTE missions to be launched up to 2030.

=== Neutron reusable rocket ===
A design concept image of Neutron

The Archimedes Engine, which powers Neutron and began testing in 2024

The company announced in March 2021 that it was developing a new medium-lift two-stage human-rated launch vehicle called Neutron. Neutron is expected to be 40 m (130 ft) tall with a 4.5 m-diameter (15 ft) fairing. It will have 13-and-15-short-ton (12 and 14 t) capacities. Rocket Lab said they aim to make the first stage of the vehicle reusable, with landings planned on a floating landing platform downrange in the ocean. This method is similar to how SpaceX recovers the Falcon 9 and Falcon Heavy rockets. During a question and answer session with space and rocket communicator Scott Manley, Beck indicated a preference to avoid fixed assets such as landing barges. This indicated that design work had proceeded on the basis that the Neutron would return for landing rather than landing downrange.

Neutron launches are intended to take place from the Mid-Atlantic Regional Spaceport (MARS) on the eastern coast of Virginia. Rocket Lab is expected to modify the existing launch pad infrastructure at Launch Pad 0A (LP-0A). In March 2022, Rocket Lab announced that Neutron will be manufactured at a facility adjacent to MARS Launch Complex 2. Launch Complex 2 is currently being used for Electron launches. Rocket Lab began to break ground for this facility on 11 April 2022. As of March 2021, the company is planning for the first launch no earlier than mid-2025. In mid-2024, the company completed assembly on the first Archimedes engine, to undergo testing at Stennis Space Center, as well as some assembly on Neutron's fairings.

=== Ātea sounding rocket ===
The first and only launch of the Ātea (Māori for "space") sub-orbital sounding rocket occurred in late 2009. The 6 m-long (20 ft) rocket, weighing approximately 60 kg (130 lb), was designed to carry a 2 kg (4.4 lb) payload to an altitude of around 120 km (75 mi). It was intended to carry scientific payloads or possibly personal items.

Ātea-1, named Manu Karere or Bird Messenger by the local Māori iwi, was successfully launched from Great Mercury Island near the Coromandel Peninsula on 30 November 2009 at 01:23 UTC (14:23 local time). The rocket was tracked by a GPS uplink to the Inmarsat-B satellite constellation. After the flight, Ātea-1 splashed down approximately 50 kilometres (31 mi) downrange. The payload had no telemetry downlink, but carried instrumentation. The payload was not recovered as it was a dart of no value. The company advised that should it be encountered by vessels at sea, the payload should not be handled as it was "potentially hazardous" and contained delicate instruments. Performance characteristics were determined by the boost stage using downlink telemetry, and was recovered. This allowed Rocket Lab to move the entire team to the Electron rocket.

=== Photon satellite bus ===
Photon is a satellite bus based on Rocket Lab's Electron kick stage. It moves satellites into their appropriate orbits once boosted by rockets such as Electron. It is customizable for uses including LEO payload hosting, lunar flybys, and interplanetary missions.

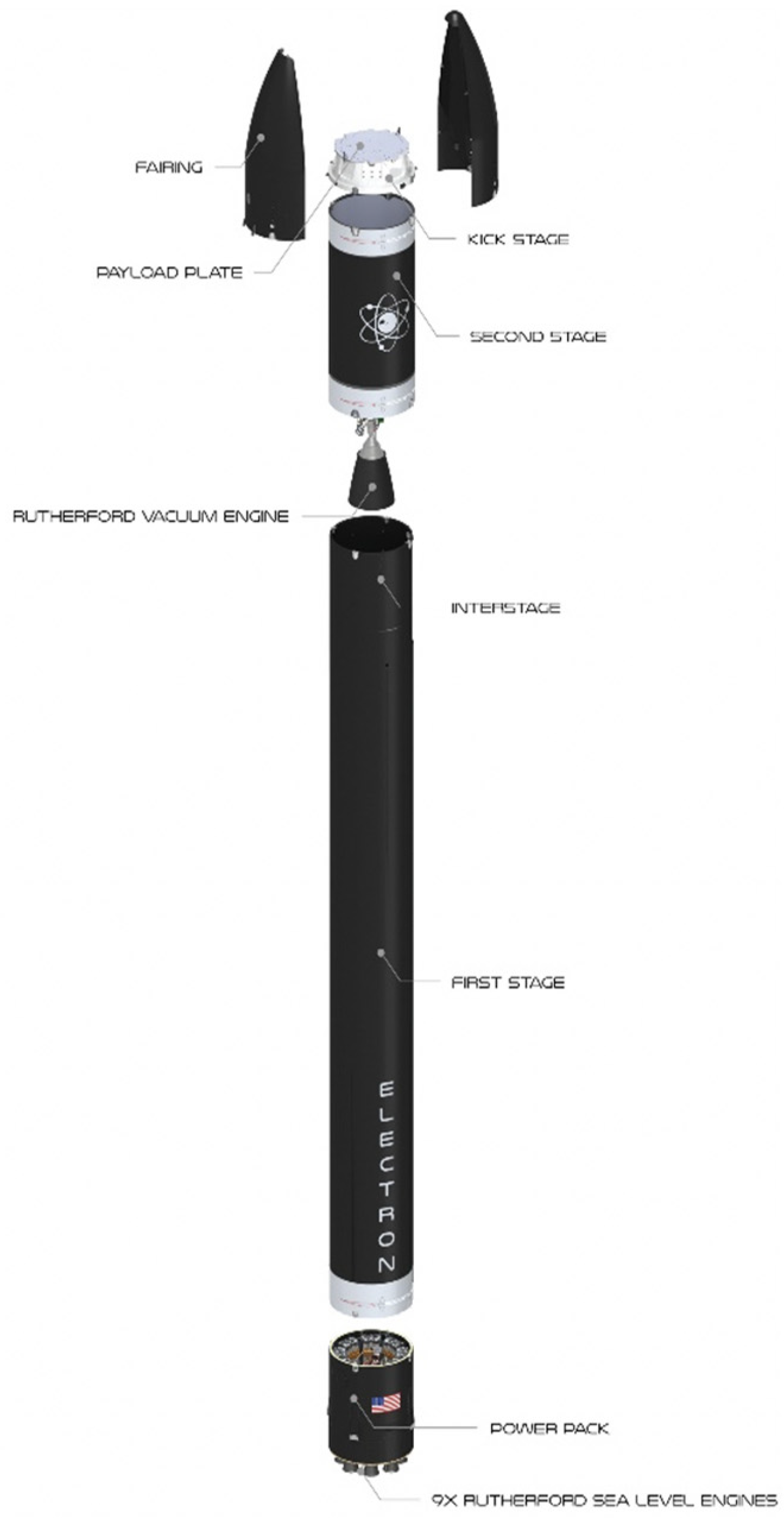
Location of Photon on the Electron rocket

Photon uses chemical propulsion for orbit adjustments. It can use a variety of engines, such as the Curie and HyperCurie engines, as well as engines from third-party sources, such as the one powering the EscaPADE mission.

Photon first launched in August 2020 on Rocket Lab's I Can't Believe It's Not Optical mission, where it served as a pathfinder. It has since flown three times. It flew the CAPSTONE mission.

Photon communicates on the S-band. Depending on the orbital inclination (37° to Sun-synchronous orbit), it is expected to have a payload capacity of 170 kg (370 lb). The interplanetary version was to have a 40 kg (88 lb) payload capacity.

HyperCurie is an evolution of the Curie engine, which comes in monopropellant and bipropellant versions, while the HyperCurie is hypergolic and electrically pumped.

== Notable missions ==
In February 2020, Rocket Lab was selected by NASA to launch the CAPSTONE (Cislunar Autonomous Positioning System Technology Operations and Navigation Experiment) on Electron and deploy it to lunar orbit from a Photon spacecraft bus. CAPSTONE is a microwave oven–sized CubeSat weighing 55 pounds and is the first spacecraft to test a unique, elliptical lunar orbit. As a pathfinder for the Lunar Gateway, a Moon-orbiting outpost that is part of NASA's Artemis program, CAPSTONE will help reduce risk for future spacecraft by validating innovative navigation technologies and verifying the dynamics of this halo-shaped orbit. Originally scheduled to launch from Virginia, the launch location was adjusted to Launch Complex 1 in New Zealand in August 2021 due to delays in certifying the NASA autonomous flight termination system planned to fly on Electron missions from Launch Complex 2. The CAPSTONE mission was successfully launched on Electron in June 2022 and on July 4th Photon's HyperCurie engine completed the final Translunar Injection Burn, successfully releasing the CAPSTONE spacecraft on a trajectory to lunar orbit. CAPSTONE completed its primary six-month mission and as of July 2023 was continuing an enhanced mission to deliver ongoing data in support of Artemis.

=== Viscous liquid monopropellant ===
In 2012, the company demonstrated a rocket propelled by a viscous liquid monopropellant (VLM) developed via DARPA and Office of Naval Research (NRL) work. The VLM was reported to be thixotropic, so that it behaves as a pseudo-solid until a shear force is applied, after which it flows like a liquid. The VLM density was reported to be comparable to solid-rocket propellant. The VLM reportedly required no special handling, was non-toxic, water-soluble, had low sensitivity to shock, a high ignition point, and was barely flammable in the atmosphere. The company earned a US patent on the system.

=== Instant Eyes ===
In 2011, Rocket Lab had a program called "Instant Eyes". The Instant Eyes unmanned aerial vehicle (UAV) was designed for military applications requiring a bird's-eye view, much like drones. Upon launch, the rocket with its 5 megapixel camera would reach an altitude of 2,500 feet (760 m) within 20 seconds.

=== Mars sample return ===
In October 2024, Rocket Lab was awarded a NASA contract to explore new concepts for a sample return from the surface of Mars.

== Facilities ==
=== Manufacturing ===
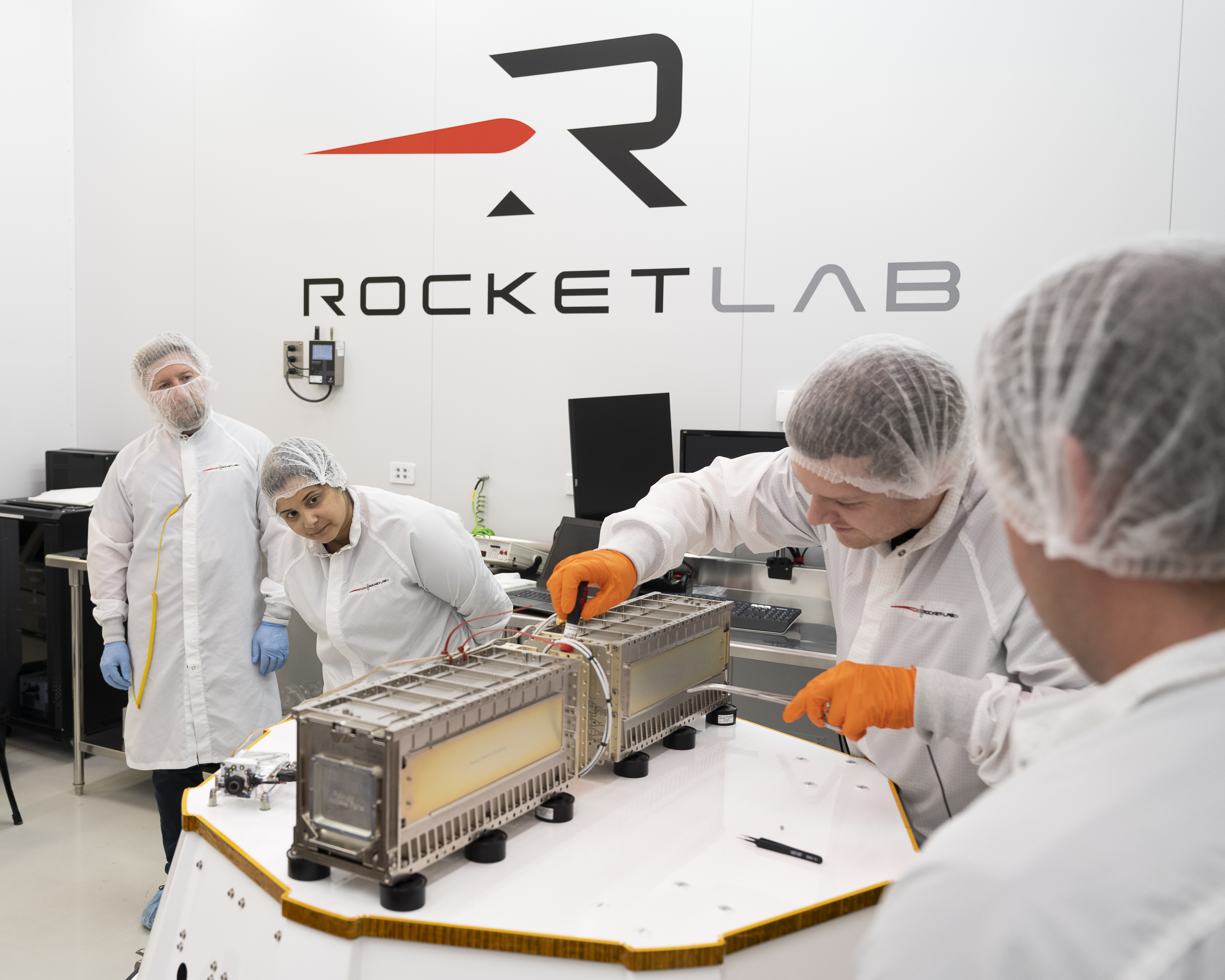
CubeSats being prepared at a processing facility near Launch Complex 1 in Māhia, New Zealand

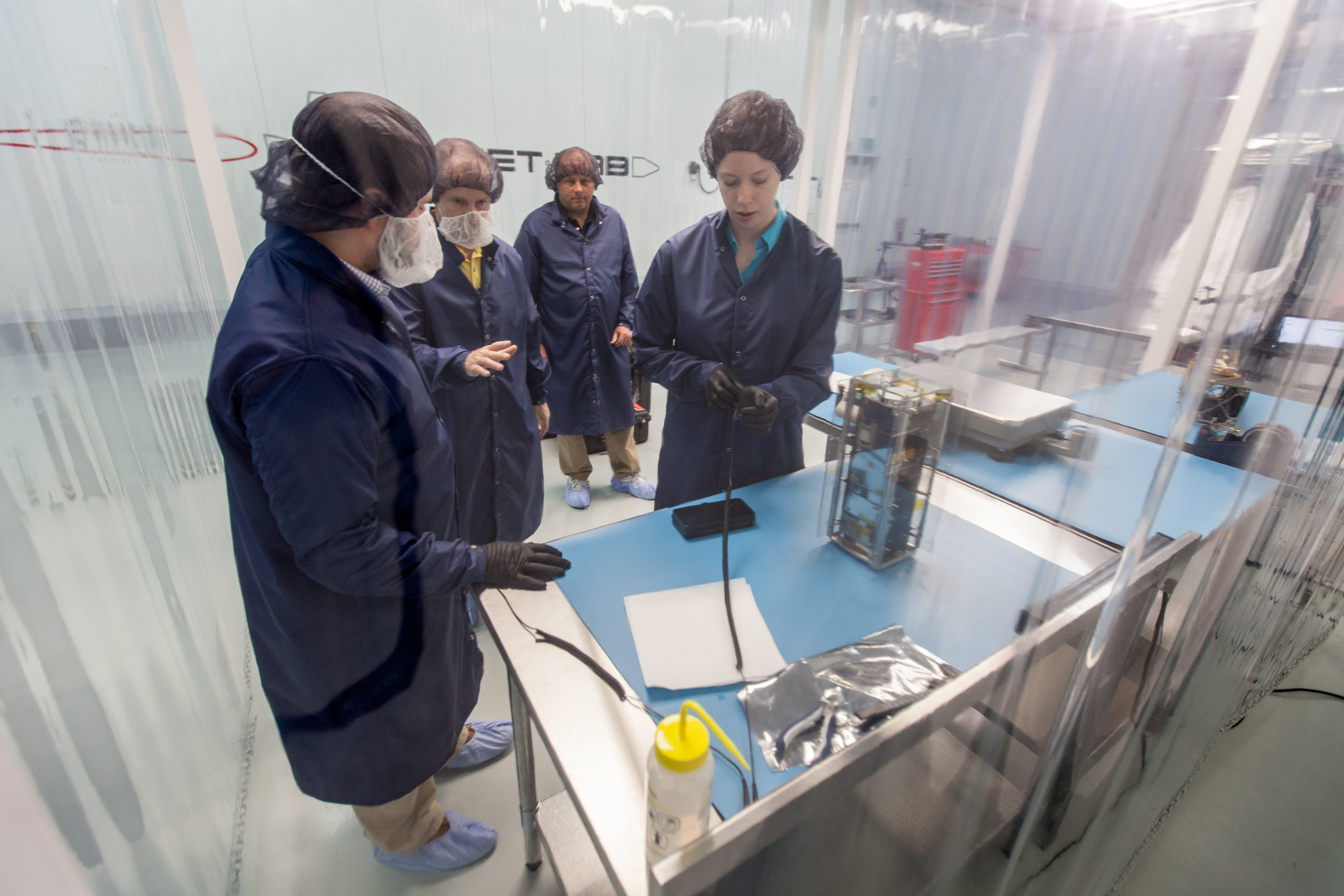
Payload preparation inside a Rocket Lab facility at Huntington Beach, California

In October 2018, the company revealed its new manufacturing facility in Auckland, New Zealand. It is intended for the production of propellant tanks and stage builds, and is in charge of the overall integration of launch vehicles at Launch Complex 1. The company's headquarters in Long Beach, California, produces their Rutherford engines and avionics.

The company's primary manufacturing facility is located in Long Beach, where rocket components are manufactured and assembled before traveling to the New Zealand launch site.

The manufacturing process begins with the production of the Electron rocket's first stage, which is built using carbon composite. The material is designed to be strong and lightweight.

Once the first stage is complete, it is transported to the New Zealand launch site, where the second stage and other components are added. The second stage is powered by a single Rutherford engine. The engine uses an electric pump-fed propulsion system.

Manufacturing the carbon composite components of the main flight structure has traditionally required 400 hours, involving extensive hand labor. In late 2019, Rocket Lab brought a new robotic manufacturing capability online to produce Electron's composite parts in 12 hours. The robot was named "Rosie the Robot", after The Jetsons character. The process can make all the carbon fiber structures as well as handle cutting, drilling, and sanding, such that the parts are ready for final assembly. The company objective as of November 2019 was to reduce the overall Electron manufacturing cycle to seven days.

Rutherford engine production uses additive manufacturing.

In October 2023, Rocket Lab announced it had acquired carbon composite manufacturing facilities, equipment and more than 50 team members from SailGP Technologies in Warkworth, New Zealand. SailGP was already a supplier to Rocket Lab, so when SailGP announced plans to move operations to the UK, Rocket Lab took over the facilities and employees to support a growing production rate for the Electron rocket and the rapid development of Neutron.

In October 2023, Rocket Lab officially opened its Engine Development Center in Long Beach in the former Virgin Orbit factory, where the company now builds Rutherford and Archimedes engines.

In November 2023, Rocket Lab announced plans to establish a Space Structures Complex in Middle River, Maryland, deliver a comprehensive suite of advanced composite products for the space industry and to further vertically integrate supply for the company's internal needs across launch and space systems. The site will also play a role in the development and long-term supply of carbon composite structures for Neutron.

Through the acquisition of SolAero, Rocket Lab also has facilities in Albuquerque, New Mexico. Through the acquisition of ASI, the company has facilities in Littleton, Colorado. Through the acquisition of Planetary Systems Corporation, the company has facilities in Maryland, and in Toronto, Canada through the acquisition of Sinclair Interplanetary. In September 2021, Rocket Lab announced it was expanding production of reaction wheels with a new production line in Auckland to support production of up to 2,000 reaction wheels per year for an undisclosed mega-constellation customer.

=== Launch Complex 1 ===
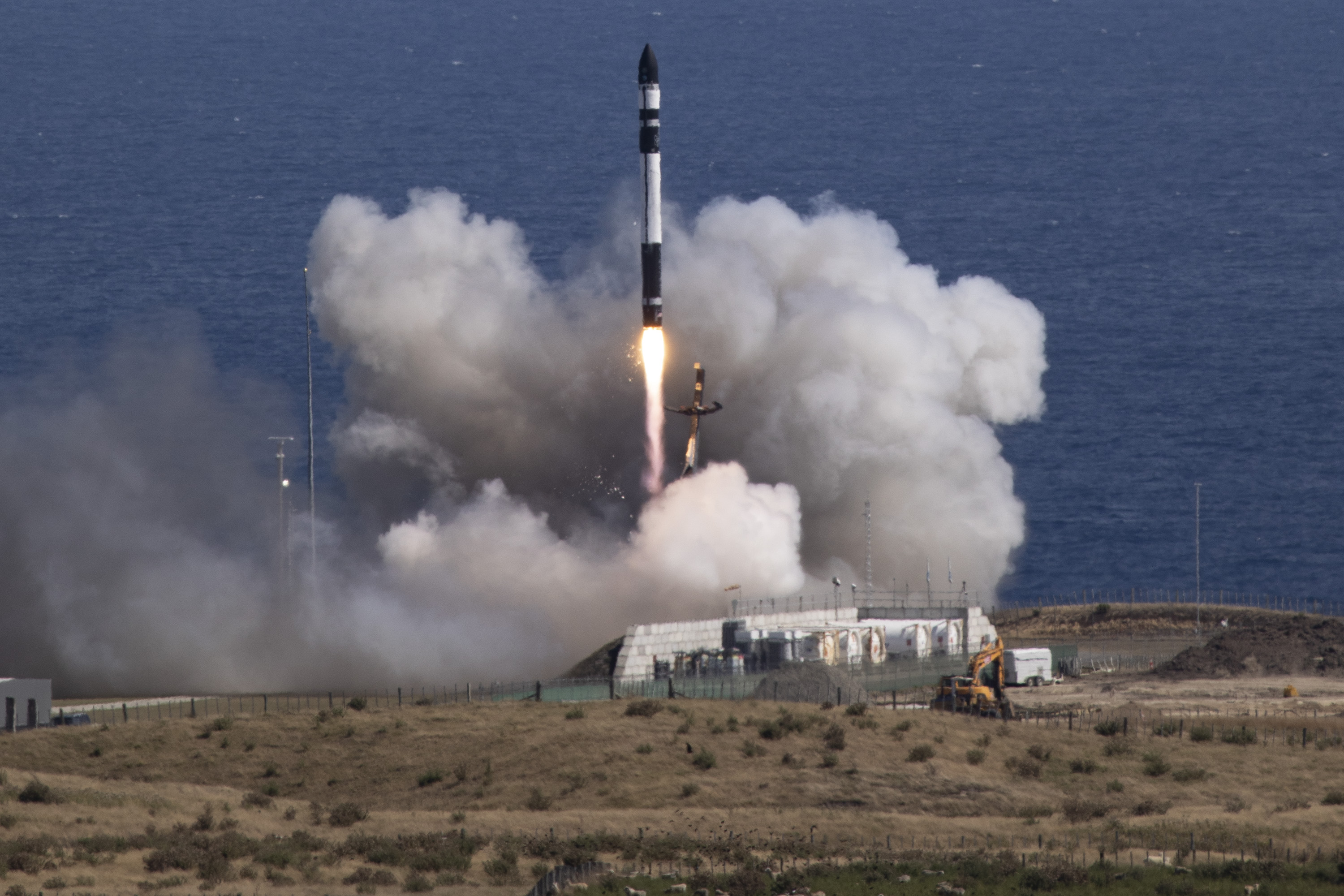
Launch Complex-1, Māhia Peninsula, New Zealand

The company's Launch Complex 1 (LC-1) is a private orbital launch site located on the Māhia Peninsula in New Zealand. The site consists of two launch pads, a vehicle integration facility, and a range control center. It was designed to support the company's Electron launch vehicle, which is optimized for small satellite launches.

The company originally planned to use Kaitorete Spit as its primary launch site and Mahia Peninsula as a secondary one. After encountering difficulty in obtaining resource consent for the Kaitorete Spit launch site, Rocket Lab announced in November 2015 that its primary launch site would be on the Māhia Peninsula, east of Wairoa on the North Island. The site is licensed to launch rockets every 72 hours for 30 years. Rocket Lab Launch Complex 1 (LC-1A) was officially opened on 26 September 2016 (UTC; 27 September NZDT). In December 2019, Rocket Lab began construction of a second pad on the Māhia Peninsula named Launch Complex 1B. On 28 February 2022, Launch Complex 1B hosted its first launch: "The Owl's Night Continues".

LC-1 has been in operation since 2017 and has supported numerous launches for a variety of customers, including NASA, the U.S. Air Force, and commercial satellite operators. LC-1A was the first part of LC-1 and was introduced in 2017. The first launch supported from LC-1A was "It's a Test". LC-1B was added later in February 2022. "The Owl's Night Continues" was the first launch supported from LC-1B.

=== Launch Complex 2 ===
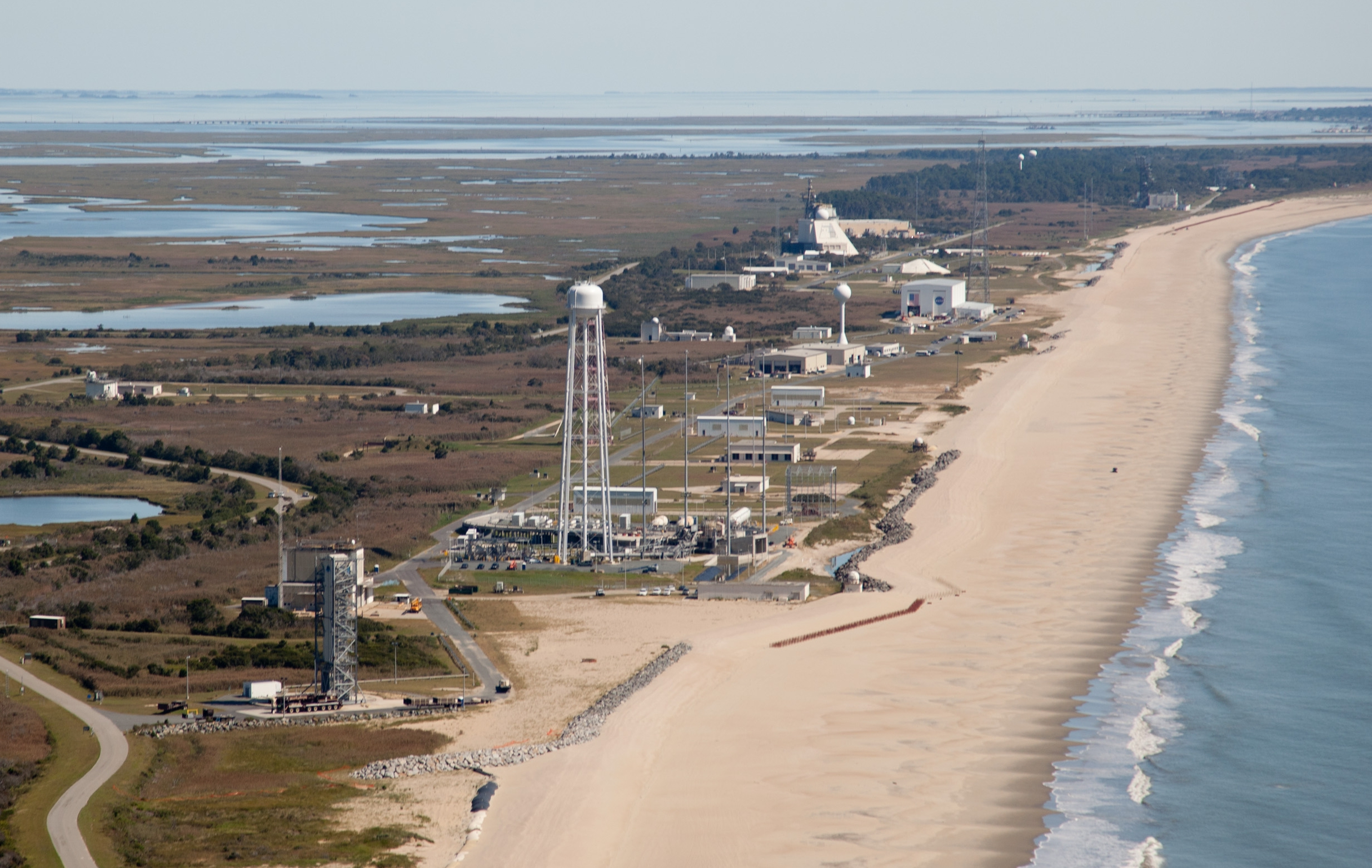
The Mid-Atlantic Regional Spaceport and, in the background, NASA's Wallops Flight Facility as seen in September 2012

In late 2018, the company selected MARS as its second launch site. Decision factors included infrastructure readiness, few launches from other companies, and the ability to supplement LC-1 orbital inclinations. It was expected to be capable of monthly launches. Launch Complex 2 (LC-2) is located within the fence line of MARS Launch Pad 0A. In December 2019, construction of the launch pad was completed, and Rocket Lab inaugurated LC-2.

The first Electron launch from LC-2 happened on 24 January 2023 during the "Virginia is for launch lovers" mission, named in celebration of the launch. The launch placed three satellites in orbit. Two more missions were later launched from LC-2.

=== Launch Complex 3 ===
In October 2023, construction of a new launch site between LP-0A and LP-0B was observed. The launch site (for Neutron) will be named Launch Pad 0D (LP-0D). Rocket Lab refers to LP-0D as Launch Complex 3 or LC-3 (located at 37.8321693°N 75.4899046°W). Progress was seen in April 2024 with the installation of the water tower. Concrete work was reportedly completed in May 2024.

On 28 August 2025, LC-3 was officially opened with an official opening ceremony hosted directly at LC-3, with attendees such as Rocket Lab team members, founding staff, and even official representatives, including the Governor of Virginia, Glenn Youngkin.

== See also ==
- Firefly Aerospace – American aerospace company
- SpaceX – American aerospace and AI conglomerate
- Blue Origin – American aerospace company
- Stoke Space – American aerospace company
