= Venus Life Finder =

Planned 2020s private Venus astrobiology probe

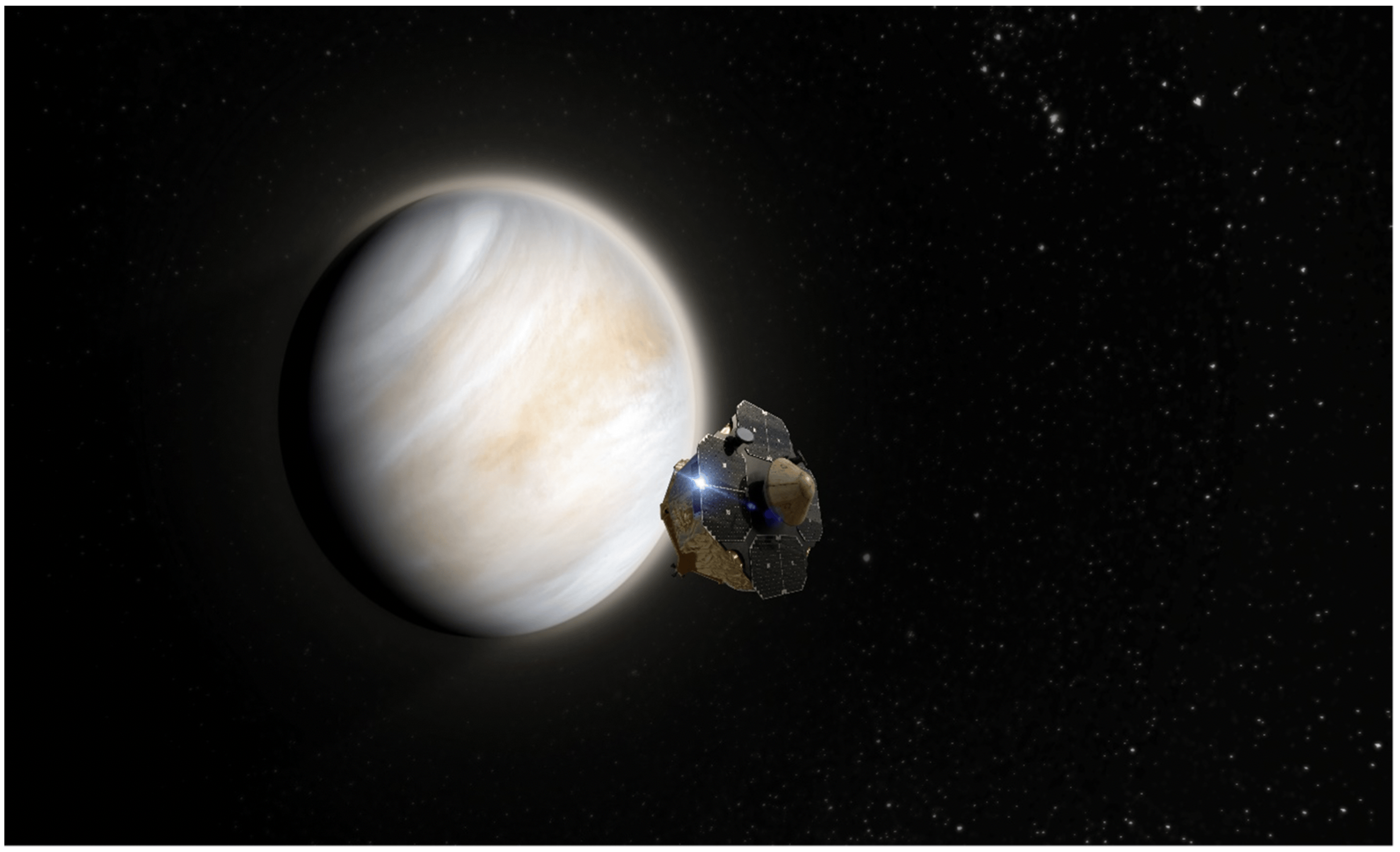
- Artist's impression of the Venus Life Finder's Photon Explorer over Venus, carrying the atmospheric probe before deployment
- Mission type: Atmospheric Probe
- Operator: Rocket Lab / MIT
- Website: Rocket Lab; MIT

Spacecraft properties
- Bus: Photon Explorer
- Manufacturer: Rocket Lab
- Dry mass: 17 kg (37 lb)
- Payload mass: 1 kg (2.2 lb)

Start of mission
- Launch date: TBA
- Rocket: Electron
- Launch site: MARS, LC-3
- Contractor: Rocket Lab

Flyby of Moon
- Closest approach: 2026 - 2027? (planned)

Venus atmospheric probe
- Spacecraft component: Probe
- Atmospheric entry: 2026 - 2027? (planned)

Transponders
- Band: S-band
- Venus Life Finder Missions

Venus Life Finder is a planned Venus space probe designed to detect signs of life in the Venusian atmosphere. Slated to be the first private mission to another planet, the spacecraft is being developed by Rocket Lab in collaboration with a team from the Massachusetts Institute of Technology. The spacecraft will consist of a Photon Explorer cruise stage which will send a small atmospheric probe into Venus with a single instrument, an autofluorescing nephelometer, to search for organic compounds within Venus's atmosphere. It is the first mission in the Morning Star Venus exploration program.

Originally planned for launch in May 2023, the probe is now planned to launch when the Neutron rocket will be ready.

== Mission goals ==
Research published in 2020 indicated the presence of phosphine (PH_{3}) in Venus's atmosphere, resulting in a widespread public and academic interest in the possibility of life in the Venusian atmosphere. Although the probe will not directly search for phosphine, it will search for organic compounds in Venus's atmosphere, which would indicate potentially habitable conditions within Venus's cloud layer. Additionally, the mission will demonstrate an inexpensive, deep space mission with a small spacecraft and small launch vehicle, as well as mature the interplanetary Photon spacecraft. Peter Beck, CEO of Rocket Lab commented that the Venus Life Finder represents a "real opportunity in the market for these incremental little missions in between [NASA missions]".

Morning Star is hoped to be the first of a series of small missions to Venus to better understand the planet.

== Spacecraft design and instrumentation ==
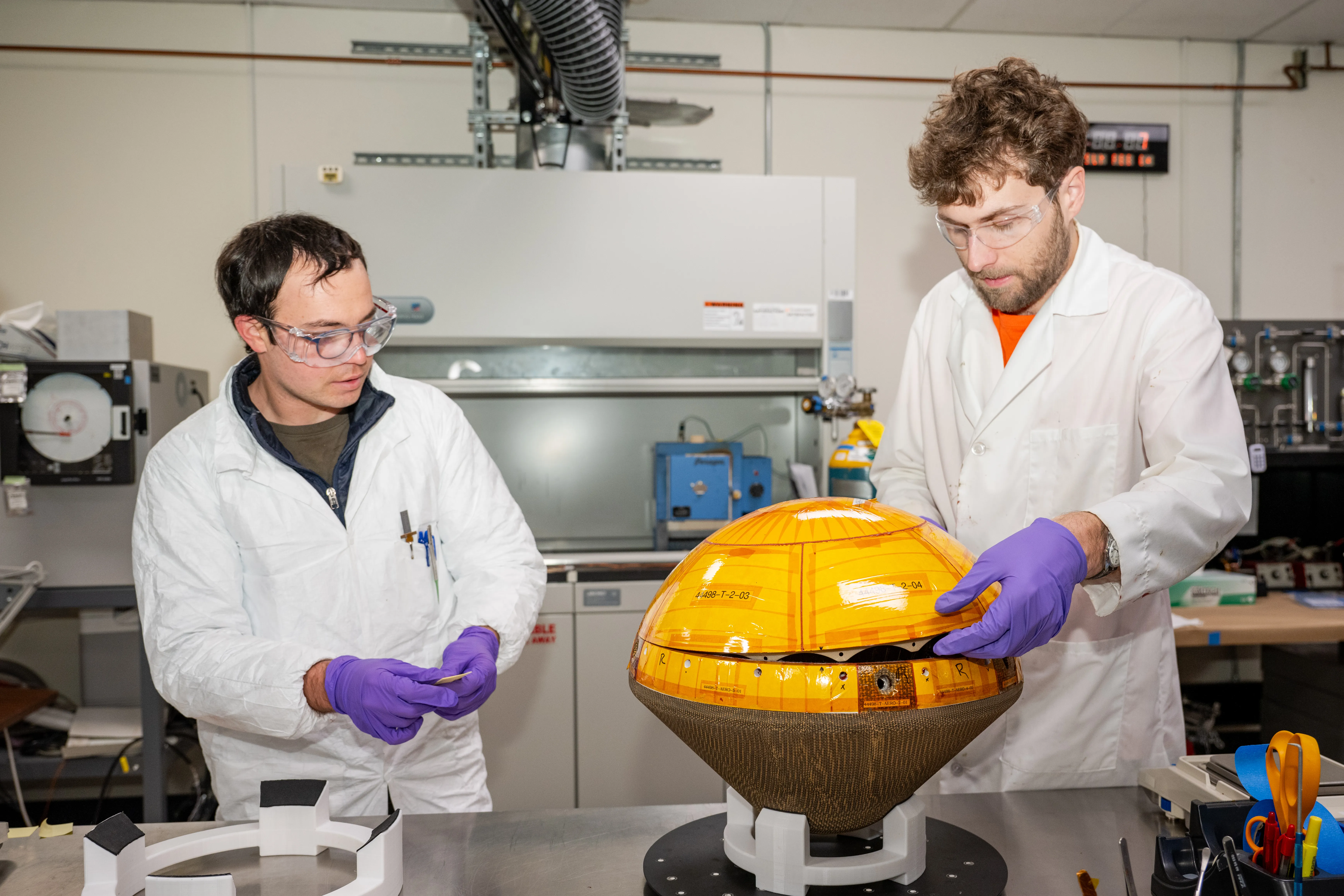
NASA engineers at Ames Research Center install the heat shield on the Venus atmospheric probe

The spacecraft consists of two main components- a Photon Explorer cruise stage, and a small atmospheric probe with a autofluorescing nephelometer.

The Explorer cruise stage, first developed for NASA's CAPSTONE, is the interplanetary variant of the Photon satellite bus. The Explorer cruise stage, a self contained spacecraft with solar arrays for generating power, an attitude control system and a HyperCurie engine for propulsion, will remain attached to the atmospheric probe until 30 minutes prior to atmospheric entry.

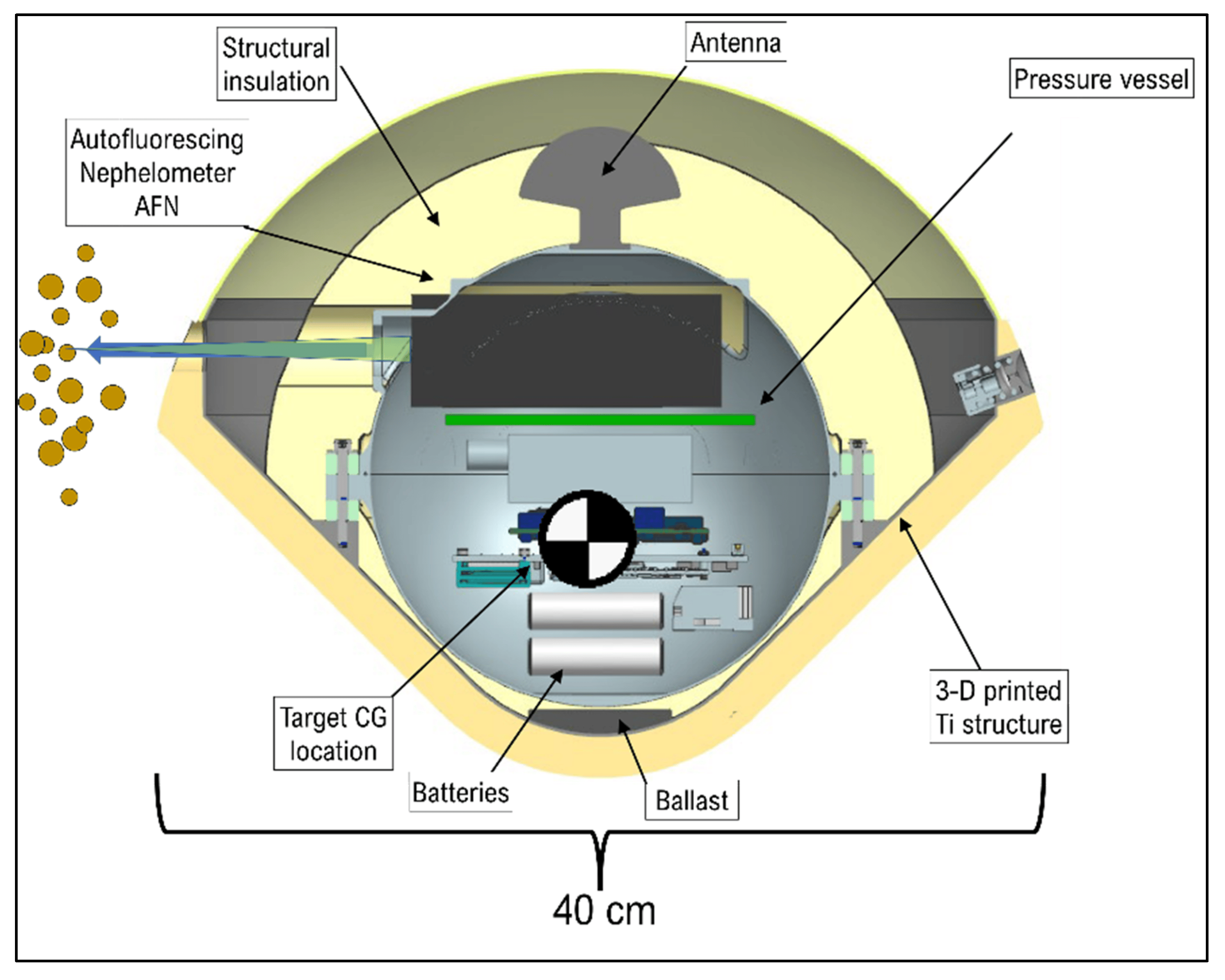
Cutaway diagram of the Venus atmospheric probe

The 17 kg (37 lb) cone-shaped atmospheric probe measures just 40 cm (16 in) across, which was chosen to accommodate the electronics and the focal length of the nephelometer. The probe outer mould line is a scaled-down version of the Deep Space 2 probe. Like the Deep Space 2 probe, the probe carries no parachute nor does it eject its heat shield. The nephelometer, flight computer, and radio are housed in a spherical titanium pressure vessel encased within a layer of insulation to protect the electronics and instrument from the corrosive Venusian atmosphere and maintain acceptable temperatures.

The probe contains one scientific instrument; the Autofluorescence Nephelometer, which will project a 440 nm diode laser into the Venusian atmosphere through a fused silicate window. During the probe's descent, cloud particles which pass through the laser beam will scatter light, and if organic, these particles may also fluoresce. The scattered and fluoresced light will be collected through the same fused silicate window by a lens, from which the existence of organics, as well as particle size, shape, composition and concentration can be ascertained.

Venus Life Finder is being developed by a team of fewer than thirty people, led by Sara Seager of the Massachusetts Institute of Technology. The mission cost is estimated at less than 10 million US dollars, funded by Rocket Lab, MIT and undisclosed philanthropists. Peter Beck, CEO of Rocket Lab, has said that the spacecraft is a "nights-and-weekends project," and that it "gets pushed to the side all the time, but [they are] still working on it."

== Mission profile ==
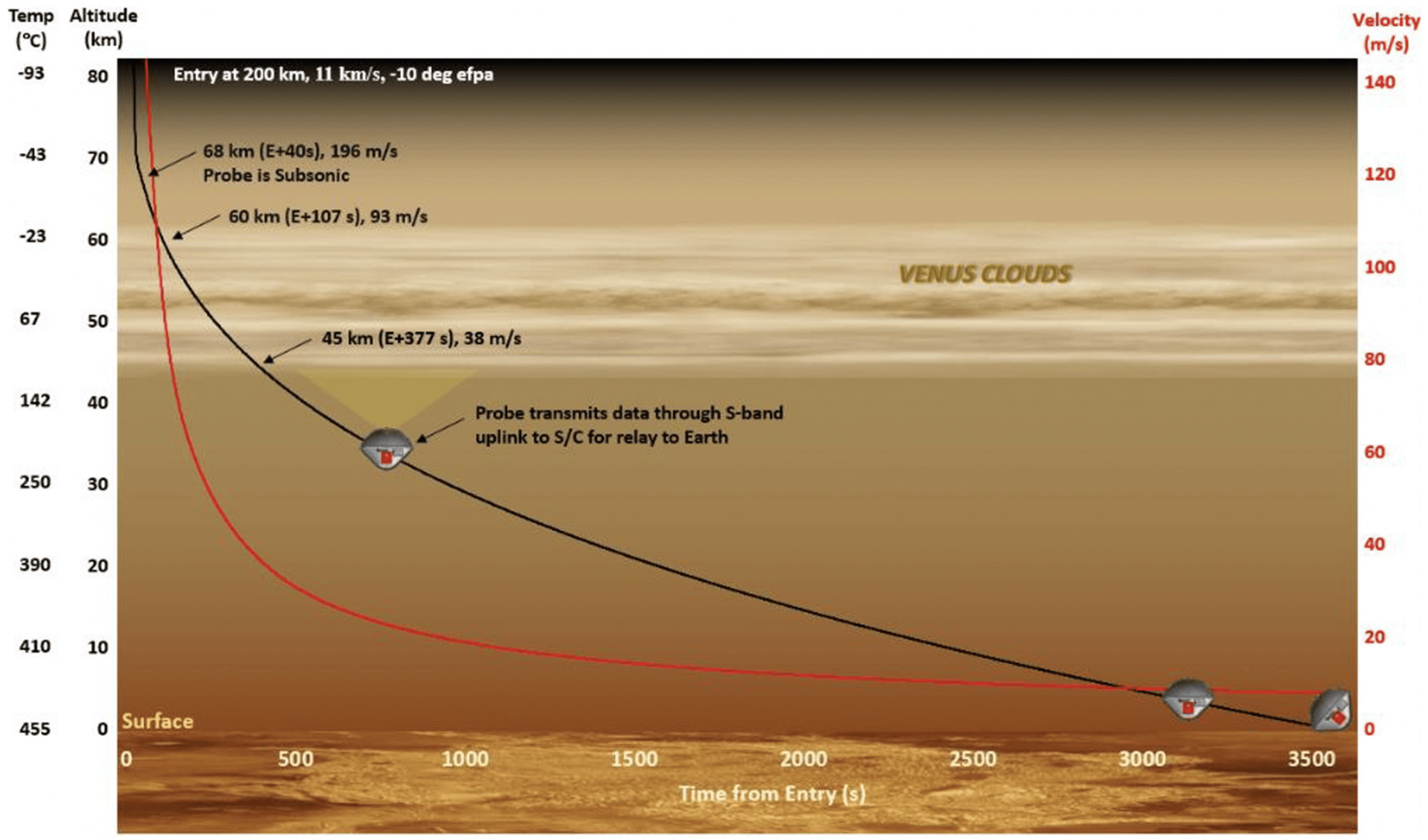
Diagram of Venus Life Finder's probe's operations from atmospheric entry to surface impact

Venus Life Finder was originally planned to launch in January 2025 by an Electron launch vehicle from Rocket Lab's Launch Complex 1 on the Māhia Peninsula in New Zealand. After being delivered to low Earth orbit, the Explorer cruise stage will perform a series of burns culminating in a lunar gravity assist which will send the spacecraft to Venus. During the 128 day interplanetary cruise, the spacecraft will make occasional mid-course corrections in preparation for arrival at Venus.

The probe will separate from the Explorer cruise stage 30 minutes before Venus atmospheric entry, originally planned to occur on 13 May 2025. Entering on the night-side to minimize background light for the autofluorescence nephelometer instrument, the probe will experience a peak g-force of 60 Gs and will descend through the atmosphere without a parachute. The probe will have just five minutes in the cloud layer, between 65 km (40 mi) to 45 km (28 mi) in altitude, to perform its measurements. The probe will directly transmit its data to Earth by S-band until expected loss of signal thirty minutes after atmospheric entry, after which it will impact the Venusian surface. Due to constraints on the power of the transmitter and limited transmission time, the data collected will be sent through the channel of 125 bytes/second bandwidth. To optimize transmission, a neural network will be trained on laboratory measurements and theoretical calculations to integrate detector data and extract the most critical information. The network's outputs, together with the most important raw data, will be transmitted to Earth.

== See also ==
- DAVINCI, a descent probe planned for 2031
- List of missions to Venus
