= ESCAPADE =

2025 NASA mission to Mars

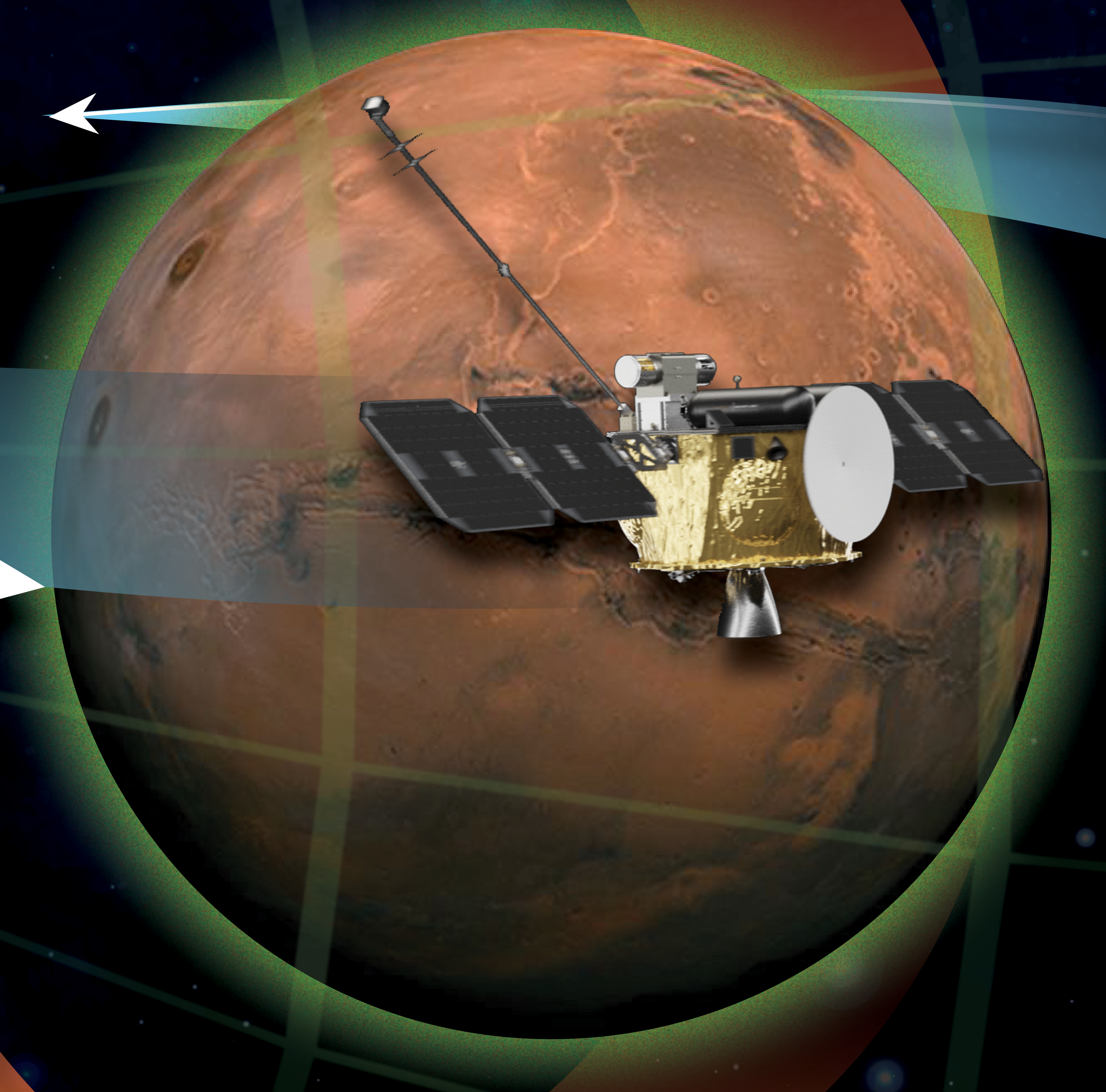
- Artist's impression of ESCAPADE on Martian orbit
- Names: SIMPLEx-4A (Blue); SIMPLEx-4B (Gold)
- Mission type: Mars orbiters
- Operator: NASA
- COSPAR ID: 2025-260A (Blue); 2025-260B (Gold)
- SATCAT no.: 66451 (Blue); 66452 (Gold)
- Website: escapade.ssl.berkeley.edu
- Mission duration: Total: 3 years, 7 months (planned); 1 year, 4 days (elapsed); Science mission: 11 months (planned)

Spacecraft properties
- Spacecraft: Blue and Gold
- Bus: Explorer
- Manufacturer: Rocket Lab
- Launch mass: Total: 1,070 kg (2,360 lb); Individual: 535 kg (1,179 lb)
- Dry mass: Total: 418 kg (922 lb); Individual: 209 kg (461 lb)
- Dimensions: Stowed: 1.20 × 1.65 × 1.09 m (3 ft 11 in × 5 ft 5 in × 3 ft 7 in); Deployed: 4.88 × 1.65 × 1.09 m (16.0 × 5.4 × 3.6 ft)
- Power: Science (nominal) mode: 128 watts Mars (aphelion): 288 watts

Start of mission
- Launch date: November 13, 2025, 20:55:01 UTC (3:55:01 pm EST)
- Rocket: New Glenn 7×2
- Launch site: Cape Canaveral, LC-36A
- Contractor: Blue Origin

Orbital parameters
- Reference system: Areocentric
- Periareion altitude: 160 km (99 mi)
- Apoareion altitude: 7,000–10,000 km (4,300–6,200 mi)
- Inclination: 60°

Flyby of Earth
- Closest approach: November 7–9, 2026
- Distance: 1,046–1,609 km (650–1,000 mi)

Mars orbiter
- Orbital insertion: September 2027 (planned)

Transponders
- Bandwidth: X band
Instruments
- EMAG: ESCAPADE Magnetometer
- EESA: ESCAPADE Electrostatic Analyzer
- ELP: ESCAPADE Langmuir Probe
- VISIONS: Visible and Infrared Observation System
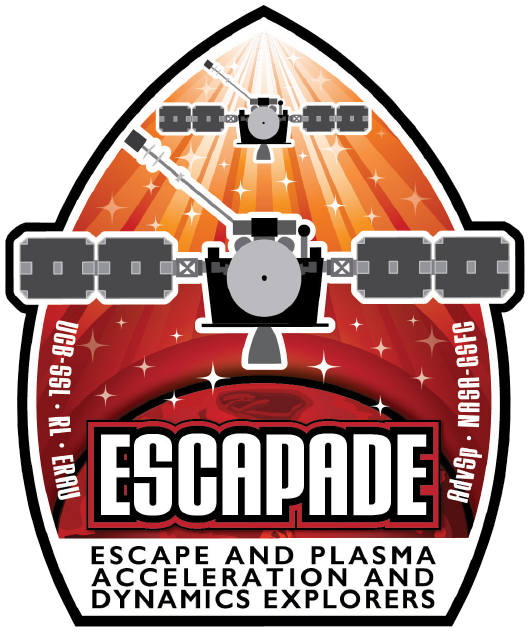
- Mission logo SIMPLEx program

Escape and Plasma Acceleration and Dynamics Explorers (ESCAPADE) is a spacecraft mission to Mars consisting of two spacecraft known as Blue and Gold, which launched in November 2025. The twin spacecraft will study Mars' magnetosphere and how solar wind contributed to the loss of most of the planet's atmosphere over Solar System history. In addition to its scientific goals, the mission is designed to demonstrate low-cost planetary space exploration. The mission is led by UC Berkeley's Space Sciences Laboratory with Dr. Robert Lillis as Principal Investigator. It is part of NASA's SIMPLEx program.

ESCAPADE is planned to enter Mars orbit in September, 2027.

== Spacecraft ==
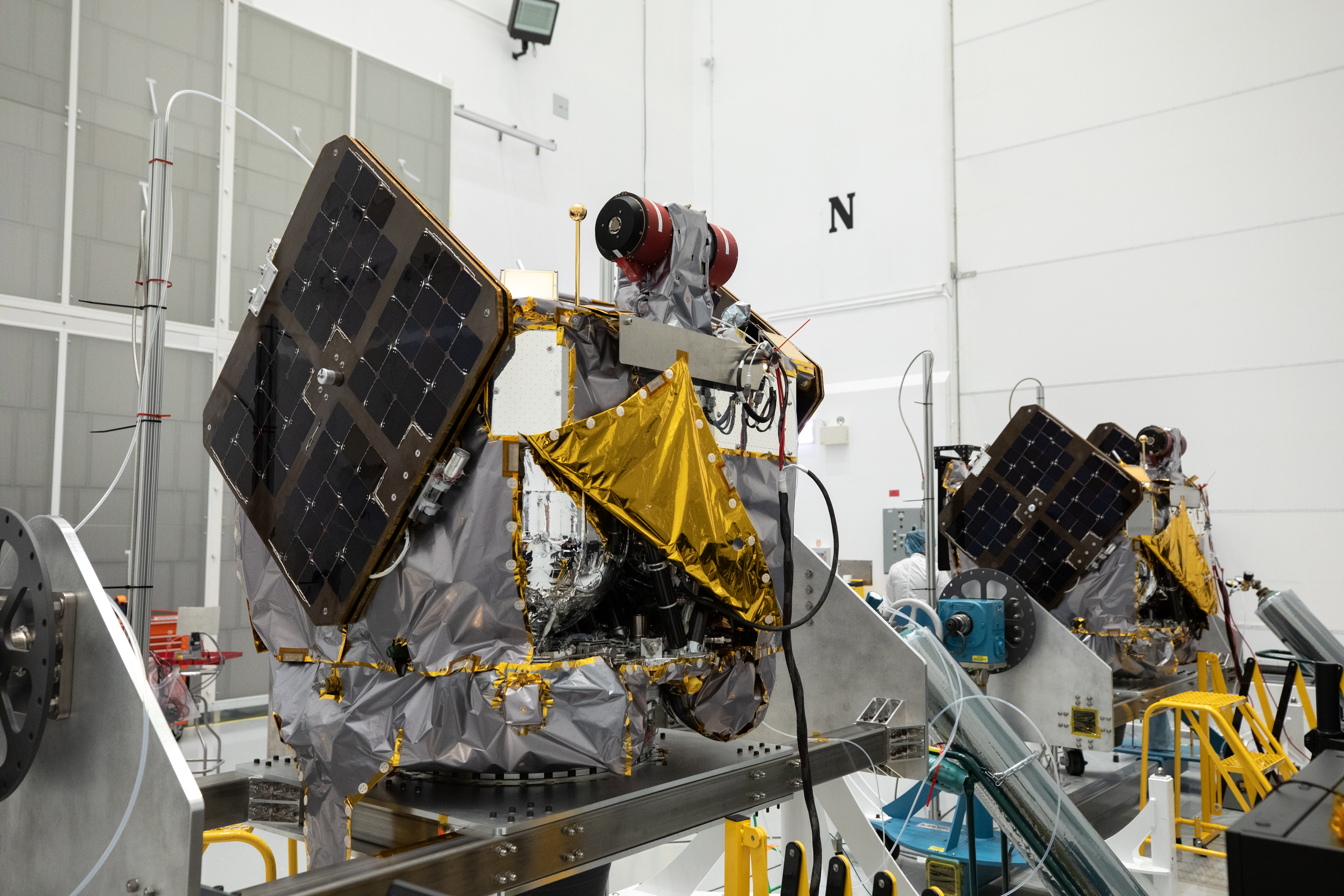
Both ESCAPADE spacecraft unboxed at Astrotech

Each identical ESCAPADE spacecraft has a dry mass of ~200 kg (440 lb), with a wet mass of 535 kg (1,179 lb). The spacecraft bus is based on the Rocket Lab Explorer spacecraft bus and is approximately 1.20 × 1.65 × 1.09 m (3 ft 11 in × 5 ft 5 in × 3 ft 7 in). The spacecraft is powered by two solar array wings that when fully deployed is approximately 4.88 × 1.65 × 1.09 m (16.0 × 5.4 × 3.6 ft). The spacecraft buses were drastically enlarged from the original mission that was supposed to hitch a ride on Psyche. After a change in launch vehicle made it impossible for the smaller dual orbiters to reach Mars while attached to Psyche, a separate launcher had to be used which enabled larger spacecraft buses. The original dimensions for each ESCAPADE spacecraft were 90 kg (200 lb) and 60 × 70 × 90 cm (24 × 28 × 35 in).

Chemical propulsion is provided by thrusters developed by Arianespace. Reaction wheels, inertial measurement units, and star trackers are used to maintain orientation, with cold gas thrusters to desaturate (Note: Over time, the momentum stored in reaction wheels can reach the wheel's maximum speed, a situation called 'saturation.' The wheel thus needs to be slowed down, imparting a torque; to prevent undesired rotation of the spacecraft as the wheel spins down, the torque is cancelled out using cold gas thrusters, in a maneuver called 'desaturation.') the wheels. Communications are in X-band via a 60 cm (24 in) diameter dish antenna. A 200 cm (79 in) boom extends above the spacecraft, hosting the EMAG and ELP mNLP sensors.

== Science ==
The science goals of ESCAPADE are to:

- understand the processes controlling the structure of Mars' hybrid magnetosphere and how it guides ion flows
- understand how energy and momentum are transported from the solar wind through Mars' magnetosphere
- understand the processes controlling the flow of energy and matter into and out of the collisional atmosphere

There are four science experiments onboard each identical spacecraft: EMAG, EESA, ELP, and VISIONS.

EMAG, which was developed by the NASA Goddard Spaceflight Center, is a magnetometer that will measure DC magnetic fields up to 1000 nT, mounted at the end of the boom to reduce magnetic noise from the spacecraft.

EESA is an electrostatic analyzer developed at UC Berkeley to measure the energies, fluxes, and masses of suprathermal ions from 2 eV to 20 keV and energies and fluxes of suprathermal electrons from 3 eV to 10 keV. It is mounted on the upper deck of the spacecraft bus, with a 240° x 120° field of view for electrons and 247.5° x 90° field of view for ions.

ELP, developed by the Space and Atmospheric Instrumentation Lab at Embry-Riddle Aeronautical University, is a Langmuir probe consisting of three separate sensors: the multi-needle Langmuir probe (mNLP) consists of 4 thin needles mounted in two pairs ~3/4 way up the boom and measures thermal electron density; the two planar ion probes (PIPs) are mounted on the instrument deck and measure thermal ion density, and the floating potential probe (FPP) is also mounted on the spacecraft deck and measures changes in relative spacecraft electrostatic potential.

VISIONS (Visible and Infrared Observation System), developed by Northern Arizona University, is a dual wavelength camera that captures images in both visible and infrared wavelength ranges simultaneously. VISIONS will uniquely be able to capture Mars in one frame unlike other Mars orbiters that are closer to the planet which will make it possible to study seasonal changes in the size of the polar caps and capture images of Mars' aurorae. In addition to having scientific objectives, ESCAPADE functions as a technology demonstration to show how low-cost commercial-off-the-shelf (COTS) products can operate in an interplanetary mission.

== Trajectory ==
The design of the ESCAPADE mission has been developed by Advanced Space LLC and originally called for ESCAPADE to be injected directly into an interplanetary trajectory. After several delays and revisions, based on the final mission plan, ESCAPADE launched to a staging orbit about a million miles away, curving around the Earth-Sun L_{2} Lagrange point on November 13, 2025. Until November 2026, both spacecraft had been loitering there, studying space weather and waiting for the Mars transfer window's opening. ESCAPADE changed course to dive within 600 km of Earth for a pair of gravity assists, executing its escape burns to place it on a trajectory to Mars. Both flybys were successfully completed with "Blue" performing its own on November 7, and "Gold" following two days later on November 9.

ESCAPADE will execute one major and several minor propulsive course correction maneuvers during its 11-month cruise to Mars. The twin probes will reach Mars a few days apart and each will fire its engines for about 11 minutes to enter a highly elliptical orbit. Over the following six months, the orbit will be lowered and circularized until it reaches the nominal science orbit.

Once the nominal science orbit is achieved by mid-2028, Science Campaign A will begin which involves both spacecraft flying in the same orbit at varying distances from one another, ~170 × 8,400 km (110 × 5,220 mi) (5.66 hours) with an inclination of 65 degrees. This will last approximately six months.

At the conclusion of Science Campaign A, Blue will lower its apoapsis to 7,000 km (4,300 mi) and Gold will raise its apoapsis to 10,000 km (6,200 mi) to begin Science Campaign B. With different orbital periods (4.9 and 6.6 hours), the orbits will precess (due to Mars' non-uniform gravity field) at different rates and thus separate, allowing simultaneous measurements of distant parts of the Mars magnetosphere. This campaign will operate for approximately five months until the end of the nominal science mission.

Animation of ESCAPADE

Staging Orbit in the Sun-Earth Rotating Frame

Sun-Centered Interplanetary Transfer

Sun · ESCAPADE-Gold/Blue · Earth · Mars · SE-L2 point

== Timeline ==
The EscaPADE mission made a spacecraft to study the loss of Mars's atmosphere. The mission is led by the University of California, Berkeley, and is collaborating with Advanced Space and Rocket Lab. The spacecraft launched on November 13, 2025, from Launch Complex 36A at Cape Canaveral Space Force Station, Florida. The spacecraft is planned to enter Mars orbit by September 2027.

The Small Innovative Missions for Planetary Exploration ("SIMPLEx") program was intended as a program to select small, low-cost space missions to fly as secondary payloads on other NASA missions. As a ride-along mission on another launch, not a main mission, they were intended to have low cost and tolerate a higher level of risk than other NASA missions.

ESCAPADE was originally selected from a competition to be a low-cost ride-along "mission of opportunity" to hitch a ride to Mars with the Psyche spacecraft, and drop off as the spacecraft made a fly-by of Mars. Thus, it had an anticipated launch cost of nearly nothing. However, the launch of the Psyche mission was awarded to Falcon Heavy, meaning that Psyche will make a higher-energy flyby of Mars, and ESCAPADE mission plans could not be updated in time for the launch. Rather than cancel the mission, NASA announced that it would go on a different launch vehicle, and requested bids from industry for the launch.

In February 2023, Blue Origin won the contract to launch the mission on the first flight of the New Glenn launch vehicle in October 2024, at a cost of ~$20 million. The entire cost of ESCAPADE was $75 million, with $55 million being the cost for the spacecraft buses and science instruments and $20 million to cover the cost for the New Glenn rocket launch. For comparison NASA's MAVEN orbiter launched in 2013 cost $582 million to build and launch and the failed 1999 Mars Polar Lander cost $165 million to build and launch. ESCAPADE's smaller cost is similar to ISRO's $74 million Mars Orbiter Mission.

In August 2024 the spacecraft arrived at the launch site. On September 6, 2024, the launch was delayed by NASA to spring 2025 at the earliest due to schedule and technical issues involved with the mission's New Glenn launch vehicle, which was set to debut with the launch of these spacecraft. NASA said: "The agency's decision to stand down was based on a review of launch preparations and discussions with Blue Origin, the Federal Aviation Administration, and Space Launch Delta 45 Range Safety Organization, as well as NASA's Launch Services Program and Science Mission Directorate. The decision was made to avoid significant cost, schedule, and technical challenges associated with potentially removing fuel from the spacecraft in the event of a launch delay, which could be caused by a number of factors."

A launch attempt on November 9, 2025, was scrubbed due to weather conditions. On November 10, the Federal Aviation Administration temporarily banned commercial rocket launches during the daytime due to the ongoing government shutdown. However, the FAA granted Blue Origin a waiver for this launch. The second launch attempt on November 12 was scrubbed due to solar storms. Finally, the mission successfully launched at 3:55:01 PM on November 13, 2025.

Mission timeline
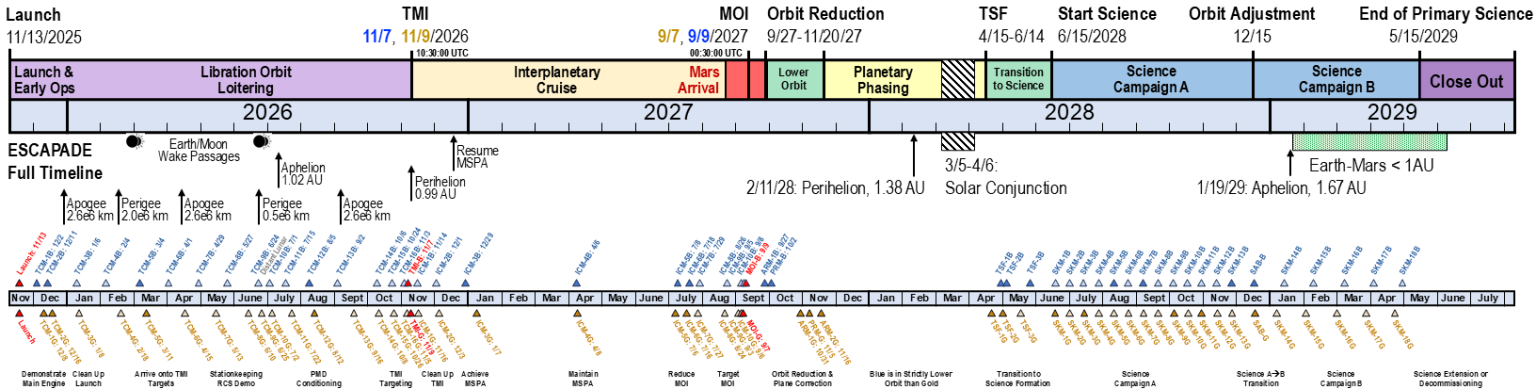

Attempt	Planned	Result	Turnaround	Reason	Decision point	Weather go (%)	Notes
1	9 Nov 2025, 2:45:00 pm	Scrubbed	—	Weather	9 Nov 2025, 4:13 pm (T−00:04:33)	65	Cumulonimbus clouds in launch area.
2	12 Nov 2025, 2:45:00 pm	Scrubbed	3 days 0 hours 0 minutes	Weather	12 Nov 2025, 9:56 am	95	Solar storm.
3	13 Nov 2025, 3:55:01 pm	Success	1 day 1 hour 10 minutes				First stage successfully landed.

== See also ==
- List of missions to Mars
- Venus Life Finder
