= Curie (rocket engine) =

Rocket engine

- Country of origin: New Zealand
- First flight: 21 January 2018
- Designer: Rocket Lab
- Manufacturer: Rocket Lab
- Application: Upper/kick stage
- Status: In production

Liquid-fuel engine
- Propellant: Unknown bipropellant
- Cycle: Pressure-fed engine

Configuration
- Chamber: 1

Performance
- Thrust, vacuum: 120 N (27 lbf)
- Restarts: multiple

Used in
- Electron (kickstage); Photon

Curie is a liquid-propellant rocket engine designed and manufactured by Rocket Lab. A bipropellant is used for the propulsion of the third stage/kick stage of the Electron rocket, as well as the Photon. The composition of the propellant is a trade secret.

The kick stage rocket produces 120 newtons (27 lb_{f}) of thrust, and has a specific impulse of approximately 320 seconds.

It was first used on 21 January 2018 during Rocket Lab's first successful orbital rocket launch, and helped to boost two small CubeSats, the weather and ship-tracking Lemur-2 CubeSats built by the company Spire Global, into a circular orbit.

== Description ==
The Curie engine, named after Polish scientist Marie Skłodowska–Curie, is a small liquid-propellant rocket engine designed to release "small satellites from the constricting parameters of primary payload orbits and enables them to fully reach their potential, including faster deployment of small satellite constellations and better positioning for Earth imaging". It is 3D printed.

=== Monopropellant version ===
The Electron third stage, which is powered by Curie, is equipped with its own reaction control system, avionics, power, and communication systems. During the first flight in January 2018 where Curie was tested, the Electron third stage—also referred to as the "kick stage"—coasted for roughly 40 minutes after successfully deploying an Earth-imaging Dove satellite built by the company Planet Labs, then ignited the Curie engine on its first in-space test. After this test, the stage was left in orbit. However, Rocket Lab stated that future launches would have the stage deorbited after releasing their payloads to prevent addition to space debris.

While Rocket Lab is not known to have specified the monopropellant used by Curie, in 2012 Rocket Lab demonstrated the use of a non-toxic Viscous Liquid Monopropellant (VLM) that it had developed.

=== Bi-propellant version ===
In August 2020 Rocket Lab indicated that the kick stage uses an unspecified liquid bi-propellant fuel for the Curie engine.

=== HyperCurie ===
Rocket Lab has also developed a version of the Curie engine with more thrust called HyperCurie. While Curie is pressure-fed, HyperCurie is electric pump-fed. The engine was used on the CAPSTONE lunar mission that launched in June 2022. HyperCurie is set to be used on the upcoming Photon mission to Venus, Venus Life Finder.

== See also ==
- Rutherford (rocket engine)
- Archimedes (rocket engine)
