= Rocket Lab Photon =

Satellite bus made by Rocket Lab

Photon
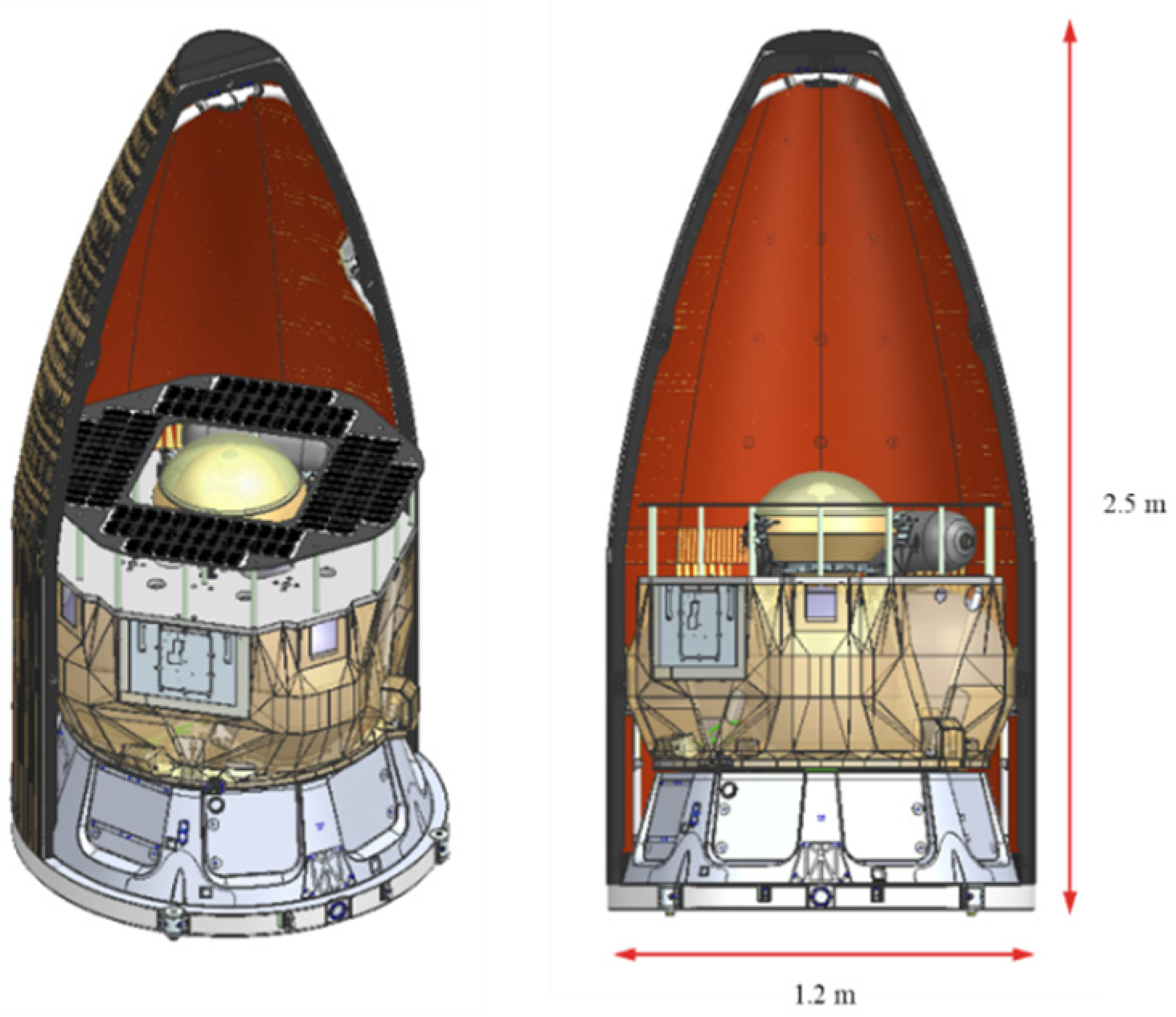
- Interplanetary version of Photon in an Electron fairing
- Manufacturer: Rocket Lab
- Country of origin: United States

Specifications
- Spacecraft type: Satellite bus
- Launch mass: 50 kg (110 lb)
- Payload capacity: 170 kg (370 lb)
- Equipment: S band payloads

Production
- Status: Active
- Launched: 7
- Maiden launch: 31 August 2020; 6 years ago

Related spacecraft
- Derived from: Kick Stage

Photon is a satellite bus based on Rocket Lab's Electron kick stage. It moves satellites into their appropriate orbits once boosted by rockets such as Electron. It is customizable for uses including LEO payload hosting, lunar flybys, and interplanetary missions.

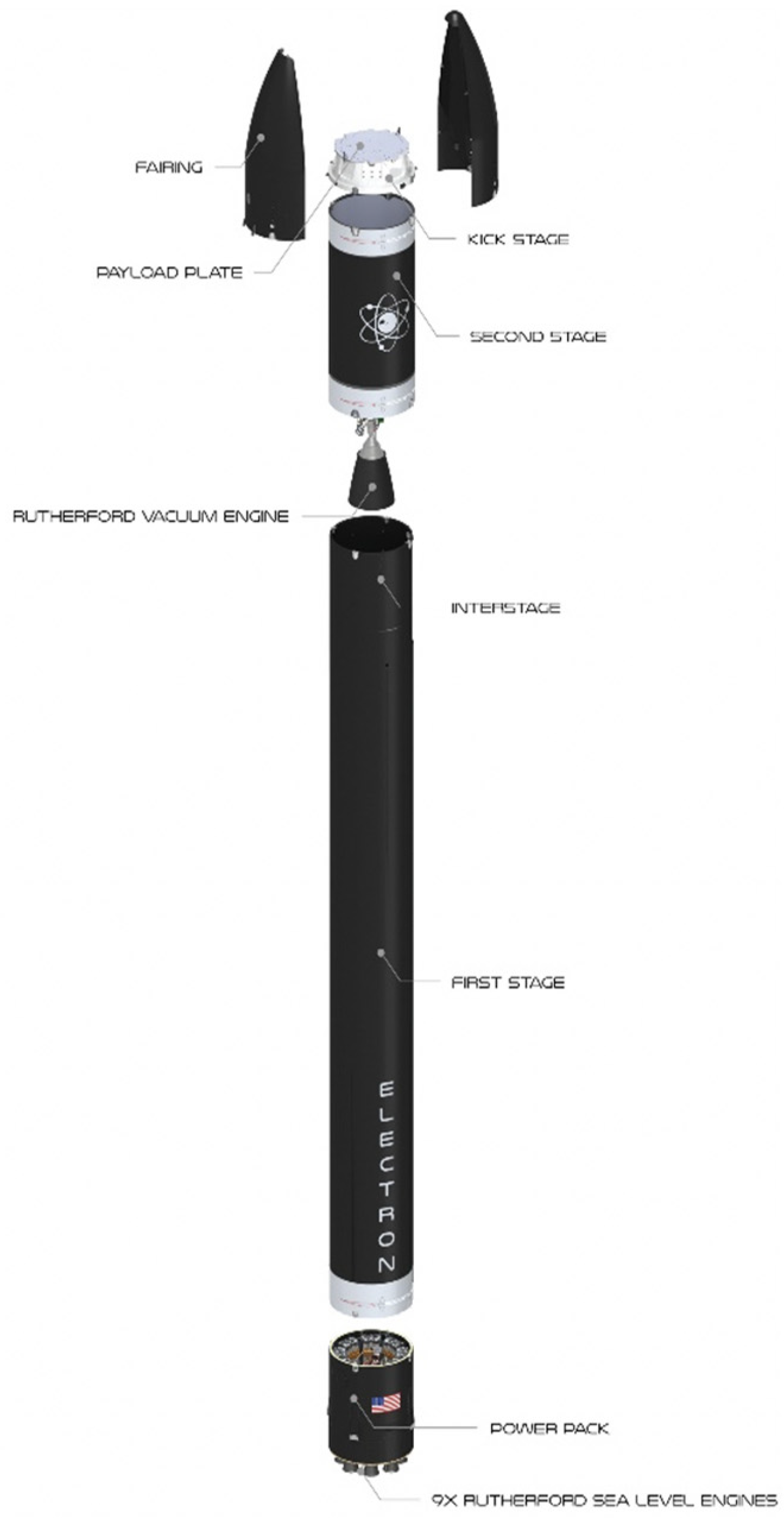
Location of Photon on the Electron rocket

Photon uses chemical propulsion for orbit adjustments. It can use a variety of engines, such as the Curie and HyperCurie engines, as well as engines from third-party sources, such as the one powering the EscaPADE mission.

Photon first launched in August 2020 on Rocket Lab's I Can't Believe It's Not Optical mission, where it served as a pathfinder. It has since flown three times. It flew the CAPSTONE mission.

Photon communicates on the S-band. Depending on the orbital inclination (37° to Sun-synchronous orbit), it is expected to have a payload capacity of 170 kg (370 lb). The interplanetary version was to have a 40 kg (88 lb) payload capacity.

HyperCurie is an evolution of the Curie engine, which comes in monopropellant and bipropellant versions, while the HyperCurie is hypergolic and electrically pumped.

== Development ==
In April 2019, Rocket Lab announced plans to create a new satellite bus, named Photon, to position small satellites into orbit. Its goal was to reduce complexity and development time, enabling technology demonstrations without developing a full spacecraft. The company aimed to broaden its portfolio and diversify its revenue streams. The company announced it was targeting lunar orbit as part of its services, enabled by a bi-propellant propulsion system. The development of Photon included working with potential customers, with significant interest from government agencies. The first few Photon satellites would be technology demonstrators before transitioning to operational launches for customers, which started with NASA's CAPSTONE cubesat in June 2022.

Rocket Lab planned to launch Photon to Venus in December 2025, delivering a laser-tunable mass spectrometer to the Venusian atmosphere.

== Design ==
Photon is manufactured at Rocket Lab's factory in Huntington Beach, California. It can utilize a variety of engines, including those developed by Rocket Lab itself, such as the Curie and HyperCurie engines, as well as engines from third-party sources, such as the one powering the EscaPADE mission. Photon communicates on S-band. Depending on the orbital inclination (37° to Sun-synchronous orbit), it is expected to have a maximum payload capacity of 170 kg (370 lb). The low Earth orbit version of Photon can take 130 kg (290 lb) to Sun-synchronous orbit.

A modified version of Photon has bigger propellant tanks and the HyperCurie engine for interplanetary missions. The interplanetary version has a 40 kg (88 lb) payload capacity. HyperCurie is an evolution of the Curie engine, which comes in a monopropellant version and a bipropellant version, while the HyperCurie is a hypergolic version. HyperCurie is electrically pumped.

== Initial launches ==
The inaugural Photon satellite was the Photon Pathfinder/First Light satellite (COSPAR ID 2020-060A) described by Rocket Lab as its "first in-house designed and built Photon demonstration satellite". It was launched aboard Electron rocket on 31 August 2020 on the 14th Electron mission "I Can't Believe It's Not Optical". First Light had a dual role in the mission: first as the final rocket stage delivering the customer satellite (Capella 2) and then as a standalone satellite undertaking its own orbital mission. The purpose of the First Light standalone mission was to demonstrate the new (as compared to "plain" kick stage) systems for operating in orbit as a long-duration standalone satellite. To demonstrate Photon's payload hosting capabilities, First Light had a low-resolution video camera.

The second formal test, Photon Pathstone, was launched on 22 March 2021 on the 19th Electron mission "They Go Up So Fast". Like First Light, Pathstone first delivered customer satellites to orbit before transitioning into its own satellite operations. Pathstone operations were aimed at building flight heritage and focused on testing systems in preparation for launching NASA's CAPSTONE smallsat mission in June 2022. These tests included power and thermal management, attitude control via reaction wheels and communications systems.

The first operational launch for Photon was NASA's CAPSTONE smallsat mission, utilising the Explorer configuration of the Photon kickstage. Qualification of the Photon kick stage for this mission was underway by December 2020. Photon delivered CAPSTONE on a trans-lunar injection (TLI) burn on 6th day from liftoff after performing 6 apogee raising burns at perigee within every 24 hours from liftoff, leading to TLI and a near-rectilinear halo orbit. After this the CAPSTONE was deployed in its journey to the Moon.

After completing all the mission requirements for NASA, Rocket Lab utilised its Photon spacecraft for a low-altitude lunar flyby.

== Photon versions ==
Due to the high amount of customization Photon can undergo, Rocket Lab decided to rebrand Photon and split it into different spacecraft: Explorer, Lightning, Pioneer, and Photon.

=== Explorer ===
Explorer is a high delta-V spacecraft designed for deep space missions. The first Explorer flew in 2022 and delivered CAPSTONE to a trajectory towards the Moon. Currently, two Explorers have been launched as part of the EscaPADE mission and have been sent to Earth L2 orbit prior to going to Mars when the transfer window opens late 2026. Explorer can be launched on any rocket, depending on the mission profile.

=== Lightning ===
Lightning is designed for LEO constellations and is intended to operate for 12+ years in LEO. It has a 3 kW power delivery system and is suited for high-duty-cycle telecommunications and remote sensing. Lightning currently has no flight heritage, with the first launch planned for 2025. Both the satellites (buses) for Globalstar and the Space Development Agency are based on the Lightning architecture.

=== Pioneer ===
Pioneer is a highly specialized satellite bus designed to support payloads up to 120 kg for special missions, including re-entry and dynamic space operations. Pioneer first took flight in 2023, supporting a mission for Varda Space Industries where the capsule atop the bus grew crystals of the drug ritonavir. After growing the crystals and experiencing some regulatory hold-ups, the spacecraft returned to Earth and landed in Utah.

=== Photon ===
Photon is the upgraded version of Rocket Lab's kick stage. It features power, propulsion, and communications systems for delivering payloads to LEO. The first Photon was launched in 2020, deploying a satellite for Capella Space. After deployment, the Photon spacecraft served as a pathfinder.

== Operational statistics ==
=== Mission outcomes ===
- Mission Failure
- Mission Success
- Mission Ongoing

=== Variations ===
- Photon
- Explorer
- Pioneer
- Scheduled Pioneer
- Scheduled Lightning
- Scheduled Explorer

== Mission history ==
Date/time (UTC)	Launch name	Destination	Photon customer	Launch vehicle	Photon version	Photon engine	Mission outcome
31 August 2020 03:05:4	"I Can't Believe It's Not Optical"	LEO	Rocket Lab	Electron	Photon	Curie	Success
31 August 2020 03:05:4	"I Can't Believe It's Not Optical"	Inaugural launch of the Photon satellite bus. After Photon deployed a 100 kg satellite for Capella Space, Photon served as a Pathfinding mission.					
22 March 2021 22:30	"They Go Up So Fast"	LEO	Rocket Lab	Electron	Photon	Curie	Success
22 March 2021 22:30	"They Go Up So Fast"	The second launch of the Photon satellite bus. "Pathstone" served as a risk reduction demonstration for the CAPSTONE mission which would send a satellite to the moon. It also deployed 7 satellites for BlackSky, Fleet Space, Myriota, Care Weather Technologies, The University of New South Wales’s Canberra Space and U.S. Army’s SMDC.					
28 June 2022 09:55	"CAPSTONE"	TLI	NASA	Electron	Explorer	HyperCurie	Success
28 June 2022 09:55	"CAPSTONE"	Lunar Photon brought the CAPSTONE CubeSat to TLI, CAPSTONE then separated from lunar Photon to get into NRHO around the Moon. The mission served as a pathfinding mission for NASA's upcoming Gateway.					
12 June 2023 20:30	Transporter 8	LEO	Varda Space Industries	Falcon 9	Pioneer	Curie	Success
12 June 2023 20:30	Transporter 8	First launch of four. In orbit, the capsule will grow crystals of the drug called ritonavir. After which, Photon reentered the capsule and separated from the capsule. The capsule then fell down to Earth and landed in Utah, where the drugs will be retrieved. The touchdown happened on 21 February 2024.					
14 January 2025 19:09	Transporter 12	LEO	Varda Space Industries	Falcon 9	Pioneer	Curie	Success
14 January 2025 19:09	Transporter 12	Second of four Photons for Varda Space Industries, designated W-2.					
15 March 2025 06:43	Transporter 13	LEO	Varda Space Industries	Falcon 9	Pioneer	Curie	Success
15 March 2025 06:43	Transporter 13	Third of four Photons for Varda Space Industries, designated W-3.					
13 November 2025 20:55	EscaPADE	Mars	NASA	New Glenn	Explorer	Bipropellant system from Arianespace	
13 November 2025 20:55	EscaPADE	Rocket Lab received a subcontract from the University of California Berkeley Space Sciences Laboratory (UCBSSL) to design two Photon spacecraft for the EscaPADE mission, set to orbit Mars and study its magnetosphere. The mission, part of NASA's SIMPLEx program, will explore Mars' unique magnetosphere and its relationship with the solar wind, shedding light on the planet's historical climate changes.					
19 June 2026 10:19	VICTUS HAZE	LEO	U.S. Space Force	Electron	Pioneer		Success
19 June 2026 10:19	VICTUS HAZE	Rocket Lab built and launched a satellite for TacRS (Tactically Responsive Space). Once on orbit, the spacecraft conducted a variety of dynamic space operations to demonstrate SDA characterization capabilities with True Anomaly’s spacecraft, the Jackal autonomous orbital vehicle. Rocket Lab announced completion of initial Rendezvous and Proximity Operations (RPO) mission objectives on July 7, 2026 with additional months of testing to follow.					

== Upcoming missions ==
Confirmed upcoming missions for Photon and Photon variants.

Date/ time (UTC)	Planned destination	Customer	Launch vehicle	Photon version	Photon Engine
NET 2025	Venus	Rocket Lab	Electron	Explorer	HyperCurie
NET 2025	First privately funded mission to venus. Photon will examine the Venus cloud layer in search for organic compounds. The goal is to send a probe to around 48 km altitude where Venus' atmospheric conditions are closer to those found on Earth.				
NET 2025	LEO	Globalstar	Unknown	Lightning	Unknown
NET 2025	In February 2022, Rocket Lab was awarded a $143 million subcontract by MDA to lead the design and manufacture of 17 spacecraft buses for Globalstar’s new Low Earth Orbit satellites. The launch is planned for no earlier than late 2025.				
NET 2026	LEO	Viasat	Unknown	Lightning	Curie
NET 2026	Spacecraft bus for Viasat. The Rocket Lab spacecraft will provide the power, communications, propulsion, and attitude control for the mission demonstration. Rocket Lab will incorporate its own satellite components and sub-systems into the spacecraft including star trackers, reaction wheels, solar panels, S-band radios, flight software and ground software, and the new L-band radio in development for the future InCommand service.				
NET 2027	LEO	SDA	Unknown	Lightning	Unknown
NET 2027	Rocket Lab was selected by the SDA to design and built 18 Tranche 2 Transport Layer-Beta Data Transport Satellites (T2TL - Beta). The launch is planned no earlier than 2027.				

== See also ==
- Comparison of satellite buses
- PSLV Orbital Experiment Module
