= Rutherford (rocket engine) =

Liquid-fueled rocket engine

- Sea-level Rutherford engine
- Country of origin: United States; New Zealand
- Designer: Rocket Lab
- Manufacturer: Rocket Lab
- Application: First- and second-stage
- Status: Active

Liquid-fuel engine
- Propellant: LOX / RP-1
- Cycle: Electric-pump-fed
- Pumps: 2

Configuration
- Chamber: 1

Performance
- Thrust, vacuum: Original: 24 kN (5,500 lbf); Updated: 26 kN (5,800 lbf)
- Thrust, sea-level: Original: 24 kN (5,500 lbf); Updated: 25 kN (5,600 lbf)
- Thrust-to-weight ratio: 72.8
- Specific impulse, vacuum: 343 s (3.36 km/s)
- Specific impulse, sea-level: 311 s (3.05 km/s)

Dimensions
- Diameter: .25 m (9.8 in)
- Dry mass: 35 kg (77 lb)

Used in
- Electron, HASTE

Rutherford is a liquid-propellant rocket engine designed by aerospace company Rocket Lab and manufactured in Long Beach, California. The engine is used on the company's own rocket, Electron. It uses LOX (liquid oxygen) and RP-1 (refined kerosene) as its propellants and is the first flight-ready engine to use the electric-pump-fed cycle. The rocket uses a cluster of nine identical engines on the first stage, and one vacuum-optimized version with a longer nozzle on the second stage. This arrangement is also known as an octaweb. The sea-level version produces 24.9 kN (5,600 lbf) of thrust and has a specific impulse of 311 s (3.05 km/s), while the vacuum optimized-version produces 25.8 kN (5,800 lbf) of thrust and has a specific impulse of 343 s (3.36 km/s).

The first test-firing took place in 2013. The engine was qualified for flight in March 2016 and had its first flight on 25 May 2017. As of April 2024, the engine has powered 47 Electron flights in total, making the count of flown engines 369, including one engine flown twice.

== Description ==
Rutherford is named after renowned New Zealand-born scientist Ernest Rutherford. It is a small liquid-propellant rocket engine designed to be simple and cheap to produce. It is used as both a first-stage and a second-stage engine, which simplifies logistics and improves economies of scale. To reduce its cost, it uses the electric-pump feed cycle, being the first flight-ready engine of such type. It is fabricated largely by 3D printing, using a method called laser powder bed fusion, and more specifically Direct Metal Laser Solidification (DMLS®). Its combustion chamber, injectors, pumps, and main propellant valves are all 3D-printed.

As with all pump-fed engines, the Rutherford uses a rotodynamic pump to increase the pressure from the tanks to that needed by the combustion chamber. The use of a pump avoids the need for heavy tanks capable of holding high pressures and the high amounts of inert gas needed to keep the tanks pressurized during flight.

The pumps (one for the fuel and one for the oxidizer) in electric-pump feed engines are driven by an electric motor. The Rutherford engine uses dual brushless DC electric motors and a lithium polymer battery. It is claimed that this improves efficiency from the 50% of a typical gas-generator cycle to 95%. However, the battery pack increases the weight of the complete engine and presents an energy conversion issue.

Each engine has two small motors that generate 37 kW (50 hp) while spinning at 40 000 rpm. The first-stage battery, which has to power the pumps of nine engines simultaneously, can provide over 1 MW (1,300 hp) of electric power.

The engine is regeneratively cooled, meaning that before injection some of the cold RP-1 is passed through cooling channels embedded in the combustion chamber and nozzle structure, transferring heat away from them, before finally being injected into the combustion chamber.

== See also ==
- Curie (rocket engine)
- TEPREL
- Merlin (rocket engine family)
