= CAPSTONE =

NASA satellite to test the Lunar Gateway orbit

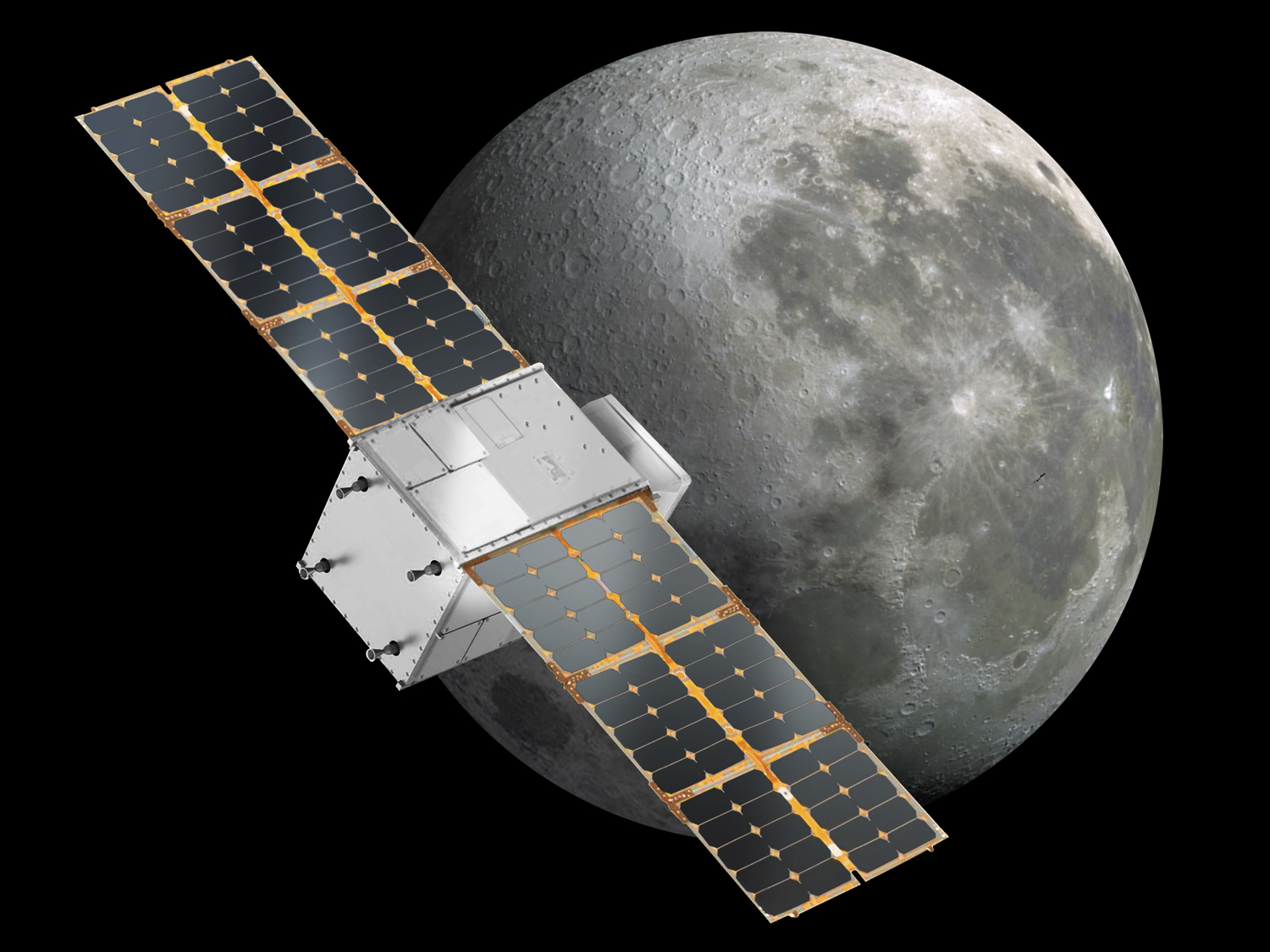
- Illustration of the Cislunar Autonomous Positioning System Technology Operations and Navigation Experiment (CAPSTONE)
- Names: Cislunar Autonomous Positioning System Technology Operations and Navigation Experiment
- Mission type: Technology demonstration
- Operator: Advanced Space
- COSPAR ID: 2022-070A
- SATCAT no.: 52914
- Mission duration: Planned: 10 months Total: 4 years, 4 months, 2 days (elapsed)

Spacecraft properties
- Spacecraft type: 12U CubeSat
- Manufacturer: Advanced Space (management); Tyvak Nano-Satellite Systems (bus); Stellar Exploration, Inc (propulsion)
- Launch mass: 25 kg (55 lb)

Start of mission
- Launch date: 28 June 2022, 09:55 UTC
- Rocket: Electron/Photon HyperCurie
- Launch site: Mahia, LC-1B
- Contractor: Rocket Lab

Moon orbiter
- Orbital insertion: 14 November 2022, 00:38 UTC
- Orbits: Near-rectilinear halo orbit (NRHO)

Orbital parameters
- Periselene altitude: 1,500 km (930 mi)
- Aposelene altitude: 70,000 km (43,000 mi)
- Inclination: Elliptic polar orbit

CAPSTONE also known by its backronym; Cislunar Autonomous Positioning System Technology Operations and Navigation Experiment, is a lunar orbiter that is testing and verifying the calculated orbital stability planned for the now canceled Lunar Gateway space station. The spacecraft is a 12-unit CubeSat that is also testing a navigation system that is measuring its position relative to NASA's Lunar Reconnaissance Orbiter (LRO) without relying on ground stations. It was launched on 28 June 2022, arrived in lunar orbit on 14 November 2022, and was scheduled to orbit for six months. On 18 May 2023, it completed its primary mission to orbit in the near-rectilinear halo orbit for six months, but will stay on this orbit, continuing to perform experiments during an enhanced mission phase. NASA declared its mission complete on 6 July 2026, though Advanced Space will continue operating the spacecraft as a technology testbed.

== Background ==
The Lunar Gateway was an in-development space station being planned by several national space agencies since at least 2018, including NASA, European Space Agency (ESA) and Canadian Space Agency (CSA). The Gateway was planned to be placed in a novel lunar orbit that had never been used until CAPSTONE, where it was expected to serve as a communications hub, science laboratory, short-term habitation module, and holding area for rovers and other robots. Gateway was slated to play a major role in NASA's Artemis program. These plans were canceled in March 2026, when NASA announced it would cancel plans for the station and instead focus developing a lunar surface base between 2029 and 2036.

Computer simulations indicated that this particular orbit—a near-rectilinear halo orbit (NRHO)—offers long-term stability with low propellant requirements for orbital station-keeping, by using a precise balance point in the gravities of Earth and the Moon that offers a stable trajectory.

The main objective of the CAPSTONE mission is to verify the theoretical orbital stability simulations for the Gateway with an actual spacecraft. CAPSTONE is the first spacecraft to operate in an NRHO. The spacecraft is also testing a navigation system called Cislunar Autonomous Positioning System (CAPS), which measures its position relative to NASA's Lunar Reconnaissance Orbiter (LRO) without relying on ground stations.

== Spacecraft ==
The orbiter is a 12-unit CubeSat. The US$13.7 million contract was awarded to a private company called Advanced Space, Boulder, Colorado, on 13 September 2019 through a federal Small Business Innovation Research (SBIR) contract. Advanced Space handled overall project management and some of the spacecraft's key technologies, including its CAPS positioning navigation system, while Tyvak Nano-Satellite Systems, Irvine, California, developed and built the spacecraft bus, and Stellar Exploration, Inc developed its propulsion systems that used Hydrazine.

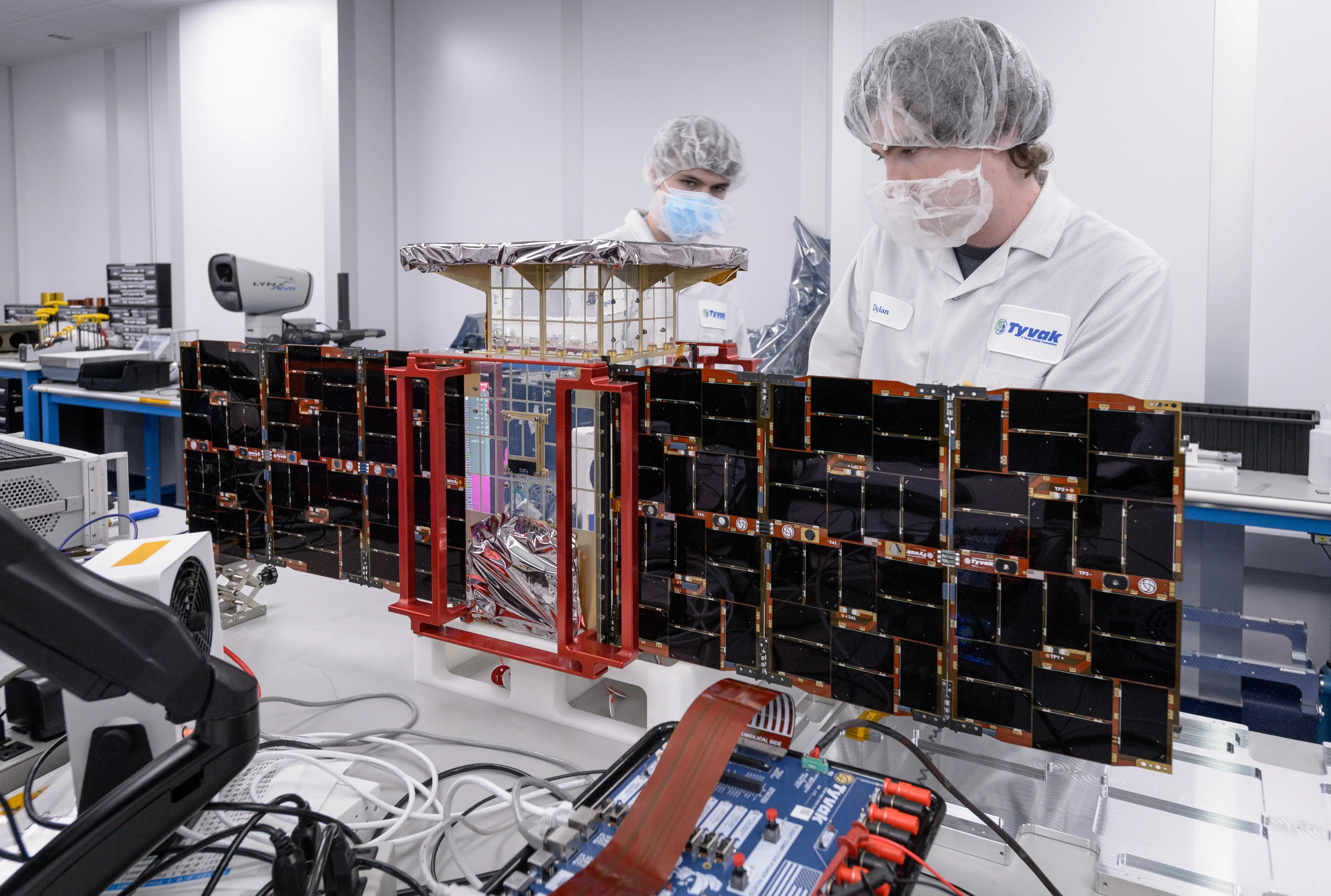
Tyvak engineers install solar panels onto the CAPSTONE spacecraft at Tyvak Nano-Satellite Systems, Inc., in Irvine, California.

== Launch ==
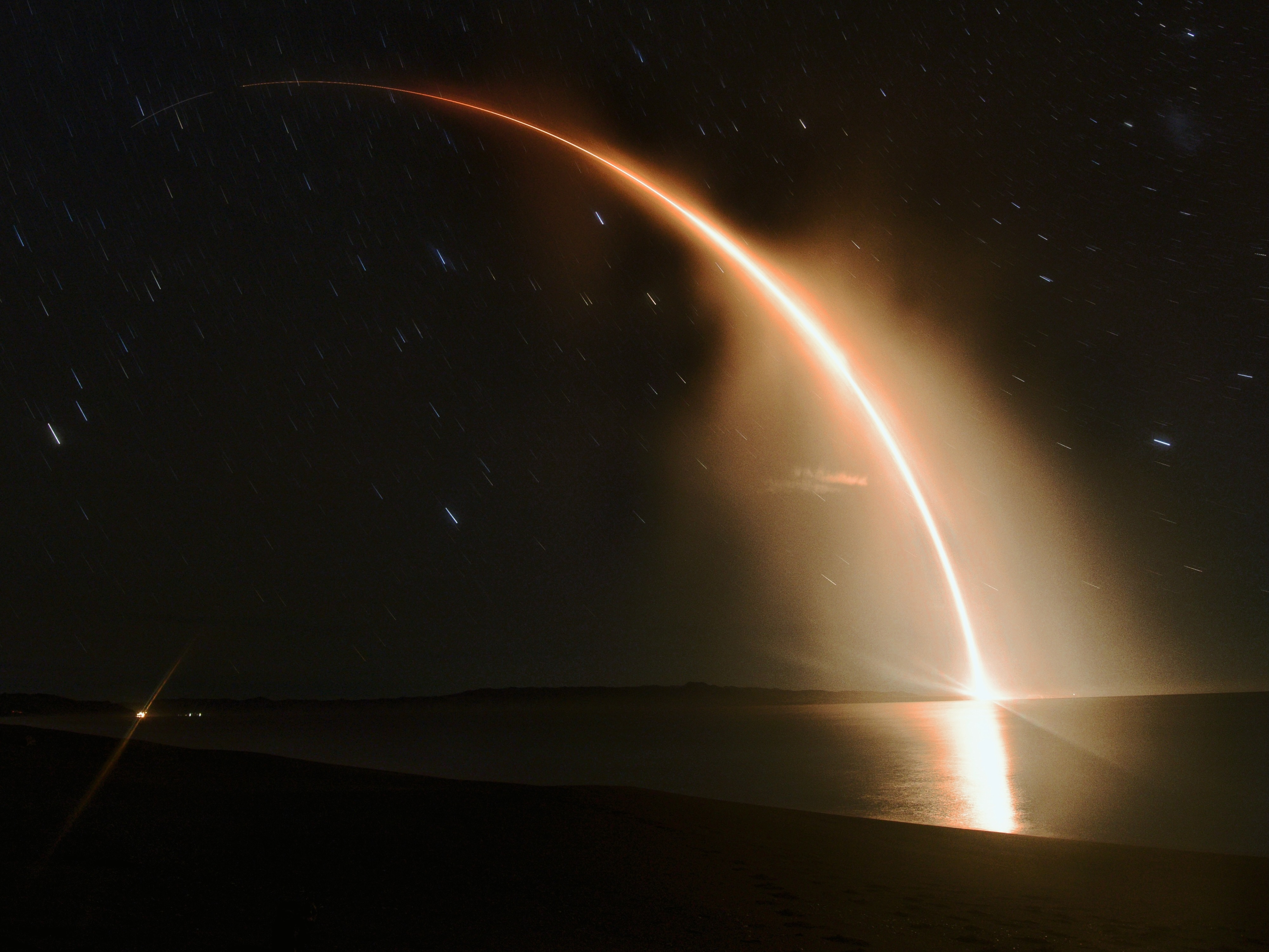
The Electron rocket carrying CAPSTONE seen lifting off from Rocket Lab's Launch Complex in Mahia, New Zealand

CAPSTONE Launch to the Moon
- NASA broadcast (YouTube)

NASA announced on 14 February 2020 that CAPSTONE would be launched aboard a Rocket Lab Electron booster from the company's new launch site at the Mid-Atlantic Regional Spaceport (MARS), Wallops Island, in Virginia. The launch was scheduled for October 2021 but was subsequently delayed and moved to launch from Mahia, LC-1 in New Zealand. The launch contract with Rocket Lab has a value of US$9.95 million, according to NASA.

Rocket Lab's new launch pad in Virginia, designated Launch Complex 2, was completed in 2019 and was hoped to be ready to support launches by 2021. The company said the new facility would principally support Electron missions with U.S. government payloads. However, certification of the Autonomous Flight Termination System (AFTS) took longer than anticipated, resulting in the launch site being changed to Mahia.

CAPSTONE launched on 28 June 2022. After separating from the second stage, the Rocket Lab's Photon kick stage lifted the orbital apogee into a lunar-transfer orbit over six days by firing the HyperCurie bipropellant engine at perigee six times followed by the trans-lunar injection (TLI) burn, after which the CAPSTONE spacecraft was deployed on its journey to the Moon.

On 5 July 2022, NASA lost contact with the spacecraft shortly after separation from Photon and stated their intention to recover two-way communication with the spacecraft and continue the mission. On 6 July, mission operators re-established contact with the spacecraft. By 30 September, CAPSTONE was "power positive" and on a stable trajectory towards the Moon while the mission operators worked to regain orientation control of the spacecraft. The root cause of the problem was narrowed to a valve on a thruster that is probably partially open, which thus produces thrust whenever the propulsion system is pressurized. On 7 October, the team uploaded recovery commands, stopped the spin, and regained full 3-axis attitude control. It remained on track to insert into its targeted orbit.

== Ballistic lunar transfer ==
CAPSTONE used a ballistic transfer to the Moon instead of a more conventional direct Hohmann transfer. While trajectories of this type take much longer to reach their destination (about four months in this case, compared to about three days using a traditional direct transfer) they significantly reduce the propulsion requirements, which can increase the delivered mass (about 10–15% more mass). After being ejected from Earth orbit by a series of burns of the Photon stage, the spacecraft reached a distance of about 1.5 million kilometers, where perturbations from the Sun became important. It then fell back towards the Earth, intercepting the Moon's orbit and finally entering NRHO around the Moon on 14 November 2022.

== Mission ==
Following a three-month trip to the Moon after launch, the CAPSTONE lunar satellite spent six months collecting data during this demonstration, flying within 1,000 mi (1,600 km) of the Moon's North Pole on its near pass and 43,500 mi (70,000 km) from the South Pole at its farthest.

Animation of CAPSTONE

Around the Earth

Around the Moon – Frame rotating with Moon – Front view

Around the Moon – Frame rotating with Moon – Side view

Earth · CAPSTONE · Moon

On 7 February 2025, NASA extended its partnership with Advanced Space through December 2025 for the CAPSTONE mission. Following the successful demonstration of the CAPS navigation system and characterization of a near rectilinear halo orbit around the Moon, the extended mission will further test and refine CAPS using communications with NASA’s Lunar Reconnaissance Orbiter and Deep Space Network. The mission will also support Artemis and Gateway planning through operational analyses and, in collaboration with NASA’s Goddard Space Flight Center, demonstrate autonomous and interoperable communications technologies for the cislunar environment.

== Follow-up mission ==
A second mission called CAPSTONE 2 is scheduled for launch no earlier than 2027.

== See also ==
- Artemis program
- List of missions to the Moon
- Lunar Gateway
- CAPSTONE 2
