= Electric-pump-fed engine =

Rocket engine operation method

Electric-feed rocket cycle. The oxidizer and fuel are fed to the pump which increases the pressure before injecting it into the combustion chamber. The pumps are actuated by an electric motor powered by batteries. An inverter converts the batteries' DC electricity to the AC needed by the motor. The fuel is also circulated around the outside of the combustion chamber and nozzle to prevent it from overheating.

The electric-pump-fed engine is a bipropellant rocket engine in which the fuel pumps are electrically powered, and so all of the input propellant is directly burned in the main combustion chamber, and none is diverted to drive the pumps. This differs from traditional rocket engine designs, in which the pumps are driven by a portion of the input propellants or their combustion product.

An electric cycle engine uses electric pumps to pressurize the propellants from a low-pressure fuel tank to high-pressure combustion chamber levels, generally from 0.2 to 0.3 MPa (29 to 44 psi) to 10 to 20 MPa (1,500 to 2,900 psi). The pumps are powered by an electric motor, with electricity from a battery bank.

Electrical pumps had been used in the secondary propulsion system of the Agena upper stage vehicle.

On 21 January 2018, Electron was the first electric pump-fed rocket to reach orbit. As of December 2020, the only rocket engines to use electric propellant pump systems are the Rutherford engine, ten of which power the Electron rocket, and the Delphin engine, five of which power the first stage of Astra Space's Rocket 3.

In comparison to turbo-pumped rocket cycles such as staged combustion and gas generator, an electric cycle engine has potentially worse performance due to the added mass of batteries, but may have lower development and manufacturing costs due its mechanical simplicity, lack of high temperature turbomachinery, and easier controllability.

== See also ==
- Combustion tap-off cycle
- Expander cycle
- Gas-generator cycle
- Pressure-fed engine
- Rocket engine
- Solid-propellant rocket
- Staged combustion cycle
