= Tian-Long =

Tian-Long, Tian Long, Tianlong, may refer to:

== People and characters ==
- Zhang Tianlong (born 1992), Chinese soccer player
- Yin Tianlong, Chinese soccer player; see List of Chinese football transfers winter 2019
- Wu Tianlong, Chinese soccer player; see List of Chinese football transfers summer 2021
- Teng Tian Long, a competitor on 2015 China's Next Top Model season 5
- Lu Tian-Long, Chinese air force officer, who was part of the order of battle for Battle of South Guangxi
- Hángzhōu Tiānlóng (Kōshū Tenryū), Chinese Zen monk, master of Zen master Juzhi Yizhi (Gutei Isshi)
- Duan Tianlong (段天郎), who discovered the Bingtang orange in Changqi, Hongjiang, Huaihua, Hunan, China

=== Characters ===
- Tianlong (simplified Chinese: 天龙; traditional Chinese: 天龍; pinyin: tiānlóng; Wade–Giles: t'ien lung; lit. 'Heavenly Dragon'), a Chinese mythological heavenly dragon
- Tianlong (天聾), a mythological character, the attendant to the Daoist deity Wenchang Wang
- Tianlong Babu, a mythological character, the bodhisattva form of White Dragon Horse
- Tianlong, a fictional character, a Shaolin monk in the 1984 Hong Kong film Kids From Shaolin
- Witch God Tianlong, a fictional character from the animated TV show Balala the Fairies
- Tian Long, a fictional character from the 2010 animated TV show Astro Plan
- Tianlong Shangren (天龍上人), a fictional character from Heavenly Mountain (Tianshan) novel series; see List of Qijian Xia Tianshan characters
- Wan Tian Long (萬天龍), a fictional character from the Taiwanese TV show Love Family (TV series)
- Feng Tianlong (冯天隆), a fictional character from Leave No Soul Behind 21; an award nominated role for the 2023 Star Awards for Best Actor

== Places ==
- Tianlong Constellation, the Chinese equivalent of the constellation Draco, as a Chinese Dragon

=== Settlements and jurisdictions ===
- Tianlong Town (天龙镇), Pingba, Anshun, Guizhou, China
- Tianlong Tunbao town (Tianlong Fortress-town), Guizhou, China
- Tianlong Village (天龙村), Taohong, Longhui, Hunan, China
- Tianlong Village (天龙村), Wushi, Xiangtan, Hunan, China
- Tianlong Village (天龙村), Longkou, Xiangtan, Xiangtan, Hunan, China
- Tianlong Village (天垅村), Fenshui Township, Hunan, China; in Xiangtan County
- Tianlong Village, Luyuan, Yanling, Hunan, China
- Tianlong County (天龍國), Taiwan; a nickname for Taipei; see North–South divide in Taiwan

=== Geographic and geologic features ===
- Tianlong Bridge, Three Natural Bridges, Xiannüshan Town, Wulong District, Chongqing Municipality, Sichuan Province, China; a natural limestone arch
- Tianlong Lake, Xiayi County, Shangqiu, Henan, China; see Li (surname 栗)
- Tianlong Mountain, Taiyuan, Shanxi, China; see Tianlongshan Grottoes
- Tianlong Mountain, Sanzao Township, Jingzhou County, Jiangzhou, China; see Qu River (Yuan River tributary)

=== Facilities and structures ===
- Tianlong Hotel, Nanan, Chongqing, Sichuan, China
- Tianlong Railway (Tianshui–Longnan Railway), China
- Tianlong Road, Yubei District, Chongqing Municipality, China; see Min'an Avenue station
- Tianlongsi station (Tianglong Temple station), Nanjing Metro, Nanjing, Jiangsu, China
- Chongsheng Temple (Yunnan), China; also known as Tianlong Temple (Tianlongg Si)
- Tian Long Temple (Tian Leong Temple), Sin Ming, Bishan, Singapore
- Tianlong Suspension Bridge, Haiduan, Taitung County, Taiwan

=== Fictional locations ===
- Tian Long Temple, a fictional location from the anime-manga Hero Tales

== Vehicular and transportation ==
- Dongfeng Tianlong, a Chinese truck; see Saipa Diesel

=== Ships ===
- Tian Long, a ferry operated by the Macao Dragon Company
- Tian Long, a Sierra Leone flagged cargo ship that was beached in 2022; see List of shipwrecks in 2022
- Tian Long He (Tian Long Ship), a Chinese container ship; see COSCO fleet lists

=== Space rockets ===
- Tianlong series of space rockets from Space Pioneer
  - Tianlong-1
  - Tianlong-2
  - Tianlong-3

=== Missiles ===
- Tian Long (Sky Dragon) surface-to-air (SAM) missile, a series of Chinese SAM systems developed by Norinco:
  - TL-6 (Sky Dragon 6), a variant of the TY-90 air defense missile
  - TL-12 (Sky Dragon 12), a system similar to the 2K22 Tunguska
  - Sky Dragon 30, a variant of the PL-15 missile
  - Sky Dragon 50, a variant of the DK-10 surface-to-air missile
- Tian Long (Sky Dragon) anti-ship/land attack missile, a series of Chinese missiles developed by Hongdu:
  - TL-6 (Sky Dragon 6), a Hongdu anti-ship missile
  - TL-7 (Sky Dragon 7), a Hongdu anti-ship missile
  - TL-10 (Sky Dragon 10), a Hongdu anti-ship missile
  - TL-7 (Sky Dragon 17), a Hongdu anti-ship missile
  - TL-30 (Sky Dragon 30), a Hongdu anti-radiation missile

== Other uses ==
- Guilin Tianlong, a Chinese soccer team that competed in the 2014, 2015, 2016 Chinese FA Cup

== See also ==
- Longtian (disambiguation)
- Long (disambiguation)
- Tian (disambiguation)
- TL (disambiguation)
- Tian Long Ba Bu (disambiguation)
