= Sky Dragon (disambiguation) =

Sky Dragon is a 1949 Charlie Chan mystery film.

Sky Dragon or Sky Dragons may also refer to:

== Military ==
- Sky Dragon surface-to-air (SAM) missile, a series of Chinese SAM systems developed by Norinco:
  - Tianlong 6 (Sky Dragon 6), a variant of the TY-90
  - Sky Dragon 12, a system similar to the 2K22 Tunguska
  - Sky Dragon 30, a variant of the PL-15
  - Sky Dragon 50, a system designed to fire DK-10 missiles
- Sky Dragon anti-ship/land attack missile, a series of Chinese missiles developed by Hongdu
  - TL-6 (Sky Dragon 6)
  - TL-7 (Sky Dragon 7)
  - TL-10 (Sky Dragon 10)
  - TL-7 (Sky Dragon 17)
  - TL-30 (Sky Dragon 30)

== Other uses ==
- Sky Dragons, a 2012 Dragonriders of Pern novel by Anne McCaffrey and Todd McCaffrey
- Stephen Tse, head of the Boston-based Ping On crime syndicate also known as Sky Dragon

== See also ==
- Dragons of the Highlord Skies, a 2007 fantasy novel by Margaret Weis and Tracy Hickman
- Sky Dragon of Osiris, one of the three Egyptian God cards in Japanese manga series Yu-Gi-Oh!
- Chhota Bheem And The Sky Dragon, an Indian animated film in the Chhota Bheem series
