= Tianlong-3 =

Orbital launch vehicle by Space Pioneer

- Function: Orbital launch vehicle
- Manufacturer: Space Pioneer
- Country of origin: China

Size
- Height: 71 m (233 ft)
- Diameter: 3.8 m (12 ft)
- Mass: 590 t (1,300,000 lb)
- Stages: 2

Capacity

Payload to Low Earth orbit (LEO)
- Mass: 17 t (37,000 lb)

Payload to Sun-synchronous orbit (SSO)
- Mass: 14 t (31,000 lb)

Launch history
- Status: Active
- Launch sites: Jiuquan; Wenchang Commercial LC-2
- Total launches: 1
- Failure: 1
- First flight: 3 April 2026

First stage
- Powered by: 9 x TH-12
- Maximum thrust: 8.0 MN (820 t_{f}; 1,800,000 lbf)
- Propellant: LOX / RP-1

Second stage
- Powered by: 1 x TH-12 Vac
- Maximum thrust: 1,350 kN (138 t_{f}; 300,000 lbf)
- Propellant: LOX / RP-1

Tianlong-3 (Chinese: 天龙三号; pinyin: Tiānlóng sān hào; lit. 'Heavenly Dragon 3', TL-3) is a medium-lift orbital launch vehicle developed by the Chinese private aerospace manufacturer Space Pioneer. It is designed to be partially reusable, with the first stage capable of performing an autonomous vertical landing and being reused up to 10 times. Tianlong-3 is part of Space Pioneer's efforts to develop low-cost, reusable launch vehicles to compete in the growing commercial launch market. It aims to provide launch services for medium-sized payloads to low Earth orbit (LEO) and sun-synchronous orbit (SSO).

== Design ==
=== First stage ===
The first stage of the Tianlong-3 is equipped with 9 Tianhuo-12 (TH-12) liquid oxygen/kerosene engines. Each engine has a vacuum thrust of 1,350 kN, a vacuum specific impulse of 335 s, a sea-level thrust of 1,090 kN, a sea-level specific impulse of 285 s, a throttling range of 40%~110%, and a thrust-to-weight ratio of 163. The engines utilize a gas generator cycle and feature pump-fed gimbaling.

The first stage propellant tanks have a diameter of 3.8 meters and use the same triangular grid-stiffened shell structure as the 3.35-meter-diameter tanks of the Tianlong-2 first stage.

=== Second stage ===
The second stage of the Tianlong-3 is equipped with a single vacuum-optimized version of the Tianhuo-12 engine, designated as TH-12V.

=== Payload fairing ===
The standard payload fairing of the Tianlong-3 has a diameter of 4.2 m, a height of 12 m, and can accommodate payloads with a diameter of up to 3.8 m and a height of up to 10 m. An enhanced version of the fairing, with a diameter of 5.2 m and a height of 14 m, is also available.

=== Orbital insertion accuracy ===
The Tianlong-3 is designed to achieve high orbital insertion accuracy, with a semi-major axis deviation of ≤ 5 km, an orbital inclination deviation of ≤ 0.07°, an eccentricity deviation of ≤ 0.003, an attitude angle deviation of ≤ 0.5°, and an attitude angular velocity deviation of ≤ 0.5°/s.

== Development history ==
=== Tianhuo-12 engine ===
On July 24, 2023, the Tianhuo-12 (TH-12) engine, designed for the Tianlong-3 rocket, successfully completed a full-duration hot fire test. The test utilized an engine in the flight configuration of the first Tianlong-3 rocket and was conducted at rated conditions for a single burn duration of 100 seconds, accumulating a total test duration of 200 seconds. This test demonstrated that the engine met the flight requirements for the Tianlong-3 rocket.

In early January 2024, the TH-12 engine completed a calibration hot fire test for the first flight batch. The test, conducted using an engine in the flight configuration of the first Tianlong-3 rocket, subjected the engine to a 50-second process verification test at rated conditions. During the test, the engine demonstrated rapid startup, smooth operation, and normal shutdown.

Later in January 2024, the TH-12 engine underwent a spot check hot fire test for the first flight batch, fully simulating the flight conditions of the inaugural Tianlong-3 launch. The test involved 6 consecutive ignitions of the engine without removal from the test stand, accumulating a total test duration exceeding 1,000 seconds. Notably, the single engine operating time during the test surpassed the planned flight duration by a factor of 6.

=== Accidental launch during static fire test ===
On June 30, 2024, a Tianlong-3 first stage detached from its stand during a static fire test due to a structural failure, resulting in an unintentional liftoff. The errant stage crashed and exploded in the mountains 1.5 kilometres (0.9 mi) southwest of the test stand at the Gongyi Engine Test Facility, and no casualties were reported. The test stand was 5 kilometres (3.1 mi) from the centre of Gongyi, a city of 800.000 inhabitants, and less than 1 kilometre (0.6 mi) from a smaller village.

A patent issued in 2023 for the test stand, previously used for Tianlong-2, describes a maximum load-bearing capacity of 600 tonnes-force (5.9 MN; 1,300,000 lbf). Space Pioneer stated that the nine-engine first stage had reached a thrust of 820 tonnes-force (8.0 MN; 1,800,000 lbf) prior to failure with 200 tonnes (440,000 lb) of fuel remaining, suggesting the partially-fueled first stage's net thrust may have exceeded the test stand's designed capacity.

Rocket & Serial	Flight No.	Date (UTC)	Payload	Orbit	Launch site	Outcome	Notes
Tianlong-3 first stage	N/A	June 30, 2024	N/A	N/A	Gongyi Engine Test Facility	Unintentional Launch	Planned static fire test with a duration of 30 seconds, vehicle broke free from the test stand after ignition.

== Flight history ==
=== Maiden flight ===
The booster completed a successful static fire test on September 15, 2025.

The maiden flight of the Tianlong-3 rocket launched from Jiuquan Satellite Launch Center on April 3, 2026, but suffered an anomaly shortly after takeoff. Although the first stage of the rocket is designed for reusability, it was not planned to be recovered during this inaugural launch.

=== List of launches ===
Flight No.	Rocket & Serial No.	Date (UTC)	Payload	Orbit	Launch site	Outcome	Booster recovery	Notes
1	Tianlong-3 Y1	3 April 2026; 04:17:00	Demo Flight	SSO	Jiuquan	Failure	Not attempted	
2	Tianlong-3 Y2	TBD	Various	SSO	Wenchang Commercial, LC-2	Planned	TBD	
3	Tianlong-3 Y3	TBD	Various	SSO	Wenchang Commercial, LC-2	Planned	TBD	

== See also ==
- Comparison of orbital launcher families
- Comparison of orbital launch systems
- Expendable launch system
- Lists of rockets
