= COSCO fleet lists =

Fleet of the Chinese shipping company

COSCO operates one of the largest civil fleets in the world, consisting of 1,114 ships as of 2017.

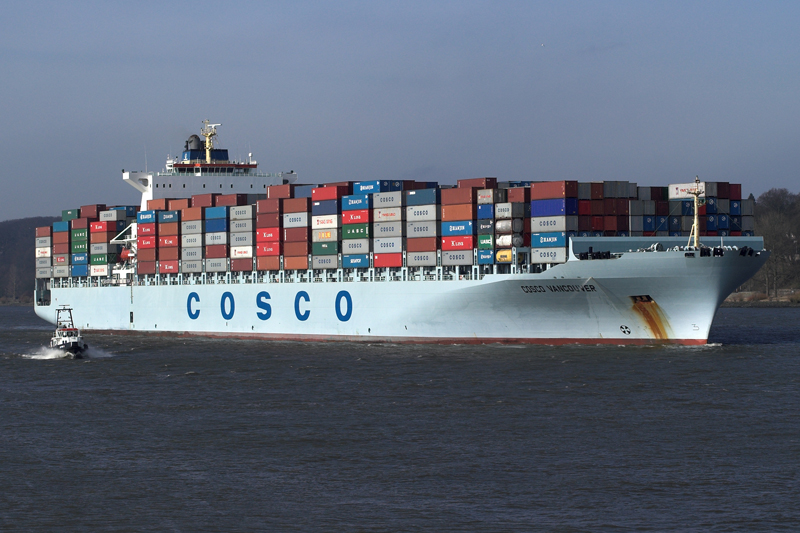
Cosco Vancouver

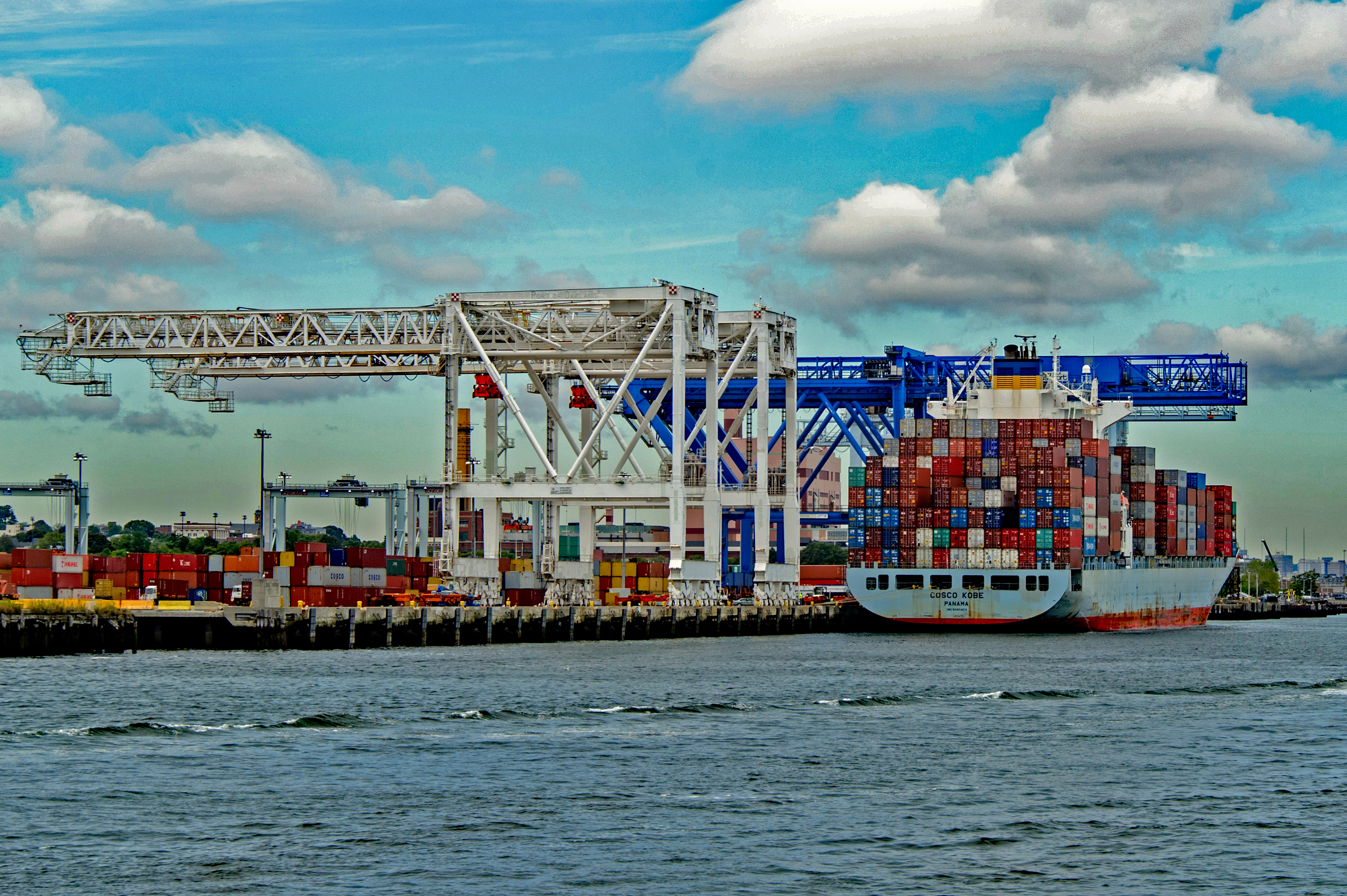
COSCO Kobe at Conley Terminal, Boston

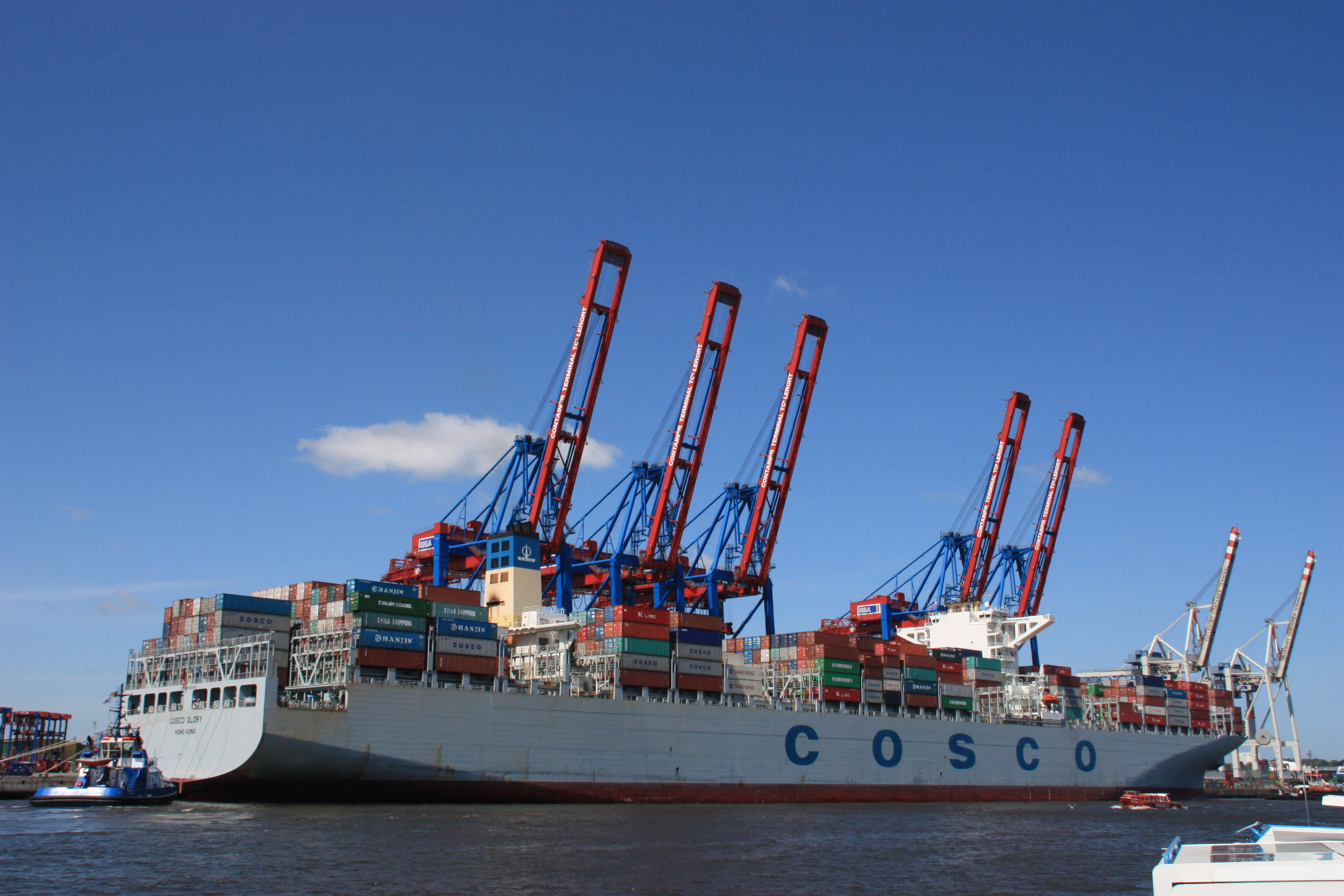
COSCO Glory in port at Hamburg

== Container ships ==
Operated by COSCO SHIPPING Lines Co., Ltd.

=== Post-Panamax ===
Ship	Built	DWT	TEU	Flag	IMO	Notes
Chuan He	1997	69,285	5,446	China	9120798	
Jin He	1997	69,283	5,446	Panama	9120786	Scrapped in 2017
Lu He	1997	69,285	5,446	Panama	9120748	Scrapped in 2017.
Wan He	1997	69,285	5,446	Panama	9120774	Scrapped in 2017.
Yue He	1997	69,285	5,446	Panama	9120750	
COSCO Qingdao	1997	69,285	5,446	China	9120762	
COSCO Busan	2001	68,086	5,446	Hong Kong	9231743	Involved in the San Francisco oil spill. Scrapped in 2017.
COSCO Antwerp	2001	68,901	5,446	United Kingdom	9246396	
COSCO Hamburg	2001	69,193	5,446	United Kingdom	9221085	
COSCO Shanghai	2001	69,192	5,446	United Kingdom	9221097	
COSCO Singapore	2001	69,196	5,446	United Kingdom	9221102	
COSCO Felixstowe	2002	69,107	5,446	United Kingdom	9246401	
COSCO Hongkong	2002	69,207	5,446	United Kingdom	9227778	
COSCO Rotterdam	2002	69,224	5,446	United Kingdom	9221073	
OOCL Ningbo	2004	195,372	8,063	Hong Kong	9256482	
COSCO Long Beach	2004	93,572	7,455	Liberia	9285677	Ex E.R. Shenzen
COSCO Seattle	2004	93,726	7,455	Liberia	9285689	Ex E.R. Seattle
COSCO Shenzen	2004	93,643	7,455	Liberia	9285653	Ex E.R. Montecito
COSCO Vancouver	2004	93,638	7,455	Liberia	9285691	Ex E.R. Vancouver
COSCO Yokohama	2004	93,659	7,455	Liberia	9285665	Ex E.R. Yokohama
COSCO China	2005	101,570	8,204	Liberia	9305465	Ex E.R. Tianan
COSCO Germany	2005	101,532	8,204	Liberia	9305477	Ex E.R. Tianshan
COSCO Napoli	2005	101,491	8,204	Liberia	9305489	Ex E.R. Tianping
COSCO Dalian	2005	67,209	5,816	Panama	9300312	
COSCO Tianjin	2005	67,209	5,816	Panama	9300324	Scrapped in 2017.
COSCO Xiamen	2005	67,209	5,816	Panama	9300300	
COSCO Beijing	2006	107,504	9469	Malta	9308508	
COSCO Guangzhou	2006	109,498	9469	Malta	9305570	
COSCO Hellas	2006	107,149	9469	Greece	9308510	
COSCO Ningbo	2006	107,492	9469	Malta	9305582	
COSCO Yantian	2006	107,498	9469	Malta	9305594	
COSCO Boston	2007	68,240	5,089	Panama	9335173	
COSCO New York	2007	68,234	5,089	Panama	9335185	
COSCO Asia	2007	109,968	10,062	Panama	9345403	
COSCO America	2008	109,950	10,062	Panama	9345439	
COSCO Europe	2008	109,968	10,062	Panama	9345415	
COSCO Kaohsiung	2008	111,414	10,020	Hong Kong	9355563	
COSCO Oceania	2008	111,385	10,020	Hong Kong	9334923	
COSCO Pacific	2008	111,315	10,020	Hong Kong	9355551	
COSCO Taicang	2009	111,499	10,020	Hong Kong	9355575	
COSCO Africa	2009	114,394	10,062	Panama	9345439	
COSCO Fukuyama	2009	50,622	4,506	Panama	9400306	
COSCO Kawasaki	2009	50,713	4,506	Panama	9459632	
COSCO Kobe	2009	50,681	4,506	Panama	9380403	
COSCO Nagoya	2009	50,687	4,506	Panama	9380271	
COSCO Osaka	2009	50,712	4,506	Panama	9400291	
Tian An He	2010	63,165	5,089	China	9400564	
Tian Fu He	2010	63,143	5,089	China	9437567	
Tian Kang He	2010	63,296	5,089	China	9400576	
Tian Jin He	2010	63,187	5,089	China	9437531	
Tian Li He	2010	63,253	5,089	China	9400552	
Tian Long He	2010	63,195	5,089	China	9400538	
Tian Qing He	2010	63,259	5,089	China	9437555	
Tian Sheng He	2010	63,292	5,089	China	9437543	
Tian Xiu He	2010	63,188	5,089	China	9400540	
Tian Bao He	2010	62,997	5,089	China	9390616	
Tian Xing He	2010	63,001	5,089	China	9400526	
Tian Yun He	2010	63,142	5,089	China	9400514	
COSCO Indonesia	2010	101,200	8,501	Hong Kong	9448786	
COSCO Japan	2010	102,834	8,501	Hong Kong	9448748	
COSCO Korea	2010	102,710	8,501	Hong Kong	9448750	
COSCO Malaysia	2010	102,834	8,501	Hong Kong	9448774	
COSCO Philippines	2010	101,200	8,501	Hong Kong	9448762	
COSCO Thailand	2010	101,200	8,501	Hong Kong	9448798	
COSCO Prince Rupert	2011	102,742	8,501	Hong Kong	9448803	
COSCO Vietnam	2011	102,875	8,501	Hong Kong	9448815	
COSCO Development	2011	140,609	13,114	Hong Kong	9472139	
COSCO Glory	2011	141,823	13,114	Hong Kong	9466245	
COSCO Harmony	2011	140,453	13,114	Hong Kong	9472177	
COSCO Pride	2011	140,665	13,114	Hong Kong	9472153	
COSCO Hope	2012	140,241	13,114	Hong Kong	9472165	
COSCO Excellence	2012	140,146	13,114	Hong Kong	9472189	
COSCO Failth	2012	140,609	13,114	Hong Kong	9472141	
COSCO Fortune	2012	140,637	13,114	Hong Kong	9472127	
COSCO Belgium	2013	156,605	13,386	Hong Kong	9516404	
COSCO France	2013	156,596	13,386	Hong Kong	9516416	
COSCO England	2013	156,700	13,386	Hong Kong	9516428	
COSCO Netherlands	2013	156,549	13,386	Hong Kong	9516430	
COSCO Italy	2014	157,000	13,386	Hong Kong	9516454	
COSCO Spain	2014	156,760	13,386	Hong Kong	9516466	
COSCO Portugal	2014	156,700	13,386	Hong Kong	9516442	
COSCO Denmark	2014	156694	13,386	Hong Kong	9516478	
COSCO Shipping Danube	2016	110,500	9,092	Hong Kong	9731913	
COSCO Shipping Panama	2016	117,366	9,400	Marshall Islands	9732606	Ex Andronikos. First ship through new Panama Canal
COSCO Shipping Volga	2017	111,244	9,092	Hong Kong	9731925	
COSCO Shipping Thames	2017	110,500	9,092	Hong Kong	9731937	
COSCO Shipping Seine	2017	111,401	9,092	Hong Kong	9731949	
COSCO Shipping Rhine	2017	110,000	9,092	Hong Kong	9731951	
COSCO Shipping Himalayas	2017	153,500	14,500	Hong Kong	9757840	

=== Panamax ===
Ship	Built	DWT	TEU	Flag	IMO	Notes
COSCO Shekou	1986	43,567	3,265	Panama	8511299	
COSCO Lianyungang	1986	43,657	3,265	Cyprus	8511304	
COSCO Chiwan	1986	43,567	3,265	Panama	8511316	
COSCO Norfolk	1993	43,025	3,330	Cyprus	9064841	
Empress Heaven	1993	47,994	3,494	Panama	9041227	Scrapped in 2013
Empress Dragon	1994	47,998	3,494	Panama	9046112	Scrapped in 2013
Empress Phoenix	1994	48,020	3,494	Panama	9041239	Scrapped in 2013
Empress Sea	1994	47,969	3,494	Panama	9046124	Scrapped in 2013
Da He	1994	51,946	4,221	China	9043639	
Shan He	1994	51,982	4,221	China	9043641	
Zhen He	1994	51,981	4,221	China	9043627	
Fei He	1994	51,280	4,221	China	9060182	
Teng He	1994	51,280	4,221	China	9067570	
Yuan He	1994	51,280	4,221	China	9067568	
Zhong He	1994	51,609	4,221	China	9067556	
River Elegance	1994	49,945	4,196	Panama	9072147	
River Wisdom	1994	49,995	4,196	Panama	9072135	
Bu Yi He	1997	44,911	3400	Panama	9139000	
Ha Ni He	1997	44,911	3400	Panama	9139012	
Jing Po He	1997	44,911	3400	Panama	9139036	
Luo Ba He	1997	44,911	3400	Panama	9139062	Scrapped in 2017.
Na Xi He	1997	44,911	3400	Panama	9139024	
Xi Bo He	1997	44,911	3400	Panama	9139048	
Yu Gu He	1997	44,722	3400	Panama	9139050	
HS Berlioz	2007	46,287	3,586	Liberia	9315343	
HS Bizet	2007	46,311	3,586	Liberia	9315355	
COSCO Yingkou	2007	41,500	3,534	Hong Kong	9403011	
COSCO Fuzhou	2007	42,201	3,534	Hong Kong	9403009	
JPO Tucana	2010	52,788	4,178	Liberia	9400198	
Aglaia	2011	52,788	4,178	Liberia	9400215	
COSCO Aukland	2012	52,000	4,253	Hong Kong	9484261	
COSCO Colombo	2012	49,971	4,253	Hong Kong	9484285	
COSCO Durban	2012	52,006	4,253	Hong Kong	9484297	
COSCO Fos	2012	49,954	4,253	Hong Kong	9484302	
COSCO Genoa	2012	49,944	4,253	Hong Kong	9484326	
COSCO Haifa	2012	49,949	4,253	Hong Kong	9484338	
COSCO Houston	2012	49,921	4,253	Hong Kong	9484273	
COSCO Istanbul	2012	49,945	4,253	Hong Kong	9484340	
COSCO Jeddah	2012	49,948	4,253	Hong Kong	9484352	
COSCO Aden	2012	49,963	4,253	Hong Kong	9484003	
COSCO Surabaya	2013	49,961	4,256	Hong Kong	9518347	
COSCO Aqaba	2013	49,963	4,256	Hong Kong	9518359	
COSCO Piraeus	2013	49,997	4,253	Hong Kong	9484364	
COSCO Santos	2013	49,959	4,253	Hong Kong	9484376	
COSCO Sao Paulo	2013	49,962	4,253	Hong Kong	9484388	
COSCO Valencia	2013	49,985	4,256	Hong Kong	9484390	
COSCO Venice	2013	49,973	4,256	Hong Kong	9484405	
COSCO Wellington	2013	49,959	4,256	Hong Kong	9484417	
COSCO Izmir	2013	49,952	4,256	Hong Kong	9484508	
COSCO Ashdod	2013	49,956	4,256	Hong Kong	9518335	

=== Sub-Panamax ===
Ship	Built	DWT	TEU	Flag	IMO	Notes
Tai He	1989	45,987	2,716	China	8705230	
Min He	1989	47,625	2,761	China	8806096	
Dong He	1990	47,625	2,761	China	8806101	
Gao He	1990	47,625	2,761	China	8818740	
Pu He	1990	45,990	2,716	China	8705242	
E.R. Perth	1998	35,798	2,811	Panama	9152868	
Sils	2003	39,425	2,824	Panama	9253002	
COSCO Sydney	2004	37,978	2.702	Germany	9305001	
COSCO Brisbane	2005	38,121	2.702	Liberia	9312432	
COSCO Karachi	2005	38,104	2.702	Germany	9305013	
COSCO Panama	2005	38,117	2.702	Liberia	9305013	
COSCO Melbourne	2005	37,883	2,741	Liberia	9308390	
COSCO Dammam	2005	38,822	2,741	Marshall Islands	9308405	

=== Handysize ===
Ship	Built	DWT	TEU	Flag	IMO	Notes
Sha He	1983	26,025	1,234	China	8108808	
Jing Cheng He	1983	26,025	1,234	Liberia	8108810	
Sky River	1984	36,021	1,960	Liberia	8320793	
Xin Chun He	1984	25,545	1,322	China	8321709	Ex Chun He
Xin Qiu He	1984	25,808	1,322	China	8318001	
Xin Yin He	1984	25,925	1,328	China	8318037	
Xin Xing He	1985	25,925	1,328	China	8318049	
Xin Chao He	1985	25,545	1,322	China	8321711	Ex Chao He
Bing He	1985	33,370	1.696	China	8318051	
Xiang He	1985	30,940	1.696	China	8318013	
Zhuang He	1985	33,240	1.696	China	8321723	
Yu He	1988	30,845	1.696	China	8318025	
Song He	1986	33,265	1,699	China	8514590	
Dainty River	1993	33,577	1,932	Panama	9043017	
Pretty River	1993	33,548	1,932	Panama	9043005	
Steindeich	1996	18,323	1,203	China	9113458	
Prosper	1996	22,148	1,504	Liberia	9117181	
Bavaria	1996	18,335	1,203	Antigua and Barbuda	9113446	
Hansa Greifswald	1996	12,713	1,016	Malta	9118501	
Helene J	1997	26,260	1,900	Antigua and Barbuda	9138238	
Klaus J	1997	26,260	1,900	Antigua and Barbuda	9138240	
Feng Yun He	1998	24,251	1,432	Panama	9228758	
Song Yun He	1998	24,237	1,432	Panama	9160700	
Bai Yun He	1999	25,656	1,702	Panama	9203473	
Hong Yun He	1999	26,027	1,702	China	9203461	
Rui Yun He	1999	25,648	1,702	China	9220433	
Xiang Yun He	2000	25,648	1,702	Malta	9223746	
Cai Yun He	2000	24,259	1,432	Panama	9228758	
Jin Yun He	2000	24,244	1,432	Panama	9228746	
Fei Yun He	2000	25,648	1,702	China	9223760	
Ling Yun He	2000	25,723	1,702	China	9223772	
Hua Yun He	2000	25,850	1,702	China	9214525	
Qing Yun He	2000	25,645	1,702	China	9214513	
Teng Yun He	2000	25,648	1,702	China	9223758	
Mi Yun He	2001	24,259	1,432	Panama	9228772	
Qi Yun He	2001	24,261	1,432	Panama	9228760	
Hansa Augustenburg	2003	23,606	1,740	Liberia	9155391	

=== Other ===
Ship	Built	DWT	TEU	Flag	IMO	Notes
Hai Sheng Long	1982	10,475	584	China	8208892	
Bai An 2	1982		478	Panama		
Bai An 12	1982		478	Panama		
Star River	1982	9,609	494	Panama	8015570	
Precious River	1982	14,033	969	Panama	8128860	
Noble River	1983	13,996	969	Panama	8128872	
Han Jiang He	1984	7,000	422	China	8321826	
Han Zhong He	1984	9,509	422	China	8321838	
Shang Cheng	1984	13,449	724	China	8306735	
Gao Cheng	1984	14,132	724	China	8306747	
Ming Cheng	1985	13,449	724	China	8306761	
Bin Cheng	1985	13,508	724	China	8306773	
Han Shui He	1985	9,464	422	China	8321840	
Han Tao He	1985	9,485	422	China	8321852	
Sea Dragon	1985	7,795	424	Panama	8321955	
Huai Ji He	1985	7,785	424	China	8321979	
Song Cheng	1987	12,300	724	China	8306785	
Norfolk	1989	3,016	265	Panama	8910938	
Hong Tai 28	1992	12,000	633	China	9049164	
Long He	1994	13,278	725	China	9058397	
Sheng He	1994	13,250	725	China	9058402	
Pan He	1995	13,275	725	China	9118109	Scrapped in 2013
Xiao Yun	1995	4,340	327	China	9141601	
Yan He	1996	13,275	725	China	9118111	
Da Qing He	1996	12,570	764	Panama	9122617	
Hu Tuo He	1996	12,687	764	Panama	9122643	Scrapped in 2015
Yong Ding He	1996	12,668	764	Panama	9122631	Scrapped in 2015
Zi Ya He	1996	12,570	764	Panama	9122629	
Chao Shan He	1996	15.920	836	Panama	9146699	
Xin Hui He	1996	15.673	836	Panama	9141182	Scrapped in 2015
Zhao Qing He	1996	15.919	836	Panama	9146687	Scrapped in 2015
Yang Jiang He	1997	15.418	836	Panama	9146704	Scrapped in 2015
Bo Run	1997		750	Panama		
Bo Feng	1997		750	Panama		
Matsuko	1999	9,509	564	Panama	9184196	
Takeko	1999	9,513	564	Panama	9184201	
Umeko	1999	9,515	564	Panama	9184213	
COSCO Ran	2001	9,290	542	Panama	9247869	Ex River Nereides. Scrapped in 2017.
COSCO Sakuru	2001	9,287	542	Panama	9247857	Ex River Aquamarine. Scrapped in 2017
COSCO Kiku	2002	9,290	542	Panama	9247871	
Hong Tai 2	2005		408	China		
Hong Kong Hong 21	2006		369	China		
Li Feng Nan Hai	2006	10,900	650	China	9377080	
Li Feng Dong Hai	2006	10,900	650	China	9377353	
Bei Hai	2006	7,900	602	China	9397597	
Contship Eco	2008	9,907	750	Liberia	9492751	
Hua Dong 88	2008		665	China		
Chang Sheng Ji 2	2010		629	China		
Hong Tai 22	2010		720	China		
Xin Hong Xiang 89	2010		720	China		
Hong Tai 26	2010		720	China		
Xin Hong Xiang 76	2010		686	China		
Chang Sheng Ji 5	2011		872	China		

== Bulk carriers ==
Operated by COSCO Bulk Shipping (Group) Co., Ltd.

=== Capesize ===
Ship	Built	DWT	Flag	IMO	Notes
Dong Feng Ocean	1986	214,861	Panama	8414520	Ex Exxon Valdez. Scrapped in 2012
CHS Star	1991	150,149	Panama	8907905	
Sea Grace	1994	157,600	Panama	9057020	
Sea Gloria	1994	157,600	Panama	9057032	
Tian Fu Hai	1998	149,135	China	9158800	
Tian Li Hai	1999	148,726	China	9158812	
Tian Rong Hai	2000	171,861	Panama	9203112	
Tian Shun Hai	2000	171,861	Panama	9203124	
Tian Bao Hai	2004	174,766	China	9309019	
Tian Lu Hai	2005	174,398	China	9298480	
CHS World	2006	174,232	Hong Kong	9369851	
CHS Creation	2006	174,110	Hong Kong	9348273	
CHS Cosmos	2006	174,091	Hong Kong	9377937	
CHS Harvest	2006	173,624	Hong Kong	9307061	
CHS Magnificence	2006	173,541	Hong Kong	9307073	
CHS Splendor	2006	170,000	Hong Kong	9281700	
COSCO Ansteel	2009	297,719	Hong Kong	9377391	
Yuan Wang Hai	2011	207,916	Panama	9516519	

=== Panamax ===
Ship	Built	DWT	Flag	IMO	Notes
Kang Su Hai	1975	64,444	China	7374010	
Sea Radiance	1977	71,730	Hong Kong		
Ya Zhou Hai	1977	66,383	China	7533082	
Peng Yan	1981	60,050	China	8020563	
Peng Shen	1982	69,203	China	8202082	
Peng Feng	1983	65,029	China	8025458	
Yi Jia	1986	67,396	China	8510037	Scrapped in 2014
Bright City	1988	68,200	Hong Kong	8715302	
Mass Wits	1988	69,355	Panama	8512889	
Peng Zhong	1989	68,676	China	8912637	Scrapped in 2017.
Peng Ye	1989	68,676	China	8801773	
Peng Wei	1990	68,676	China	8806890	
Alescaballo	1990	70,402	Panama	8903301	
Aleslevada	1990	70,231	Panama	8903313	
Sea Magnolia	1990	62,873	Panama	8807210	
Joy Sea	1990	66,214	Panama	8916736	
Beauty Sea	1991	62,592	Panama	8903349	
Scenery Sea	1991	69,358	Panama	8903351	
Sea Ilex	1991	62,873	Panama	8807208	
Bao Shan Hai	1991	64,909	China	8919594	
Li Shan Hai	1991	65,029	China	8919609	
Mass Prosperity	1993	69,555	Panama	9050321	
Mass Merit	1993	69,620	Panama	9050319	Scrapped in 2013
Mass Enterprise	1993	69,555	Panama	9046904	
Mass Glory	1993	69,555	Panama	9046916	
Full Spring	1994	69,587	Hong Kong	9064451	
Full Sources	1994	69,573	Hong Kong	9064449	
Full Beauty	1994	70,198	Hong Kong	9074080	
Full Comfort	1994	70,181	Hong Kong	9065390	
Full Strong	1994	70,171	Hong Kong	9065388	
Feng Shan Hai	1994	69,930	China	9055993	
Gao Zhou Hai	1994	69,967	China	9055967	
Joyous Age	1994	69,271	Hong Kong	9047099	
Joyous Land	1994	69,283	Hong Kong	9047104	
Joyous Society	1994	69,274	Hong Kong	9050254	
Joyous World	1995	69,286	Hong Kong	9050266	
Deng Zhou Hai	1995	69,952	China	9055979	
Fu Zhou Hai	1995	69,967	China	9055981	
De Zhou Hai	1995	69,968	China	9056911	
Zheng Xing Hai	1995	66,133	China	9056014	
Fen Jin Hai	1995	69,973	China	9056923	Scrapped in 2014
Teng Fei Hai	1995	69,967	China	9056935	
Shekou Sea	1996	72,394	Hong Kong	9138927	
Jin Pu Hai	1996	69,902	Panama	9156125	
Fu Kang	1997	72,437	Panama	9154127	
Fu Ming	1997	69,163	Panama	9159189	
Fu Hua	1997	72,437	Panama	9154103	Scrapped in 2017.
Fu Man	1997	72,369	Panama	9162045	
Fu Da	1997	72,330	Hong Kong	9162057	
Fu Le	1998	72,332	Hong Kong	9164316	
Fu Tong	1998	72,330	Hong Kong	9161261	
Heng Shan Hai	1998	72,769	China	9160281	
Hua Shan Hai	1998	72,769	China	9160293	
Song Shan Hai	1998	73,605	China	9160243	Scrapped in 2014
Huang Shan Hai	1998	73,596	China	9160255	Scrapped in 2014
Yong Feng	2000	74,837	Hong Kong	9216418	
Yong Huan	2000	74,823	Hong Kong	9236169	
Yong Jia	2001	74,870	Hong Kong	9236183	
Yong Li	2001	74,382	Hong Kong	9228007	
Yong Tong	2001	74,382	Hong Kong	9228019	
Yong Tai	2001	74,061	Hong Kong	9216420	
Cos Intrepid	2001	74,119	Hong Kong	9216432	Scrapped in 2017.
Cos Joy	2001	74,119	Hong Kong	9216444	
De Ping Hai	2002	74,819	China	9262352	
Ju Da	2005	73,603	Liberia	9300116	
Hai Huang Xing	2005	73,581	China	9300128	
Yuan Zhi Hai	2005	74,272	China	9295191	
Yuan Hui Hai	2006	74,259	China	9295189	

=== Handysize ===
Ship	Built	DWT	Flag	IMO	Notes
Liu Lin Hai	1971	38,745	China	7110402	First ship from the PRC to visit the USA
Jing Hong Hai	1976	29,324	China	7402104	
Zhao Yang Hai	1977	30,917	China	7413749	
Xue Hai	1977	46,585	China	7525451	
Lepinghai	1980	26,789	China		
Tong Hai	1981	25,667	China	8132005	
Dong Fang Hai	1982	37,636	China	8103298	
Joviality	1982	45,564	Hong Kong	8106434	
Festivity	1982	45,548	Panama	8103468	
Luckyfield	1982	45,546	Panama	8103456	
Peng He	1982	45,561	China	8103444	Scrapped in 2013
Peng Fa	1982	42,949	China	8029416	Scrapped in 2013
Yick Lee	1982	39,925	Panama	8025525	
Yick Shun	1982	39,818	Panama	8025537	Scrapped in 2013
Yick Luck	1982	42,925	Panama	8029430	Scrapped in 2013
Yick Wing	1982	42,943	Panama	8029428	
Yick Zao	1983	39,805	Panama	8216837	
Tong Shan Hai	1983	34,991	China	8025551	
Jin Shan Hai	1983	34,971	China	8025549	
Tuo Hai	1983	46,455	China	8220216	
Peng Xiang	1983	39,850	China	8028620	Scrapped in 2013
Sea Brilliance	1984	38,309	Hong Kong	8307167	
Sea Crown	1984	43,304	Panama	8309452	Scrapped in 2013
Sea Swift	1984	37,026	Panama	8300511	
Sea Sparkle	1984	38,380	Hong Kong	8307208	
Sea Rainbow	1984	38,309	Hong Kong	8307179	
Man Hai	1984	46,436	China	8220228	
Yi Hai	1984	46,455	China		
Fu Ning Hai	1984	46,550	China	8301371	
Shen Quan Hai	1984	46,518	China	8301383	
Hua Wang Hai	1984	45,260	Panama		
Hua Xing Hai	1984	45,090	Panama		
Yick Hua	1984	28,086	Panama	8312136	
Shou Chang Hai	1984	45,149	China	8316508	Scrapped in 2013
Tai Bai Hai	1984	37,544	China	8318269	
Tai He Hai	1985	37,544	China	8318271	
Tai Cang Hai	1985	37,544	China	8318283	
Tai Kang Hai	1985	37,544	China	8318295	
Tai Gu Hai	1985	37,393	China	8318300	
Sea Angel	1985	39,340	Hong Kong	8309361	
Sea Mild	1985	38,888	Panama	8309012	
Sea Flourish	1985	38,888	Hong Kong	8308991	
Qing Ping	1985	37,746	Liberia	8308915	
Hill Harmony	1985	24,682	Liberia	8402058	
Hill Plenty	1985	24,708	Liberia	8402060	
Shou Ning Hai	1985	45,130	China	8316510	
Shou Guang Hai	1985	45,123	China	8412053	
Peng Qing	1985	40,473	China	8309373	
Peng Jie	1985	39,924	China	8319500	Scrapped in 2015
Peng Wen	1985	39,940	China	8319512	
Peng Cai	1985	46,056	China	8408533	Scrapped in 2015
Sea Emerald	1985	26,596	Hong Kong	8507341	
Tian Shan Hai	1985	45,884	China	8406444	
Tian Tan Hai	1985	45,884	China	8406432	
Meng Hai	1985	46,566	China	8324191	
Tai An Hai	1986	47,665	China	8318312	
Tai Shan Hai	1987	47,665	China	8318324	
Peng Xin	1990	41,869	China	8912596	
You Ya	1990	27,879	Panama	8914714	
You Xuan	1990	43,697	Panama	8912625	
You Liang	1991	42,066	Panama	8913198	
You Mei	1991	42,035	Panama	8913203	
Tai Hua Hai	1991	47,377	China	8919556	
Tai Shun Hai	1991	47,378	China	8919568	
You Yue	1992	26,796	Hong Kong	9034626	
Zhong Hai	1993	45,189	Panama	9117715	
Grand Way	1994	44,006	Hong Kong	9077264	Scrapped in 2013
Grand View	1994	43,980	Hong Kong	9077252	
Full City	1995	26,758	Panama	9073672	Involved in the island of Såstein oil spill.
Full Rich	1995	43,217	Hong Kong	9074066	
Full Wealth	1995	43,202	Hong Kong	9074054	
Qin Hai	1995	45,569	Panama	9110274	
Nan Hai	1995	45,189	Panama	9117703	
Bei Hai	1995	45,178	Panama	9117698	
Ming Hai	1996	45,593	Panama	9109914	
Han Hai	1996	45,644	Panama	9110286	
Yue Hai	1996	45,632	Panama	9109926	
Cos Bonny	1996	46.864	Singapore	9117399	Scrapped in 2017.
Cos Cherry	1996	46.846	Singapore	9117404	Scrapped in 2017.
Jian Qiang	1996	46.807	Panama	9123623	
Gang Qiang	1997	46.790	Panama	9123635	Scrapped in 2017.
Sea Baisi	1997	26,637	Panama	9125803	
Sea Bailsen	1997	27,000	Panama		
Xi Chang Hai	1997	28,544	Panama	9127942	
Rui Chang Hai	1997	27,288	Panama	9127954	
Xu Chang Hai	1997	27,110	Panama	9158379	
Dong Chang Hai	1997	27,137	Panama	9158381	
Yi Chang Hai	1997	26,748	Panama	9158393	
Sea Bailo	1998	26,611	Panama	9134036	
Gao Qiang	1998	45,769	Hong Kong	9154579	
Hua Qiang	1998	45,768	Hong Kong	9144495	
Chang Qiang	1998	45,759	Hong Kong	9144524	
Xin Qiang	1998	45,732	Hong Kong	9144500	
Sheng Qiang	1998	45,706	Hong Kong	9144536	
Zhi Qiang	1998	45,704	Hong Kong	9144483	Scrapped in 2017.
Jin Qiang	1998	47,324	Panama	9154579	Scrapped in 2017.
Tu Qiang	1998	47,324	Panama	9154581	
Jia Qiang	1998	47,324	Panama	9154593	
Lu Hai	1998	46,702	Panama	9159452	
Li Hai	1998	46,672	Panama	9159464	
Song Hai	1998	47,077	China	9155327	
Shan Hai	1998	47,077	China	9155339	Scrapped in 2017.
Yang Hai	1998	47,077	China	9162447	Scrapped in 2017.
Wu Chang Hai	1998	27,635	China	9160267	
Nan Chang Hai	1998	27,635	China	9160279	
Tong Hai	1999	47,980	Panama	9166302	
Feng Hai	1999	47,980	Panama	9209192	
Cos Fair	1999	46,864	Panama	9168881	Scrapped in 2017.
Cos Glory	1999	46,680	Panama	9168893	
Lianhuahai	2000	47,980	Panama	9209207	
Dingxianghai	2000	47,787	Panama	9209219	
Kang Chang	2002	52,828	Hong Kong	9238193	Scrapped in 2017.
Kang Qiang	2002	51.069	Hong Kong	9236834	
Kang Long	2002	52,825	Hong Kong	9240835	
Kang Sheng	2002	52,828	Hong Kong	9238208	Scrapped in 2017.
Kang Fu	2002	51,069	Hong Kong	9236822	
Kang Yuan	2002	50,467	Hong Kong	9264453	
Kang Zhong	2002	50,508	Hong Kong	9264441	Scrapped in 2017.
Kang Xing	2002	50,467	Hong Kong		
Dayahai	2002	50,465	China	9251872	
Dapenghai	2002	50,457	China	9251860	Scrapped in 2017.
Cos Knight	2002	52,353	Panama	9253480	
Cos Lucky	2003	52,395	Panama	9253492	
Kang Yu	2004	52,898	Hong Kong	9278765	
Sea Lantana	2004	52,471	Hong Kong	9287156	
Sea Lily	2004	52,471	Hong Kong	9287144	
Yuanping Sea	2004	55,646	Panama	9282390	
Kang Hong	2005	55,589	Hong Kong	9323558	
Cos Orchid	2006	55,539	Singapore	9308704	
Cos Prosperity	2006	55,676	Singapore	9308716	
Pu Tuo Hai	2007	53,393	China	9466518	

== Tankers ==
Operated by Dalian Ocean Shipping Company.

=== VLCC ===
Ship	Built	DWT	Flag	IMO	Notes
Cosgreat Lake	2002	298,833	Panama	9263215	
Cosglory Lake	2003	299,145	Panama	9245782	
Cosbright Lake	2003	299,079	Panama	9263227	
Yuan Sheng Hu	2006	299,145	Panama		
Cosgrand Lake	2006	298,997	Panama	9294575	
Cosgrace Lake	2006	298,118	Panama	9294587	
Cosmerry Lake	2006	298,920	Panama	9325037	
Cospearl Lake	2008	299,118	Hong Kong	9337171	
Cosjade Lake	2009	298,216	Hong Kong	9337183	
Yuan Yang Hu	2010	297,305	China	9398943	
Yuan Shan Hu	2010	297,136	China	9417189	
Shinyo Saowalak	2010	296,988	Hong Kong	9515929	
Shinyo Kieran	2011	297,066	Hong Kong	9515931	
Cosgold Lake	2011	297,163	Hong Kong	9585194	
Cosglad Lake	2011	297,388	Hong Kong	9591284	
Cosrich Lake	2012	297,336	Hong Kong	9646986	
Hong Kong Spirit	2013	318,473	Hong Kong	9602289	
Yuan Chun Hu	2014	308,013	China	9681209	
Yuan Yue Hu	2015	308,079	China	9681211	
Yuan Qiu Hu	2015	308,371	China	9723590	
Cosflying Lake	2015	309,436	Hong Kong	9698771	
Cosdignity Lake	2015	308,000	Hong Kong	9727209	
Coswisdom Lake	2016	308,019	Hong Kong	9727194	
Cosrising Lake	2016	310,595	Hong Kong	9735737	
Coslucky Lake	2017	309,000	Hong Kong	9791236	

=== Suezmax ===
Ship	Built	DWT	Flag	IMO	Notes
Da Ming Hu	2003	159,149	China	9259721	
Da Yuan Hu	2004	159,149	China	9259733	
Da Li Hu	2004	159,149	China	9259745	

=== Aframax ===
Ship	Built	DWT	Flag	IMO	Notes
Yang Ning Hu	2009	109,815	China	9397755	
Yang Mei Hu	2010	109,855	China	9417165	
Yang Li Hu	2010	109,892	China	9417177	

=== Panamax ===
Ship	Built	DWT	Flag	IMO	Notes
Kun Ming Hu	1982	60,585	China	8013558	
Po Yang Hu	1994	61,957	China	9063108	
Dong Ting Hu	1995	62,217	China	9063110	
Ai Ding Hu	1999	66,094	China	9214642	
Ji Li Hu	2000	66,094	China	9214654	
Xuan Wu Hu	2000	68,429	China	9215127	
Ban Gong Hu	2000	68,404	China	9215139	
Lian Ping Hu	2005	71,940	China	9308962	
Lian An Hu	2005	71,962	China	9308974	
Lian Shun Hu	2005	71,956	China	9308986	
Lian Yun Hu	2006	75,943	China	9344813	
Lian Xiang Hu	2006	75,504	China	9344825	
Lian Sheng Hu	2006	75,499	China	9344837	
Lian Huan Hu	2017	50,239	Hong Kong	9747089	
Lian Xi Hu	2017	50,000	Hong Kong	9747106	
Lian Le Hu	2017	50,000	Hong Kong	9747118	

=== Handysize ===
Ship	Built	DWT	Flag	IMO	Notes
Yang Chen Hu	1982	19,989	China	8108896	
Yan Shui Hu	1995	43,928	China	9038646	
Ming Ze Hu	1995	43,928	China	9059573	
Ying Song Hu	1995	43,929	China	9059585	

=== LPG carrier ===
Ship	Built	DWT	Flag	IMO	Notes
Yuan Xiang	1980	3,996	China	8021878	sold to Thais
Yuan Ji	1980	2,552	China	8021880	sold to Thais
Ju Yuan	1984	3,000	China	8322002	
Zhu Yuan	1992	3,422	China	9014779	scrapped 2014
Fu Rong Yuan	1996	2,854	China	9136747	
Bai Hua Yuan	1997	3,338	China	9166936	
Tong De Yuan	2007	2,706	China	9491446	
Tong Xin Yuan	2008	2,736	China	9515814	

=== LNG carrier ===
Ship	Built	DWT	Flag	IMO	Notes
Dapeng Sun	2008	83.050	Hong Kong	9308479	
Dapeng Moon	2008	83.645	Hong Kong	9308481	
Dapeng Star	2009	82,248	Hong Kong	9369473	
Min Rong	2009	82,359	Hong Kong	9305116	
Min Lu	2009	82,598	Hong Kong	9305128	
Shen Hai	2012	82,625	Hong Kong	9583677	

== General cargo ==
Ship	Built	DWT	Flag	IMO	Notes
Da Tian	1974	14,515	China	7371991	
Jin Cheng	1975	18,755	China	7374242	
Xian Cheng	1976	18,466	China	7374254	
Ju Yong Guan	1976	17,401	China	7525956	
Shan Hai Guan	1976	17,325	China	7525968	
Dan Yang	1977	13,640	China	7733876	
Pu Cheng	1977	16,070	China	7610115	
Xuan Cheng	1977	15,112	China	7616274	
Jiao Cheng	1978	16,250	China	7638741	
Shui Cheng	1978	13,720	China	7735056	
An Dong Jiang	1979	15,160	China	7614719	
An Shan	1981	15,265	China	7826518	
Lu Shan	1982	15,635	China	8026658	
Hua Shan	1982	15,361	China	8030128	
Huang Shan	1982	15,630	China	8024571	
Chi Yun	1983	7,278	China	8318362	
Cheng Yun	1983	7,137	China	8318374	
Huang Yun	1984	7,137	China	8318386	
Heng Shan	1984	16,670	China	8225357	
Liang Shan	1984	16,670	China	8225345	
Song Shan	1984	16,670	China	8225369	
Woodlink	1984	30,881	Panama	8313398	
Bao Jiang	1984	5,082	China	8315865	
Dau Jiang	1984	5,082	China	8315877	
Jiang Ning Guan	1984	5,593	China	8400842	
Jiang Pu Guan	1984	5,687	China	8400854	
Jiang Xi Guan	1985	5,593	China	8400866	
Tao Jiang	1985	15,510	China	8302856	
Bi Jiang	1985	15,400	China	8400414	
Jia Yin Guan	1985	7,165	China	8401042	
Jia Shan Guan	1985	7,1495	China	8401030	
Jia He Guan	1985	7,110	China	8401028	
Jin Niu Ling	1992	28,470	Panama	9060209	
Yong Sheng	2002	19,150	Hong Kong	9243813	

== Specialised vessels ==
Operated by COSCO SHIPPING Specialized Carriers Co. Ltd

=== Semi-submersibles ===
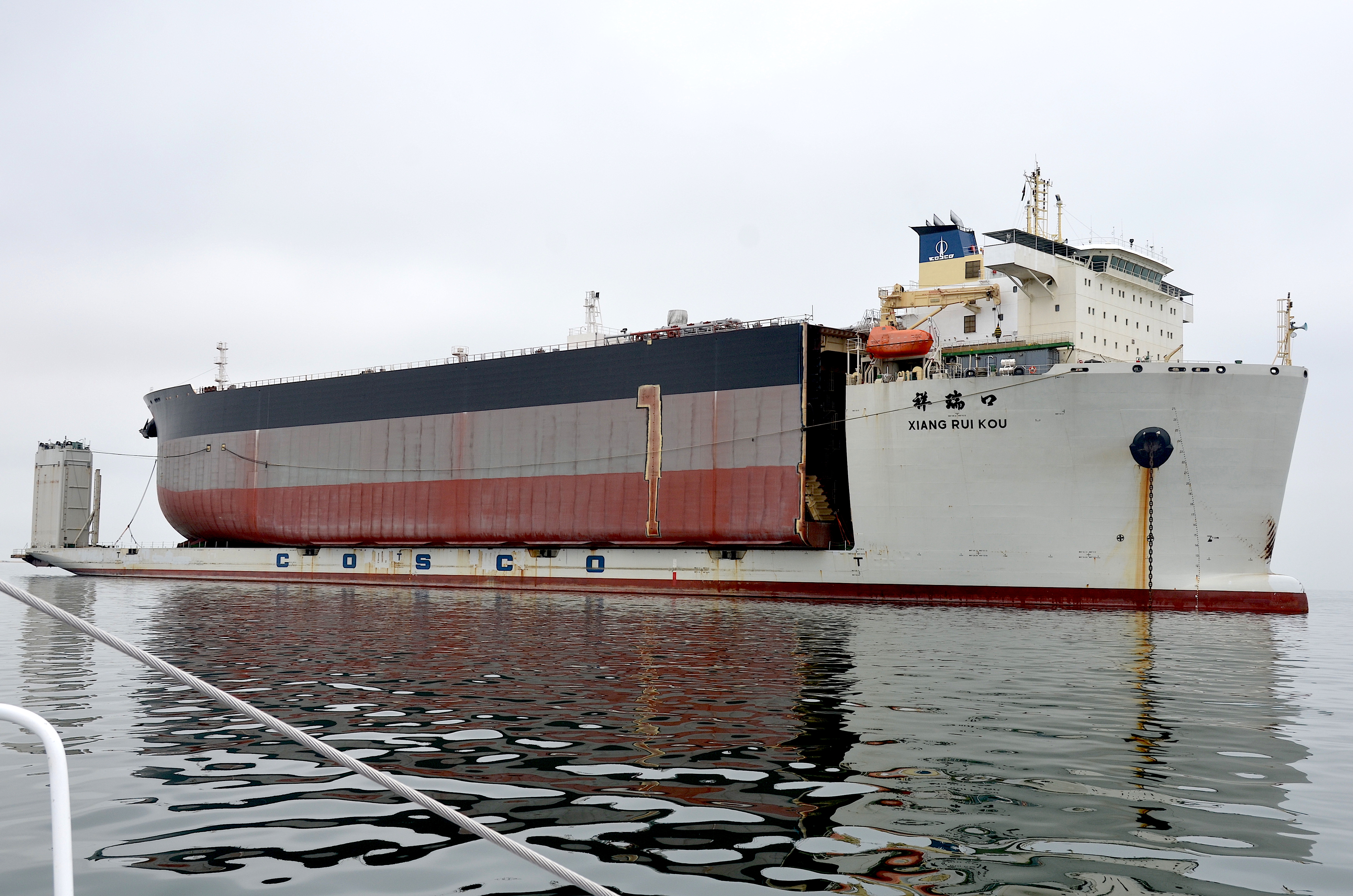
Semi-submersible vessel Xiang Rui Kou

Ship	Built	DWT	Flag	IMO	Notes
Developing Road	1978	13,231	Malta	7714923	
Kang Sheng Kou	2002	17.550	China	9223289	
Tai An Kou	2002	17.550	China	9223277	
Kang Sheng Kou	2003	20,131	China	9223289	
Xiang Rui Kou	2011	48,232	China	9483102	
Xiang Yun Kou	2011	48,232	China	9483097	
Hua Hai Long	2012	30,002	China	9560144	
Xia Zhi Yuan 6	2012	38,000	China	9639452	Pooled vessel
Hai Yang Shi You 278	2016	52,500	Hong Kong	9635793	Pooled vessel
Xiang He Kou	2016	48,163	Hong Kong	9752656	
Xin Guang Hua	2016	98,000	Hong Kong	9751573	

=== Heavy lift ===
Ship	Built	DWT	TEU	Flag	IMO	Notes
Da Zhong	1998	16,957	685	Panama	9153874	
Da Hua	1998	16,957	685	Panama	9153886	
Da Fu	1998	16,957	685	Panama	9153898	
Da Qiang	1998	16,957	685	Panama	9153903	
Da Dan Xia	2009	28,451	1,735	Hong Kong	9451290	
Da Zi Yun	2009	28,451	1,735	Hong Kong	9451305	
Da Yu Xia	2011	28,341	1,735	Hong Kong	9451317	
Da Cui Yun	2011	28,341	1,735	Hong Kong	9451329	
Da Quing Xia	2011	28,341	1,735	Hong Kong	9451331	
Da Tong Yun	2011	28,377	1,753	Hong Kong	9451343	
Da Hong Xia	2011	28,377	1,753	Hong Kong	9451355	
Da Cai Yun	2011	28,377	1,753	Hong Kong	9451367	
Da An	2013	29,840	1,045	Hong Kong	9607825	
Da Kang	2013	28,510	1,045	Hong Kong	9608312	
Da Tai	2013	29,881	1,045	Hong Kong	9608386	
Da Chang	2013	29,902	1,045	Hong Kong	9608386	
Da De	2014	29,572	1,045	China	9608403	
Da Liang	2014	29,636	1,045	China	9608415	
Da Xin	2014	29,565	1,045	China	9608427	
Da Zhi	2014	29,496	1,045	China	9608439	
Tian Fu	2015	38,146		Hong Kong	9704738	
Tian Lu	2015	38,122		Hong Kong	9704740	
Tian Shou	2015	38,134		Hong Kong	9704752	
Tian Xi	2015	38,098		Hong Kong	9704764	
Tian Zhen	2016	38,007		China	9722728	
Tian Le	2016	37,994		China	9722730	

=== Multi-purpose ===
Ship	Built	DWT	TEU	Flag	IMO	Notes
Tong Cheng	1977	18,861		China	7526845	
Rong Cheng	1977	18,687		China	7526857	
Yong Jiang	1978	16,270		China	7529201	
Min Jiang	1978	16,270		China	7529213	
Xiang Jiang	1978	16,270		China		
Ping Jiang	1978	15,300		China	7607481	
Qing Jiang	1978	15,290		China	7611559	
An Wu Jiang	1980	10,800		China	7904865	
An Tao Jiang	1980	10,800		China	7904877	
Yuan Jiang	1981	15,290		China	8011768	
Long An Cheng	1983	23,443	707	Panama	8118255	
Xiang An Cheng	1985	20,621	716	China	8316431	
Bao An Cheng	1985	20,609	716	China	8316443	
Fu Yuan Shan	1985	18,539	604	China	8400490	
Fu Yu Shan	1985	20,225	604	China	8400505	
Feng An Shan	1985	18,270	614	China	8400608	
Feng Kang Shan	1985	18,264	614	China	8400610	
Feng Shun Shan	1985	18,277	614	China	8400622	
An Kang Jiang	1985	15,851	292	China	8400816	
An Long Jiang	1985	15,865	292	China	8400828	
An Ning Jiang	1985	15,837	292	China	8400830	
An Qing Jiang	1985	14,913	232	China	8414922	
An Xin Jiang	1986	14,913	232	China	8414934	
An Yue Jiang	1986	14,913	232	China	8414946	
Fu Wen Shan	1986	17,240	336	China	8601343	
An Bao Jiang	1987	17,324	450	China	8306943	
An Hua Jiang	1987	17,324	534	China	8306955	
An Ze Jiang	1987	14,913	232	China	8414958	
An Guang Jiang	1987	14,913	232	China	8414960	
An Shun Jiang	1987	14,913	232	China	8414972	
Fu Yang Shan	1987	17,139	336	China	8601331	
Fu Kang Shan	1989	17,139	336	China	8601367	
Fu Qing Shan	1989	17,000	336	China	8601355	
Fu Xin Shan	1990	17,110	336	China	8601379	
Jing An Cheng	1992	22,814	450	China	8919544	
Tai An Cheng	1992	22,814	755	China	9015008	
Yong An Cheng	1992	22,814	689	China	8919532	
Fu An Cheng	1994	22,765	100	China	9063251	
Hai An Cheng	1994	22,765	174	China	9063263	
Le Ding	1998	22,271	1,100	China	9177507	
Le Sheng	1998	22,271	1,100	China	9177519	
Le Tai	1999	22,318	1,100	China	9177521	
Le Rong	1999	22,297	1,100	China	9183740	
Le Chang	1999	22,271	1,100	China	9177533	
Le Min	1999	22,278	1,100	China	9175420	
Le Shun	1999	22,296	1,100	China	9183752	
Le Jin	1999	22,296	1,110	China	9183764	
Le Ye	1999	22,279	750	China	9175432	
Le Tong	2000	22,278	1,100	China	9175444	
Le Yi	2000	29,161	1.069	China	9192662	
Le Li	2000	29,161	1.069	China	9192674	
Le Cong	2000	29,108	1.069	China	9192686	
Le He	2001	29,101	1.069	China	9192698	
Feng Huang Song	2009	27,300	1,344	Hong Kong	9416757	
Kong Que Song	2010	26,126	1,344	Hong Kong	9416757	
Qi Lin Song	2010	27,307	1,344	Hong Kong	9416771	
Wo Long Song	2010	27,000	1,344	Hong Kong	9416783	
Du Juan Song	2011	27,438	1,344	Hong Kong	9608805	
Fu Rong Song	2011	27,421	1,344	Hong Kong	9608817	
Luan Hua Song	2011	27,412	1,344	Hong Kong	9608829	
Ji Xiang Song	2011	27,351	1,344	China	9608922	
Mu Dan Song	2012	27,410	1,344	Hong Kong	9608831	
Mu Mian Song	2012	27,372	1,344	Hong Kong	9608843	
Zi Jing Song	2012	27,402	1,344	Hong Kong	9608910	
Ru Yi Song	2012	27,302	1,344	Hong Kong	9608934	
Ping An Song	2012	27,305	1,344	China	9608946	
Xing Fu Song	2012	27,292	1,344	China	9608958	

=== Log carrier ===
Ship	Built	DWT	Flag	IMO	Notes
Jin Sha Ling	1990	28,457	China	8914233	
Jin Niu Ling	1992	28,470	China	9060209	
Jin Da Ling	1992	28,215	Panama	9170664	
Xi Chang Hai	1997	28,544	China	9127942	
Rui Chang Hai	1997	27,288	China	9127954	
Hai Wang Xing	2008	9,106	Panama	9464235	
Jin Guang Ling	2009	31,830	Hong Kong	9487079	
Jin Yuan Ling	2009	31,772	Hong Kong	9487081	
Jin Xing Ling	2009	31,853	Hong Kong	9487093	
Jin Wang Ling	2010	31,775	Hong Kong	9487108	
COSCO Wuyishan	2010	31,958	Hong Kong	9418303	
COSCO Jingangshan	2010	31,898	Hong Kong	9418315	
COSCO Taihangshan	2010	31,889	Hong Kong	9418327	
COSCO Kunlunshan	2010	31,917	Hong Kong	9418339	

=== Asphalt ===
Ship	Built	DWT	Flag	IMO	Notes
Hong Jiang	1984	4,926	China	8904575	
An Tai Jiang	1985	4,926	Hong Kong	8601288	
Ya Jiang	1985	4,926	Hong Kong	8315891	
Hanjiang	1985	4,926	China	8322739	
An Ji Jiang	1986	4,926	China	8322727	
An Da Jiang	1986	4,926	China	8720773	
Yu Liang Wan	1999	10,767	Hong Kong	9159816	
Ya Long Wan	2007	6,012	Hong Kong	9360398	
Mu Lan Wan	2007	6,012	Hong Kong	9360403	
Da Peng Wan	2007	6,012	Hong Kong	9383340	
Fu Ning Wan	2008	6,012	Hong Kong	9383352	
Zhen Zhu Wan	2008	6,315	China	9406855	
Ping Hai Wan	2009	6,115	Panama	9558579	
An Hai Wan	2009	6,165	Panama	9563108	
Xing Hai Wan	2009	6,123	Panama	9570113	
Ning Hai Wan	2009	6,118	Panama	9578385	
San Du Ao	2011	12,780	Hong Kong	9608752	
Zhuang Yuan Ao	2012	12,000	Hong Kong	9650339	

=== Ro-Ro cargo ===
Ship	Built	DWT	Flag	IMO	Notes
San Jiang Kou	1980	13,826	China	7902881	Scrapped in 2012
Chi Feng Kou	1980	13,810	China	7902879	Scrapped in 2012
Guan He Kou	1980	13,798	China	7902893	Scrapped in 2012
Fu Yuan Kou	1982	2,796	China	8125636	
Fu Quan Kou	1982	9,300	China	8209389	
Fu Kuan Kou	1983	3.516	China	?	
Chang Fa Kou	1985	11,678	China	8321943	
Yu Heng Xian Feng	1998	13,418	China	9166895	
COSCO Shengshi	2011	14,868	Panama	9454711	
COSCO Tengfei	2011	14,707	Panama	9454723	

== Passenger/cargo liners ==
Ship	Built	DWT	Flag	IMO	Notes
Su Zhou Hao	1992	2,235	China	9030632	Operates Shanghai — Osaka
COSCO Star	1993	5,868	Hong Kong	9073440	Operates Xiamen — Taiwan
Xin Jian Zhen	1994	4,321	China	9065376	Operates Shanghai — Kobe/Osaka
Zi Yu Lan	1995	6,512	Panama	9086899	Operates Yantai — Incheon
Xiang Xue Lan	1996	6,513	Panama	9086904	Operates Yantai — Incheon

== Sources ==
- "Fleet List". Cosco Group.
- "Shipping Specialised Carriers". coscol.com.cn. Archived from the original on 11 August 2017.
- "Global Ship Tracking". Marine Traffic.
