= Longtian =

Longtian or Long-Tian, may refer to:

== Longtian (龙田) ==
- Longtian Subdistrict (Chinese: 龙田街道; pinyin: Lóngtián Jiēdào; Jyutping: Lung4 Tin4 Gai1dou6), Pingshan, Shenzhen, Guangdong, China
- Longtien Air Base, China; see List of People's Liberation Army Air Force airbases

=== Villages (龙田村, Lóng-tián Cūn) ===
- Longtian, Ningjiaping, You, Hunan, China
- Longtian, Yandong, Bama Yao, Guangxi Zhuang, China

=== Towns (龙田镇, Lóng-tián Zhèn) ===
- Longtian, Fujian, in Fuqing, Fujian, China
- Longtian, Longmen County, in Longmen County, Guangdong, China
- Longtian, Xingning, in Xingning, Guangdong, China
- Longtian, Guizhou, in Cengong County, Guizhou, China
- Longtian, Ningxiang County, in Ningxiang County, Hunan, China

=== Townships (龙田乡, Lóng-tián Xiāng) ===
- Longtian Township, Anhui, in Xiuning County, Anhui, China
- Longtian Township, Chongqing, in Chengkou County, Chongqing, China
- Longtian Township, Hongjiang, in Hongjiang, Hunan, China
- Longtian Township, Wugang, in Wugang, Hunan, China
- Longtian Township, Jiangxi, in Yongxin County, Jiangxi, China

== Other uses ==
- Longtian railway station (隆田車站), Guantian, Tainan, Taiwan
- Longtian Village, Luye Township, Taitung County, Taiwan
- Longtian Village, Taipei City Constituency III, Taipei, Taiwan
- Longtian Village (垅田村, Longtian Cun), Lancun Township, Hunan, China
- Longtian House, Kengzi Subdistrict, Shenzhen, Guangdong, China; see Kengzi station
- Longtian Pagoda, Wuyuan County, Jiangxi, China
- Longtian (龙天), a neighbourhood in Haibin Subdistrict, Baodi, Tianjin, China

== See also ==
- Tian-Long (disambiguation)
- Long (disambiguation)
- Tian (disambiguation)
- LT (disambiguation)
