= TH-12 =

Rocket engine

- Country of origin: China
- Manufacturer: Space Pioneer
- Status: Active

Liquid-fuel engine
- Propellant: LOX / RP-1

Performance
- Thrust, vacuum: 1,350 kilonewtons (300,000 lbf)
- Thrust, sea-level: 1,090 kilonewtons (250,000 lbf)
- Throttle range: 40%~110%
- Thrust-to-weight ratio: 163
- Specific impulse, vacuum: 335s
- Specific impulse, sea-level: 285s

Used in
- Tianlong-3

The TH-12 (Chinese: 天火-12; pinyin: Tiānhuǒ-12, lit. Sky Fire 12) is an oxidizer-rich gas-generator cycle rocket engine burning LOX and kerosene developed by Space Pioneer. The TH-12 utilizes 3D printing and has the highest target thrust among all commercial rocket engines in China. The engine features deep throttling for reusability, re-ignition, thrust vectoring, and multi-mode starters.

== History ==
Space Pioneer proposed the TH-12 engine for its Tianlong-3 launch vehicle. Engine development was underway in December 2020, with the first gas generator test performed in September 2022. In November 2022, a full-stage developmental TH-12 engine successfully completed its first static fire test.

On July 24, 2023, the TH-12 engine, in the flight configuration of the first Tianlong-3 rocket, successfully completed a full-duration hot fire test at rated conditions for a single burn duration of 100 seconds, accumulating a total test duration of 200 seconds. This test demonstrated that the engine met the flight requirements for the Tianlong-3 rocket.

In early January 2024, the TH-12 engine completed a calibration hot fire test for the first flight batch, subjecting the engine to a 50-second process verification test at rated conditions, demonstrating rapid startup, smooth operation, and normal shutdown. Later that month, the TH-12 engine underwent a spot check hot fire test for the first flight batch, fully simulating the flight conditions of the inaugural Tianlong-3 launch. The test involved 6 consecutive ignitions of the engine without removal from the test stand, accumulating a total test duration exceeding 1,000 seconds, with the single engine operating time surpassing the planned flight duration by a factor of 6.
