= The Gateless Barrier =

Compilation of Zen Buddhist koans

The Gateless Barrier (Mandarin: 無門關 Wúménguān; Japanese: 無門関 Mumonkan), sometimes translated as The Gateless Gate, is a collection of 48 Chan koans compiled in the early 13th century by the Chinese master Wumen Huikai (無門慧開; Japanese: Mumon Ekai; 1183–1260) during the Song dynasty. The title has a double meaning and can also be understood as Wumen's Barrier; Wumen's name, which literally means "no gate", is the title's first two characters. Wumen's preface indicates that the volume was published in 1228. Each koan is accompanied by a commentary and verse by Wumen. A classic edition includes a 49th case composed by Anwan in 1246. Wuliang Zongshou also supplemented the volume with a verse of four stanzas composed in 1230 about the three barriers of Chan master Huanglong Huinan.

Since the Southern Song dynasty, the Chinese Buddhist canon has not included The Gateless Barrier, but Wumen's disciples brought the work to Japan, where it has been reprinted many times. It is collected in volume 48 of the Taishō Tripiṭaka. Along with the Blue Cliff Record and the oral tradition of Hakuin Ekaku, The Gateless Gate is a central work much used in Rinzai School practice. Five of the koans in the work concern the sayings and doings of Zhaozhou; four concern Ummon.

The common theme of the koans and Wumen's comments is the inquiry and introspection of dualistic conceptualization. Each koan epitomizes one or more of the polarities of consciousness that act like an obstacle or wall to the insight. The student is challenged to transcend the polarity that the koan represents and demonstrate or show that transcendence to the Zen teacher.

== Structure and contents ==
The text was originally prepared by Wumen as a record of his teaching during a monastic training period held at Longxiang Temple (now Jiangxin Temple in Wenzhou) in the summer of 1228. Wumen selected the 48 koans and commented on and added a verse for each koan.

As was customary in China at the time, an edition might have additions of text inserted by a subsequent owner or publisher. The best known version of the text is from the Japanese woodblock edition made from the 1246 manuscript edition that contains the following sections.

- An untitled introduction by Chen Xun (陈埙), publisher of the 1228 edition, written in the self-deprecating style of Chan humor.
- An untitled dedication by Wumen to the Emperor and Empress. Works without such dedications were subject to Imperial censorship as being seditious.
- An untitled foreword by Wumen followed by a verse on the title.
- A table of contents with the title of each koan. However, the koans are unnumbered in both the table of contents and the body of the text and there are no page numbers in the text, so the table of contents is the list of the koan's titles in order of appearance.
- The 48 koans presented in four parts consisting of (1) a title composed of four characters, (2) the body of the koan beginning with the name of the protagonist of the case, (3) a comment beginning with the words "Wumen says" (無門曰), and a verse (頌古) beginning with the words "The verse says" (頌曰).
- An untitled afterword by Wumen that ends with the words "The end of the volume the Gateless Barrier."
- An appendix believed to be written by Wumen titled "Zen Caveats" or "Zen Warnings" consisting of twelve one-line aphorisms about Zen practice written in the style of Zen contrariness that points to not falling for either side of dualistic thinking. For example, Zen is known as the school of Buddhism that does not stand on written words and one caveat says, "Neglecting the written records with unrestrained ideas is falling into a deep pit."
- An appendix titled "Huanglong's Three Barriers" (黄龍三關) written by Wuliang Zongshou (無量宗壽) in the late spring of 1230 C.E. Huanglong Huinan (黃龍慧南), 1002–1069, was a Zen master who promulgated three questions as one-line koans: "Everyone exists by a particular cause of birth. What is your cause of birth?" "How is my hand like the hand of Buddha?" "How is my leg like the leg of a donkey?" Wuliang wrote four four-line stanzas (Sanskrit gathas). Each of the first three stanzas comments on one of Huanglong's three questions and the fourth stanza is a summation. Wuliang writes that he penned the four verses to thank and commemorate Wumen's recent stay at Ruiyan (瑞巖) (Lucky Cliff) monastery where Wumen was the visiting head teacher for the training period.
- A short untitled addendum by Menggong (孟拱) written on the republishing of the work in the summer of 1245 C.E. It referred to Bodhidharma's famous Zen motto: "Not maintaining written words, but pointing directly to the human heart-mind to see one's own nature to become Buddha".
- A 49th koan added by jushi Anwan (安晚居士) dated the beginning of summer 1246, attributed to Wu'an (無庵) and presented in the same format as the koans compiled by Wumen.

== List of chapters ==
The table below lists the 48 koans in The Gateless Barrier:

No.	Chinese	English translation
1	趙州狗子	Zhaozhou's Dog
2	百丈野狐	Baizhang's Wild Fox
3	俱胝豎指	Juzhi Holds Up a Finger
4	胡子無鬚	The Barbarian Has No Beard
5	香嚴上樹	Xiangyan's Up in a Tree
6	世尊拈花	The World-Honored One Holds Up a Flower
7	趙州洗缽	Zhaozhou's “Wash the Bowl”
8	奚仲造車	Xizhong Builds Carts
9	大通智勝	Great Pervasive Excellent Wisdom
10	清稅孤貧	Qingshui, Solitary and Destitute
11	州勘庵主	Zhaozhou Tests the Hermits
12	巖喚主人	Rui Calls His Boss
13	德山托缽	Deshan Carries His Bowl
14	南泉斬貓	Nanquan Kills a Cat
15	洞山三頓	Dongshan’s Thirty Blows
16	鐘聲七條	The Sound of the Bell, the Monk’s Robe
17	國師三喚	The National Teacher Calls Three Times
18	洞山三斤	Dongshan’s Three Pounds of Hemp
19	平常是道	Ordinary mind is the way
20	大力量人	The Person of Great Power
21	雲門屎橛	Yunmen's Dried Shitstick
22	迦葉剎竿	Mahakashyapa’s Temple Flagpole
23	不思善惡	Without Thinking of Good or Evil
24	離卻語言	Apart from Words and Speech
25	三座說法	The Third-Ranked Monk Preaches the Dharma
26	二僧卷簾	Two Monks Roll Up a Curtain
27	不是心佛	Not the Mind, Not the Buddha, Not Things
28	久響龍潭	Long Have We Heard of Longtan
29	非風非幡	Not the Wind, Not the Flag
30	即心即佛	The Mind is the Buddha
31	趙州勘婆	Zhaozhou Tests the Old Woman
32	外道問佛	An Outsider Questions the Buddha
33	非心非佛	Not the Mind, Not the Buddha
34	智不是道	Wisdom Is Not the Path
35	倩女離魂	When a Beautiful Woman’s Spirit Departs
36	路逢達道	If You Meet a Person Who Has Consummated the Path
37	庭前柏樹	The Cypress in the Garden
38	牛過窗櫺	A Water Buffalo Passing through a Window Frame
39	雲門話墮	Yunmen: “You Have Said Something Improper”
40	趯倒淨瓶	Kicking Over the Water Jar
41	達磨安心	Bodhidharma Pacifies the Mind
42	女子出定	The Girl Comes Out of Samadhi
43	首山竹篦	Shoushan’s Bamboo Comb
44	芭蕉拄杖	Bajiao’s Staff
45	他是阿誰	Who Is He?
46	竿頭進步	Step Forward from the Top of the Pole
47	兜率三關	Tushita's Three Barriers
48	乾峰一路	Qianfeng’s One Road

== Zen Caveats ==
Wumen's afterword, titled "Zen Caveats" (禪箴), has one-line aphorisms dealing with Zen practice. The word zhēn (箴) means "caveat", "warning", or "admonition", but it also has the meaning of "needle" or "probe" (as in acupuncture needles) and is sometimes translated as "Zen Needles". As with the main koans, each caveat challenges the Zen student's attachment to dualistic concepts, here those especially related to Zen practice.

- Following the rules and protecting the regulations is binding oneself without rope.
- Moving freely vertically and horizontally without obstruction is the way of outsiders and the nightmare army.
- To preserve the heart mind and to purify it by letting impurities settle to the bottom in quiescence is the perverted Zen of silent illumination.
- Neglecting the written records with unrestrained ideas is falling into a deep pit.
- To be awake and not ignorant is to wear chains and shoulder a cangue.
- Thinking good and thinking evil are the halls of heaven and hell.
- A view of Buddha and a view of Dharma are the two enclosing mountains of iron.
- A person who perceives thoughts as they immediately arise is fiddling with spectral consciousness.
- However, being on a high plateau practicing samadhi is the stratagem of living in the house of ghosts.
- To advance results in ignoring truth; to retreat results in contradicting the lineage.
- Neither to advance nor to retreat is being a breathing corpse.
- Just say, how will you walk?
- You must work hard to live in the present and, to finish, all the more. I do not advise the unfortunate excess of continual suffering.

== See also ==
- 101 Zen Stories
- Blue Cliff Record
- Book of Equanimity
