= Belgium-class container ship =

Container ship class

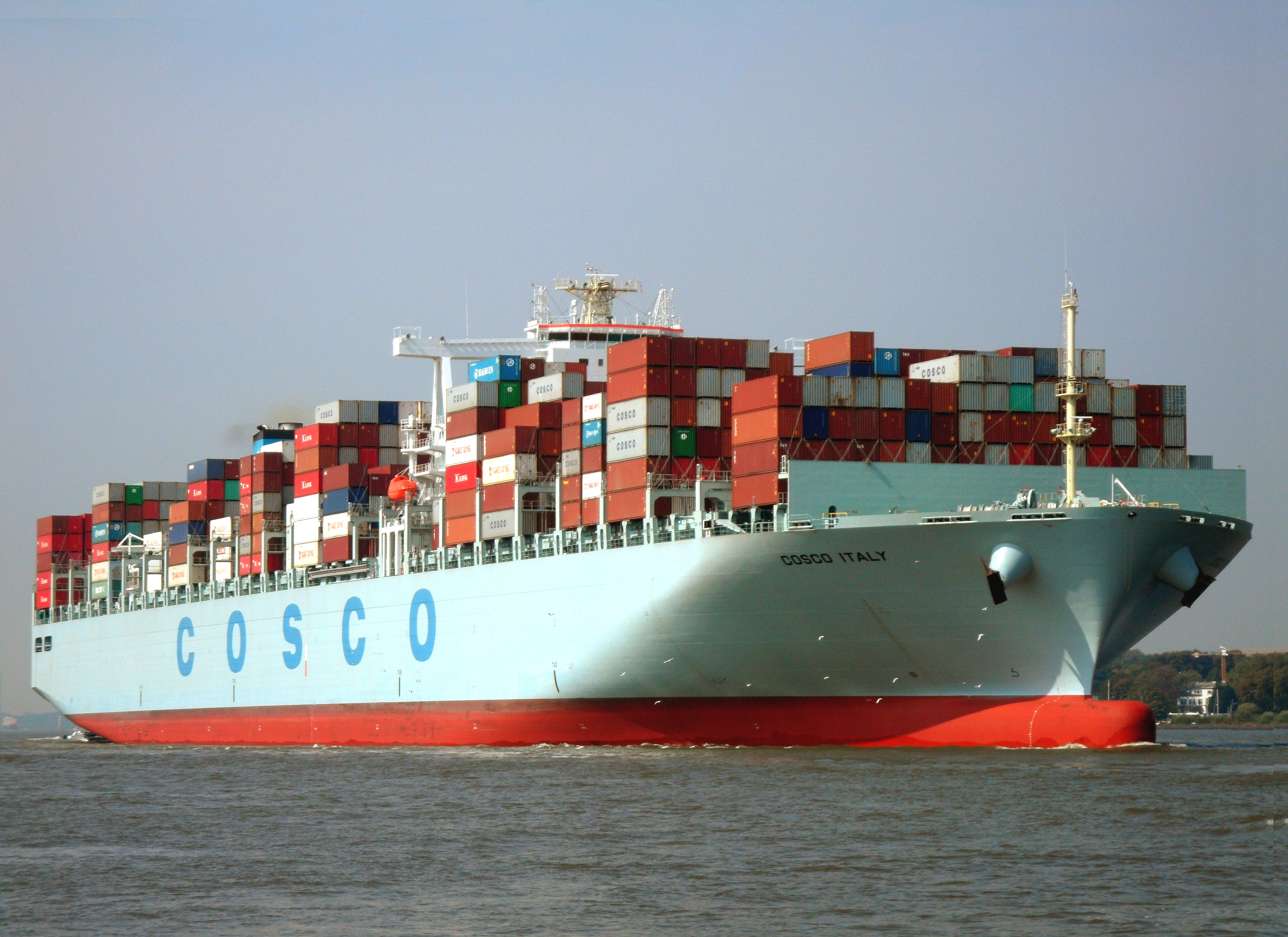
- COSCO Italy on the Elbe

Class overview
- Builders: Nantong Cosco KHI Ship Engineering
- Operators: Cosco Shipping Lines
- In service: 2013–present
- Planned: 8
- Completed: 8
- Active: 8

General characteristics
- Type: Container ship
- Tonnage: 153,666 GT
- Length: 365.9 m (1,200 ft 6 in)
- Beam: 51.2 m (168 ft 0 in)
- Draught: 14.5 m (47 ft 7 in)
- Capacity: 13,386 TEU

The Belgium class is a series of eight container ships operated by Cosco Shipping Lines and built by Nantong Cosco KHI Ship Engineering in China. The ships have a maximum theoretical capacity of 13,386 TEU.

== List of ships ==
Ship	Yard number	IMO number	Delivery	Status	ref
COSCO Belgium	NE111	9516404	28 Feb 2013	In service	
COSCO France	NE112	9516416	24 May 2013	In service	
COSCO England	NE113	9516428	30 Aug 2013	In service	
COSCO Netherlands	NE114	9516430	18 Nov 2013	In service	
COSCO Spain	NE115	9516442	14 Feb 2014	In service	
COSCO Italy	NE116	9516454	29 Apr 2014	In service	
COSCO Portugal	NE117	9516466	7 Jul 2014	In service	
COSCO Denmark	NE118	9516478	24 Sep 2014	In service	

== See also ==
- COSCO Glory-class container ship
