= TH-11 =

Rocket engine

- Country of origin: China
- Manufacturer: Space Pioneer
- Status: Active

Liquid-fuel engine
- Propellant: LOX / RP-1

Performance
- Thrust, vacuum: 300 kilonewtons (67,000 lbf)
- Thrust, sea-level: 257 kilonewtons (58,000 lbf)
- Throttle range: 50%~110%
- Thrust-to-weight ratio: 130
- Chamber pressure: 10 MPa (1,500 psi)
- Specific impulse, vacuum: 340.6s
- Specific impulse, sea-level: 291.8s

Used in
- Tianlong-2

The TH-11 (Chinese: 天火-11; pinyin: Tiānhuǒ-11, lit. Sky Fire 11) is an oxidizer-rich staged combustion cycle rocket engine burning LOX and kerosene developed by Space Pioneer. The TH-11 engine features a reusable design, staged combustion cycle, wide usage of 3D printed components (>80%), and short development time, making it a notable achievement within the Chinese commercial space industry.

== History ==
Space Pioneer proposed the TH-11 engine for its Tianlong-2 launch vehicle. Full-system hot-fire tests were completed in June 2021. The Tianlong-2 rocket successfully completed its maiden flight on April 2, 2023, achieving the targeted orbit. Powered by a single Tianhuo-11 engine in its second stage, this launch marked the engine's operational debut.
