= Xiangyan Zhixian =

Tang dynasty Chan master (c. 820–898)

Xiangyan Zhixian (Chinese: 香嚴智閑; pinyin: Xiāngyán Zhìxián; Wade–Giles: Hsiang-yen Chih-hsien; Japanese: Kyōgen Chikan; c. 820–898) was a Tang dynasty Chan master of the Guiyang school. A Dharma heir of Guishan Lingyou, the story of Xiangyan's enlightenment is rather famous in the Chan and Zen traditions. According to this story, he had been an accomplished scholar of Buddhist sūtras, but for many years had made very little headway in his meditation practice. One day, his master asked him what his original face was before birth, to which he could not respond. He subsequently burned his sūtras and left the monastery because he could not figure it out. One day, while working, he heard the sound of a tile striking the ground and attained enlightenment.

Additionally, there is a kōan attributed to Xiangyan in The Gateless Gate: the story is that of a man hanging in a tree by his teeth being asked why Bodhidharma came west; how the man is to react became this famous kōan.
