= Glory-class container ship =

Container ship class

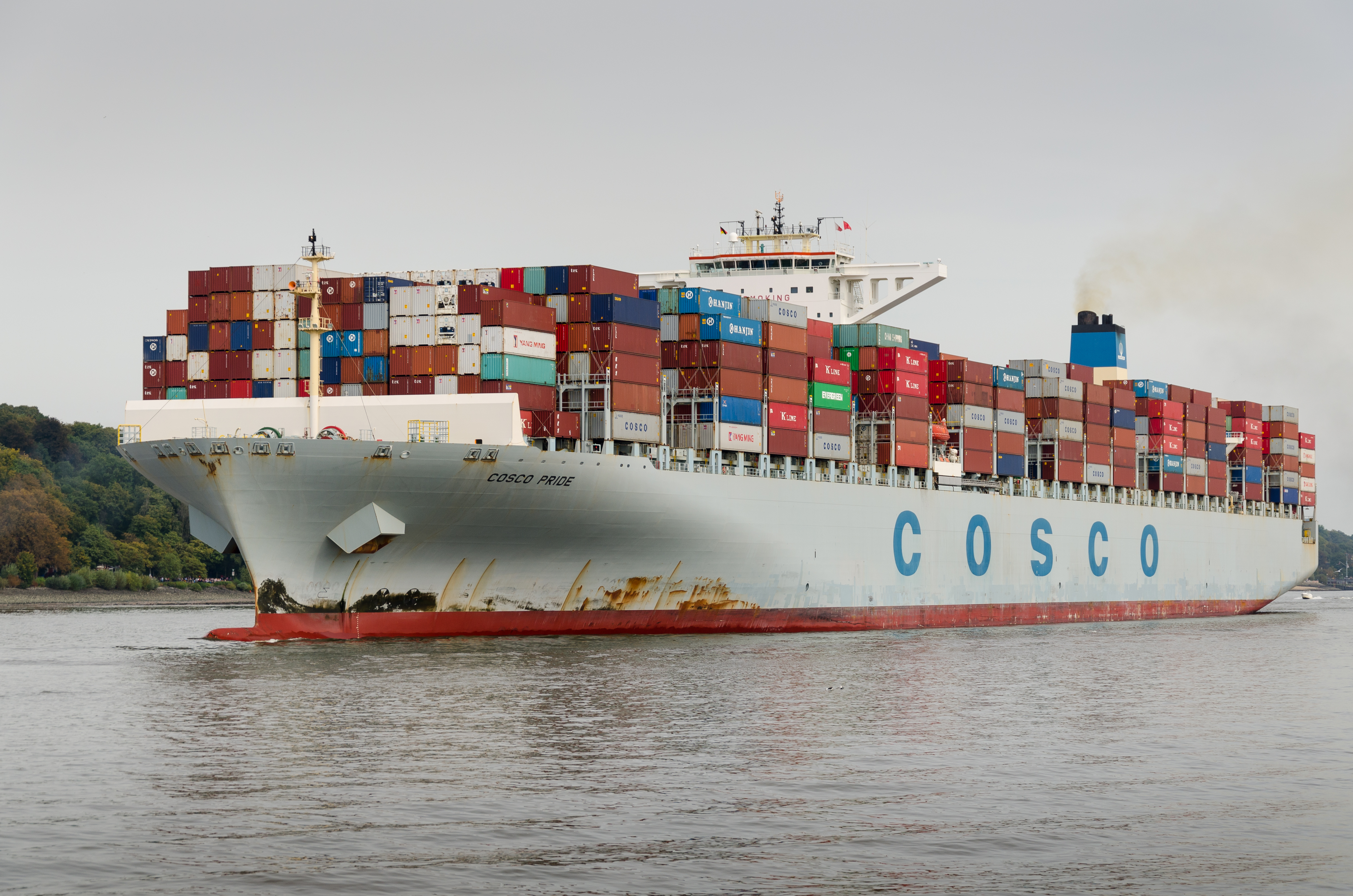
- COSCO Pride on the Elbe

Class overview
- Builders: Hyundai Heavy Industries; Hyundai Samho Heavy Industries
- Operators: COSCO SHIPPING Lines
- In service: 2011-present
- Planned: 8
- Building: 0
- Completed: 8
- Active: 8

General characteristics
- Type: Container ship
- Tonnage: 141,823 GT
- Length: 366.45 m (1,202 ft)
- Beam: 48.2 m (158 ft)
- Draught: 15.5 m (51 ft)
- Capacity: 13,114 TEU

The Glory class is a series of 8 container ships currently operated by COSCO SHIPPING Lines and built by Hyundai Heavy Industries in South Korea. The ships have a maximum theoretical capacity of 13,114 TEU.

The ships were ordered in 2007 by Seaspan Corporation for a 12-year charter to COSCO Container Lines. The first ship was delivered in 2011.

== List of ships ==
Ship	Yard number	IMO number	Delivery	Status	ref
Hyundai Heavy Industries
COSCO Glory	2177	9466245	10 Jun 2011	In service	
COSCO Pride	2181	9472153	29 Jun 2011	In service	
COSCO Development	2179	9472139	10 Aug 2011	In service	
COSCO Fortune	2178	9472127	27 Apr 2012	In service	
COSCO Faith	2180	9472141	14 Mar 2012	In service	
Hyundai Samho Heavy Industries
COSCO Harmony	S453	9472177	19 Aug 2011	In service	
COSCO Excellence	S454	9472189	7 Mar 2012	In service	
COSCO Hope	S452	9472165	18 Apr 2012	In service	

== See also ==
- COSCO Belgium-class container ship
