= Tianlong =

Mythological creature

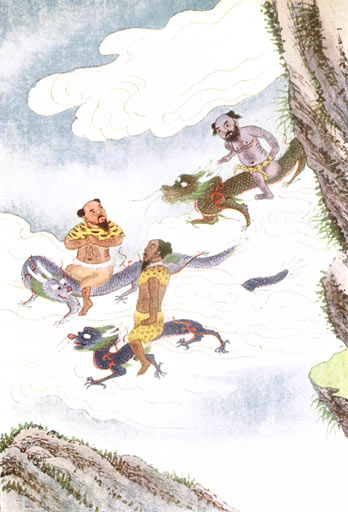
Xian riding dragons

Tianlong (simplified Chinese: 天龙; traditional Chinese: 天龍; pinyin: tiānlóng; Wade–Giles: t'ien lung; lit. "heavenly dragon") is a flying dragon in Chinese mythology, a star in Chinese astrology, and a proper name.

== Word ==
The term tianlong combines tian 天 "heaven" and long 龍 "dragon". Since tian literally means "heaven; the heavens; sky" or figuratively "Heaven; God; gods", tianlong can denote "heavenly dragon; celestial dragon" or "holy dragon; divine dragon".

Tianlong 天龍 is homophonous with another name in Chinese folklore. Tianlong 天聾 "Heavenly Deaf" (with the character long 聾 "deaf" combining the "ear radical" 耳 and a long 龍 phonetic element) and Diya 地啞 "Earthly Dumb" are legendary attendants to Wenchang Wang 文昌王, the patron deity of literature.

== Meanings ==
From originally denoting "heavenly dragon", Tianlong 天龍 semantically developed meanings as Buddhist "heavenly Nāgas" or "Devas and Nāgas", "centipede", and "proper names" of stars, people, and places.

=== Dragons ===
Among Chinese classic texts, tian "heaven" and long "dragon" were first used together in Zhou dynasty (1122 BCE – 256 BCE) writings, but the word tianlong was not recorded until the Han dynasty (207 BCE – 220 CE).

The ancient Yijing "Book of Changes" exemplifies using tian "heaven" and long "dragon" together. Qian 乾 "The Creative", the first hexagram, says:

Nine (it stands for a solid horizontal line that symbolizes the yang. Why nine is used is unclear.) in the fifth place means: Flying dragons in the heavens. It furthers one to see the great man.
九五，飞龙在天，利见大人

— Qian 乾 "The Creative", Yijing

Commentaries on these explain:

Because the holy man is clear as to the end and the beginning, as to the way in which each of the six stages completes itself in its own time, he mounts on them toward heaven as though on six dragons.
大明終始，六位時成。時乘六龍以御天

— Commentary on the Decision (彖傳)

'Flying dragon in the heavens.' This shows the great man at work.
飛龍在天，大人造也。

—Commentary on the Images (象傳)

The earliest usage of tianlong 天龍 "heavenly dragon", according to the Hanyu Da Cidian, is in the Xinxu 新序 "New Prefaces" by Liu Xiang (79–8 BCE). It records a story about Zigao, the Duke of Ye, who professed to love dragons. After he carved and painted dragon images throughout his house, a [天龍] heavenly dragon [or fulong 夫龍 in some editions] came to visit, but Ye was scared and ran away.

The Fangyan 方言 dictionary by Yang Xiong (53 BCE – 18 CE) has another early usage of tian and long. It defines panlong 蟠龍 "coiled dragon" as 未陞天龍, syntactically meaning either "Dragons which do not yet ascend to heaven" or "Heavenly Dragons which do not yet ascend".

=== Asterisms ===
Tianlong Heavenly Dragon names both the Western constellation Draco and a star in the Chinese constellation Azure Dragon.

Tianlongza 天龍座 "Heavenly Dragon Seat/Constellation" is the Chinese translation of Draco (from Latin "Dragon"), a constellation near the north celestial pole. The (1578 CE) Bencao Gangmu pharmacopeia's entry for long "dragon" describes "a pearl under its chin", and Read notes,

The constellation Draco has the appearance of guarding and encircling the northern pole which is the centre of the movement of the fixed stars. The Chinese paintings of the Dragon straining after a mystical "Pearl" undoubtedly relate to this relationship to the North Pole Star, though other explanations are given for this.

Tianlong 天龍 "Heavenly Dragon" is the 3rd star in Fangxiu 房宿 "Room (Chinese constellation)" and corresponds to the Western constellation Scorpius. "Room" is the 4th of the Twenty-eight mansions in the Azure Dragon, which is one of the celestial Four Symbols. Wolfram Eberhard notes, "When the dragon star appeared in the sky it was customary to make a sacrifice supplicating for rain," and this springtime dragon festival occurs on the 2nd day of the 2nd month.

=== Centipede ===
The Bencao Gangmu entry for wugong 蜈蚣 "centipede" lists tianlong 天龍 "heavenly dragon" as an alternate name. Li Shizhen's commentary reviews earlier Chinese commentators and texts. The Zhuangzi says, "People eat meat, deer eat grass, [蝍且] giant centipedes savor snakes, hawks and crows relish mice." The Huainanzi says, "The [騰蛇] ascending snake can drift in the mist, yet it is endangered by the [蝍蛆] centipede." The Erya dictionary defines jili 蒺蔾 "thorns; puncture vine; bramble" as jieju 蝍蛆 "centipede; cricket"; which Guo Pu's commentary says resembles a huang 蝗 "locust" with a large abdomen, long horns, and which eats snake brains. Although jieju can also mean xishuai 蟋蟀 "cricket", Li concludes it means the snake-controlling wugong "centipede" that the Fangyan dictionary also calls maxian 馬蚿 "horse/giant millipede" or juqu 蛆蟝. According to Eberhard, centipedes were snake predators, and "the enmity between snake and centipede occurs in many folktales and customs."

=== Buddhist usages ===
In Chinese Buddhist terminology, tianlong means either "heavenly Nāgas (dragon gods)" or "Devas (heavenly gods) and Nāgas".

First, tianlong 天龍 means "heavenly dragon/nāga" as the first of four nāga classes in Mahayana tradition.

1. Heavenly Nāgas (天龍), who guard the Heavenly Palace and carry it so that it does not fall.
2. Divine Nāgas (神龍), who benefit mankind by causing the clouds to rise and the rain to fall.
3. Earthly Nāgas (地龍) who drain off rivers (remove the obstructions) and open sluices (outlets).
4. Nāgas who are lying hidden (伏藏龍) who guard the treasures of the "Cakravartin" (轉輪王) and blesses mankind.

Hangzhou Tianlong 杭州天龍 "Heavenly Dragon from Hangzhou" was a 9th-century Chan Buddhist master who enlightened Juzhi Yizhi by holding up one finger. The Blue Cliff Record (tr. Cleary 1977:123-8) calls this "Chu Ti's One-Finger Ch'an" kōan.

Second, tianlong 天龍 translates Sanskrit deva-nāga "Devas and Nāgas", the 2 highest categories of the Tianlong Babu 天龍八部 "8 kinds of beings that protect the Dharma". The lower 6 categories are yecha 夜叉 "Yaksha; cannibalistic devils; nature spirits", gantapo 乾闥婆 "Gandharva; half-ghost music masters", axiuluo 阿修羅 "Asura; evil and violent demigods", jialouluo 迦樓羅 "Garuda; golden bird-like demons that eat dragons", jinnaluo 緊那羅 "Kinnara; half-human half-bird celestial music masters", and maholuluojia 摩睺羅迦 "Mahoraga; earthly snake spirits".

Tianlong Babu 天龍八部 is also the title of a 1963 wuxia novel by Jin Yong, translated as English Demi-Gods and Semi-Devils. This Chinese title is further used by movies, television series, and a Massively multiplayer online role-playing game.

=== Proper names ===
Tianlong is a common name in Standard Chinese. Tianlongshan 天龍山 "Heavenly Dragon Mountain", which is located near Taiyuan in Shanxi, is famous for the Tianlongshan Shiku Grottoes (天龍山石窟). The commercial name Tianlong "Heavenly Dragon" is used by companies, hotels, and gungfu schools.

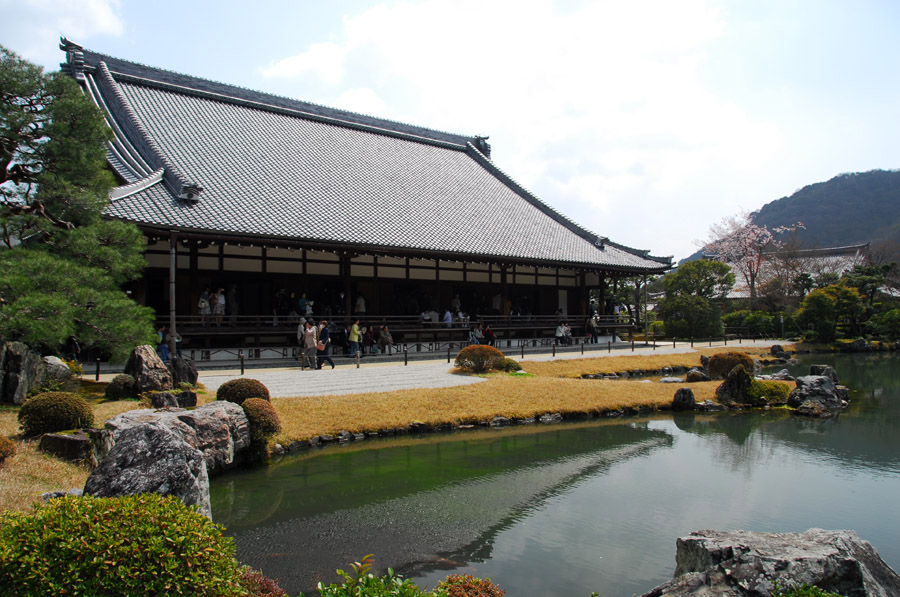
Tenryū-ji garden

Japanese Tenryū 天龍 or 天竜, a loanword from Chinese Tianlong, is a comparable proper name. A famous example is Tenryū-ji 天龍寺 "Heavenly Dragon Temple" in Kyoto, which is headquarters of the Tenryū-ji Branch of the Rinzai sect. Tenryū place names include a waterway (Tenryū River 天竜川), a city (Tenryū, Shizuoka 天竜市), and a village (Tenryū, Nagano 天龍村). Further examples include Imperial Japanese Navy names (Japanese cruiser Tenryū 天龍), and personal names (Genichiro Tenryu 天龍源一郎, a wrestler).
