= COSCO Hellas =

Container ship

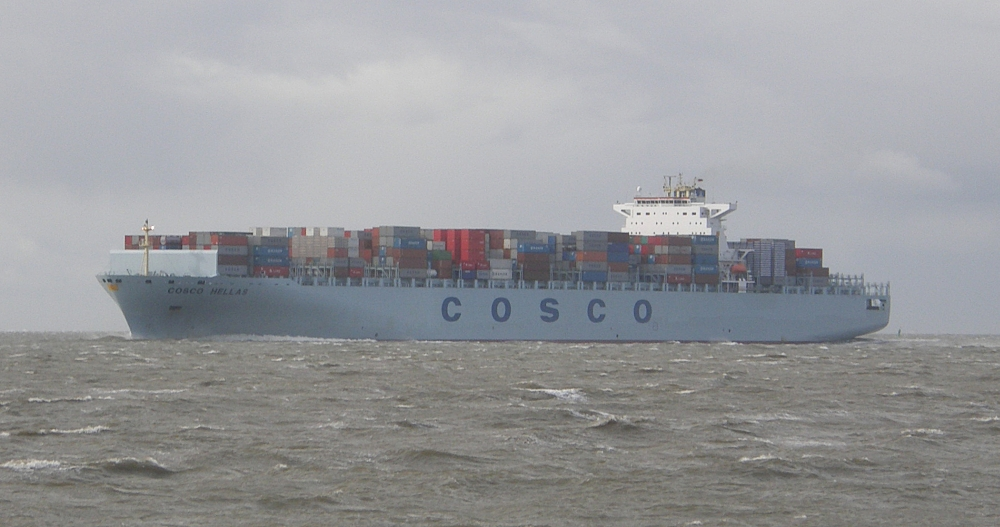
- The Cosco Hellas out to choppy seas.

History
- Name: Cosco Hellas
- Owner: Caravokyra Maritime Corp
- Operator: Costamare Shipping Co SA
- Port of registry: Valletta, Malta
- Builder: Hyundai Heavy Industries
- Yard number: 1654
- Completed: July 2006
- Identification: IMO number: 9308510; MMSI number: 241459000; Callsign: SVCL9
- Status: In service

General characteristics
- Class & type: (A33A2CC) container ship (Fully Cellular)
- Tonnage: 109,149 gross register tons
- Length: 350.0 m (1,148.3 ft)/1,148.3 ft
- Beam: 42.8 m (140 ft)/140 ft
- Depth: 27.30
- Installed power: 74760 kW
- Propulsion: 1 FP propeller
- Speed: 25.4 knots (47.0 km/h; 29.2 mph)
- Capacity: 9,450 TEU

Cosco Hellas is a container ship owned by Caravokyra Maritime Corp and operated by Costamare Shipping. Its port of registry is Valletta, Malta. Cosco Hellas is a sister ship of the COSCO Beijing. Cosco Hellas has three other sisters: Cosco Ningbo, Cosco Yantian and Cosco Guangzhou. Greek Prime Minister Costas Karamanlis said on July 28, 2006, during the christening ceremony for the Chinese-leased container ship in Piraeus, that the Cosco Hellas emphasized the close bonds of friendship between the Greek and Chinese peoples in the best possible way.

On July 11, 2006, Wei Jiafu, captain of Cosco Hellas, attended China Maritime Day at the port of Shanghai. The purpose of the celebration was to honour the ten distinguished leaders in Chinese maritime industry. The event was mastered by the Vice-Minister of the Ministry of Communications of China, Xu Zuyuan.

On June 3, 2025, Cosco Hellas rescued the 22 crew members of the Morning Midas, a roll-on/roll-off ship that caught fire 300 miles south of Adak Island in the Aleutian Islands.

== Hull and engine ==
The Cosco Hellas has a length of 350 m and a beam of 43 m. It was built by Hyundai Heavy Industries in Ulsan, South Korea. It is a fully cellular container ship with a capacity of 9469 TEU, including 700 refrigerated containers. The dimensions of the Cosco Hellas are just small enough to allow to sail through the Westerschelde slaloms near Antwerp.

The Cosco Hellas is powered by a MAN-B&W 12K98MC, a 2 stroke 12 cylinder engine, capable of producing 74,760 kW. This engine drives a single fixed prop propeller that can sustain a speed of 25 kt.
