= Space Pioneer =

Chinese aerospace company

Beijing Tianbing Technology Co., Ltd.
- Trade name: Space Pioneer
- Native name: 北京天兵科技有限公司
- Type: Private
- Industry: Aerospace
- Founded: 2019; 7 years ago
- Founder: Kang Yonglai
- Headquarters: Beijing, China
- Website: www.spacepioneer.cc

Space Pioneer (Chinese: 天兵科技), also known as Beijing Tianbing Technology Co., Ltd., is a Chinese aerospace company developing reusable orbital rocket technology—both launch vehicles and liquid rocket engines—to access the market for low-cost space launch services. The company is aiming to meet launch requirements for both the Chinese national satellite internet project and also the CNSA solicitation for resupply of the Tiangong space station.

The stated mission of Space Pioneer is to "pursue new breakthroughs in technology and performance, [and] to select a technological path based on the needs of the commercial market to improve launch efficiency and reduce launch costs."

== History ==
Space Pioneer was founded in 2019 by Kang Yonglai. Kang was the former CTO of LandSpace until 2019, when he left to establish Space Pioneer.

The company completed two funding rounds in 2019, including a Zhejiang University (ZJU) Joint Innovation investment, to continue liquid bipropellant engine development of the Tianhuo series of rocket engines.

In April 2020, the company raised US$14 million in order to complete development of its 30 tf (66,000 lbf) liquid rocket engine Tianhuo-3, which had begun igniter hot fire tests in 2019. This was followed in September with a "multiple hundreds of millions of yuan" Series A capital raise.

In July 2021, the company secured US$30 million venture capital funding in a pre-B funding round. The funds were used to complete initial development of the Tianlong-1 reusable launch vehicle, a kerolox-propellant vehicle with a payload capacity to orbit exceeding 3 tonnes (6,600 lb), during 2021–22.

In April 2023 the first launch of Tianlong-2 was successful.

In July 2023, Space Pioneer announced that it had raised hundreds of millions of yuan in C-round funding, bringing the total amount raised to around US$414 million. The funds will be used for the development of the Tianlong-3 reusable launch vehicle.

== Technology ==
Space Pioneer is developing reusable spaceflight technology rather than the traditional expendable rocket technology. Both launch vehicles and liquid rocket engines are being designed for reuse.

=== Tianlong-1 ===
Tianlong-1 is a kerosene-liquid oxygen (kerolox) fueled vehicle using the Tianhuo-3 engine, with a payload capacity to low Earth orbit exceeding 3 tonnes (6,600 lb).

=== Tianlong-2 ===
Tianlong-2, another launch vehicle designed by the company, entered service in early 2023. It is 32.8m tall, and it can lift up to 2t to LEO and 1.5t to 500km SSO. The maiden flight of Tianlong-2 took place on 2 April 2023, successfully carrying the Jinta cubesat from Hunan Hangsheng Satellite Technology to a Sun-synchronous orbit. This mission represented the first successful launch of a Chinese privately funded, liquid-fueled, kerolox rocket with Space Pioneer becoming the first startup company to reach orbit on its maiden attempt.

=== Tianlong-3 ===
Tianlong-3 is a two-stage kerolox launch vehicle with a reusable first stage that is currently under development. It is designed to lift about 17t to LEO and 14t to 500km SSO, comparable to SpaceX's Falcon 9 launch vehicle. As of November 2023, the first launch was scheduled for June 2024, with two more launches planned before the end of 2024.

On 30 June 2024, a Tianlong-3 first stage rocket detached from its stand during a static fire test due to a structural failure, resulting in an unintentional launch. The rocket landed and exploded in the mountains 1.5 kilometres (0.9 mi) southwest of the test site in Gongyi, China, and no casualties were reported.

On 15 September 2025, Space Pioneer successfully static fired the first stage of Tianlong 3. More than a year after the unsuccessful June 2024 static fire, Space Pioneer has implemented 127 corrective measures, including doubling the amount of hold down arms. The test was performed on the HOS-1 sea launch platform of Haiyang Space Port, likely to prevent any potential danger to civilians were the first stage to detach again. Prior to the static fire, the nine engines performed gimballing tests. In total, the static fire lasted for approximately 30 seconds. The black smoke at the end can be attributed to excess kerosene at engine shutoff.

Space Pioneer is targeting October to put Tianlong 3 on the pad at Jiuquan Satellite Launch Center. The launch will later be conducted in November or December.

=== Engines ===
Space Pioneer's engine series are designated as Tianhuo (Sky Fire). Early concepts include Tianhuo-1 (TH-1), the initial Space Pioneer rocket engine, with hot-fire ground testing completed before 2020. Tianhuo-2 (TH-2) was developed subsequent to Tianhuo-1, with the first hot fire test of the engine in early 2020. Tianhuo-3 (TH-3) is a kerolox liquid-bipropellant rocket engine with 30 tonnes-force (66,000 lbf) of thrust. It is intended to be the main engine for the Tianlong-1 launch vehicle. The engine had its first hot-fire test in December 2020, with a 50-second duration ground test run.

Space Pioneer later re-designated TH-3 as TH-11, which successfully powered the second stage of the Tianlong-2 rocket. A larger, 100 tonnes-force (220,000 lbf) class TH-12 engine is in development for its upcoming Tianlong-3 launch vehicle.

== Launches ==
Rocket & Serial	Date	Payload	Orbit	Launch site	Outcome	Notes
Tianlong-2	2 April 2023, 08:48 UTC	Ai Taikong Kexue ("love space science")	SSO	Jiuquan	Success	First Chinese private launch firm to achieve orbit with a liquid propellant rocket, the first company in the world to reach orbit on its first attempt using a fully liquid fueled rocket.
Tianlong-3 (first stage)	30 June 2024	None	Suborbital	Gongyi	Unintentional Launch	Failure of hold-down clamps during planned static fire test resulting in suborbital flight and loss of vehicle.
Tianlong-3	3 April 2026, 04:17	None, demo flight	SSO	Wenchang	Failure	First intentional flight of Tianlong-3. Failure during first stage. Booster recovery was not attempted.
Tianlong-3	2026		SSO	Wenchang	Planned	

== See also ==
- i-Space, a competitive Chinese private launch company using solid rocket engine technology
- OneSpace, a Chinese company competitor
