= Tianlong-2 =

Orbital launch vehicle by Space Pioneer

- Function: Small-lift launch vehicle
- Manufacturer: Space Pioneer
- Country of origin: China

Size
- Height: 32.8 m (108 ft)
- Diameter: 3.35 m (11.0 ft)
- Mass: 153,000 kg (337,000 lb)
- Stages: 3

Capacity

Payload to LEO
- Mass: 2,000 kg (4,400 lb)

Payload to SSO (500 km)
- Mass: 1,500 kg (3,300 lb)

Associated rockets
- Family: Tianlong
- Comparable: Kinetica 1

Launch history
- Status: Active
- Launch sites: Jiuquan LS-120
- Total launches: 1
- Success(es): 1
- First flight: 2 April 2023

First stage
- Powered by: 3 × YF-102
- Maximum thrust: 2,505 kN (563,000 lb_{f})
- Specific impulse: 275.3 s (2.700 km/s)
- Propellant: RP-1/LOX

Second stage
- Powered by: 1 × TH-11V
- Maximum thrust: 300 kN (67,000 lb_{f})
- Specific impulse: 340.6s
- Propellant: RP-1/LOX

Third stage
- Powered by: 1 × TH-31
- Propellant: N_{2}O_{4} / MMH

The Tianlong-2 (simplified Chinese: 天龙二号; traditional Chinese: 天龍二號; pinyin: Tiānlóng Èrhào; lit. 'Heavenly Dragon 2') is a small-lift launch vehicle developed by Space Pioneer, a private Chinese aerospace company. The rocket is a three-stage design that uses liquid oxygen and kerosene as propellants for the first two stages. Its initial low-Earth orbit capacity is 2 tons, which can be increased to 4 tons after future improvements.

Tianlong-2 successfully completed its maiden flight on April 2, 2023. It is China's first liquid rocket developed by a private enterprise and successfully put into orbit.

== Launches ==
Flight number	Date (UTC)	Payload	Orbit	Launch site	Outcome
Tianlong-2 Y1	2 April 2023, 08:48	Jinta (Ai Taikong Kexue)	SSO	Jiuquan LS-120	Success
