= COSCO Glory =

Container ship

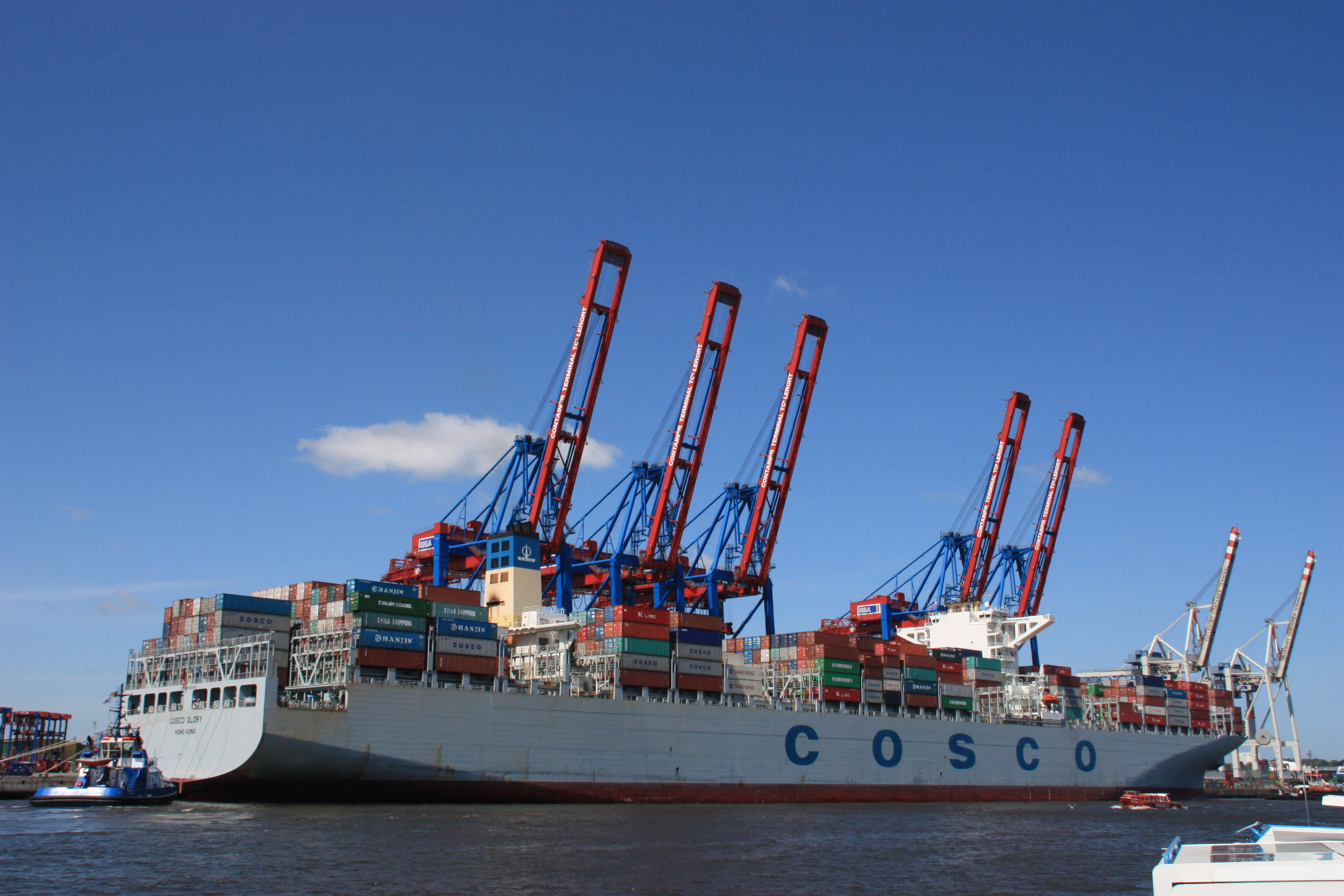
- COSCO Glory

History
- Name: COSCO Glory
- Owner: Seaspan Container Line
- Port of registry: Hong Kong, China
- Builder: Hyundai Heavy Industries Co Ltd
- Launched: 22 April 2011
- Completed: 2011
- Identification: Call sign: VRIR7; IMO number: 9466245; MMSI number: 477795300
- Status: In service

General characteristics
- Class & type: COSCO Glory-class container ship
- Tonnage: 141,823 GT; 140,637 DWT
- Length: 366m
- Beam: 48m
- Draft: 15.5m
- Installed power: 68,840 kW
- Speed: 24.6 kn
- Capacity: 13092 TEU

COSCO Glory is a container ship. She was built in 2011 by Hyundai Heavy Industries of South Korea and is owned by Seaspan and as of 2025 was listed on the Seaspan Web site as chartered to Cosco.

Cosco Glory was initially deployed on the NE3 service, travelling from Asia to Europe and back once a week. On this service, the sequence of ports visited is Rotterdam, Felixstowe, Hamburg, Antwerp, Guangzhou, Hong Kong, Xingang, Dalian, Qingdao, Ningbo, Yantian, and Singapore. The Cosco Glory is an ungeared, post-Panamax vessel.

== Sister ships ==
- Cosco Development
- Cosco Excellence
- Cosco Faith
- Cosco Fortune
- Cosco Harmony
- Cosco Hope
- Cosco Pride
