= Demi-Gods and Semi-Devils (disambiguation) =

Demi-Gods and Semi-Devils may refer to:

- Demi-Gods and Semi-Devils, known as Tian Long Ba Bu (or Tianlong Babu) in Chinese, is a novel by Jin Yong. The characters in the novel are based on the Eight Races of non-human entities in Buddhist cosmology, who are collectively known in Chinese as the "Tian Long Ba Bu" or "Long Shen Ba Bu".
- Films adapted from the novel:
  - The Battle Wizard, a 1977 Hong Kong film
  - Demi-Gods and Semi-Devils (1982 film), a 1982 Hong Kong film
  - The Dragon Chronicles – The Maidens, a 1994 Hong Kong film
- Television series adapted from the novel:
  - Demi-Gods and Semi-Devils (1982 TV series), a 1982 Hong Kong television series
  - Demi-Gods and Semi-Devils (1990 TV series), a 1990 Taiwan television series
  - Demi-Gods and Semi-Devils (1997 TV series), a 1997 Hong Kong television series
  - Demi-Gods and Semi-Devils (2003 TV series), a 2003 Chinese television series
  - Demi-Gods and Semi-Devils (2013 TV series), a 2013 Chinese television series
- Video games based on the novel:
  - Dragon Oath, also known as TLBB in China, a Chinese MMORPG
