= Juzhi Yizhi =

Jùzhī Yīzhǐ (Chinese: 俱胝一指; Japanese: Gutei Isshi) was a 9th-century Chinese Chán, or Zen, master. After Bodhidharma, he was the eleventh successor in the line of Nányuè Huáiràng (677–744) and Mǎzǔ Dàoyī (709–788), as well as—according to some sources—Línjì Yìxuán (although according to others he was Linji's contemporary). He was the student of Hángzhōu Tiānlóng (Kōshū Tenryū).

== Enlightenment ==
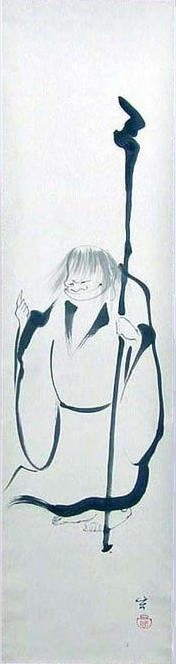
"I attained my finger-Zen from my teacher Tenryu, and in my whole life I could not exhaust it."

Gutei spent his time alone in the mountains, meditating and chanting the Kannongyō, the twenty-fifth chapter of the Lotus Sutra. One day, he was visited by a young nun who lived nearby. The nun challenged Gutei to utter a word of Zen, but—when he proved unable to do so—she left. Having spent so much time in meditation and study, Gutei became dismayed at his inability to say a single word of Zen to the nun.

Shortly afterwards, Tenryū paid Gutei a visit. Gutei realized that his inability to answer the nun was due to his lack of understanding, and asked Tenryū to teach him. Tenryū held up his finger, and at that moment Gutei was enlightened.

Versions of this story are told by Taisen Deshimaru and Susan Ji-on Postal.

== Gutei's Finger ==
Gutei is famous for the following story, which appears as a kōan in various collections. The version here ("Gutei's Finger") is from the Mumonkan, in the translation by Nyogen Senzaki and Paul Reps.

Gutei raised his finger whenever he was asked a question about Zen. A boy attendant began to imitate him in this way. When anyone asked the boy what his master had preached about, the boy would raise his finger.

Gutei heard about the boy's mischief. He seized him and cut off his finger. The boy cried and ran away. Gutei called and stopped him. When the boy turned his head to Gutei, Gutei raised up his own finger. In that instant the boy was enlightened.

When Gutei was about to pass from this world he gathered his monks around him. "I attained my finger-Zen," he said, "from my teacher Tenryū, and in my whole life I could not exhaust it." Then he passed away.

Mumon's comment: Enlightenment, which Gutei and the boy attained, has nothing to do with a finger. If anyone clings to a finger, Tenryū will be so disappointed that he will annihilate Gutei, the boy and the clinger all together.

Gutei cheapens the teaching of Tenryū,
Emancipating the boy with a knife.
Compared to the Chinese god who pushed aside a mountain with one hand
Old Gutei is a poor imitator.

It is due to this story that Gutei has commonly become known as Gutei Isshi, meaning "Gutei One-finger".

== See also ==
- Zen
- Bodhidharma
- Nangaku
- Rinzai
- Lineage (Buddhism)
- Mumonkan
- Blue Cliff Record
- New Orleans Zen Temple
