= TL-30 =

Chinese anti-radiation missile

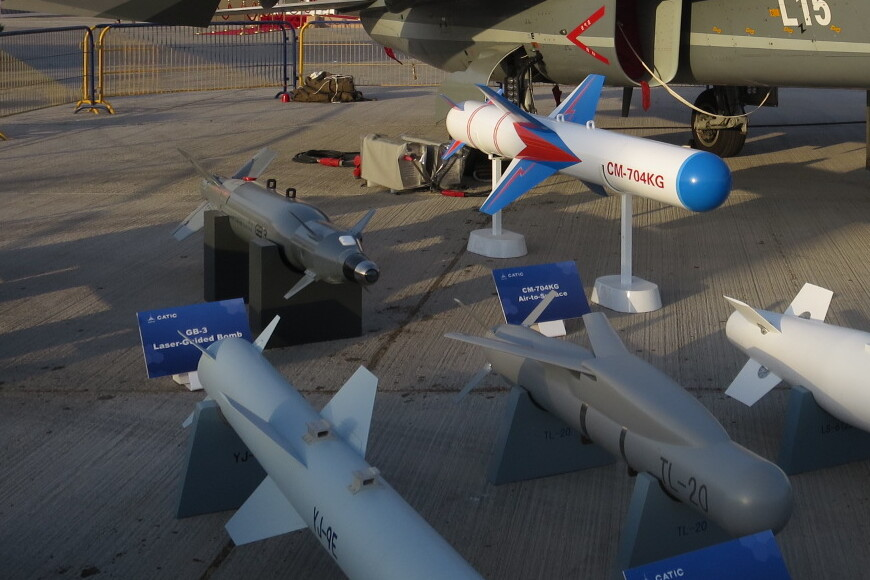
TL-20 guided bomb (bottom-right) in a display of Hongdu L-15 aircraft

The TL-30 (Tianlong-30; Chinese: 天龙-30) is an anti-radiation loitering missile built by Hongdu Aviation Industry Corporation.

At Zhuhai Airshow 2022, AVIC showcased the TL-30 anti-radiation loitering missile. The TL-30A, the air-launched variant, is fitted with a fold-out wing, powered by a turbojet engine, and has a range of 280 km (170 mi). Multiple options of the seeker are available. The vehicle-mounted variant is designated TL-30B, and the ship-launched version is designated TL-30C. The weapon is 3.7 m (12 ft) long, weighs 270 kg (600 lb), features SINS, GNSS, and anti-radiation seeker head. The missile has a loitering time of 50 minutes. During the loitering mode, the missile can appear as an aircraft to deceive enemy turning on radar, serves as a decoy to protect friendly aircraft, or transmit target information to friendly units.

The TL-20 is a small-diameter air-to-surface munition developed by Hongdu. It can be fitted inside Chengdu J-20 or on the light attack aircraft such as Hongdu L-15.
