= Tianlong Hotel =

Planned building in Chongqing, China

- 天龍大酒店

General information
- Status: Proposed
- Type: Hotel
- Architectural style: Modernism
- Location: Chongqing, China

Height
- Roof: 330 m (1,080 ft)

Technical details
- Floor count: 73
- Floor area: 178,000 m^{2} (1,920,000 sq ft)

Tianlong Hotel is a cancelled 330 m (1,080 ft) hotel skyscraper which was planned to have 73 storeys, in the Nanan District of Chongqing, China.
