= Yunyao-1 =

Chinese commercial satellite system

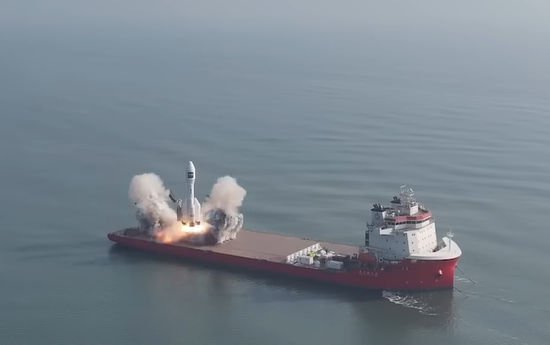

Program overview
- Country: People's Republic of China
- Organization: CGSTL
- Purpose: Commercial Meteorology
- Status: Active

Program history
- Duration: 2024–present
- First flight: 11 January 2024
- Successes: 34
- Failures: 9
- Launch sites: JSLC; Dong Fang Hang Tian Gang

Vehicle information
- Launch vehicles: Gravity-1; Ceres-1; Kinetica 1; Hyperbola-1

Yunyao-1 is a chinese commercial Meteorology satellite system. The satellites are operated by CGSTL. The first pair of three satellites were launched on a Gravity-1 rocket from Dong Fang Hang Tian Gang Barge, Yellow Sea on 11 January 2023. All launched Yunyao-1 satellites are in Sun-synchronous orbit (SSO).

== List of satellites ==
| Satellite | Launch (UTC) | Function | COSPAR ID | Launcher | Launch site | Status |
|---|---|---|---|---|---|---|
| Yunyao-1 18 (Lianxin Yingda 1) | 11 January 2024 | | | Gravity-1 | Dong Fang Hang Tian Gang Barge, Yellow Sea | Operational |
| Yunyao-1 19 (Sanxia Yaogan 1) | 11 January 2024 | | | Gravity-1 | Dong Fang Hang Tian Gang Barge, Yellow Sea | Operational |
| Yunyao-1 20 (Langfang Kongjian 1) | 11 January 2024 | | | Gravity-1 | Dong Fang Hang Tian Gang Barge, Yellow Sea | Operational |
| Yunyao-1 14 (Hebei Linxi 1) | 30 May 2024 | | | Ceres-1 | JSLC | Operational |
| Yunyao-1 25 (Zhangjiang Gaoke) | 30 May 2024 | | | Ceres-1 | JSLC | Operational |
| Yunyao-1 26 (Nishuihan 2) | 30 May 2024 | | | Ceres-1 | JSLC | Operational |
| Yunyao-1 (Beiyang Haitang Jijin 1) | 10 July 2024 | | | Hyperbola-1 | JSLC | Launch failure |
| Yunyao-1 (Tianjin Daxue Kejiyuan 1) | 10 July 2024 | | | Hyperbola-1 | JSLC | Launch failure |
| Yunyao-1 (Chuangye Zhibenshe 1) | 10 July 2024 | | | Hyperbola-1 | JSLC | Launch Failure |
| Yunyao-1 15 | 29 August 2024 | | | Ceres-1S | Dong Fang Hang Tian Gang Barge, Yellow Sea | Operational |
| Yunyao-1 16 | 29 August 2024 | | | Ceres-1S | Dong Fang Hang Tian Gang Barge, Yellow Sea | Operational |
| Yunyao-1 17 | 29 August 2024 | | | Ceres-1S | Dong Fang Hang Tian Gang Barge, Yellow Sea | Operational |
| Yunyao-1 21 (Tianjin Daxue Xuanhuai Xueyuan) | 24 September 2024 | | | Kinetica 1 | JSLC | Operational |
| Yunyao-1 22 | 24 September 2024 | | | Kinetica 1 | JSLC | Operational |
| Yunyao-1 31 | 11 November 2024 | | | Kinetica 1 | JSLC | Operational |
| Yunyao-1 32 (Qinghua Dixue) | 11 November 2024 | | | Kinetica 1 | JSLC | Operational |
| Yunyao-1 33 | 11 November 2024 | | | Kinetica 1 | JSLC | Operational |
| Yunyao-1 34 | 11 November 2024 | | | Kinetica 1 | JSLC | Operational |
| Yunyao-1 35 | 11 November 2024 | | | Kinetica 1 | JSLC | Operational |
| Yunyao-1 36 | 11 November 2024 | | | Kinetica 1 | JSLC | Operational |
| Yunyao-1 | 27 December 2024 | | | Kinetica 1 | JSLC | Launch failure |
| Yunyao-1 | 27 December 2024 | | | Kinetica 1 | JSLC | Launch failure |
| Yunyao-1 | 27 December 2024 | | | Kinetica 1 | JSLC | Launch failure |
| Yunyao-1 | 27 December 2024 | | | Kinetica 1 | JSLC | Launch failure |
| Yunyao-1 | 27 December 2024 | | | Kinetica 1 | JSLC | Launch failure |
| Yunyao-1 | 27 December 2024 | | | Kinetica 1 | JSLC | Launch failure |
| Yunyao-1 37 | 20 January 2025 | | | Ceres-1 | JSLC | Operational |
| Yunyao-1 38 | 20 January 2025 | | | Ceres-1 | JSLC | Operational |
| Yunyao-1 39 | 20 January 2025 | | | Ceres-1 | JSLC | Operational |
| Yunyao-1 40 | 20 January 2025 | | | Ceres-1 | JSLC | Operational |
| Yunyao-1 55 | 17 March 2025 | | | Ceres-1 | JSLC | Operational |
| Yunyao-1 56 | 17 March 2025 | | | Ceres-1 | JSLC | Operational |
| Yunyao-1 57 | 17 March 2025 | | | Ceres-1 | JSLC | Operational |
| Yunyao-1 58 | 17 March 2025 | | | Ceres-1 | JSLC | Operational |
| Yunyao-1 59 | 17 March 2025 | | | Ceres-1 | JSLC | Operational |
| Yunyao-1 60 | 17 March 2025 | | | Ceres-1 | JSLC | Operational |
| Yunyao-1 43 | 21 March 2025 | | | Ceres-1 | JSLC | Operational |
| Yunyao-1 44 | 21 March 2025 | | | Ceres-1 | JSLC | Operational |
| Yunyao-1 45 | 21 March 2025 | | | Ceres-1 | JSLC | Operational |
| Yunyao-1 46 | 21 March 2025 | | | Ceres-1 | JSLC | Operational |
| Yunyao-1 47 | 21 March 2025 | | | Ceres-1 | JSLC | Operational |
| Yunyao-1 48 | 21 March 2025 | | | Ceres-1 | JSLC | Operational |
| Yunyao-1 27 | 5 September 2025 | | | Ceres-1 | JSLC | Operational |

== See also ==
- Jilin-1
