= X-bow =

X-Bow may refer to:

- KTM X-Bow, an Austrian make of car
- X-bow (shipbuilding), a design of ship's bow
- Crossbow
- X-Bow Systems, a space company from New Mexico
