= Jilin-1 =

Chinese commercial satellite system

- 吉林一号
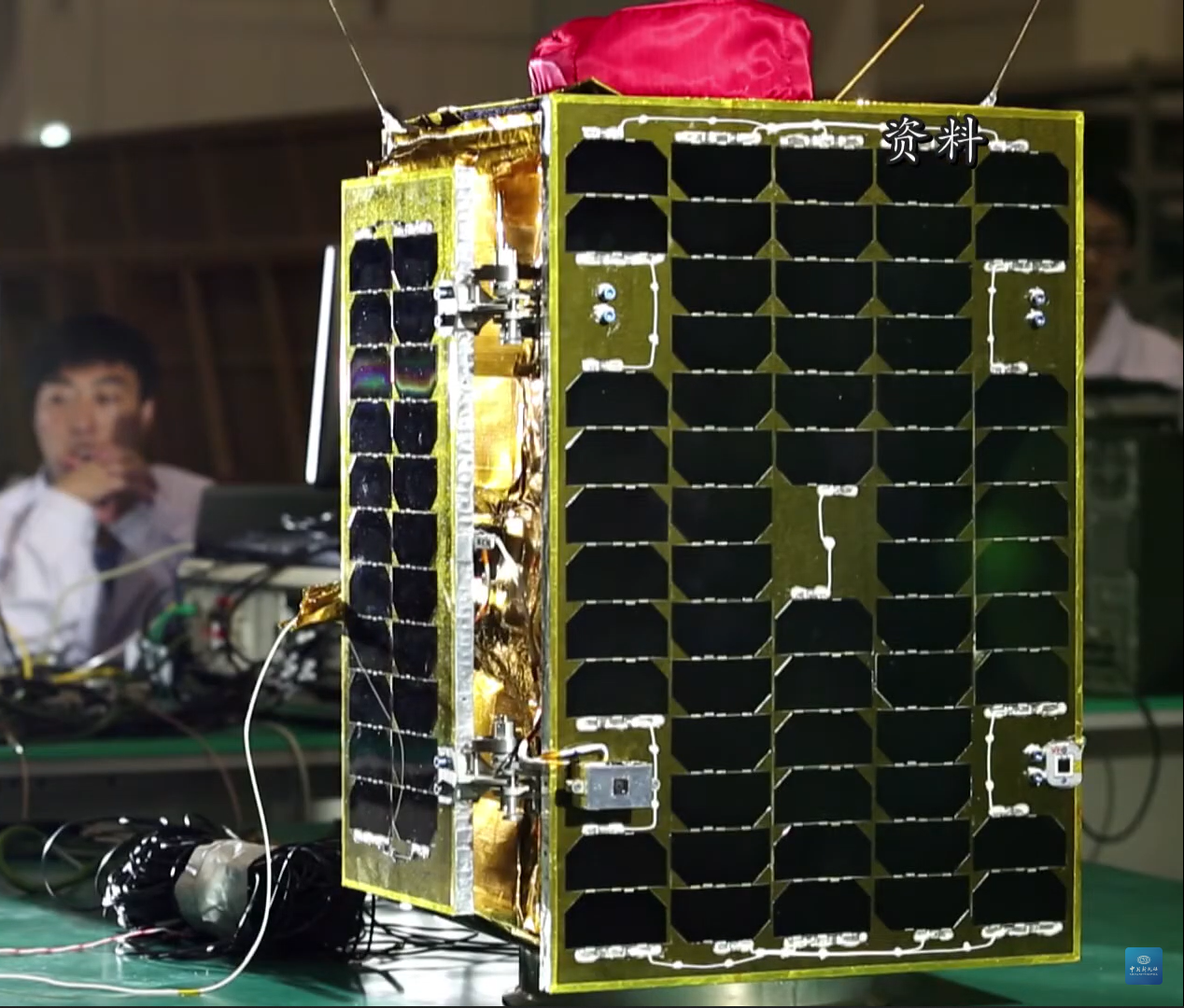

Program overview
- Country: People's Republic of China
- Organization: Chang Guang Satellite Technology Company
- Purpose: Commercial earth observation
- Status: Active

Program history
- Duration: 2015–present
- First flight: 7 October 2015
- Successes: 130
- Failures: 4
- Launch sites: JSLC; TSLC; Tai Rui Barge

Vehicle information
- Launch vehicles: CZ-2D; KZ-1A; CZ-6; CZ-8; CZ-11; KZ-11; SQX-1; Ceres-1; SD-3

Jilin-1 (simplified Chinese: 吉林一号; traditional Chinese: 吉林一號; pinyin: Jí Lín Yī Hào) is China's first self-developed commercial remote sensing satellite system. The satellites are operated by Chang Guang Satellite Technology Corporation and named after Jilin Province where the company is headquartered. The first set of satellites were launched by Long March 2D in Jiuquan Satellite Launch Center on 7 October 2015, at 04:13 UTC. All launched Jilin-1 satellites are in Sun-synchronous orbit (SSO).

As of 15 June 2023, there were a total of 25 launches of Jilin-1, and 130 satellites in orbit. Chang Guang originally planned to launch 138 total satellites by the year 2025, but expanded its goal in 2022 to 300 satellites Jilin-1 is the largest Chinese commercial satellite constellation in orbit and has enjoyed generous funding since the Chinese government opened satellite imagery to private ventures. Chang Guang received $375 million (USD) of funding for the Jilin-1 program in November 2020.

== Satellites ==
=== Video satellites ===
The Jilin-1 series of satellites includes eight 'Jilin-1 Smart Video Satellites' also written as 'Shipin' (Chinese: 视频; pinyin: shìpín; lit. 'video'). First launched in the Jilin-1 series' inaugural 2015 launch, eight Jilin-1 smart video satellites provide 4K high definition (HD) Earth observation color video imagery from Sun-synchronous orbit (SSO) with a revisit time of 3.3 days, and a five-year system life expectancy. The reported applications of these smart video satellites range from disaster response and economic monitoring to military and national intelligence collection. These satellites use a gaze imaging pattern, use three-axis stabilization, record full-color video between 437–720 nanometers (using a Bayer filter), weigh between 225–235 kilograms, and are 1230x642x2104 millimeters in size.

Three separate generations of Jilin-1 smart video satellites have been designed and launched with the first generation (01 and 02) launched on 7 October 2015, the second generation (one satellite, 03) launched on 9 January 2017, and the third generation (04–08) launched on both 21 November 2017 and 19 January 2018. Satellites of the second generation of Jilin-1 smart video constellation feature updates to orbital propulsion, computer, power supply, and data transmission systems, based on feedback from first-generation users. It is unclear which upgrades took place between the second and third generations.

Jilin-1 video satellites have been used for supervising the 2013–2017 construction of Saparmurat Turkmenbashy Olympic Stadium in Turkmenistan, recording taxiing aircraft at Hartsfield-Jackson Atlanta International Airport, monitoring forest fire spread along the Sino-Russian border, and recording the launch of a OneSpace suborbital rocket. Jilin-1 drew domestic and international attention after Chang Guang released video from a Jilin-1 smart video satellite purporting to show a traveling Lockheed Martin F-22 Raptor of the United States Air Force.

=== Spectrum satellites ===
The Jilin-1 satellite program also operates two hyperspectral imaging (HSI) satellites named Spectrum-01 (光谱01; Guāngpǔ-01) and Spectrum-02 (光谱02; Guāngpǔ-02). Onboard payloads of Spectrum satellites image light from a wavelength of 450 nanometers (visible blue) to 135 micrometers (long-wave infrared) across 26 separate bands. The two Spectrum satellites orbit 528 kilometers above the Earth in a Sun-synchronous orbit which enables the satellites to image with a consistent geometric relationship with the Sun and have a 2-3 day revisit time recording images in 5 meter resolution for visible and near-infrared (NIR), 100 meter resolution for short and medium-wave infrared (SWIR, MWIR), and 150 meter resolution for long-wave infrared (LWIR).

Spectrum 01, also known as 'Jilin Lincao 1' (Chinese: 吉林林草一号; pinyin: Lín cǎo yī hào; lit. 'forest grass 1'), was built with the cooperation of China's forestry system which uses the satellite to analyze the distribution of tree species in forests, detection of forest fires, the identification of diseases and pests, and tracking of the nation's severe desertification. Spectrum 02, also known as 'Wenchang Supercomputer 1' (Chinese: 文昌超算一号; pinyin: Wénchāng chāo suàn yī hào) was jointly invested and developed with the Wenchang Aerospace Supercomputing Center, part of the Wenchang International Aerospace City in Hainan Province and is primarily focused on marine ecological monitoring with additional functions in ocean search and rescue and undersea resource exploration.

=== High-resolution satellites ===
The most prevalent satellite series in the Jilin-1 program is the 'high resolution' (高分; Gāo fēn) series with sixty-three launched since June 2019. Despite sharing the name, these satellites have no relation with and are not to be confused with the better known Gaofen dual-use (military and civilian) satellite program. Jilin-1 Gaofen satellites carry both a panchromatic and multispectral imager.

=== Wideband satellites ===
The Jilin-1 Wideband (宽幅; Kuān fú; 'wide') constellation at the moment consists in two generations of satellites. The first one, Kuanfu-01, features a high resolution and wide-field-of-view telephoto range imager providing a multi-spectral resolution better than 4 m and a swath width greater than 136 km, and high-speed storage and high-speed digital transmission systems. Three satellites of this generation have been launched, all onboard Long March 2D rockets, between January 2020 and May 2022. The second generation satellites, while being significantly lighter (down to 230 kg from the 1200 kg of the first generation) offers improved performances with a 0.5 m resolution and a 150 km swath width. Only one satellite has been launched so far.

=== Other satellites ===
Other satellites of the Jilin-1 program include a single LQSat verification satellite, the Optical-A (光学; Guāngxué; 'optical') satellite, sixty-one high-resolution panchromatic (PAN) and multispectral imaging (MSI) satellites (not to be confused with the separate Gaofen program), and one successfully launched imaging satellite (魔方; Mófāng; 'magic cube' or 'Rubik's Cube').

== List of satellites ==
Satellite	Launch (UTC)	Function	COSPAR ID	Launcher	Launch site	Status
Jilin-1 LQSat	7 October 2015, 04:13	Electro-optical	2015-057A	Long March 2D	JSLC	Operational
Jilin-1 Video-01	7 October 2015, 04:13	1.3m color video	2015-057B	Long March 2D	JSLC	Operational
Jilin-1 Video-02	7 October 2015, 04:13	1.3m color video	2015-057C	Long March 2D	JSLC	Operational
Jilin-1 Optical-A	7 October 2015, 04:13	0.72m PAN, 4m MSI	2015-057D	Long March 2D	JSLC	Operational
Jilin-1 Video-03	9 January 2017, 04:11	0.92m color video	2017-002B	Kuaizhou-1A	JSLC	Operational
Jilin-1 Video-04	21 November 2017, 04:50	1m color video	2017-074A	Long March 6	TSLC	Operational
Jilin-1 Video-05	21 November 2017, 04:50	1m color video	2017-074B	Long March 6	TSLC	Operational
Jilin-1 Video-06	21 November 2017, 04:50	1m color video	2017-074C	Long March 6	TSLC	Operational
Jilin-1 Video-07	19 January 2018, 04:12	1m color video	2018-008E	Long March 11	JSLC	Operational
Jilin-1 Video-08	19 January 2018, 04:12	1m color video	2018-008F	Long March 11	JSLC	Operational
Jilin-1 Spectrum-01	21 January 2019, 05:42	5m 26-band HSI	2019-005B	Long March 11	JSLC	Operational
Jilin-1 Spectrum-02	21 January 2019, 05:42	5m 26-band HSI	2019-005E	Long March 11	JSLC	Operational
Jilin-1 Gaofen-03A	5 June 2019, 04:06	1.06m PAN, 4.24m 4-band MSI	2019-032E	Long March 11	Tai Rui	Operational
Jilin-1 Gaofen-02A	13 November 2019, 03:40	0.75m PAN, 3m 4-band MSI	2019-075A	Kuaizhou-1A	JSLC	Operational
Jilin-1 Gaofen-02B	7 December 2019, 02:55	0.75m PAN, 3m 4-band MSI	2019-086A	Kuaizhou-1A	TSLC	Operational
Jilin-1 Kuanfu-01	15 January 2020, 02:53	0.5m PAN, 2m 4-band MSI	2020-003A	Long March 2D	TSLC	Operational
Jilin-1 Gaofen-02E	10 July 2020, 04:17	0.75m PAN, 3m MSI	Failure	Kuaizhou 11	JSLC	Launch failed
Jilin-1 Gaofen-02C	12 September 2020, 05:02	0.75m PAN, 3m MSI	Failure	Kuaizhou 1A	JSLC	Launch failed
Jilin-1 Gaofen-03B-01	15 September 2020, 01:23	1m PAN, 4m MSI, 1.2m color video	2020-065A	Long March 11	De Bo-3	Operational
Jilin-1 Gaofen-03B-02	15 September 2020, 01:23	1m PAN, 4m MSI, 1.2m color video	2020-065B	Long March 11	De Bo-3	Operational
Jilin-1 Gaofen-03B-03	15 September 2020, 01:23	1m PAN, 4m MSI, 1.2m color video	2020-065C	Long March 11	De Bo-3	Operational
Jilin-1 Gaofen-03B-04	15 September 2020, 01:23	1m PAN, 4m MSI, 1.2m color video	2020-065D	Long March 11	De Bo-3	Operational
Jilin-1 Gaofen-03B-05	15 September 2020, 01:23	1m PAN, 4m MSI, 1.2m color video	2020-065E	Long March 11	De Bo-3	Operational
Jilin-1 Gaofen-03B-06	15 September 2020, 01:23	1m PAN, 4m MSI, 1.2m color video	2020-065F	Long March 11	De Bo-3	Operational
Jilin-1 Gaofen-03C-01	15 September 2020, 01:23	1m PAN, 4m MSI, 1.2m color video	2020-065G	Long March 11	De Bo-3	Operational
Jilin-1 Gaofen-03C-02	15 September 2020, 01:23	1m PAN, 4m MSI, 1.2m color video	2020-065H	Long March 11	De Bo-3	Operational
Jilin-1 Gaofen-03C-03	15 September 2020, 01:23	1m PAN, 4m MSI, 1.2m color video	2020-065J	Long March 11	De Bo-3	Operational
Jilin-1 Kuanfu-01B	3 July 2021, 02:51	0.75m PAN, 4-band MSI	2021-061_	Long March 2D	TSLC	Operational
Jilin-1 Gaofen-03D01	3 July 2021, 02:51	0.75m PAN, 4-band MSI	2021-061_	Long March 2D	TSLC	Operational
Jilin-1 Gaofen-03D02	3 July 2021, 02:51	0.75m PAN, 4-band MSI	2021-061_	Long March 2D	TSLC	Operational
Jilin-1 Gaofen-03D03	3 July 2021, 02:51	0.75m PAN, 4-band MSI	2021-061_	Long March 2D	TSLC	Operational
Jilin-1 Mofang-01A	3 August 2021, 07:39	Electro-optical	Failure	Hyperbola-1	JSLC	Launch failed
Jilin-1 Gaofen-02D	27 September 2021, 06:19	0.75m PAN, 3m MSI	2021-086A	Kuaizhou 1A	JSLC	Operational
Jilin-1 Gaofen-02F	27 October 2021, 06:19	0.75m PAN, 3m MSI	2021-097A	Kuaizhou 1A	JSLC	Operational
Jilin-1 Gaofen-03D-10	27 February 2022, 03:06	0.75m PAN, 4-band MSI	2022-019_	Long March 8	WSLS	Operational
Jilin-1 Gaofen-03D-11	27 February 2022, 03:06	0.75m PAN, 4-band MSI	2022-019_	Long March 8	WSLS	Operational
Jilin-1 Gaofen-03D-12	27 February 2022, 03:06	0.75m PAN, 4-band MSI	2022-019_	Long March 8	WSLS	Operational
Jilin-1 Gaofen-03D-13	27 February 2022, 03:06	0.75m PAN, 4-band MSI	2022-019_	Long March 8	WSLS	Operational
Jilin-1 Gaofen-03D-14	27 February 2022, 03:06	0.75m PAN, 4-band MSI	2022-019_	Long March 8	WSLS	Operational
Jilin-1 Gaofen-03D-15	27 February 2022, 03:06	0.75m PAN, 4-band MSI	2022-019_	Long March 8	WSLS	Operational
Jilin-1 Gaofen-03D-16	27 February 2022, 03:06	0.75m PAN, 4-band MSI	2022-019_	Long March 8	WSLS	Operational
Jilin-1 Gaofen-03D-17	27 February 2022, 03:06	0.75m PAN, 4-band MSI	2022-019_	Long March 8	WSLS	Operational
Jilin-1 Gaofen-03D-18	27 February 2022, 03:06	0.75m PAN, 4-band MSI	2022-019_	Long March 8	WSLS	Operational
Jilin-1 Mofang-02A-01	27 February 2022, 03:06	Electro-optical	2022-019_	Long March 8	WSLS	Operational
Jilin-1 Gaofen-03D-04	30 April 2022, 03:30	0.75m PAN, 4-band MSI	2022-046_	Long March 11	Tai Rui	Operational
Jilin-1 Gaofen-03D-05	30 April 2022, 03:30	0.75m PAN, 4-band MSI	2022-046_	Long March 11	Tai Rui	Operational
Jilin-1 Gaofen-03D-06	30 April 2022, 03:30	0.75m PAN, 4-band MSI	2022-046_	Long March 11	Tai Rui	Operational
Jilin-1 Gaofen-03D-07	30 April 2022, 03:30	0.75m PAN, 4-band MSI	2022-046_	Long March 11	Tai Rui	Operational
Jilin-1 Gaofen-04A	30 April 2022, 03:30	Electro-optical	2022-046_	Long March 11	Tai Rui	Operational
Jilin-1 Kuanfu-01C	5 May 2022, 02:38	Electro-optical	2022-048_	Long March 2D	TSLC	Operational
Jilin-1 Gaofen-03D-27	5 May 2022, 02:38	0.75m PAN, 4-band MSI	2022-048_	Long March 2D	TSLC	Operational
Jilin-1 Gaofen-03D-28	5 May 2022, 02:38	0.75m PAN, 4-band MSI	2022-048_	Long March 2D	TSLC	Operational
Jilin-1 Gaofen-03D-29	5 May 2022, 02:38	0.75m PAN, 4-band MSI	2022-048_	Long March 2D	TSLC	Operational
Jilin-1 Gaofen-03D-30	5 May 2022, 02:38	0.75m PAN, 4-band MSI	2022-048_	Long March 2D	TSLC	Operational
Jilin-1 Gaofen-03D-31	5 May 2022, 02:38	0.75m PAN, 4-band MSI	2022-048_	Long March 2D	TSLC	Operational
Jilin-1 Gaofen-03D-32	5 May 2022, 02:38	0.75m PAN, 4-band MSI	2022-048_	Long March 2D	TSLC	Operational
Jilin-1 Gaofen-03D-33	5 May 2022, 02:38	0.75m PAN, 4-band MSI	2022-048_	Long March 2D	TSLC	Operational
Jilin-1 Mofang-01A	13 May 2022, 07:09	Electro-optical	Failure	Hyperbola-1	JSLC	Launch failed
Jilin-1 Gaofen-03D-09	10 August 2022	0.75m PAN, 4-band MSI	2022-098_	Long March 6	TSLC	Operational
Jilin-1 Gaofen-03D-35	10 August 2022	0.75m PAN, 4-band MSI	2022-098_	Long March 6	TSLC	Operational
Jilin-1 Gaofen-03D-36	10 August 2022	0.75m PAN, 4-band MSI	2022-098_	Long March 6	TSLC	Operational
Jilin-1 Gaofen-03D-37	10 August 2022	0.75m PAN, 4-band MSI	2022-098_	Long March 6	TSLC	Operational
Jilin-1 Gaofen-03D-38	10 August 2022	0.75m PAN, 4-band MSI	2022-098_	Long March 6	TSLC	Operational
Jilin-1 Gaofen-03D-39	10 August 2022	0.75m PAN, 4-band MSI	2022-098_	Long March 6	TSLC	Operational
Jilin-1 Gaofen-03D-40	10 August 2022	0.75m PAN, 4-band MSI	2022-098_	Long March 6	TSLC	Operational
Jilin-1 Gaofen-03D-41	10 August 2022	0.75m PAN, 4-band MSI	2022-098_	Long March 6	TSLC	Operational
Jilin-1 Gaofen-03D-42	10 August 2022	0.75m PAN, 4-band MSI	2022-098_	Long March 6	TSLC	Operational
Jilin-1 Gaofen-03D-43	10 August 2022	0.75m PAN, 4-band MSI	2022-098_	Long March 6	TSLC	Operational
Jilin-1 Hongwai-A01	10 August 2022	Infrared	2022-098_	Long March 6	TSLC	Operational
Jilin-1 Hongwai-A02	10 August 2022	Infrared	2022-098_	Long March 6	TSLC	Operational
Jilin-1 Hongwai-A03	10 August 2022	Infrared	2022-098_	Long March 6	TSLC	Operational
Jilin-1 Hongwai-A04	10 August 2022	Infrared	2022-098_	Long March 6	TSLC	Operational
Jilin-1 Hongwai-A05	10 August 2022	Infrared	2022-098_	Long March 6	TSLC	Operational
Jilin-1 Hongwai-A06	10 August 2022	Infrared	2022-098_	Long March 6	TSLC	Operational
Jilin-1 Gaofen-03D-08	16 November 2022, 06:20	0.75m PAN, 4-band MSI	2022-155_	Ceres-1	JSLC	Operational
Jilin-1 Gaofen-03D-51	16 November 2022, 06:20	0.75m PAN, 4-band MSI	2022-155_	Ceres-1	JSLC	Operational
Jilin-1 Gaofen-03D-52	16 November 2022, 06:20	0.75m PAN, 4-band MSI	2022-155_	Ceres-1	JSLC	Operational
Jilin-1 Gaofen-03D-53	16 November 2022, 06:20	0.75m PAN, 4-band MSI	2022-155_	Ceres-1	JSLC	Operational
Jilin-1 Gaofen-03D-54	16 November 2022, 06:20	0.75m PAN, 4-band MSI	2022-155_	Ceres-1	JSLC	Operational
Jilin-1 Gaofen-03D-44	9 December 2022, 06:35	0.75m PAN, 4-band MSI	2022-167_	Jielong 3	Tai Rui	Operational
Jilin-1 Gaofen-03D-45	9 December 2022, 06:35	0.75m PAN, 4-band MSI	2022-167_	Jielong 3	Tai Rui	Operational
Jilin-1 Gaofen-03D-46	9 December 2022, 06:35	0.75m PAN, 4-band MSI	2022-167_	Jielong 3	Tai Rui	Operational
Jilin-1 Gaofen-03D-47	9 December 2022, 06:35	0.75m PAN, 4-band MSI	2022-167_	Jielong 3	Tai Rui	Operational
Jilin-1 Gaofen-03D-48	9 December 2022, 06:35	0.75m PAN, 4-band MSI	2022-167_	Jielong 3	Tai Rui	Operational
Jilin-1 Gaofen-03D-49	9 December 2022, 06:35	0.75m PAN, 4-band MSI	2022-167_	Jielong 3	Tai Rui	Operational
Jilin-1 Gaofen-03D-50	9 December 2022, 06:35	0.75m PAN, 4-band MSI	2022-167_	Jielong 3	Tai Rui	Operational
Jilin-1 Pingtai-01A01	9 December 2022, 06:35	Unknown	2022-167_	Jielong 3	Tai Rui	Operational
Jilin-1 Gaofen-03D-34	15 January 2023, 03:14	0.75m PAN, 4-band MSI		Long March 2D	TSLC	Operational
Jilin-1 Mofang-02A03	15 January 2023, 03:14		2023-007_	Long March 2D	TSLC	Operational
Jilin-1 Mofang-02A04	15 January 2023, 03:14			Long March 2D	TSLC	Operational
Jilin-1 Mofang-02A07	15 January 2023, 03:14		2023-007_	Long March 2D	TSLC	Operational
Jilin-1 Hongwai-A07	15 January 2023, 03:14	Infrared	2023-007_	Long March 2D	TSLC	Operational
Jilin-1 Hongwai-A08	15 January 2023, 03:14	Infrared	2023-007_	Long March 2D	TSLC	Operational
Jilin-1 Gaofen-03D-19	15 June 2023, 05:30			Long March 2D	TSLC	Operational
Jilin-1 Gaofen-03D-20	15 June 2023, 05:30			Long March 2D	TSLC	Operational
Jilin-1 Gaofen-03D-21	15 June 2023, 05:30			Long March 2D	TSLC	Operational
Jilin-1 Gaofen-03D-22	15 June 2023, 05:30			Long March 2D	TSLC	Operational
Jilin-1 Gaofen-03D-23	15 June 2023, 05:30			Long March 2D	TSLC	Operational
Jilin-1 Gaofen-03D-24	15 June 2023, 05:30			Long March 2D	TSLC	Operational
Jilin-1 Gaofen-03D-25	15 June 2023, 05:30			Long March 2D	TSLC	Operational
Jilin-1 Gaofen-03D-26	15 June 2023, 05:30			Long March 2D	TSLC	Operational
Jilin-1 Gaofen-05A-01 (Khorgas 1)	15 June 2023, 05:30			Long March 2D	TSLC	Operational
Jilin-1 Gaofen-06A-01	15 June 2023, 05:30			Long March 2D	TSLC	Operational
Jilin-1 Gaofen-06A-02	15 June 2023, 05:30			Long March 2D	TSLC	Operational
Jilin-1 Gaofen-06A-03	15 June 2023, 05:30			Long March 2D	TSLC	Operational
Jilin-1 Gaofen-06A-04	15 June 2023, 05:30			Long March 2D	TSLC	Operational
Jilin-1 Gaofen-06A-05	15 June 2023, 05:30			Long March 2D	TSLC	Operational
Jilin-1 Gaofen-06A-06	15 June 2023, 05:30			Long March 2D	TSLC	Operational
Jilin-1 Gaofen-06A-07	15 June 2023, 05:30			Long March 2D	TSLC	Operational
Jilin-1 Gaofen-06A-08	15 June 2023, 05:30			Long March 2D	TSLC	Operational
Jilin-1 Gaofen-06A-09	15 June 2023, 05:30			Long March 2D	TSLC	Operational
Jilin-1 Gaofen-06A-10	15 June 2023, 05:30			Long March 2D	TSLC	Operational
Jilin-1 Gaofen-06A-11	15 June 2023, 05:30			Long March 2D	TSLC	Operational
Jilin-1 Gaofen-06A-12	15 June 2023, 05:30			Long March 2D	TSLC	Operational
Jilin-1 Gaofen-06A-13	15 June 2023, 05:30			Long March 2D	TSLC	Operational
Jilin-1 Gaofen-06A-14	15 June 2023, 05:30			Long March 2D	TSLC	Operational
Jilin-1 Gaofen-06A-15	15 June 2023, 05:30			Long March 2D	TSLC	Operational
Jilin-1 Gaofen-06A-16	15 June 2023, 05:30			Long March 2D	TSLC	Operational
Jilin-1 Gaofen-06A-17	15 June 2023, 05:30			Long March 2D	TSLC	Operational
Jilin-1 Gaofen-06A-18	15 June 2023, 05:30			Long March 2D	TSLC	Operational
Jilin-1 Gaofen-06A-19	15 June 2023, 05:30			Long March 2D	TSLC	Operational
Jilin-1 Gaofen-06A-20	15 June 2023, 05:30			Long March 2D	TSLC	Operational
Jilin-1 Gaofen-06A-21	15 June 2023, 05:30			Long March 2D	TSLC	Operational
Jilin-1 Gaofen-06A-22	15 June 2023, 05:30			Long March 2D	TSLC	Operational
Jilin-1 Gaofen-06A-23	15 June 2023, 05:30			Long March 2D	TSLC	Operational
Jilin-1 Gaofen-06A-24	15 June 2023, 05:30			Long March 2D	TSLC	Operational
Jilin-1 Gaofen-06A-25	15 June 2023, 05:30			Long March 2D	TSLC	Operational
Jilin-1 Gaofen-06A-26	15 June 2023, 05:30			Long March 2D	TSLC	Operational
Jilin-1 Gaofen-06A-27	15 June 2023, 05:30			Long March 2D	TSLC	Operational
Jilin-1 Gaofen-06A-28	15 June 2023, 05:30			Long March 2D	TSLC	Operational
Jilin-1 Gaofen-06A-29	15 June 2023, 05:30			Long March 2D	TSLC	Operational
Jilin-1 Gaofen-06A-30	15 June 2023, 05:30			Long March 2D	TSLC	Operational
Jilin-1 Pingtai-02A-01	15 June 2023, 05:30			Long March 2D	TSLC	Operational
Jilin-1 Pingtai-02A-02	15 June 2023, 05:30			Long March 2D	TSLC	Operational
Jilin-1 Kuanfu-02A	25 August 2023, 23:45			Ceres-1	JSLC	Operational
Jilin-1 Gaofen-04B	21 September 2023, 04:59:10		Failure	Ceres-1	JSLC	Launch failed
Jilin-1 Kuanfu-02B-01 (Qilian-1)	20 September 2024, 04:10			Long March 2D	TSLC LA-9	Operational
Jilin-1 Kuanfu-02B-02	20 September 2024, 04:10			Long March 2D	TSLC LA-9	Operational
Jilin-1 Kuanfu-02B-03	20 September 2024, 04:10			Long March 2D	TSLC LA-9	Operational
Jilin-1 Kuanfu-02B-04	20 September 2024, 04:10			Long March 2D	TSLC LA-9	Operational
Jilin-1 Kuanfu-02B-05	20 September 2024, 04:10			Long March 2D	TSLC LA-9	Operational
Jilin-1 Kuanfu-02B-06	20 September 2024, 04:10			Long March 2D	TSLC LA-9	Operational
Jilin-1 SAR-01A-01	24 September 2024, 23:35			Kinetica 1	JSLC LS-130	Operational
Jilin-1 Gaofen-05B	11 November 2024, 04:30			Kinetica 1	JSLC LS-130	Operational
Jilin-1 Pingtai-02A-03	11 November 2024, 04:30			Kinetica 1	JSLC LS-130	Operational
Jilin-1 Kuanfu-02B-07 (Jiangsu Dizhi)	11 October 2025			Gravity-1	Dong Fang Hang Tian Gang platform, Yellow Sea	Operational
Jilin-1 Gaofen-04C	10 November 2025			Ceres-1	JSLC	Launch failure
Jilin-1 Pingtai-02A-04	10 November 2025			Ceres-1	JSLC	Launch failure

== See also ==
- Yunyao-1
- Yaogan
- Fanhui Shi Weixing
- Gaofen
- China Siwei
