= Small-lift launch vehicle =

Rocket able to lift less than 2,000 kg to low Earth orbit

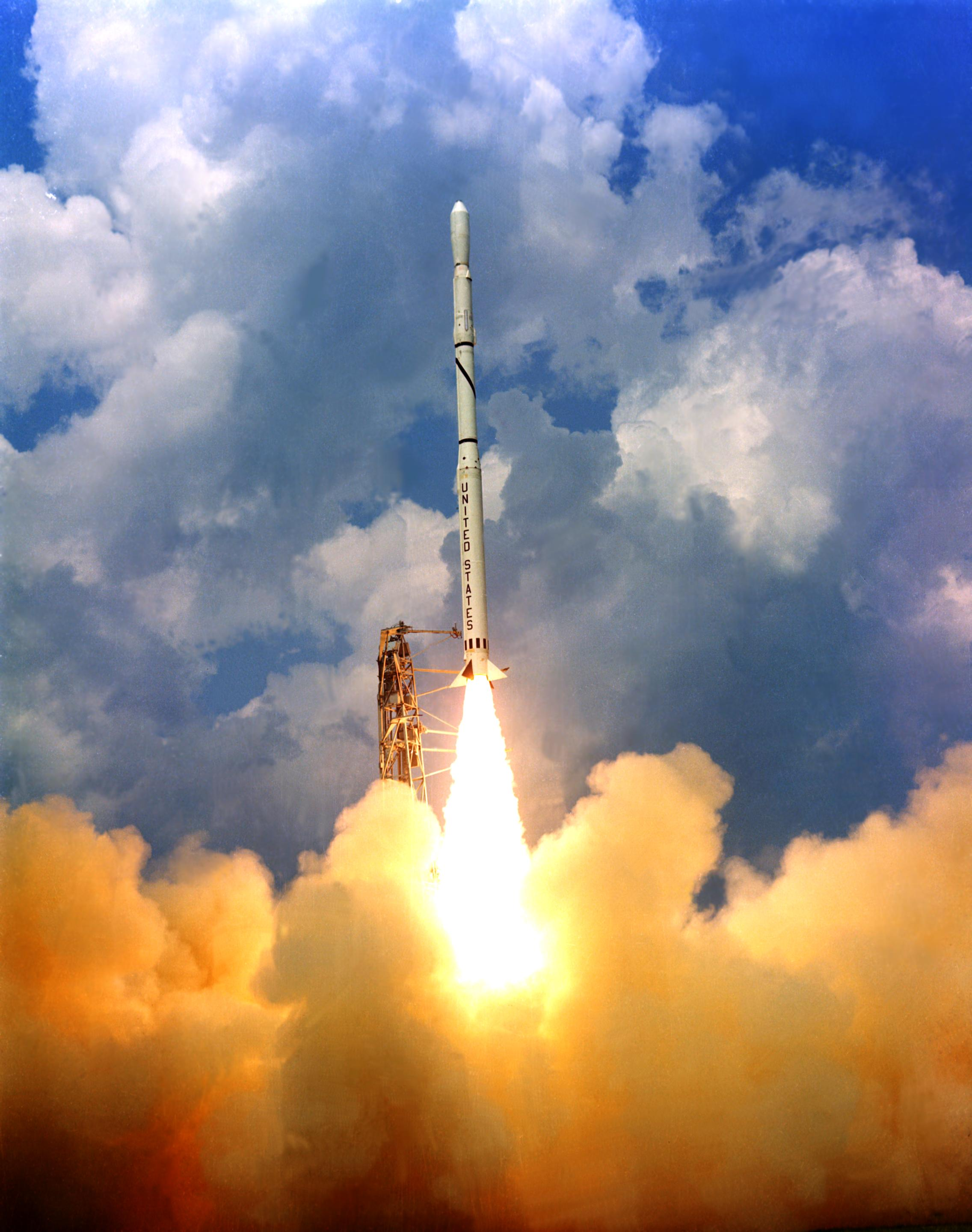
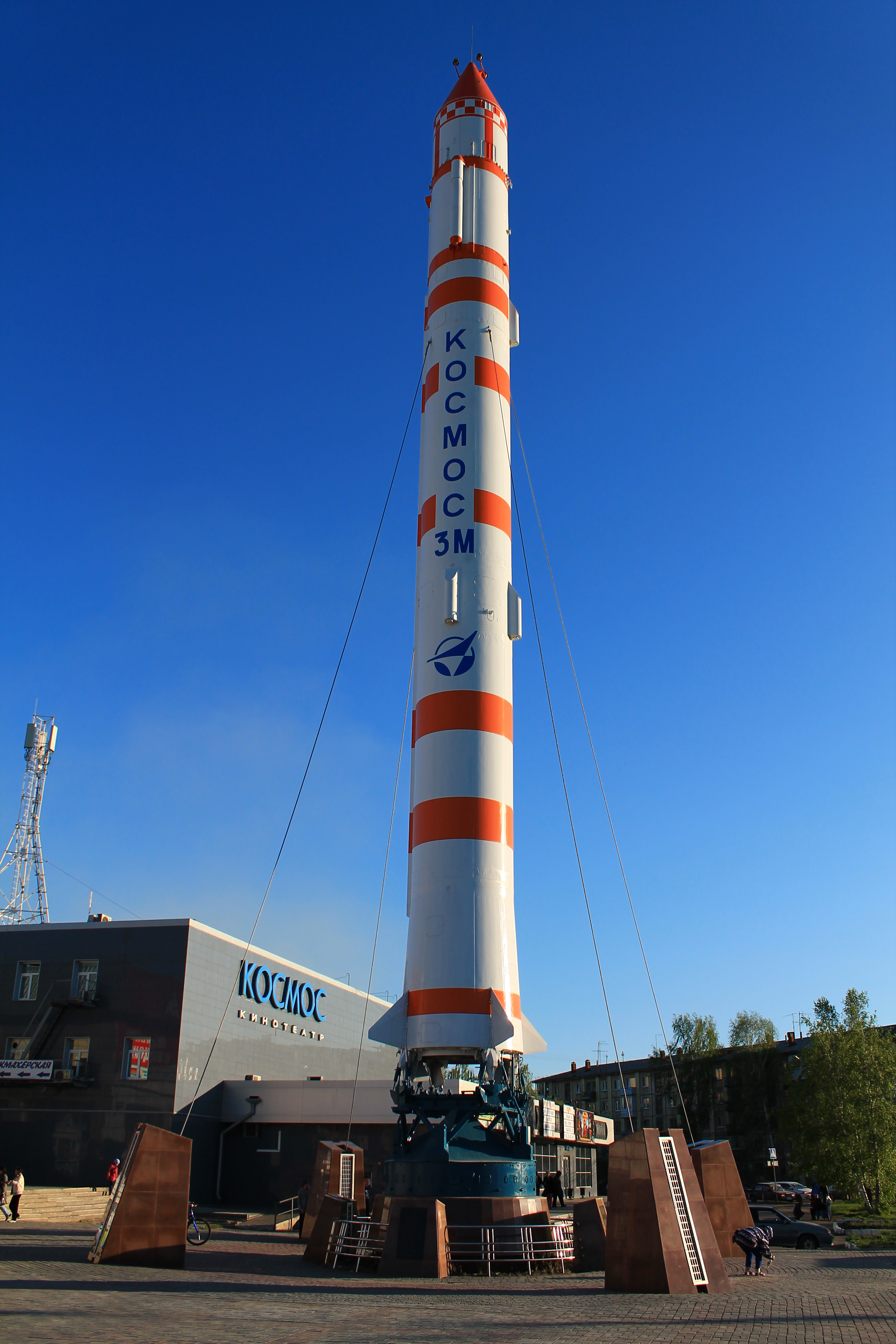
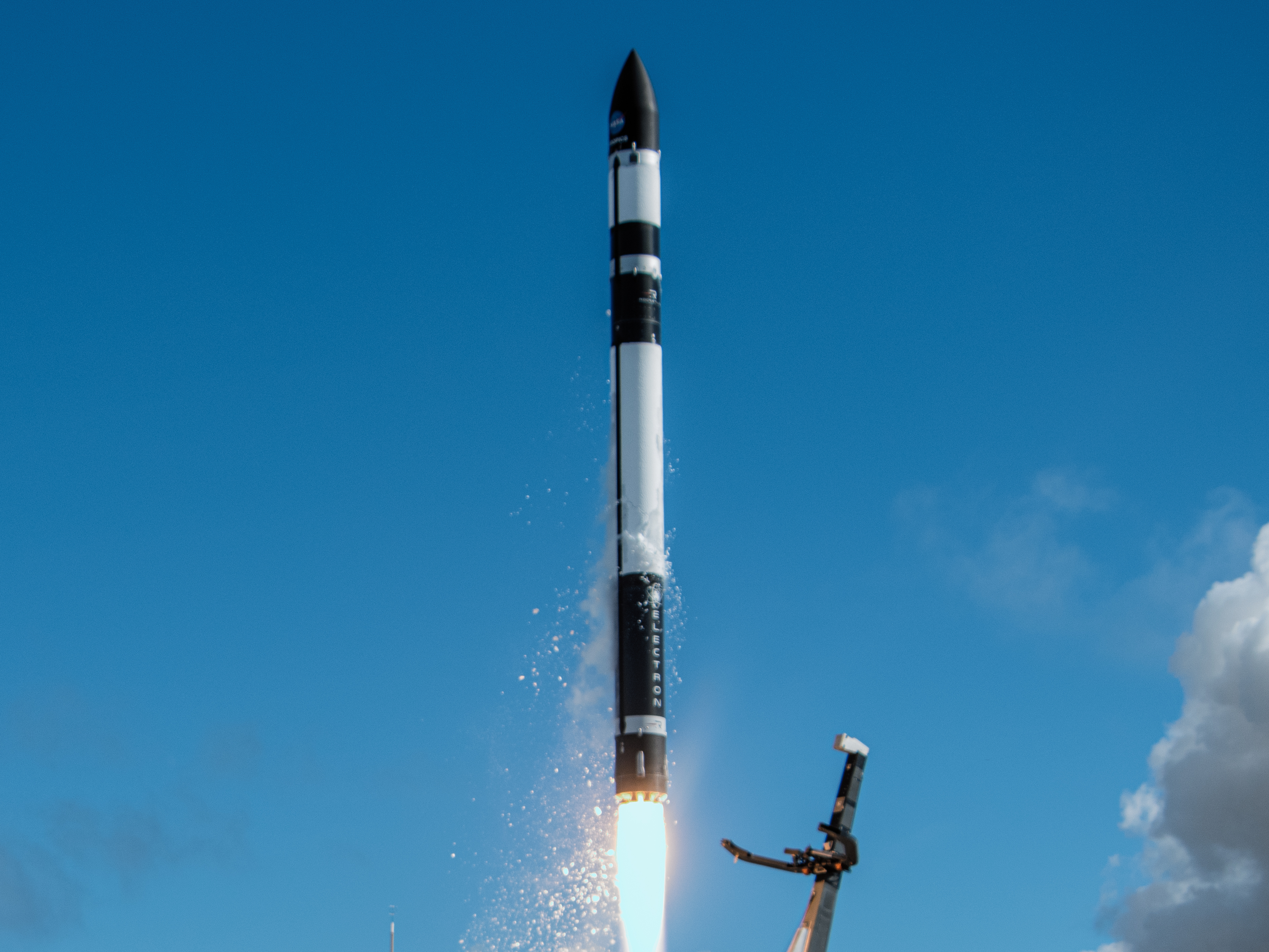
- From left: Scout, Kosmos-3M and Electron, three of the most launched small-lift launch vehicles

Class overview
- Name: Small-lift launch vehicle
- Preceded by: Sounding rocket
- Succeeded by: Medium-lift launch vehicle
- Built: Since 1957

General characteristics
- Capacity: US definition: <2,000 kg (4,400 lb); Russian definition: <5,000 kg (11,000 lb)

A small-lift launch vehicle is a rocket orbital launch vehicle that is capable of lifting 2,000 kilograms (4,400 lb) or less (by NASA classification) or under 5,000 kilograms (11,000 lb) (by Roscosmos classification) of payload into low Earth orbit (LEO). Small launch vehicles can meet the requirements of some spacecraft and can be less expensive than a larger launch vehicle would be. The next larger category is medium-lift launch vehicles.

== History ==
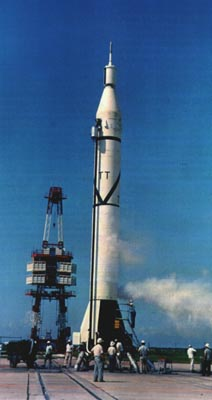
Juno I carrying Explorer 4 in 1958

The first small-lift launch vehicle was the Sputnik rocket, launched by the Soviet Union, which was derived from the R-7 Semyorka ICBM. On 4 October 1957, the Sputnik rocket was used to perform the world's first satellite launch, placing the Sputnik 1 satellite into a low Earth orbit. The US responded by attempting to launch the Vanguard rocket. However, the Vanguard TV3 launch attempt failed, with the 31 January 1958 launch of the Explorer 1 satellite using the Juno I rocket being the first successful US orbital launch. The Vanguard I mission was the second successful US orbital launch. This was the start of the space race.

Since the late 1950s, small-lift launch vehicles have continued launching payloads into orbits including LEO, Sun-synchronous orbit (SSO), and geostationary transfer orbit (GTO). Medium-lift launch vehicles, heavy-lift launch vehicles, and super heavy-lift launch vehicles have also been extensively developed but have not completely superseded small launch vehicles.

== Rated launch vehicles ==
This is a list of small launch vehicles by payloads to Low-earth orbit (LEO). Increments denote suborbital launches. The list is based on NASA's classification of an orbital launch vehicle that is capable of lifting 2,000 kilograms (4,400 lb) or less. The data is mainly fetched from Gunter's and Flight Atlas' launch vehicles statistics.

=== Operational ===
| Vehicle | Origin | Manufacturer | Mass to LEO (kg) | Mass to SSO or GTO (kg) | First flight |
|---|---|---|---|---|---|
| Qased | Iran | IRGCASF | 40 | | 2020 |
| Qaem 100 | Iran | IRGC | 80 | | 2023 |
| Mir | Republic of Korea | MND | 100 | | 2023 |
| Shavit 2 | Israel | IAE | 160−300 | | 1988 |
| Unha | North Korea | KCST | 200 | | 2009 |
| Electron | New Zealand; United States | Rocket Lab | 300 | 200 to SSO | 2017 |
| Hyperbola-1 | China | i-Space | 300 | 260 to SSO | 2020 |
| Chollima-1 | North Korea | NADA | 200−300 | | 2023 |
| Ceres-1 | China | Galactic Energy | 350 | | 2020 |
| Vikram-1 | India | Skyroot Aerospace | 350 | 260 to SSO | 2026 |
| Long March 11 | China | CALT | 500 | | 2015 |
| SSLV | India | ISRO / NSIL | 500 | 300 to SSO | 2022 |
| Minotaur I | United States | Northrop Grumman | 580 | 331 to SSO | 2000 |
| Alpha | United States | Firefly | 1,030 | 630 to SSO | 2021 |
| Spectrum | Germany | Isar Aerospace | 1,000 | 700 to SSO | 2025 |
| Kuaizhou-11 | China | ExPace | 1,000 | 700 to SSO | 2020 |
| Epsilon | Japan | IHI | 1,200 | 590 to SSO & 500 to GTO | 2013 |
| Long March 6 | China | CALT | 1,500 | 500 to SSO | 2015 |
| Jielong 3 | China | CALT | 1600 | 1,500 to SSO | 2022 |
| Minotaur IV | United States | Northrop Grumman | 1,735 | | 2010 |
| Kinetica 1 | China | CAS Space | 2,000 | 1,500 to SSO | 2022 |
| Tianlong-2 | China | Space Pioneer | 2,000 | 1,500 to SSO | 2023 |

=== Under development ===
| Vehicle | Origin | Manufacturer | Mass to LEO (kg) | Mass to other orbits (kg) | First flight (expected) |
|---|---|---|---|---|---|
| Blue Whale 1 | South Korea | Perigee Aerospace | 63 | 50 to SSO | TBD |
| Agnibaan | India | Agnikul Cosmos | 100 | | TBD |
| ZERO | Japan | Interstellar Technologies | | 100 to SSO | 2027 |
| VLM | Brazil | Brazilian General Command for Aerospace Technology | 150 | | 2028 |
| DNLV | Malaysia | Independence-X Aerospace | 200 | | 2029 |
| Volans | Singapore | Equatorial Space Systems | 220 | 150 to SSO | TBD |
| Zuljanah | Iran | Iranian Space Agency | 220 | | TBD |
| Skyrora XL | United Kingdom | Skyrora | 315 | | 2027 |
| Hapith V | Taiwan | TiSPACE | 390 | 350 to SSO | |
| Ravn X SL3 | United States | Aevum Space & Defense | 500 | 470 to SSO | 2026 |
| Vikram II | India | Skyroot Aerospace | 520 | 410 to SSO | TBD |
| Rocket 4 | United States | Astra Space, Inc. | 600 | | 2026 |
| Vikram III | India | Skyroot Aerospace | 720 | 580 to SSO | TBD |
| Tronador II | Argentina | VENG | 750 | | 2029 |
| Miura 5 | Spain | PLD Space | 900 | | 2026 |
| RFA One | Germany | Rocket Factory Augsburg | 1,600 | 1,300 | 2026 |
| Aurora | Canada | Reaction Dynamics | ~200 | 250 to SSO | 2028 |
| Tundra | Canada | NordSpace | 500 | 350 to SSO | 2028 |
| R-1 | Canada | Canadian Rocket Company | 700 | 400 to SSO | 2028 |

=== Retired ===
| Vehicle | Origin | Manufacturer | Mass to LEO (kg) | Mass to other orbits (kg) | Launches | First flight | Last flight |
|---|---|---|---|---|---|---|---|
| SS-520 | Japan | IHI | 4 | | 2 | 2017 | 2018 |
| Vanguard | United States | Martin | 9 | | 11(+1) | 1957 | 1959 |
| Juno I | United States | Chrysler | 11 | | 6 | 1958 | 1959 |
| Veloce 17 | United States | Eldorado Space | 12 | | 0 | | |
| Lambda 4S | Japan | Nissan | 26 | | 5 | 1966 | 1977 |
| SLV | India | ISRO | 40 | | 4 | 1979 | 1983 |
| Juno II | United States | Chrysler | 41 | | 10 | 1958 | 1961 |
| Boeing Small Launch Vehicle | United States | Boeing | 45 | | 0 | | |
| Rocket 3 | United States | Astra | 45 | | 7(+2) | 2020 | 2022 |
| Safir | Iran | Iranian Space Agency | 50 | | 8 | 2008 | 2019 |
| Vector-R | United States | Vector | 60 | | 0(+2) | | |
| Diamant | France | SEREB | 107 | | 12 | 1965 | 1975 |
| Vector-H | United States | Vector | 110 | | 0 | | |
| Capricornio | Spain | INTA | 140 | | 0 | | |
| ASLV | India | ISRO | 150 | | 4 | 1987 | 1994 |
| Scout | United States | US Air Force/NASA | 174 | | 125 | 1961 | 1994 |
| Mu-4S | Japan | Nissan | 180 | | 4 | 1971 | 1972 |
| Mu-3C | Japan | Nissan | 195 | | 4 | 1974 | 1979 |
| Kuaizhou-1 | China | ExPace | 250 | 250 to SSO | 2 | 2013 | 2014 |
| Simorgh | Iran | Iranian Space Agency | 250−350 | | 6(+1) | 2016 | 2024 |
| Shtil' | Russia | Makeyev | 280 – 420 | | 2 | 1998 | 2006 |
| Kuaizhou 1A | China | ExPace | 300 | 250 to SSO | 30 | 2017 | 2025 |
| Mu-3H | Japan | Nissan | 300 | | 3 | 1977 | 1978 |
| Mu-3S | Japan | Nissan | 300 | | 4 | 1980 | 1984 |
| Long March 1 | China | CALT | 300 | | 2 | 1970 | 1971 |
| Zhuque-1 | China | LandSpace | 300 | 200 to SSO | 1 | 2018 | 2018 |
| Jielong 1 | China | CALT | | 200 to SSO | 1 | 2019 | 2019 |
| Delta 1913 | United States | McDonnell Douglas | 328 | | 1 | 1973 | 1973 |
| Delta 2310 | United States | McDonnell Douglas | 336 | | 3 | 1974 | 1981 |
| Delta 1410 | United States | McDonnell Douglas | 340 | | 1 | 1975 | 1975 |
| VLS-1 | Brazil | AEB, INPE | 380 | | 2 (Note: A third rocket exploded 3-days before launch) | 1997 | 1999 |
| Delta 1604 | United States | McDonnell Douglas | 390 | | 2 | 1972 | 1973 |
| Falcon 1 | United States | SpaceX | 420 | | 5 | 2006 | 2009 |
| Pegasus | United States | Orbital | 443 | | 45 | 1990 | 2021 |
| Conestoga | United States | Space Services Inc. | 500 | | 3 | 1982 | 1995 |
| Sputnik 8K71PS | Soviet Union | RSC Energia | 500 | | 2 | 1957 | 1957 |
| Launcher One | United States | Virgin Orbit | 500 | 300 to SSO | 6 | 2020 | |
| Start-1 | Russia | MITT | 632−850 | 350 to SSO | 5 | 1993 | 2006 |
| Paektusan | North Korea | KCST | 700 | | 1 | 1998 | |
| Long March 1D (CZ-1D) | China | CALT | 740 | | 0(+3) | 1995 (Note: Suborbital test flights in 1995, 1997 and 2002, no orbital launches attempted) | 2002 |
| Mu-3SII | Japan | Nissan | 770 | | 8 | 1985 | 1995 |
| Athena I | United States | Lockheed Martin | 795 | 515 to GTO | 4 | 1995 | 2001 |
| Delta 3913 | United States | McDonnell Douglas | 816 | | 1 | 1981 | 1981 |
| J-I | Japan | IHI, Nissan | 1,000 | | 0(+1) | 1996 | 1996 |
| Delta 1910 | United States | McDonnell Douglas | 1,066 | | 1 | 1975 | 1975 |
| N-I | Japan; United States | Mitsubishi | 1,200 | | 7 | 1975 | 1982 |
| Terran 1 | United States | Relativity Space | 1,250 | | 1 | 2023 | 2023 |
| Delta 0900 | United States | McDonnell Douglas | 1,300 | 818 to SSO | 2 | 1972 | 1972 |
| Sputnik 8A91 | Soviet Union | RSC Energia | 1,327 | | 2 | 1958 | 1958 |
| Atlas LV-3B | United States | Convair | 1,360 | | 9 | 1960 | 1963 |
| H-I | Japan; United States | Mitsubishi | 1,400 | | 9 | 1986 | 1992 |
| Minotaur-C | United States | Northrop Grumman | 1,450 | 1,050 to SSO | 10 | 1994 | 2017 |
| Kosmos-3M | Soviet Union; Russia | NPO Polyot | 1,500 | | 442 | 1967 | 2010 |
| Strela | Russia | Khrunichev | 1,700 | | 3 | 2003 | 2014 |
| M-V | Japan | IHI, Nissan | 1,800 | | 7 | 1997 | 2006 |
| Athena II | United States | Lockheed Martin | 1,800 | | 3 | 1998 | 1999 |
| Delta 1900 | United States | McDonnell Douglas | 1,800 | | 1 | 1973 | 1973 |
| Delta 2910 | United States | McDonnell Douglas | 1,887 | | 6 | 1975 | 1978 |
| Rokot | Soviet Union; Russia | Khrunichev | 1,950 | 1,200 to SSO | 34 | 1990 | 2019 |
| Vega | Italy; Europe (Note: The lead manufacturer is from Italy, but the rocket has significant contributions from companies based in Belgium, France, Netherlands, Spain, Switzerland and Ukraine.) | Avio | | 1,450 to SSO | 22 | 2012 | 2024 |

== See also ==
- Sounding rocket, suborbital launch vehicle
- Medium-lift launch vehicle, capable of lifting between 2,000 and 20,000 kg to low Earth orbit
- Heavy-lift launch vehicle, capable of lifting between 20,000 and 50,000 kg to low Earth orbit
- Super heavy-lift launch vehicles, capable of lifting more than 50,000 kg (110,000 lb) to low Earth orbit
- Comparison of orbital launch systems
- List of orbital launch systems
- Comparison of orbital rocket engines
- Comparison of space station cargo vehicles
- Rocket
- Spacecraft propulsion
