= X-Bow Systems =

American aerospace company

X-Bow Launch Systems
- Industry: Aerospace; Defense; Rocketry & Propulsion
- Founded: 2016
- Headquarters: Albuquerque, New Mexico
- Website: xbowsystems.com

X-Bow Systems is an Albuquerque, New Mexico-based space company that produces solid rocket motors and small launch vehicles to be used for orbital and suborbital launch services.

Founded in 2016, the company has operations in New Mexico, California, Arizona, Alabama, Colorado, Texas, Maryland, Utah, and Washington D.C.

== History ==
X-Bow Systems was co-founded by Jason Hundley, Maureen Gannon, John Leary, Mark Kaufman, and Yasmin Seyal.

On 27 July 2022, the company successfully launched its first Bolt Rocket. In September 2023, the U.S. Air Force Research Laboratory awarded X-Bow Systems a $17.8 million contract to demonstrate its technologies.
