= Jielong 3 =

Chinese solid-propellant space launch vehicle

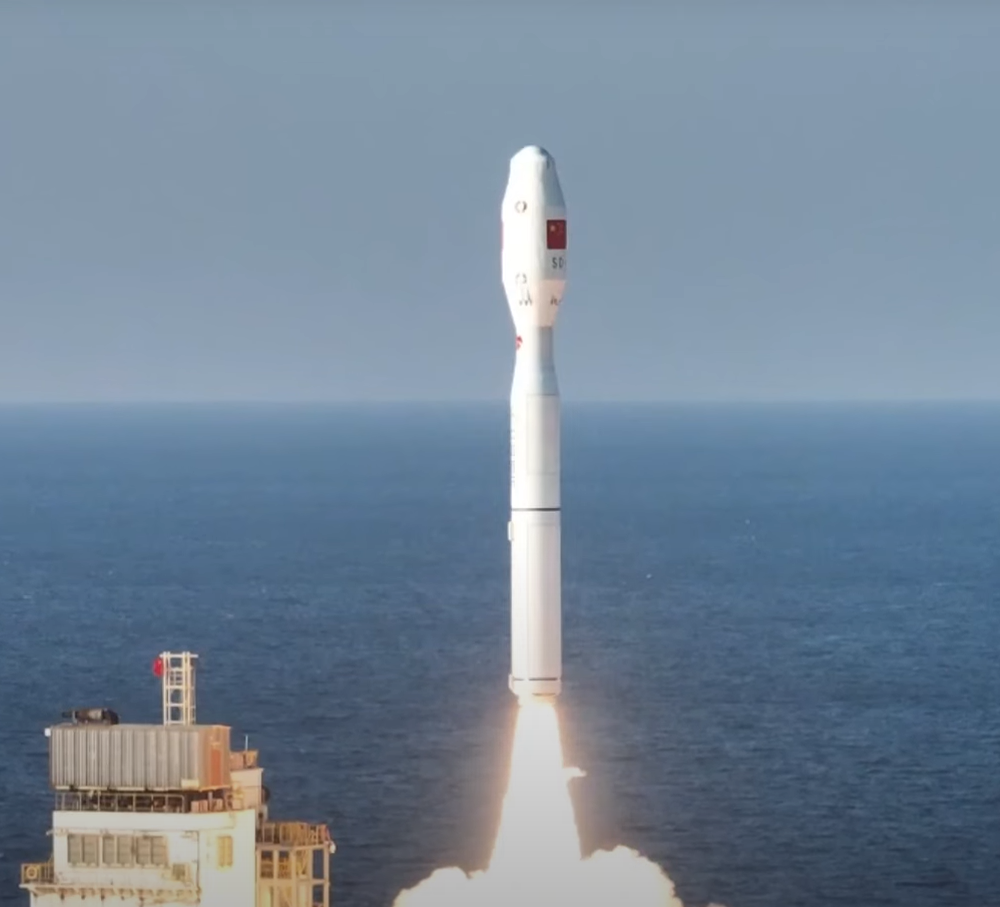
- Maiden launch of Jielong-3
- Function: Small orbital launch vehicle
- Manufacturer: CALT
- Country of origin: China

Size
- Height: 31 m (102 ft)
- Diameter: 2.64 m (8.7 ft)
- Mass: 145,000 kg (320,000 lb)
- Stages: 4

Capacity

Payload to LEO
- Mass: 1,600 kg (3,500 lb)

Payload to SSO 500 km
- Mass: 1,500 kg (3,300 lb)

Associated rockets
- Comparable: Jielong 1, Minotaur I Pegasus; Start-1; Electron

Launch history
- Status: Active
- Launch sites: Special converted barge, Yellow Sea
- Total launches: 12
- Success(es): 12
- First flight: 9 December 2022
- Last flight: 5 August 2026

Jielong 3 (Chinese: 捷龙三号运载火箭, meaning "agile dragon", also known as Smart Dragon 3, SD-3), is a solid fueled orbital launch vehicle developed by China Academy of Launch Vehicle Technology's subsidiary China Rocket to launch up to 1600 kg to the Low earth orbit (LEO) and 1500 kg to a 500 km altitude Sun-synchronous orbit (SSO). The rocket is 31 meters tall, 2.65 meters in diameter and weighs 145 metric tons. It is a solid fuel, 4 stage orbital rocket. The fairing diameter is 3.35 m. It uses the same rocket motors as the Kinetica 1 rocket.

The maiden flight of Jielong 3 on 9 December 2022, 06:35 UTC was successful. It delivered fourteen small satellites into polar orbit. The satellites were Jilin-1 Gaofen-03D-44-50 and Pingtai-01A01, HEAD 2H, Jinzijing Qilu-1 05 and 06, Tianqi 07, Huoju 1 (Torch 1) and CAS 5A. The launch took place from a floating platform off Yantai, Shandong.

The carrying capacity of the Jielong 3 launcher initially stood at 1,560 kilograms to 500 kilometres SSO orbits, but this has since increased to 1,600 kilograms by the rocket's fifth launch on 13 January, 2025. Also in January 2025, Gao Lijun from the China Aerospace Science and Technology Corporation (CASC) stated that further improvements will be made to the rocket in order to enable it eventually to carry up to two metric tons to 500 km SSO orbits.

== Launch statistics summary ==
=== Launch outcomes ===
- Failure
- Partial failure
- Success
- Planned

== List of launches ==
Serial number	Flight number	Date (UTC)	Launch site	Payload	Orbit	Outcome
1	Y1	9 December 2022; 06:35	Special converted barge (Tai Rui); East China Sea (37.3°N, 123.7°E)	Jilin-1 Gaofen-03D-44-50; Jilin-1 Pingtai-01A01; HEAD 2H; Jinzijing Qilu-1 05, 06; Tianqi 07; Huoju 1 CAS 5A	SSO	Success
2	Y2	5 December 2023; 19:24	Special converted barge (Bo Run Jiu Zhou); South China Sea (21.2°N, 112.1°E)	Hulianwang Jishu Shiyan 3A	LEO	Success
3	Y3	3 February 2024; 03:06	Special converted barge (Bo Run Jiu Zhou); South China Sea (21.2°N, 112.1°E)	Dongfang Huiyan-GF01; DRO-L; NEXSAT-1; WeiHai-1-01/02; XingShiDai-18/19/20; Zhixing-2A	SSO	Success
4	Y4	24 September 2024; 02:31	Special converted barge (Dong Fang Hang Tian Gang); Yellow Sea (36.4°N, 121.1°E)	Tianyi-41; Luojia 4-01; Fudan-1; Tianyan-15; Jitianxing A-01; Xingshidai-15/21/22	SSO	Success
5	Y5	13 January 2025; 03:00	Special converted barge (Dong Fang Hang Tian Gang); Offshore waters of Rizhao, Yellow Sea	CentiSpace-1 × 10	LEO	Success
6	Y6	8 August 2025; 16:31	Special converted barge (Dong Fang Hang Tian Gang); Offshore waters of Rizhao, Yellow Sea	GeeSat × 11	LEO	Success
7	Y7	8 September 2025; 19:48	Special converted barge (Dong Fang Hang Tian Gang); Offshore waters of Rizhao, Yellow Sea	GeeSat × 11	LEO	Success
8	Y8	24 September 2025; 07:56	Special converted barge (Dong Fang Hang Tian Gang); Offshore waters of Rizhao, Yellow Sea	GeeSat × 12	LEO	Success
9	Y9	12 February 2026; 06:37	Special converted barge (Dong Fang Hang Tian Gang); Offshore waters of Haiyang Port	PRSC-EO2 & 6 satellites	SSO	Success
10	Y10	22 March 2026; 15:49	Special converted barge (Dong Fang Hang Tian Gang); Offshore waters of Haiyang Port	CentiSpace-1 × 10	LEO	Success
11	Y11	11 April 2026; 11:32	Special converted barge (Dong Fang Hang Tian Gang); Offshore waters of Haiyang Port	SatNet test satellite	LEO	Success
12	Y12	5 August 2026; 02:38	Special converted barge (Dong Fang Hang Tian Gang); Offshore waters of Haiyang Port	OSE HS-01 & 02	SSO	Success
