= Medium-lift launch vehicle =

Category of space launch vehicle

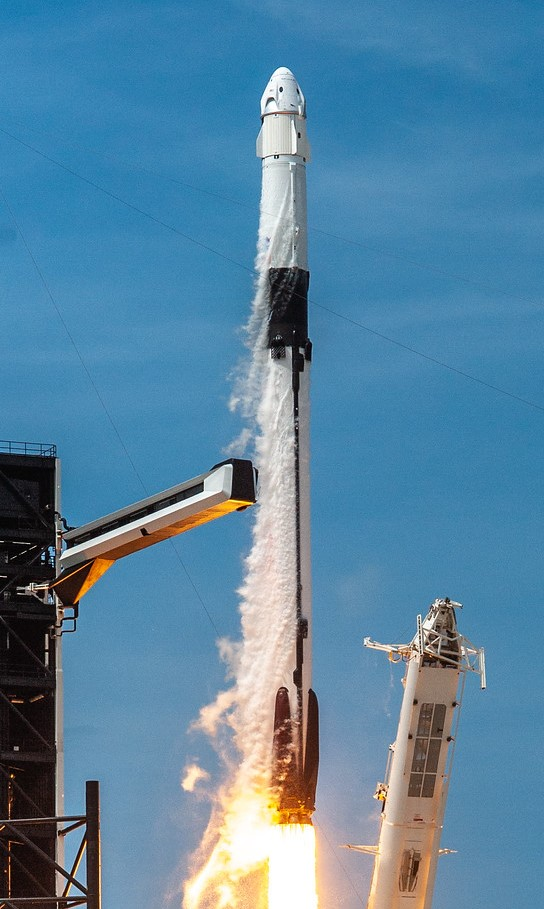
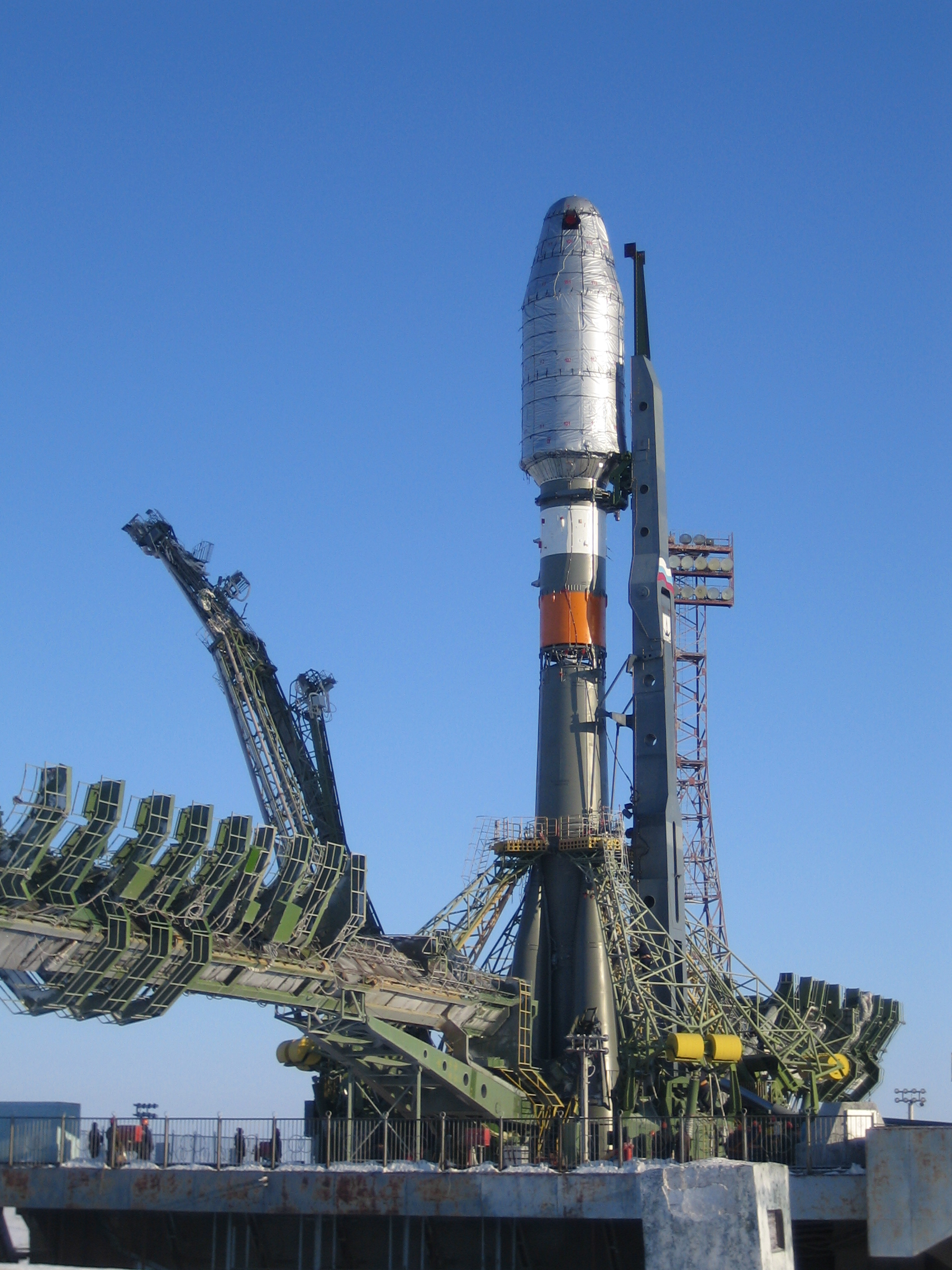
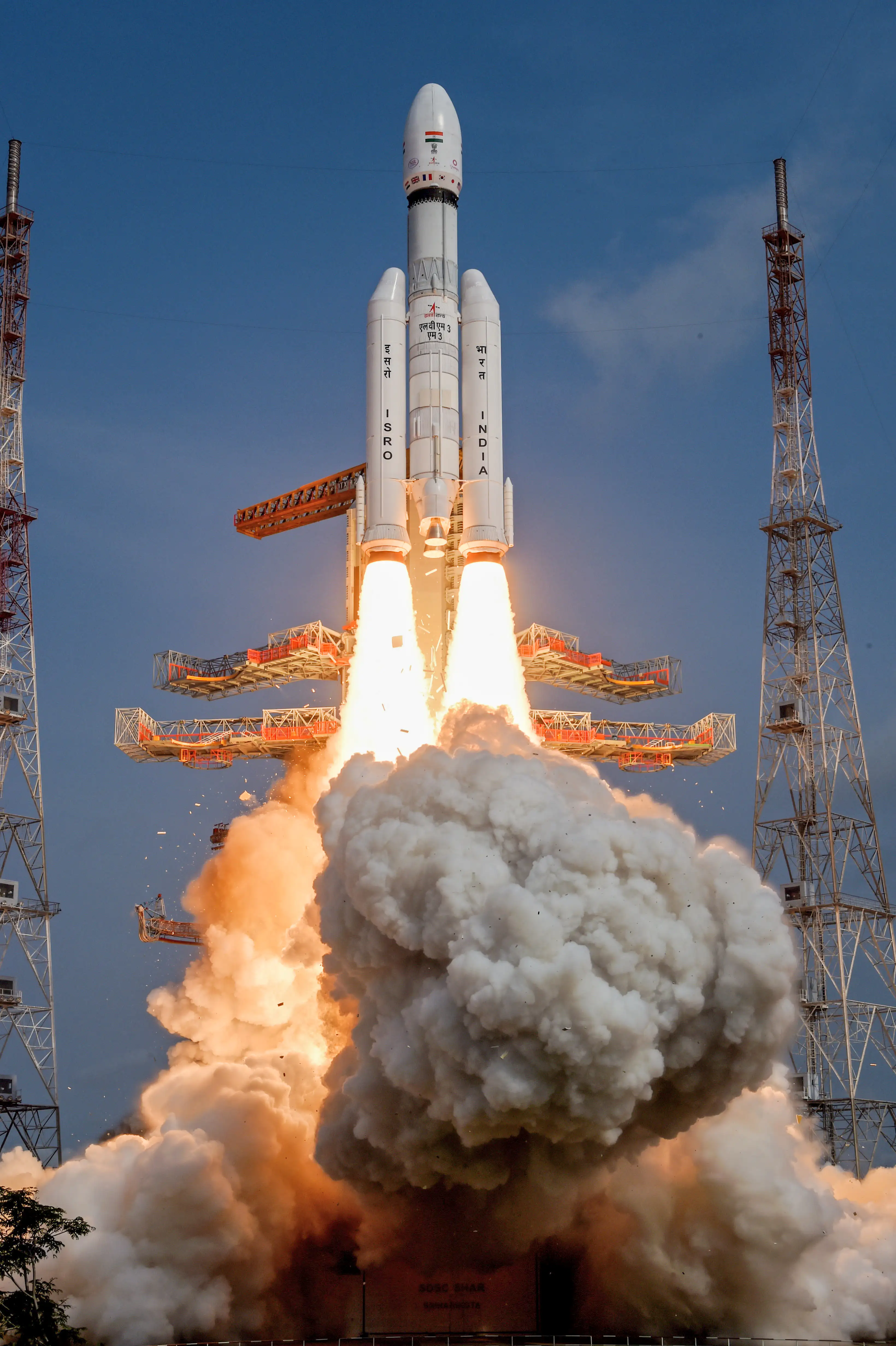
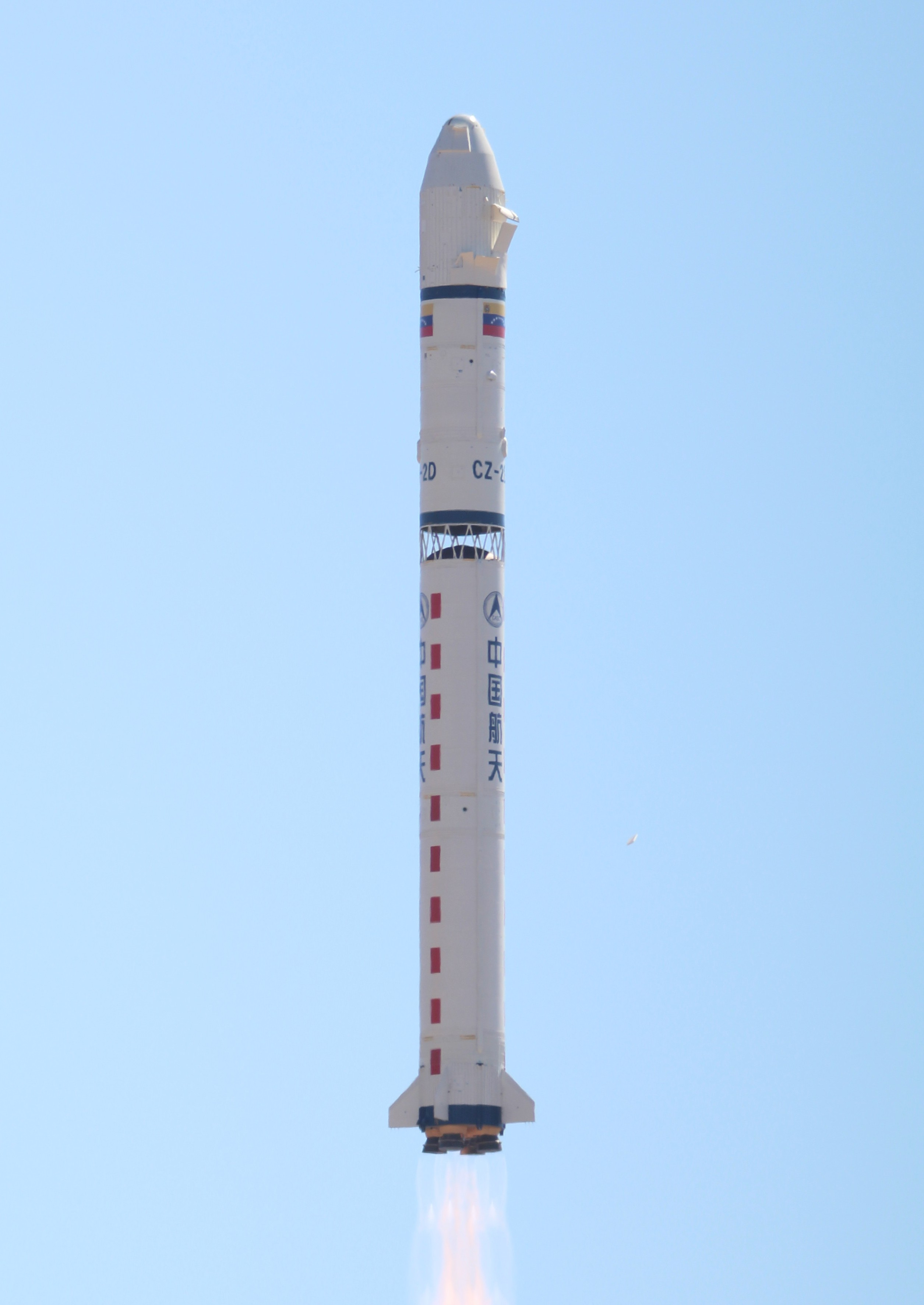
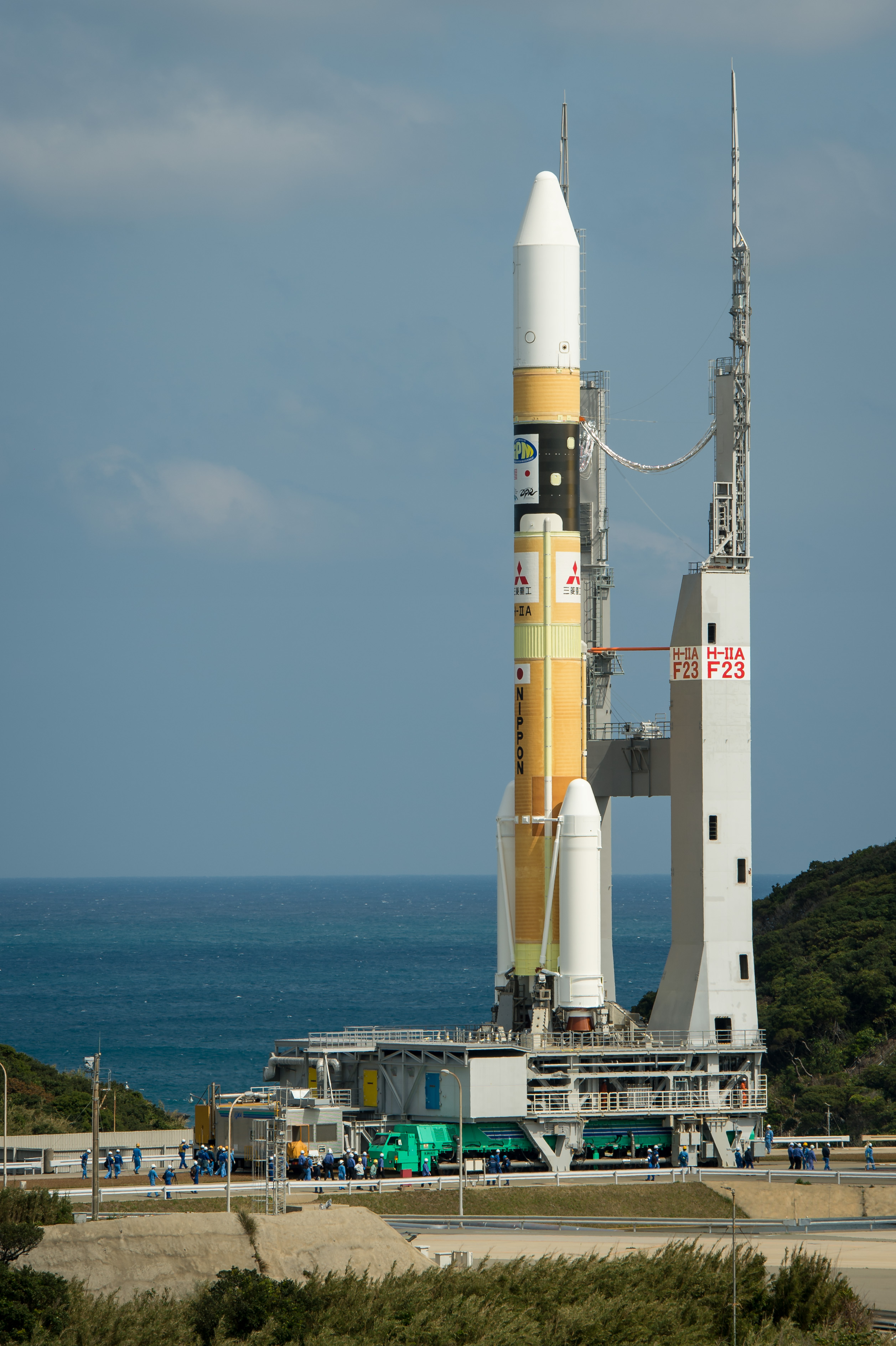
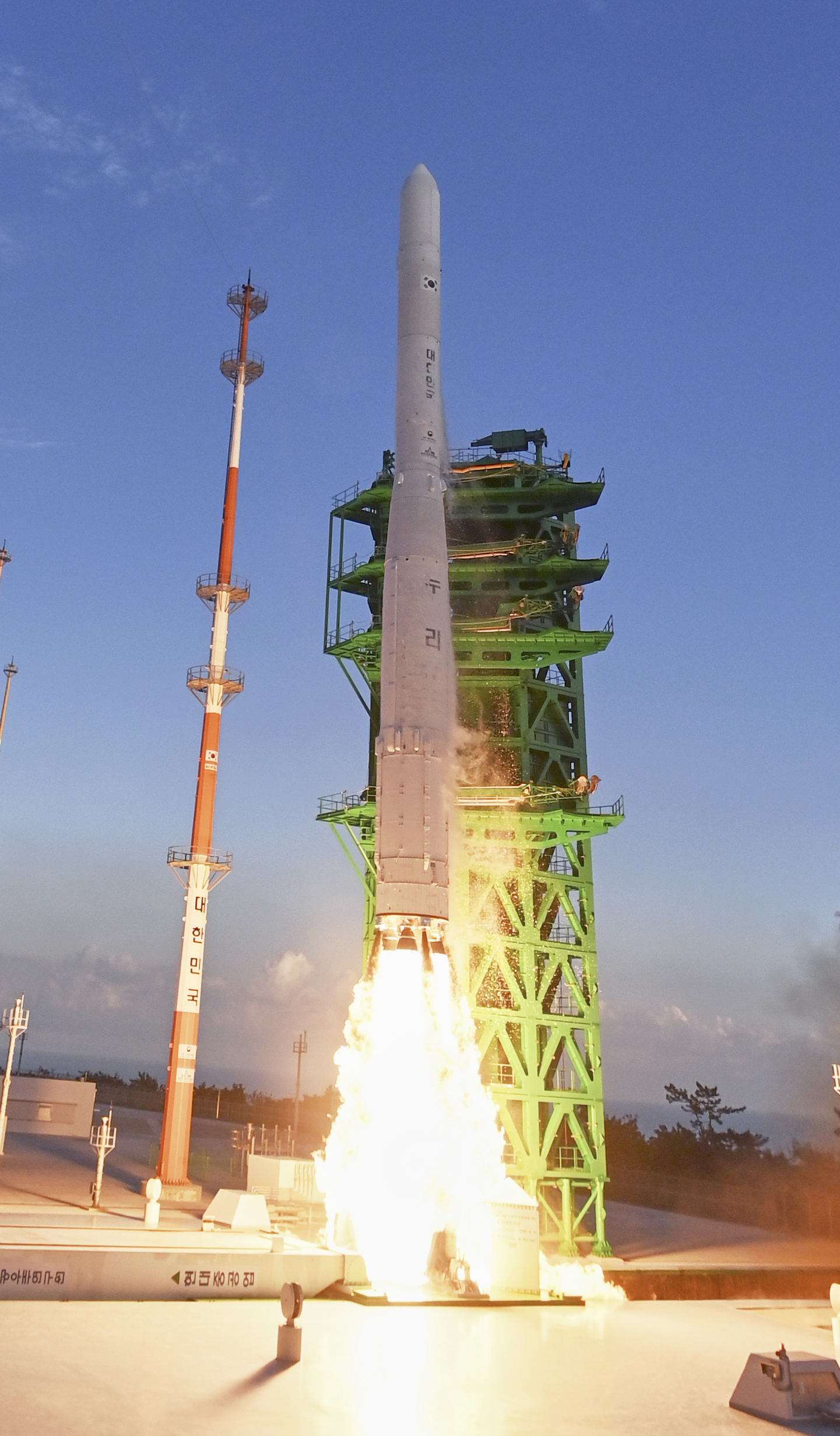
- Clockwise from top left: Falcon 9, Soyuz-2, LVM3, Nuri, H-IIA, Long March 2D

Class overview
- Name: Medium-lift launch vehicle
- Preceded by: Small-lift launch vehicle
- Succeeded by: Heavy-lift launch vehicle
- Built: Since 1958

General characteristics
- Capacity: US definition: 2,000 to 20,000 kg (4,400 to 44,100 lb); Russian definition: 5,000 to 20,000 kg (11,000 to 44,000 lb)

A medium-lift launch vehicle (MLV) is a rocket launch vehicle that is capable of lifting between 2,000 to 20,000 kg (4,400 to 44,100 lb) by NASA classification or between 5,000 to 20,000 kilograms (11,000 to 44,000 lb) by Russian classification of payload into low Earth orbit (LEO). An MLV is between a small-lift launch vehicle and a heavy-lift launch vehicle. Medium-lift vehicles comprise the majority of orbital launches as of 2024, with both the Soyuz and Falcon 9 having launched several hundred times.

== History ==
=== Soviet Union and Russia ===
The Soviet R-7 family was based on the world's first intercontinental ballistic missile (ICBM). Sputnik was a small-lift derivative that carried the first satellite into orbit, and the R-7 design quickly grew in capacity, with Luna launching in 1958. The 1960s saw the R-7 series continue to develop, with Vostok 1 carrying the first human into space, Voskhod carrying multiple crew members, and the first Soyuz. As of 2026, Soyuz variants are still operational and have launched over 1,100 times. The R-7 family has launched more times than any other family of orbital rockets.

=== United States ===
The first US medium-lift vehicle was a purpose-built orbital launch vehicle, the Saturn I. Saturn I first launched in 1961, and the Saturn family would eventually grow into the heavy-lift Saturn IB and the super-heavy lift Saturn V.

ICBM-derived launch vehicles for the US include the Atlas, Titan, and Delta families. Atlas-Centaur launched in 1962 and marked the first use of a Centaur upper stage. As of 2025, the derivative Atlas V is still operational; Centaur has seen extensive use on multiple vehicles and is operational on the Atlas V and Vulcan vehicles. Titan II GLV carried the Gemini spacecraft. The family was further developed into Titan III which utilized solid rocket boosters (SRBs), and in 1989, the heavy-lift Titan IV. Medium-lift versions of the Delta family include Delta II which utilized up to nine SRBs, and the Delta IV which could use optional SRBs or three first-stage cores as a heavy variant.

SpaceX introduced the Falcon 9 in 2010, designed to be a partially reusable launch vehicle. Falcon 9 underwent iterative upgrades and completed the first propulsive landing of an orbital rocket stage in 2015. SpaceX then began regularly reusing first stages. In 2022, Falcon 9 broke the record of 47 launches in one year held by Soyuz-U. Falcon 9 has since continued to set new launch cadence records, launching 165 times in 2025.

=== Other ===
China's Long March family and the European Ariane family were introduced in the 1970s. Japan launched the H-I in 1986 before developing the H-II and H3. India introduced the PSLV in 1993 and LVM3 in 2014. South Korea's Nuri reached orbit in 2022.

== Rated launch vehicles ==
=== Operational ===
This list is sorted by default by the number of launches.

Vehicle	Origin	Manufacturer	Mass to LEO (kg)	Mass to other orbits (kg)	Launches	First Flight
Falcon 9 Block 5 (Note: When launched with an expendable first stage, Falcon 9 Block 5 has the capacity of a heavy-lift launch vehicle)	United States	SpaceX	22,800 (expendable); 18,500 (reusable)	7,350 to GTO (reusable); 8,300 to GTO (expendable); 4,020 to Mars	638	2018
Soyuz-2	Russia	Progress	8,200	3,250 to GTO; 4,400 to SSO	170	2006 (Note: A suborbital test flight was conducted in 2004, without the upper stage.)
Long March 4B/4C	China	SAST	4,200	1,500 to GTO; 2,800 to SSO	117	1999
Long March 3B/E	China	CALT	11,500	5,500 to GTO; 6,900 to SSO	117	2007
Atlas V	United States	ULA	18,850	8,900 to GTO	110	2002
Long March 2D	China	SAST	3,500	1,300 to SSO	106	1992
Long March 2C	China	CALT	3,850	1,900 to SSO	88	1982
PSLV	India	ISRO	3,800	1,200 to GTO; 1,750 to SSO	64	1993
Long March 2F	China	CALT	8,400	3,500 to GTO	29	1999
Long March 7/7A	China	CALT	13,500	5,500 to SSO; 7,000 to GTO	29	2016
Long March 3A	China	CALT	6,000	2,600 to GTO; 5,000 to SSO	27	1994
Long March 3C	China	CALT	9,100	3,800 to GTO; 6,500 to SSO	20	2008
GSLV	India	ISRO	5,000	2,700 to GTO	19	2010
Long March 8/8A	China	CALT	8,100	4,500 to SSO	18	2020
H3	Japan	Mitsubishi	16,000	7,900 to GTO; 4,000 to SSO	10	2023
Zhuque-2	China	LandSpace	6,000	4,000 to SSO (500 km)	10	2022
LVM3	India	ISRO	10,000	4,000 to GTO	9	2017 (Note: A suborbital test flight was conducted in 2014, without the upper stage.)
Long March 12	China	CALT	10,000	6,000 to SSO	9	2024
Ariane 6 (Note: When launched with four solid rocket boosters, Ariane 6 has the capacity of a heavy-lift launch vehicle)	France; Europe (Note: The lead manufacturer is from France, but the rocket has significant contributions from companies based in Germany, Italy, Spain, Belgium, Austria, Switzerland and Sweden.)	Ariane Group	10,350 (Note: When launched with two solid rocket boosters)	4,500 to GTO	9	2024
Vega C	Italy; Europe (Note: The lead manufacturer is from Italy, but the rocket has significant contributions from companies based in Belgium, France, Netherlands, Spain, Switzerland and Ukraine.)	Avio	2,300	2,300 to SSO	8	2022
Angara 1.2	Russia	Khrunichev	3,500		7	2022
Nuri	South Korea	KARI	3,300	1,900 to SSO (700 km)	5	2022 (Note: A flight in 2021 failed to reach orbit.)
Vulcan Centaur (Note: Vulcan is often considered a heavy-lift launch vehicle and is capable of carrying over 20,000 kg to LEO when using four or six solid rocket boosters)	United States	ULA	19,000 (VC2) (Note: two solid rocket boosters); 10,800 (VC0) (Note: zero solid rocket boosters)	8,400 to GTO (VC2); 3,500 to GTO (VC0)	4	2024
Gravity-1	China	Orienspace	6,500	4,000 to SSO	4	2024
Long March 6C	China	CALT	4,500	2,400 to SSO	2	2024
Zhuque-3	China	LandSpace	11,000 – 20,000		2	2025
Long March 12A	China	CALT	9,000 (expendable); 6,000 (reusable)		1	2025
Pallas-1	China	Galactic Energy	5,000	3,000 to SSO	1	2026
Tianlong-3	China	Space Pioneer	17,000	14,000 to SSO	1	2026
Soyuz-5	Russia	Progress	18,000	5,000 to GTO	1	2026

=== Under development ===
Vehicle	Origin	Manufacturer	Mass to LEO (kg)	Mass to other orbits (kg)	Expected Flight
Neutron	New Zealand; United States	Rocket Lab	8,500 – 15,000		2028
Eclipse	United States	Firefly/Northrop Grumman	14,000		2029
Hyperbola-3	China	i-Space	13,400 (expendable); 8,500 (reusable)		2027
Nova	United States	Stoke Space	7,000 (expendable); 3,000 (reusable)	2,500 to GTO; 1,250 to TLI	2027
NGLV	India	ISRO	4,500 – 15,000	1,500 – 6,000 to GTO	2031
Long March 10A	China	CALT	14,000		2027
Pallas-2	China	Galactic Energy	14,000		TBA
KSLV-III	South Korea	Hanwha Aerospace	10,000	7,000 to SSO	2030

=== Retired ===
Vehicle	Origin	Manufacturer (Note: Some vehicles were made by multiple manufacturers during their lifespan due to mergers and acquisitions. For brevity, only the final manufacturer is shown.)	Mass to LEO (kg)	Mass to other orbits (kg)	Launches	First Flight	Last Flight
Vostok	Soviet Union	RSC Energia	4,730		163	1958	1991
Saturn I	United States	Chrysler & Douglas	9,000		10	1961	1965
Atlas-Centaur	United States	Lockheed	5,100		61	1962	1983
Titan II GLV	United States	Martin	3,580		12	1964	1966
Titan IIIC	United States	Martin	13,100	3,000 to GTO; 1,200 to TMI	36	1965	1982
Molniya-M	Soviet Union; Russia	Progress	2,400		280	1965	2010
Proton-K (Note: Proton is usually considered to be a heavy-lift launch vehicle)	Soviet Union; Russia	Khrunichev	19,760		311	1965	2012
Soyuz original	Soviet Union	OKB-1	6,450		32	1966	1975
R-36 Tsyklon	Soviet Union; Ukraine	Yuzhmash	2,820–5,250	500–910 to GTO	236	1967	2009
Soyuz-L	Soviet Union	OKB-1	5,500		3	1970	1971
Titan IIID	United States	Martin	12,300		22	1971	1982
Soyuz-M	Soviet Union	OKB-1	6,600		8	1971	1976
Soyuz-U	Soviet Union; Russia	Progress	6,900		786	1973	2017
Feng Bao 1	China	SAST	2,500		8	1973	1981
Long March 2A	China	CALT	2,000		4	1974	1976
Titan IIIE	United States	Martin Marietta	15,400	3,700 to TMI	7	1974	1977
Delta 3920–5920	United States	McDonnell Douglas	3,452–3,848		30	1980	1990
N-II	Japan	Mitsubishi	2,000		8	1981	1987
Soyuz-U2	Soviet Union	Progress	7,050		72	1982	1995
Atlas G	United States	Lockheed	5,900		7	1984	1989
Long March 3	China	CALT	5,000	1,340 to GTO	14	1984	2000
Zenit-2	Soviet Union; Ukraine	Yuzhnoye	13,740		36	1985	2004
H-I	Japan	Mitsubishi	3,200	1,100 to GTO	9	1986	1992
Long March 4A	China	SAST	4,000		2	1988	1990
Ariane 4	France; Europe (Note: The lead manufacturer is from France, but the rocket has significant contributions from companies based across Europe.)	Aérospatiale	7,600	4,800 to GTO	116	1988	2003
Delta II	United States	ULA	6,100	2,170 to GTO; 1,000 to HCO	156	1989	2018
Atlas I, II, III	United States	Lockheed	5,900–8,686	2,340–4,609 to GTO	80	1990	2005
Long March 2E	China	CALT	9,200		7	1990	1995
H-II / IIS	Japan	Mitsubishi	10,060	4,000 to GTO	7	1994	1999
Long March 3B	China	CALT	11,200	5,100 to GTO; 5,700 to SSO	12	1996	2012
Delta III	United States	Boeing	8,290	3,810 to GTO	3	1998	2000
Dnepr	Ukraine	Yuzhmash	4,500	2,300 to GTO; 550 to TLI	22	1999	2015
Soyuz-FG	Russia	Progress	6,900		70	2001	2019
Soyuz-2.1v	Russia	Progress	2,800	1,400 to SSO	13	2013	2025
H-IIA	Japan	Mitsubishi	15,000	6,000 to GTO	50	2001	2025
GSLV Mk.I	India	ISRO	4,000	2,150 to GTO	6	2001	2010
H-IIB	Japan	Mitsubishi	19,000	8,000 to GTO	9	2009	2020
Falcon 9 v1.0	United States	SpaceX	10,450	4,540 to GTO	5	2010	2013
Antares 110/120/130	United States	Orbital	5,100	1,500 to SSO	5	2013	2014
Falcon 9 v1.1	United States	SpaceX	13,150	4,850 to GTO	15	2013	2016
Falcon 9 Full Thrust Blocks 3 and 4 (Note: When launched with an expendable first stage, Falcon 9 Full Thrust has the capacity of a heavy-lift launch vehicle)	United States	SpaceX	15,600+	7,075+ to GTO	36	2015	2018
Antares 230/230+	United States	Northrop Grumman	8,000	3,000 to SSO	13	2016	2023
Zenit	Ukraine	Yuzhmash	7,000	6,160 to GTO	84	1985	2017

== See also ==
- Comparison of orbital launch systems
- Comparison of orbital rocket engines
- Comparison of space station cargo vehicles
- List of orbital launch systems
- Sounding rocket, suborbital launch vehicle
- Small-lift launch vehicle, capable of lifting up to 2,000 kg (4,400 lb) to low Earth orbit
- Heavy-lift launch vehicle, capable of lifting between 20,000 and 50,000 kg (44,000 and 110,000 lb) to low Earth orbit
- Super heavy-lift launch vehicle, capable of lifting more than 50,000 kg (110,000 lb) to Low Earth orbit
