= Kuaizhou =

Family of Chinese "quick-reaction" orbital launch vehicles

Kuaizhou (KZ, Chinese: 快舟; pinyin: kuàizhōu, meaning "speedy vessel") (also called Feitian Emergency Satellite Launch System, Feitian-1, FT-1) is a family of Chinese "quick-reaction" orbital launch vehicles. The Kuaizhou series of rockets is manufactured by ExPace, a subsidiary of China Aerospace Science and Industry Corporation (CASIC), as their commercial launch vehicles.

Flying since 2013, Kuaizhou 1 and 1A consist of three solid-fueled rocket stages, with a liquid-fueled fourth stage as part of the satellite system. Kuaizhou 11, which flew an unsuccessful maiden flight in July 2020 (and successful second flight in 2022), is a larger model able to launch a 1,500 kg (3,300 lb) payload into low Earth orbit. Heavy-lift models KZ-21 and KZ-31 are in development.

== History ==
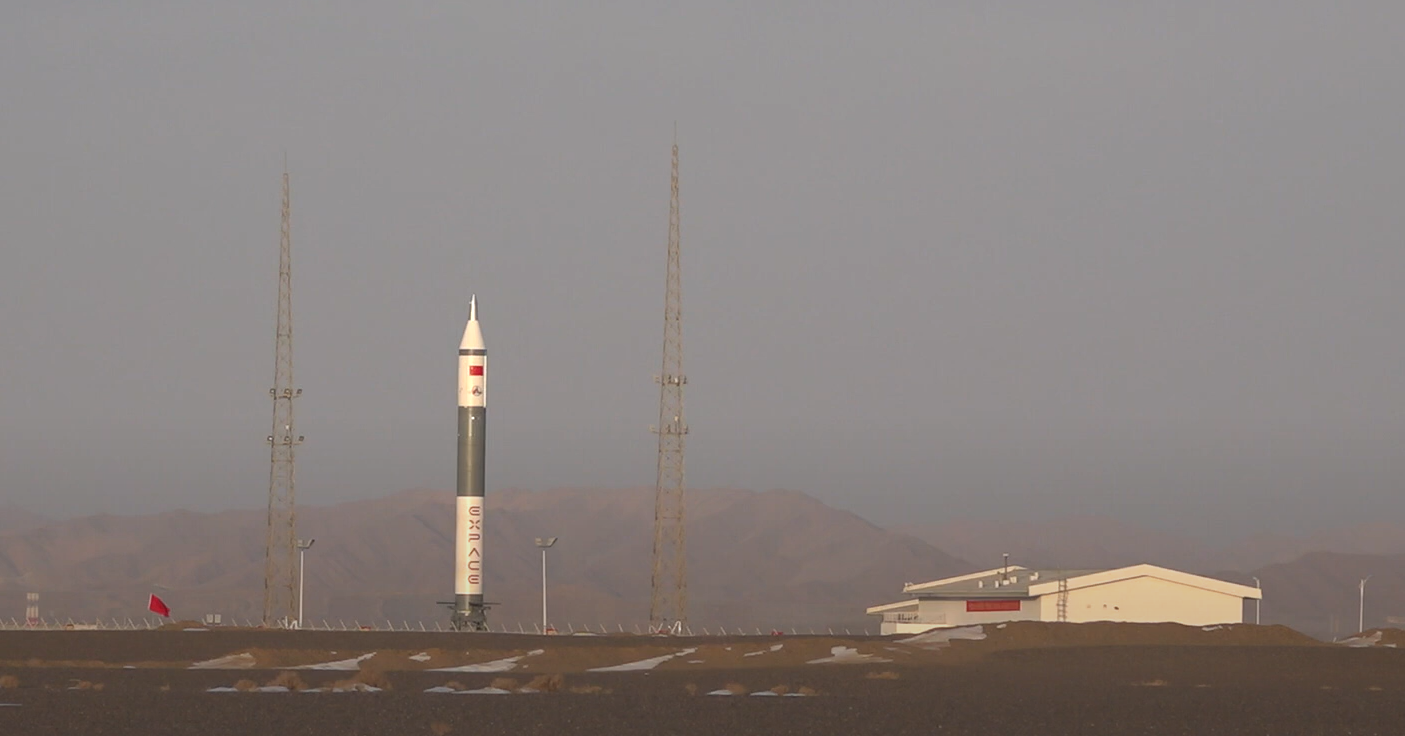
Kuaizhou 11 Y2 carrier rocket pre-launch

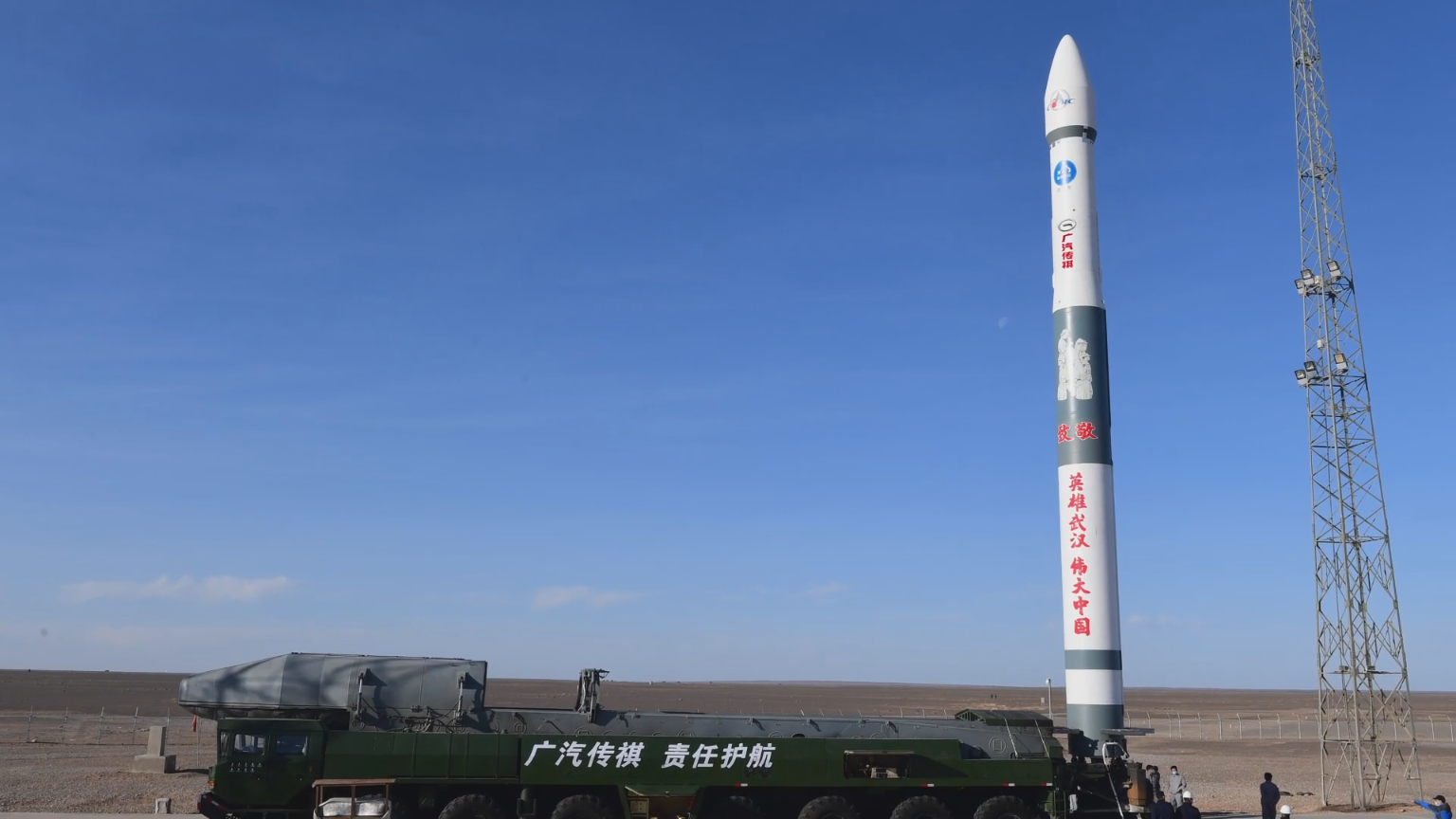
Kuaizhou 1A Y6 on the transporter erector launcher prior to launch, 12 May 2020

The rocket series is based on CASIC's Anti-satellite weapon (ASAT) and BMD mid-course interceptor rockets, in particular the DF-21 Intermediate-range ballistic missile (IRBM) (another Chinese rocket that was based on DF-21 was the Kaituozhe-1). Development on the KZ launch vehicles started in 2009. The Kuaizhou launch vehicles were to provide an integrated launch vehicle system with the rapid ability to replace Chinese satellites that might be damaged or destroyed in an act of aggression in orbit. The vehicle uses mobile launch platform. The launch vehicle is operated by the PLA Rocket Force.

The maiden flight of Kuaizhou 1 launch vehicle, orbiting the Kuaizhou 1 natural disaster monitoring satellite, occurred on 25 September 2013, launched from Jiuquan Satellite Launch Center.

Second flight of Kuaizhou 1 launch vehicle, orbiting the Kuaizhou 2 natural disaster monitoring satellite, was launched at 06:37 UTC on 21 November 2014, again from Jiuquan Satellite Launch Center.

The first commercial launch inaugurated the Kuaizhou 1A version on 9 January 2017, from Jiuquan Satellite Launch Center. It placed three small satellites into a polar orbit.

The maiden launch of Kuaizhou 11 was on 10 July 2020. The launch was a failure, and the rocket was initially declared retired in April 2022, but later that year it was revealed that a second launch was planned for December. The successful launch of Kuaizhou 11 on 7 December 2022 marked the rocket's return to service.

== Specifications ==
The solid-fuel KZ-1A can place 200 kg payload into a Sun-synchronous orbit at an altitude of 700 kilometres. The KZ-11 version is able to put 1000 kg to the same orbit.

Launch preparations are designed to take very little time, and the launch can be conducted on rough terrain. The rocket's low requirements for launch help with cost savings, yielding a launch price under US$10,000 per kilogram of payload. This price level is very competitive in the international market.

Satellites can be installed on a Kuaizhou launch vehicle and stored in a maintenance facility. Once needed, the launch vehicle is deployed by a Transporter erector launcher (TEL) vehicle to a secure location. Launch readiness time can be as short as several hours.

=== Models ===
Rocket	First launch	Last Launch	Payload fairing size	Payload to LEO	Payload to SSO	Lift-off mass	Length	Diameter	Thrust	Payload cost
Kuaizhou 1 (KZ-1)	25 September 2013	21 November 2014			430 kg (950 lb) (500 km)	30–32 tonnes	19.4 m (64 ft)	1.4 m (4 ft 7 in)		
Kuaizhou 1A (KZ-1A)	9 January 2017		1.2–1.4 m (3 ft 11 in – 4 ft 7 in)	400 kg (880 lb)	250 kg (550 lb) (500 km); 200 kg (440 lb) (700 km)	30 tonnes, TEL-capable	19.4 m (64 ft)	1.4 m (4 ft 7 in)		$20,000/kg ($9,100/lb)
Kuaizhou 1A Pro (KZ-1A Pro)	4 December 2024		1.8 m (5 ft 11 in)	450 kg (990 lb)	360 kg (790 lb) (500 km)			1.4 m (4 ft 7 in)		
Kuaizhou 11 (KZ-11)	10 July 2020		2.2–2.6 m (7 ft 3 in – 8 ft 6 in)	1,500 kg (3,300 lb)	1,000 kg (2,200 lb) (700 km)	78 tonnes, TEL-capable		2.2 m (7 ft 3 in)		$10,000/kg ($4,500/lb)
Kuaizhou 6 (KZ-6) (reusable methalox 1st stage)	2027 (projected)			20,000 kg (44,000 lb)						
Kuaizhou 12 (KZ-12) (solid 1st stage, methalox 2nd stage)	2027 (projected)			10,000 kg (22,000 lb)						$2,990/kg ($1,360/lb)

== List of launches ==
Flight No.	Date (UTC)	Launch site	Version; Flight number	Payload	Orbit	Result
1	25 September 2013; 04:37	Jiuquan, LS-95A	Kuaizhou 1 Y1	Kuaizhou 1	SSO	Success
2	21 November 2014; 06:37	Jiuquan, LS-95B	Kuaizhou 1 Y2	Kuaizhou 2	SSO	Success
3	9 January 2017; 04:11	Jiuquan, LS-95A	Kuaizhou 1A; Y1	Jilin-1-03	SSO	Success
4	29 September 2018; 04:13	Jiuquan, LS-95A	Kuaizhou 1A; Y8	Centispace 1-S1	SSO	Success
5	30 August 2019; 23:41	Jiuquan, LS-95A	Kuaizhou 1A; Y10	KX-09	SSO	Success
6	13 November 2019; 03:40	Jiuquan, LS-95A	Kuaizhou 1A; Y11	Jilin-1-02A	SSO	Success
7	17 November 2019; 09:52	Jiuquan, LS-95A	Kuaizhou 1A; Y7	KL-Alpha A and B	LEO	Success
8	7 December 2019; 02:55	Taiyuan, LC-16	Kuaizhou 1A; Y2	Jilin-1-02B	SSO	Success
9	7 December 2019; 08:52	Taiyuan, LC-16	Kuaizhou 1A; Y12	HEAD-2 A/B, SPACETY-16/17, Tianqi-4 A/B	SSO	Success
10	16 January 2020; 03:02	Jiuquan, LS-95A	Kuaizhou 1A; Y9	Yinhe-1	LEO	Success
11	12 May 2020; 01:16	Jiuquan, LS-95A	Kuaizhou 1A; Y6	Xingyun 2-01 and Xingyun 2-02	LEO	Success
12	10 July 2020; 04:17	Jiuquan, LS-95A	Kuaizhou 11; Y1	Jilin-1-02E and Centispace-1-S2	SSO	Failure
13	12 September 2020; 05:02	Jiuquan, LS-95A	Kuaizhou 1A; Y3	Jilin-1 Gaofen-02C	SSO	Failure
14	27 September 2021; 06:19	Jiuquan, LS-95A	Kuaizhou 1A; Y4	Jilin-1 Gaofen-02D	SSO	Success
15	27 October 2021; 06:19	Jiuquan, LS-95A	Kuaizhou 1A; Y5	Jilin-1 Gaofen-02F	SSO	Success
16	24 November 2021; 23:41	Jiuquan, LS-95A	Kuaizhou 1A; Y13	Shiyan 11	SSO	Success
17	15 December 2021; 02:00	Jiuquan, LS-95A	Kuaizhou 1A; Y17	GeeSAT-1A/1B	LEO	Failure
18	22 June 2022; 02:08	Jiuquan, LS-95A	Kuaizhou 1A; Y23	Tianxing-1	LEO	Success
19	23 August 2022; 02:36	Xichang	Kuaizhou 1A; Y15	Chuangxin-16 A/B	LEO	Success
20	6 September 2022; 02:24	Jiuquan, LS-95A	Kuaizhou 1A; Y16	Centispace 1-S3/S4	LEO	Success
21	24 September 2022; 22:55	Taiyuan, LC-16	Kuaizhou 1A; Y14	Shiyan 14/Shiyan 15	SSO	Success
22	7 December 2022; 01:15	Jiuquan, LS-95A	Kuaizhou 11; Y2	Xingyun Jiaotong VDES	SSO	Success
23	22 March 2023; 09:09	Jiuquan, LS-95A	Kuaizhou 1A; Y19	Tianmu-1 03–06	SSO	Success
24	9 June 2023; 02:35	Jiuquan, LS-95A	Kuaizhou 1A; Y20	Longjiang-3	LEO	Success
25	20 July 2023; 03:20	Jiuquan, LS-95A	Kuaizhou 1A; Y22	Tianmu-1 07–10	SSO	Success
26	14 August 2023; 05:32	Xichang (Mobile Launcher Pad)	Kuaizhou 1A; Y21	Jiaotong 06–10 (HEAD 3A–3E)	LEO	Success
27	25 December 2023; 01:00	Jiuquan, LS-95A	Kuaizhou 1A; Y26	Tianmu-1 11–14	SSO	Success
28	27 December 2023; 06:50	Jiuquan, LS-95A	Kuaizhou 1A; Y27	Tianmu-1 19–22	SSO	Success
29	5 January 2024; 11:20	Jiuquan, LS-95A	Kuaizhou 1A; Y28	Tianmu-1 15–18	SSO	Success
30	11 January 2024; 03:52	Jiuquan, LS-95A	Kuaizhou 1A; Y24	Tianxing-1 02	SSO	Success
31	21 May 2024; 04:15	Jiuquan, LS-95B	Kuaizhou 11; Y4	Wuhan-1, VLEO test satellite, Tianyan-22, Lingque-3-01	SSO	Success
32	20 September 2024; 09:43	Xichang, (Mobile Launcher Pad)	Kuaizhou 1A; Y31	Tianqi 29-32 (4 satellites)	LEO	Success
33	4 December 2024; 04:46	Xichang, (Mobile Launcher Pad)	Kuaizhou 1A Pro; Y30	Haishao-1	LEO	Success
34	1 March 2025; 10:00	Jiuquan, LS-95A	Kuaizhou 1A; Y33	Unknown Payload	SSO	Failure
35	31 July 2025; 02:00	Xichang, (Mobile Launcher Pad)	Kuaizhou 1A Pro; Y34	PRSC-S1	LEO	Success
36	5 December 2025; 09:00	Jiuquan, LS-95A	Kuaizhou 1A Pro; Y	Jiaotong VDES A & B	LEO	Success
37	13 December 2025; 01:08	Jiuquan, LS-95A	Kuaizhou 11; Y8	DEAR-5	LEO	Success
38	16 March 2026; 04:12	Jiuquan, LS-95A	Kuaizhou 11; Y7	8 Satellites	SSO	Success
39	17 June 2026; 03:58	Jiuquan, LS-95A	Kuaizhou 11; Y13	CentiSpace-1 Group 05	LEO	Success
40	17 September 2026; 02:40	Jiuquan, LS-95A	Kuaizhou 11; Y3	Tianyi 51/52	LEO	Success

== Launch Statistics ==
=== Kuaizhou configurations ===
- Kuaizhou 1
- Kuaizhou 1A
- Kuaizhou 11

=== Launch sites ===
- Jiuquan
- Xichang
- Taiyuan

=== Launch outcomes ===
- Success
- Partial failure
- Failure
- Planned

== See also ==
- Kaituozhe-1, a previous Chinese small lift orbital launcher based on the DF-21 IRBM.
- China National Space Administration
- ExPace
- Long March (rocket family)
- Space program of China
- Small-lift launch vehicle
