= Kinetica 1 =

Orbital launch vehicle by CAS Space

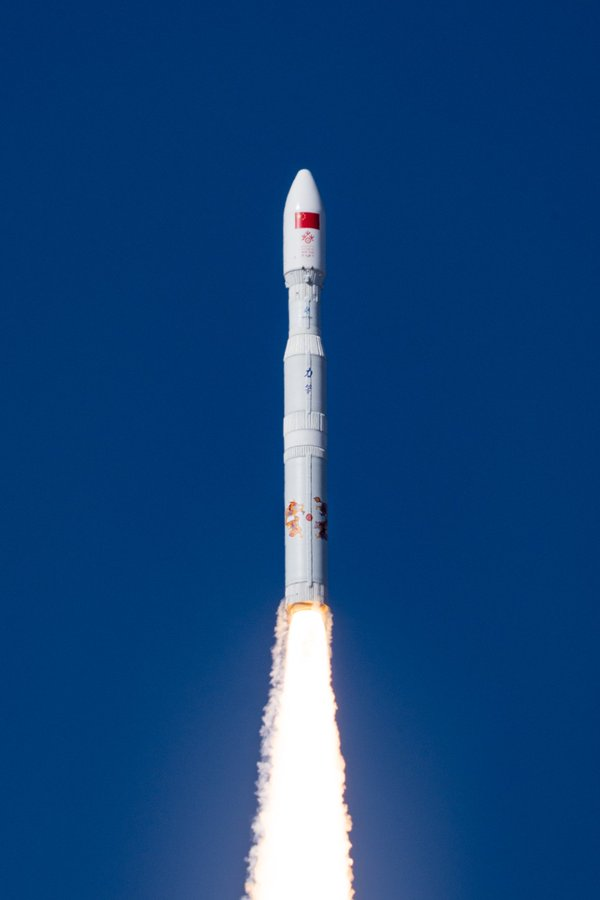
- Kinetica 1 launching on its third flight in 2024.
- Function: Orbital launch vehicle
- Manufacturer: CAS Space
- Country of origin: China

Size
- Height: 29.7 m (97 ft)
- Diameter: 2.65 m (8 ft 8 in)
- Mass: 135 t (298,000 lb)
- Stages: 4

Capacity

Payload to LEO
- Mass: 2,000 kg (4,400 lb)

Payload to SSO
- Mass: 1,500 kg (3,300 lb)

Launch history
- Status: Active
- Launch sites: Jiuquan Satellite Launch Center; Sea Launch Platform
- Total launches: 16
- Success(es): 15
- Failure: 1
- Partial failure: 0
- First flight: 27 July 2022
- Last flight: 20 September 2026

First stage – SP70
- Powered by: 1 solid
- Maximum thrust: 2,066.8 kilonewtons (464,600 lb_{f})
- Propellant: Solid

Second stage
- Powered by: 1 solid
- Maximum thrust: 1,081.2 kilonewtons (243,100 lb_{f})
- Propellant: Solid

Third stage
- Powered by: 1 solid
- Maximum thrust: 439.3 kilonewtons (98,800 lb_{f})
- Propellant: Solid

Fourth stage
- Powered by: 1 solid
- Maximum thrust: 78 kilonewtons (18,000 lb_{f})
- Propellant: Solid

Kinetica 1 (Chinese: 力箭一号; pinyin: Lìjiàn yī hào; lit. 'Powerful Rocket-1', also known as Lijian-1, LJ-1) is a Chinese small-lift orbital launch vehicle developed by CAS Space.

== Design ==
Kinetica 1 is 30 m (98 ft) tall, 2.65 m (8 ft 8 in) in diameter and weighs 135 t (133 long tons; 149 short tons). It consists of four solid-fuel stages. It is capable of lifting 1.5 t (1.5 long tons; 1.7 short tons) to a 500 km (310 mi) Sun-synchronous orbit (SSO) or 2 t (2.0 long tons; 2.2 short tons) to low Earth orbit (LEO).

== History ==
CAS Space conducted ground tests for the four-stage Kinetica 1 in November 2021. Its maiden flight was conducted from the Jiuquan Satellite Launch Center (JSLC) on 27 July 2022, sending 6 satellites into SSO.

== Launch statistics ==
=== Launch outcomes ===
- Failure
- Partial failure
- Success
- Planned

== Launches ==
Flight number	Serial number	Date (UTC)	Launch site	Payload	Orbit	Result	Note
1	Y1	27 July 2022; 04:12	LS-130, JSLC	SATech 01; Dianci Zuzhuang Shiyan × 2 GNSS-R; Jinan-1; Nanyue Science Satellite	SSO	Success	Maiden flight of Kinetica 1
2	Y2	7 June 2023; 04:10	LS-130, JSLC	Shiyan 24A/B; Fucheng-1; Xi'an Hangtou-8; CXPD (X Shexian Pianzheng Lifang); Tianyi 26; 20 undisclosed satellites	SSO	Success	
3	Y3	23 January 2024; 04:03	LS-130, JSLC	Taijing-1-03; Taijing-2-02; Taijing-2-04; Taijing-3-02; Taijing-4-03	SSO	Success	
4	Y4	24 September 2024; 23:33	LS-130, JSLC	Zhongke-01/02; Jilin-1 SAR-01A; Yunyao-21/22	SSO	Success	
5	Y5	11 November 2024; 04:03	LS-130, JSLC	Shiyan-26 A, B, C Jilin-1 Gaofen-05B; Jilin-1 Pingtai-02A 03; Yunyao-1 31-36; Xiguang-1 04, 05; OmanSat 1 Tianyan-24	SSO	Success	
6	Y6	27 December 2024; 01:03	LS-130, JSLC	Dier-3 (B300-L01); Yunyao-1 × 6 Yinglong 1 Yangwang 2 Yixian A CASAA-Sat	SSO	Failure	Third stage instability.
7	Y7	21 May 2025; 04:05	LS-130, JSLC	Taijing-3 04; Taijing-4 02A; Xingrui-11; Xingjiyuan-1; Lifangti-108 001; Xiguang-1 02 (Tanli)	SSO	Success	
8	Y10	19 August 2025; 07:33	LS-130, JSLC	AIRSAT 05 (Hashiao-2/Zhongke-05); Duogongneng Shiyan 2-01; Duogongneng Shiyan 2-02; Duogongneng Shiyan 2-03 (Tiantuo 6); Tianyan-26 (Henan Ligong-2); Thumbsat-1; Thumbsat-2	SSO	Success	
9	Y8	19 October 2025; 03:33	LS-130, JSLC	PRSC-HS1; AIRSAT-03 (Zhongke 03); AIRSAT-04 (Zhongke 04)	SSO	Success	
10	Y9	9 November 2025; 03:32	LS-130, JSLC	Chutian-2 01; Chutian-2 02	SSO	Success	
11	Y11	10 December 2025; 04:03	LS-130, JSLC	Satellite 813 (United Arab Emirates); Jilin-1 Gaofen 07B-01/07C-01/07D-01; Dongpo-15; Yixing-2 09; Yixian-A; SPNEX (Egypt); Slipper2Sat (Nepal)	SSO	Success	Payload deployment was reported as not being coordinated with other satellite operators, leading to a near-collision with a Starlink satellite.
12	Y12	14 April 2026; 04:03	LS-130, JSLC	Jilin-1 Gaofen 07 A02 x 8	SSO	Success	
13	Y13	15 May 2026; 04:33	LS-130, JSLC	Taijing-3 05A; Taijing-3 05B; Tianyi 50; Tianyan 27; Jilin-1 Gaofen 05D55	SSO	Success	
14	Y14	15 June 2026; 03:44	LS-130, JSLC	Jilin-1 Gaofen-04D 01-02; Jilin-1 Gaofen-05D 01-02; Jilin-1 Gaofen-07C 04; Jilin-1 Gaofen-07D 02-04	SSO	Success	
15	Y15	23 July 2026; 23:33	LS-130, JSLC	5 Satellites	SSO	Success	
16	Y18	20 September 2026; 04:03	LS-130, JSLC	QinLing 01, 02 + 7 other Satellites	SSO	Success	
17	Y?	29 November 2026; 01:00	Special converted barge (Dong Fang Hang Tian Gang); Offshore waters of Haiyang Port	Unknown Payload	SSO	Planned	First sea launch of Kinetica 1.

== See also ==
- Comparison of orbital launcher families
- Comparison of orbital launch systems
- Expendable launch system
- Lists of rockets
