= Hyperbola-1 =

Chinese satellite launch vehicle

- Function: Launch vehicle
- Manufacturer: i-Space
- Country of origin: China
- Cost per launch: US$5 million

Size
- Height: 24 m (79 ft)
- Diameter: 1.4 m (4 ft 7 in)
- Mass: 42,000 kg (93,000 lb)
- Stages: 4

Capacity

Payload to Low Earth orbit
- Mass: 300 kg (660 lb)

Payload to SSO
- Mass: 260 kg (570 lb)

Associated rockets
- Comparable: Ceres-1, Minotaur IV

Launch history
- Status: Active
- Launch sites: JSLC
- Total launches: 8
- Success(es): 4
- Failure: 4
- Partial failure: 0
- First flight: 25 July 2019
- Last flight: 29 July 2025

First stage
- Powered by: 1 Solid
- Maximum thrust: 770 kilonewtons (170,000 lb_{f})
- Burn time: 56 seconds
- Propellant: Solid

Second stage
- Powered by: 1 Solid
- Maximum thrust: 597 kilonewtons (134,000 lb_{f})
- Burn time: 60 seconds
- Propellant: Solid

Third stage
- Powered by: 1 Solid
- Maximum thrust: 195 kilonewtons (44,000 lb_{f})
- Burn time: 56 seconds
- Propellant: Solid

Fourth stage
- Powered by: 1 Solid
- Maximum thrust: 60 kilonewtons (13,000 lb_{f})
- Burn time: 50 seconds
- Propellant: Solid

The Hyperbola-1 (aka Shuangquxian-1, SQX-1) (Chinese: 双曲线一号) rocket is 20.8 m (68 ft) tall, 1.4 m (4 ft 7 in) in diameter and weighs 31 t (34 tons). It consists of four all solid fuel stages, guided by liquid fuel attitude control engines. It can launch 300 kg (660 lb) into low Earth orbit (LEO) and 260 kg (570 lb) into Sun synchronous orbit (SSO). The rocket might be based on Chinese military missiles (perhaps DF-11 or DF-15). The first stage of the rocket is equipped with four grid fins. The launch price is reported around US$5 million.

== History ==
The successful maiden flight was on 25 July 2019, at 05:00 UTC from Jiuquan Satellite Launch Center. It launched from a movable supporting platform. It placed numerous payloads, among them the CAS-7B amateur radio satellite, into orbit 300 km (190 mi) above Earth. CAS-7B decayed from orbit 6 August 2019. It was the first Chinese private company to achieve orbit (orbital launches of other private companies before had failed).

A second launch occurred on 1 February 2021, at 08:15 UTC (16:15 Beijing Time) from Jiuquan Satellite Launch Center with 6 unidentified satellites but failed to reach orbit. A subsequent investigation revealed that a piece of insulation had broken off and got stuck in the turning mechanism of grid fin Number IV. When the piece was blown away, the control system then suddenly overcompensated, resulting in the rocket being ripped apart by excessive aerodynamic forces. The rocket was named "Tianshu" because its outer fuselage was covered with the artistic creations (images of compound made-up Chinese characters) of the contemporary artist Xu Bing.

iSpace launched a third Hyperbola-1 solid-rocket vehicle on 3 August 2021. SpaceNews was reporting the same day that the outcome of the launch was unknown, but that amateur video of the launch had been posted, but then deleted from Chinese social media. After most of the day had passed, the Chinese official media Xinhua reported that the launch was unsuccessful due to off-nominal performance of the rocket which resulted in a failure to achieve orbit. An official statement released by the company itself the following day clarified that the failure was caused by a malfunctioning in the fairing separation process, that precluded the payload from reaching the target orbit. A fourth launch attempt on May 13, 2022, was unsuccessful as well.

In April 2023, i-Space performed a fifth launch of the Hyperbola-1 which successfully reached orbit without a payload, and then followed with another launch on 17 December 2023 that placed the DEAR-1 satellite from Chinese company Azspace into a 500 kilometre SSO orbit.

== Launches ==
The following table indicates the launches to date:

Flight number	Launch vehicle	Serial number	Date (UTC)	Launch site	Payload	Orbit	Results
1	Hyperbola-1	Y1	25 July 2019 05:00	LS-95A, JSLC	CAS-7B; Hangtian KKG Fazhang sat	LEO	Success
2	Hyperbola-1	Y2	1 February 2021 08:15	LS-95A, JSLC	undisclosed payloads	SSO	Failure
3	Hyperbola-1	Y5	3 August 2021 07:39	LS-95B, JSLC	Jilin-1 Mofang-01A	SSO	Failure
4	Hyperbola-1	Y4	13 May 2022 07:09	LS-95B, JSLC	Jilin-1 Mofang-01A (R); Golden Bauhinia-1 04	SSO	Failure
5	Hyperbola-1	Y6	7 April 2023 04:00	LS-95A, JSLC	Lianyungang (Dummy Payload)	SSO	Success
6	Hyperbola-1	Y7	17 December 2023 07:00	LS-95A, JSLC	Liangxi-1 (DEAR-1)	SSO	Success
7	Hyperbola-1	Y8	11 July 2024 07:00	LS-95A, JSLC	Yunyao-1 15-17	SSO	Failure
8	Hyperbola-1	Y10	29 July 2025 04:11	LS-95A, JSLC	Kunpeng-03	SSO	Success
9	Hyperbola-1	Y?	NET December 2025 04:00	LS-95A, JSLC	TBD		Planned
