= Ceres-1 =

Chinese launch vehicle

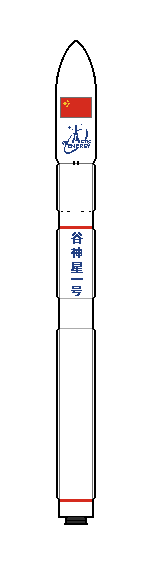
- Function: Launch vehicle
- Manufacturer: Galactic Energy
- Country of origin: China
- Cost per launch: US$4.5 million

Size
- Height: 20 m (66 ft)
- Diameter: 1.4 m (4 ft 7 in)
- Mass: 33,000 kg (73,000 lb)
- Stages: 4

Capacity

Payload to Low Earth orbit
- Mass: 400 kg (880 lb)

Associated rockets
- Comparable: Electron, Pegasus, Kuaizhou1A

Launch history
- Status: Active
- Launch sites: JSLC, and sea-launch platforms in water
- Total launches: 24
- Success(es): 22
- Failure: 2
- Partial failure: 0
- First flight: 7 November 2020
- Last flight: 21 October 2026

First stage – GS-1
- Powered by: 1 Solid
- Maximum thrust: 588 kilonewtons (132,000 lb_{f})
- Burn time: 73.9 seconds
- Propellant: Solid

Second stage – GS-2
- Powered by: 1 Solid
- Maximum thrust: 274.4 kilonewtons (61,700 lb_{f})
- Burn time: 70 seconds
- Propellant: Solid

Third stage – GS-3
- Powered by: 1 Solid
- Maximum thrust: 86.24 kilonewtons (19,390 lb_{f})
- Burn time: 69 seconds
- Propellant: Solid

Fourth stage – Advanced liquid upper stage
- Maximum thrust: 10 kilonewtons (2,200 lb_{f})
- Burn time: 600 seconds

Ceres-1 (Chinese: 谷神星一号; pinyin: Gǔshénxīng Yī-hào; lit. 'Ceres-1'), is a four-stage rocket manufactured and operated by Galactic Energy, the first three stages use solid-propellant rocket motors and the final stage uses a hydrazine propulsion system. It is about 20 m (62 ft) tall and 1.4 m (4 ft 7 in) in diameter. It can deliver 400 kg (880 lb) to low Earth orbit or 300 kg (660 lb) to 500 km Sun-synchronous orbit.

== History ==
The first launch of a Ceres-1 took place at 7 November 2020, successfully placing the Tianqi 11 (also transcribed Tiange, also known as TQ 11, and Scorpio 1, COSPAR 2020-080A) satellite in orbit. The satellite's mass was about 50 kg (110 lb) and its purpose was to function as an experimental satellite offering Internet of things (IoT) communications.

On 5 September 2023, the sea-launched version of the launch vehicle, designated Ceres-1S, made its debut successfully sending to orbit four Tianqi satellites. The launch took place from the DeFu 15002 converted barge (previously used also for launching the Long March 11 launch vehicle) off the coast of Haiyang.

A larger version of Ceres-1, named Ceres-2, is under development with a 3 to 4 times larger payload capacity.

== Launch statistics summary ==
- Failure
- Partial failure
- Success
- Planned

== Launches ==
Rocket & Serial	Date	Payload	Orbit	Launch site	Outcome	Remarks
Ceres-1 Y1	7 November 2020, 07:12	Tianqi-1 (Scorpio-1)	SSO	Jiuquan	Success	First flight of Ceres-1.
Ceres-1 Y2	7 December 2021, 04:12	Tianjin University-1 Lize-1 Baoyun Golden Bauhinia-5 Golden Bauhinia-1 03	SSO	Jiuquan	Success	
Ceres-1 Y3	9 August 2022, 04:11	Taijing-1 01 Taijing-1 02 Donghai-1	SSO	Jiuquan	Success	
Ceres-1 Y4	16 November 2022, 06:19	Jilin-1 Gaofen-03D 08 Jilin-1 Gaofen-03D 51 Jilin-1 Gaofen-03D 52 Jilin-1 Gaofen-03D 53 Jilin-1 Gaofen-03D 54	SSO	Jiuquan	Success	
Ceres-1 Y5	9 January 2023, 05:04	Nantong Zhongxue Tianmu-1 01 Tianmu-1 02 Xiamen Keji-1 Tianqi-13	SSO	Jiuquan	Success	
Ceres-1 Y6	22 July 2023, 05:07	Qiankun-1 Xingshidai-16 (Tai'an)	SSO	Jiuquan	Success	
Ceres-1 Y7	10 August 2023, 04:03	Diwei Zhineng Yingji-1 (Henan Ligong-1) Xi'an Hangtou × 4 Xiguang-1 01 Xingchi-1B	SSO	Jiuquan	Success	
Ceres-1 Y8	25 August 2023, 04:59	Jilin-1 Kuanfu-02A (HKUST-Xiongbin-1)	SSO	Jiuquan	Success	
Ceres-1S Y1	5 September 2023, 09:34	Tianqi-21 Tianqi-22 Tianqi-23 Tianqi-24	SSO	DeFu 15002 platform, Yellow Sea	Success	First sea-launch flight.
Ceres-1 Y11	21 September 2023, 04:59	Jilin-1 Gaofen-04B	SSO	Jiuquan	Failure	First Ceres-1 failure after 9 consecutive successful launches since 2020.
Ceres-1 Y9	5 December 2023, 23:33	Tianyan-16; Xingchi-1A	SSO	Jiuquan	Success	
Ceres-1S Y2	29 May 2024, 08:12	Tianqi-25; Tianqi-26; Tianqi-27; Tianqi-28	LEO	Special converted barge (Dong Fang Hang Tian Gang); Offshore waters of Rizhao, Yellow Sea	Success	
Ceres-1 Y12	30 May 2024, 23:39	Jiguang Xingzuo 01 & 02, Yunyao-1 14 (Hebei Linxi-1), Yunyao-1 25 (Zhangjiang Gaoke), Yunyao-1 26 (Nishuihan-2)	SSO	Jiuquan	Success	
Ceres-1 Y13	6 June 2024, 05:00	Eros; TEE-01B; Naxing-3 A & B	SSO	Jiuquan	Success	
Ceres-1S Y3	29 August 2024; 05:22	Yunyao-1 (15,16,17); Jitianxing A-03; Suxing 1-01; Tianfu Gaofen 2	SSO	Special converted barge (Dong Fang Hang Tian Gang); Offshore waters of Rizhao, Yellow Sea	Success	
Ceres-1S Y4	19 December 2024; 10:18	Tianqi 30-33	LEO	Special converted barge (Dong Fang Hang Tian Gang); Offshore waters of Rizhao, Yellow Sea	Success	
Ceres-1 Y16	20 January 2025; 10:11	Yunyao-1 37-40; Jitianxing A-05	SSO	Jiuquan	Success	
Ceres-1 Y10	17 March 2025; 08:07	Yunyao-1 55-60; AIRSAT-06 (Zhongke 06); AIRSAT-07 (Zhongke 07)	SSO	Jiuquan	Success	
Ceres-1 Y17	21 March 2025; 11:07	Yunyao-1 43-48	SSO	Jiuquan	Success	
Ceres-1S Y5	19 May 2025; 07:38	Tianqi 34-37	LEO	Special converted barge (Dong Fang Hang Tian Gang); Offshore waters of Rizhao, Yellow Sea	Success	
Ceres-1 Y15	5 September 2025; 11:39	Kaiyun-1; Yuxing-3 08; Yunyao-1 27	SSO	Jiuquan	Success	
Ceres-1 Y19	10 November 2025; 04:02	Jilin-1 Gaofen-04C; Jilin-1 Pingtai 02A-04; Zhongbei University-1	SSO	Jiuquan	Failure	4th stage shut down prematurely 510 seconds into the burn.
Ceres-1S Y7	15 January 2026; 20:10	Tianqi-1 38-41	LEO	Special converted barge (DeFu 15001); Offshore waters of Rizhao, Yellow Sea	Success	
Ceres-1S Y8	21 October 2026; 03:39	Xiguang IV-01	LEO	Special converted barge (Dong Fang Hang Tian Gang); Offshore waters of Rizhao, Yellow Sea	Success	
