= Gravity-1 =

Type of Chinese launch vehicle

Gravity-1 引力一号
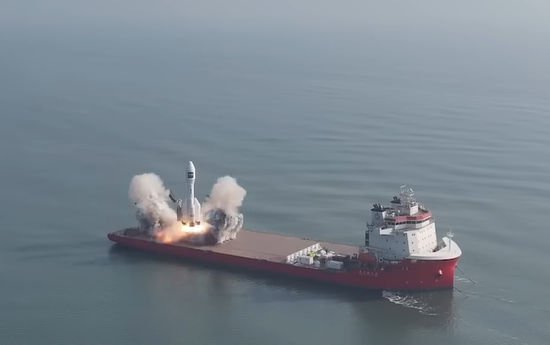
- Gravity-1 mission 1 launch 11 January 2024
- Function: expendable medium-lift launch vehicle
- Manufacturer: Orienspace
- Country of origin: China

Size
- Height: 29.4 metres (96 ft)
- Diameter: 2.65 metres (8.7 ft)
- Mass: 405 tonnes (893,000 lb)
- Stages: 3

Capacity

Payload to SSO (500km)
- Mass: 4,200 kg (9,300 lb)

Payload to LEO (200km)
- Mass: 6,500 kg (14,300 lb)

Launch history
- Status: Active
- Launch sites: China Dongfang Spacecraft Launch Port
- Total launches: 4
- Success(es): 4
- Failure: 0
- First flight: 11 January 2024
- Last flight: 15 September 2026

Gravity-1 (Chinese: 引力一号 or YinLi-1) is a solid-propellant expendable medium-lift launch vehicle designed, manufactured and launched by Chinese aerospace company Orienspace. It can carry a payload of up to 6.5 tonnes (14,000 lb) to LEO or 4.2 tonnes (9,300 lb) to SSO, enabling the deployment of large-scale satellite constellations. The rocket has a height of 30 meters (98 ft), a take-off weight of 400 tonnes (880,000 lb), a take-off thrust of 600 tonnes (1,300,000 lb), and a fairing diameter of 4.2 meters (14 ft). Its maiden launch was conducted from a sea launch platform in the Yellow Sea on January 11, 2024, breaking records as both the world's most powerful solid-fuel carrier rocket and China's most powerful commercial launch vehicle to date. Large pieces of debris were seen during the launch, which carried 3 Yunyao-1 meteorological satellites built by the Shanghai Academy of Spaceflight Technology, as part of the planned 90-satellite Yunyao constellation.

Gravity-1 consists of seven solid rocket motors (SRB) in total. The first four side-mounted SRBs are ignited on the ground, while three core boosters are air-lit in sequence. The launch cost for Gravity-1 is around US$39 million. Gravity-1 has a quick-response-time of only five hours between manufacturing completion and launch. Orienspace has signed contracts for the launch of more than one hundred satellites. Gravity-1 is the most powerful rocket consisting of entirely solid-rocket motors. Due to the huge solid rocket motors, large plumes of smoke were produced during the launch.

== List of launches ==
Serial number	Flight number	Date (UTC)	Launch site	Payload	Orbit	Outcome
1	Gravity-1 Y1	11 January 2024; 05:30 UTC	Special converted barge (Dong Fang Hang Tian Gang); Offshore waters of Haiyang Port	Yunyao-1 18–20 weather satellites	LEO (50° inclination, 500 km (310 mi; 270 nmi) circular)	Success
2	Gravity-1 Y2	11 October 2025; 02:20 UTC	Special converted barge (Dong Fang Hang Tian Gang); Offshore waters of Haiyang Port	Jilin-1 Kuanfu-02B-07; Shutianyuxing 01; Shutianyuxing 02	SSO	Success
3	Gravity-1 Y4	22 July 2026; 02:54 UTC	Special converted barge (Dong Fang Hang Tian Gang); Offshore waters of Shanghai	9 Satellites	SSO	Success
4	Gravity-1 Y3	15 September 2026; 22:00 UTC	Special converted barge (Dong Fang Hang Tian Gang); Offshore waters of Haiyang Port	Qianfan Polar Group 26 (8 sats) + EUHT Test satellite	SSO	Success
