= List of rocket launch sites =

This article constitutes a list of rocket launch sites. Some of these sites are known as spaceports or cosmodromes. A single rocket launch is sufficient for inclusion in the table, as long as the site is properly documented through a reference. Missile locations with no launches are not included in the list. Proposed and planned sites and sites under construction are not included in the main tabulation, but may appear in condensed lists under the tables.

A shorter list of spaceports for human spaceflight and satellite launches is available in the article Spaceport.

== Table specification ==
=== Sorting order ===
- Countries in alphabetical order within a table
- Launch sites within a country are sorted chronologically according to start of operations

=== Column specification ===
- Country – territory of the site (the organisation responsible for the launches may reside elsewhere, as indicated in the notes column;
- Location – Name of launch site (sometimes also province etc.)
- Coordinates – geographical coordinates
- Operational date – the period of years of launch activities
- Number of rocket launches – the total number of launches, including failed launches
- Heaviest rocket launched – total mass at lift-off
- Highest achieved altitude – height in km above launch site (unless orbital)
- Notes – comments

Major/active spaceports are shown in bold.

== Africa ==
Country	Location	Coordinates	Operational date	Number of rocket launches	Heaviest rocket launched	Highest achieved altitude	Notes
French Algeria	Centre interarmées d'essais d'engins spéciaux (CIEES), Hammaguir	31.09951°N 2.83581°W	1947–1967	230	18,000 kg	Orbital	Operated by France.
Algeria	Reggane	26.71895°N 0.27691°E	1961–1965	10			
Zaire	Shaba North, Kapani Tonneo OTRAG Launch Center	7.92587°S 28.52766°E	1975–1979	3		<50 km	German OTRAG rockets.
Egypt	Jabal Hamzah ballistic missile test and launch facility	30°07′32.7″N 30°36′18.5″E	1962–1973	6			Testing SRBMs Al Zafir and Al Kahir
Kenya	Broglio Space Centre (San Marco), Malindi	2.94080°S 40.21340°E	1964–1988	27	20,000 kg	Orbital	Scout rockets, operated by ASI and Sapienza University of Rome, Italy.
Libya	Sabha, Tawiwa OTRAG Launch Center	26.99392°N 14.46425°E	1981–1987	2		50 km	German OTRAG rockets after site in Zaire closed.
Mauritania	Nouadhibou	20.92856°N 17.03153°W	1973–1973	1			During a solar eclipse
South Africa	Overberg South African Test Centre	34.60265°S 20.30248°E	1986–1993, 2000s–				Launched test mission rockets only.

== Asia ==
Note that some Russian cosmodromes appear in this section, some in the Europe section.

Country	Location	Coordinates	Operational date	Heaviest rocket launched	Highest achieved altitude	Notes
China	Base 603, Shijiedu, Guangde	30.93743°N 119.20575°E	1960–1966	1,000 kg	<60 km	
China	**Jiuquan Satellite Launch Center**	40.96056°N 100.29833°E	1970–	464,000 kg	Orbital	Human spaceflight
China	**Taiyuan Satellite Launch Center**	38°50′56.71″N 111°36′30.59″E	1980–	249,000 kg	Orbital	Polar satellites
China	**Xichang Satellite Launch Center**	28.24646°N 102.02814°E	1984–	459,000 kg	Interplanetary	Geo-synchronous satellites, lunar probes.
China	**Wenchang Satellite Launch Center**	19°36′52.17″N 110°57′4.08″E	2016–	879,000 kg	Interplanetary	New site on Hainan Island with pads for Long March 5 and Long March 7 rockets
China	Jingyu	42.0°N 126.5°E				
India	**Vikram Sarabhai Space Centre (Thumba Equatorial), Thiruvananthapuram District, Kerala**	8.5314°N 76.8690°E	1962–		Orbital	Primarily used as the launch site for Sounding rockets.
India	**Satish Dhawan Space Centre (Sriharikota Range),** Tirupati District, Andhra Pradesh	13.73740°N 80.23510°E	1971–	690,000 kg	Interplanetary	Polar and Geosynchronous Satellites; Lunar and Mars probes.
India	Abdul Kalam Island, Bhadrak District, Odisha	20.75804°N 87.085533°E	1980–		Sub-Orbital	Military integrated testing range for advanced guided missiles.
Indonesia	LAPAN Rocket Launcher Station, Pameungpeuk, Garut	7.646643°S 107.689018°E	1965–	765 kg	100 km	
Iran	Qom Space Center	34.65000°N 50.90000°E	1991			Military testing
Iran	**Shahroud Space Center**	36.42000°N 55.02000°E	1998–		Orbital	Military tests and missile sounding for ISA Under the control of IRGCASF
Iran	**Semnan spaceport**	35.234631°N 53.920941°E	2009–		Orbital	
Iraq	Al-Anbar Test Center	32.78220°N 44.29962°E	1989	48,000 kg		Out of function Al-Abid
Israel	**Palmachim Air Force Base**	31.88484°N 34.68020°E	1987–	70000 kg	Orbital	
Japan	Akita Rocket Range	39.57148°N 140.05785°E	1956–1990		343 km	
Japan	**Uchinoura Space Center**	31.25186°N 131.07914°E	1962–	139,000 kg	Interplanetary	
Japan	Taiki Multi-Purpose Aerospace Park, Taiki, Hokkaido	42.3000°N 143.2629°E	2010–	1,000 kg	115 km	Suborbital and future orbital launch site for Interstellar Technologies and Space Walker
Japan	**Tanegashima Space Center, Tanegashima Island**	30.39096°N 130.96813°E	1967–	445,000 kg	Interplanetary	
Japan	Spaceport Kii, Kushimoto, Wakayama Prefecture	33.550833°N 135.879722°E	2024–		Orbital	Orbital launch site for Space One
Japan	Ryori	39.03000°N 141.83000°E	1970–2001			Sounding rocket launch site for the Japan Meteorological Agency
Japan	Niijima	34.33766°N 139.26575°E	1963–1965			Eighteen launches of small rockets
Japan	Obachi	40.70342°N 141.36938°E	1961–		105 km	balloon-launched Kappa sounding rockets
Soviet Union/Kazakhstan (Operated by Russia)	**Baikonur Cosmodrome, Tyuratam**	45.95515°N 63.35028°E	1955–	2,400,000 kg	Interplanetary	First satellite, first human in space. Operated by Russia.
Soviet Union/Kazakhstan (Partly operated by Russia)	Sary Shagan	46.38000°N 72.87000°E	1958–			Military testing ground for anti-missile weapons. Part of the testing ground is rented by Russian Ministry of Defense.
North Korea	**Tonghae Satellite Launching Ground**	40.85572°N 129.66587°E	1998–			Military rockets; satellite launch
North Korea	**Sohae Satellite Launching Station**	39.660°N 124.705°E	2012–			Military rockets; satellite launch
South Korea	Anheung Proving Ground	36.70211°N 126.47158°E	1993–			
South Korea	**Naro Space Center, Goheung**	34.42585°N 127.52793°E	2008–	200,000 kg	Orbital	Attempted satellite launches
Maldives	Gan Island	0.69328°S 73.15672°E				Several rockets of the Kookaburra type were launched from a pad at 0°41' S and 73°9' E
Oman	**Etlaq Spaceport**	18.7862°N 56.8220°E	2024-		140 km	Suborbital launches
Pakistan	**Sonmiani Satellite Launch Center, Las Bela, Balochistan**	25.19242°N 66.74881°E	1960s–			Sounding rockets & missile testing for SUPARCO
Soviet Union	Kheysa	80.45000°N 58.05000°E	1956–2008			Arctic sounding rocket launch site
Soviet Union/ Russia	Svobodny Cosmodrome, Amur Oblast	51.83441°N 128.27570°E	1957–2007	47,000 kg	Orbital	ICBM base converted for satellites
Soviet Union	Sovetskaya Gavan	48.97000°N 140.30000°E	1963–1964		402 km	
Soviet Union/ Russia	Okhotsk	59°22′N 143°15′E	1981–2005		1000 km	
Russia	Yasny Cosmodrome (formerly Dombarovsky), Orenburg Oblast	51.20706°N 59.85003°E	2006–	211,000 kg	Orbital	ICBM base converted for satellites
Russia	**Vostochny Cosmodrome, Amur Oblast**	51.883°N 128.333°E	2016–		Lunar	Facility on Russian territory to supplement Baikonur Cosmodrome in Kazakhstan
Taiwan	Gangzi Station, Haiqian, Pingtung County	22.10°N 120.90°E	1988–	10,000 kg	300 km	Science and technology development
Taiwan	Nantian Launch Facility, Taitung County	22.26212°N 120.89037°E,	2016–			Used by TiSPACE for testing and launching

=== Proposed or planned spaceports and rocket launch sites in Asia ===
- Biak Spaceport, Indonesia
- SSLV Launch Complex, Thoothukudi district, Tamil Nadu, India.
- Iran, Chabahar Space Center
- Hokkaido Spaceport (HOSPO), Taiki, Hokkaido, Japan (expansion of the Taiki Multi-Purpose Aerospace Park, used by Interstellar Technologies and Space Waker)

== Europe ==
Note that some European countries operate spaceports in Africa, South America, or other equatorial regions. These spaceports are listed in this article according to their geographical location. Some Russian-controlled launch sites are listed as being in Asia. Note that some Russian cosmodromes appear in this section, some in the section Asia.

Country	Location	Coordinates	Operational date	Number of rocket launches	Heaviest rocket launched	Highest achieved altitude	Notes
Bulgaria	Ahtopol	42.085846°N 27.955125°E	1984–1990	28	475 kg	90 km	
France	Ile du Levant	43.04507°N 6.47887°E	1948–1970s				Missile test site
Germany	Rocket Launch Site Berlin, Berlin-Tegel	52.35000°N 13.21000°E	1930–1933			4 km	
Germany	Peenemünde/Greifswalder Oie	54.14300°N 13.79400°E	1942–1945	3000+	12,500 kg	175 km	V-2 rockets during World War II, first rocket to reach space 20 June 1944
West Germany	Cuxhaven	53.84884°N 8.59154°E)	1945–1964			>110 km	
West Germany	Hespenbusch, Großenkneten	52.939002°N 8.312515°E	1952–1957			<10 km	
Germany	Zingst	54.44008°N 12.78431°E	1970–1992	67	130 kg	80 km	
Greece	Koroni	36.7698°N 21.9316°E	1966–1989	371		114 km	
Italy	Salto di Quirra	39.52731°N 9.63303°E	1964–				
Norway	**Andøya Space Center**	69.29430°N 16.02070°E	1962–	1200+	800 kg	500 km	Rockets to the upper atmosphere. Used by Isar Aerospace for orbital launches of Spectrum.
Norway	Marka	58.20000°N 7.30000°E	1983–1984		16 kg		
Norway	**SvalRak**	78.2234°N 15.6470°E	1997–				
Germany Nazi-occupied Poland	SS-Proving Ground Westpreußen today Poland (Tuchola Forest)	53.61970°N 17.98492°E	1944–1945				Nazi-German V-2 rockets
[[|Germany]]	Leba in Pommern since 1945 part of Poland	54.76904°N 17.59355°E	1941–1945				Nazi-German rockets
Poland	Łeba-Rąbka	54.754486°N 17.517919°E	1963–1973	36			Polish rockets
Germany Nazi-occupied Poland	V-2 missile launch site, Blizna	50.18190°N 21.61620°E	1943–1944	139			Nazi-German V-2 rockets
Soviet Union/Russia	Kapustin Yar Cosmodrome, Astrakhan Oblast	48.57807°N 46.25420°E	1957–			Orbital	Previously for satellite launches
Soviet Union/Russia	Nyonoksa	64.64928°N 39.18721°E	1965–1997				
Soviet Union/Russia	**Plesetsk Cosmodrome**	62°55′32″N 40°34′40″E	1966–	1000+	760,000 kg	Orbital	
Spain	**El Arenosillo**	37.09687°N 6.73863°W	1966–	500+		720 km	Formerly used only by INTA, now used by Zero 2 Infinity and PLD Space
Sweden	Nausta	66.357202°N 19.275813°E	1961–1961	1	30 kg	<80 km	Plutnik rocket.
Sweden	Kronogård	66.4147°N 19.2767°E	1961–1964	18	700 kg	135 km	Arcas, Nike-Cajun and Nike-Apache rockets for atmospheric research.
Sweden	**Esrange, Kiruna**	67.89342°N 21.10429°E	1966–	450	12,400 kg	717 km	Operated by ESRO. Operated by SSC since 1972. Major programmes: Maxus, TEXUS, Maser, stratospheric balloons.
United Kingdom	**South Uist**	57.33000°N 7.33000°W	1959, 2015, 2022	2	1300~ kg		First test launch in 1959. First space launch from the UK took place here in October 2015 as part of 'At Sea Demonstration 15' of an American 'Terrier-Orion' sounding rocket.

=== Proposed or planned spaceports in Europe ===
- Spaceport Sweden, Kiruna
- Newquay, Cornwall, England, UK
- Sutherland spaceport, Scotland, UK Was formally approved by the Scotland Highland Council in August 2020
- Santa Maria, Azores, Portugal
- Andøya Spaceport, Norway
- El Hierro Launch Centre, Canary Islands, Spain
- Taranto-Grottaglie Airport, Italy

== North America ==
Country	Location	Coordinates	Operational date	Number of rocket launches	Heaviest rocket launched	Highest achieved altitude	Notes
Canada	Churchill Rocket Research Range, Manitoba	58.73430°N 93.82030°W	1954–1998	3500+		979 km	Canadian Army
Canada	Resolute Bay, Nunavut	74.6870°N 94.8962°W	1966–1971	17		200 km	National Research Council Canada
Canada	Hall Beach, Nunavut	68.77607°N 81.24346°W	1971–1971	7		270 km	
Canada	Southend, Saskatchewan	56.20°N 103.14°W	1980	2	1,200 kg	156 km	
Canada	Spaceport Nova Scotia, Nova Scotia	45.303559°N 60.982891°W	2023–	3		< 100 km	Under construction by Maritime Launch Services
Greenland (Denmark)	Pituffik Space Base	76.4240°N 68.2936°W	1964–1980				Former US Air Force launch site
United States	Clark University Physics Laboratory, Worcester, Massachusetts	42°15′04″N 71°49′23″W	1914–1920s	≈10			Robert H. Goddard's first experimental rockets, starting with powder-based fuels. Was also site of liquid rocket engine tests before being launched in nearby Auburn.
United States	Goddard Test Site, Auburn, Massachusetts	42.21882°N 71.81194°W	1925–1930	5			Open field chosen as rocket test site in 1925; launch site of Robert H. Goddard's first liquid fuel rockets beginning on 16 March 1926.
United States	Eden Valley Test Site, Roswell, New Mexico	33.62600°N 104.50000°W	1930–1941	>30			Used for Goddard's later rocket tests.
United States	**Wallops Flight Facility, Delmarva Peninsula, Virginia**	37.84621°N 75.47938°W	1945–	1600+			Now operated by NASA's Goddard Space Flight Center.
United States	**White Sands Missile Range, New Mexico**	32.56460°N 106.35908°W	1945–	7500+			Military and civilian flights. Served as alternate landing site for the Space Shuttle.
United States	Nevada Test and Training Range (formerly Nellis Air Force Range)	36.77150°N 116.11374°W	1946–1960s	2000+			
United States	**Poker Flat Research Range, Alaska**	65.12599°N 147.47894°W	1949–	5000+			Sounding rocket launch site
United States	**Cape Canaveral Space Force Station, Florida**	28.46675°N 80.55852°W	1949–	1000+		Interstellar	Commercial and U.S. Government uncrewed missions. Adjacent to NASA KSC.
United States	**Vandenberg Space Force Base, California**	34.77204°N 120.60124°W	1958–	500+		Interplanetary	Satellites, ballistic missile tests. Government and commercial launches. Also launches SpaceX rockets.
United States	**Kennedy Space Center, Florida**	28.6082°N 80.6040°W	1962–	151	3,000,000 kg	Interplanetary	Launched each NASA crewed mission. Adjacent to Cape Canaveral Space Force Station.
United States	**Pacific Missile Range Facility, Hawaii**	22.02278°N 159.785°W	1963–				Used for testing of antiballistic missile and missile tracking by the US Navy.
United States	Keweenaw, Michigan	47.42980°N 87.71443°W	1964–1971	50+	770 kg	<160 km	Sounding rocket launch site. Currently inactive.
United States	**Pacific Spaceport Complex, Kodiak, Alaska**	57.43533°N 152.33931°W	1991–	26	86,000 kg	Orbital	Ballistic missile interceptor tests, satellite launches. Alaska Aerospace Corporation.
United States	**Mid-Atlantic Regional Spaceport (MARS), Delmarva Peninsula, Virginia**	37.833378°N 75.483284°W	1995–	22	89,805 kg	Lunar	Operates in partnership with NASA, adjacent to Wallops Flight Facility. Designed for both commercial and government launches. In 2019, Rocket Lab built their first US launch facility here.
United States	**Mojave Air and Space Port, California**	35.05910°N 118.14880°W	2003–	20+		112 km	Adjacent to Edwards AFB. Privately funded, horizontal-launch spaceport. Xoie, Xombie, Xodiac (Masten Space Systems); SpaceShipOne, SpaceShipTwo (Scaled Composites, Virgin Galactic); Launcher One (Virgin Orbit).
United States	**Spaceport America, Upham, New Mexico**	32.88943°N 106.99945°W	2006–	50+			Sub-orbital commercial and planned space tourist launches. Operated by the state of New Mexico with Virgin Galactic as the anchor tenant. Adjacent to White Sands Missile Range.
United States	**Corn Ranch, Van Horn, Texas**	31.2524°N 104.4532°W	2006–	20		~105 km	Used by Blue Origin for suborbital launches and engine tests.
United States	Spaceport Camden, Camden County, Georgia	30.5539°N 81.3053°W	2016–2019	2		~10 km	Originally Thiokol rocket testing facility. Used by Vector Space for testing and launching. Project and site abandoned in 2023 due to local pushback and financial issues.
United States	**SpaceX Starbase Spaceport, Starbase, Texas**	25.996°N 97.154°W	2018–	~12	~5,000,000 kg	Orbital	Site originally planned for Falcon rockets, now used exclusively by SpaceX for Starship/SuperHeavy testing and launching.
United States	**Maine Spaceport Complex, Washington County, Maine**	44.4444°N 67.6000°W	2020–	1		~2 km	Launch site to be used for suborbital and polar low-Earth orbital launch on the east coast by companies BluShift Aerospace and VALT Enterprises and funded by Maine Space Grant Consortium.

=== Additional rocket launch sites in North America ===
Please delete items or move them to the table above with appropriate data and references.

- Barbados, 13.0770°N 59.4758°W
- Barter Island (United States, 70.10876°N 143.63455°W)
- Black Mesa (United States, 37.37000°N 109.29000°W)
- Cecil Airport, (United States, 30°13′07″N 081°52′36″W)
- Charlestown, Rhode Island (United States, 41.36002°N 71.66840°W)
- Cape Parry (Canada, 70.17000°N 124.71700°W)
- Cold Lake (Canada, 54.40472°N 110.28293°W)
- Datil (United States, 34.08079°N 107.50777°W)
- Eareckson (Aleut islands, United States, 52.72301°N 174.07196°E)
- Edwards Air Force Base (United States, 34°54′20″N 117°53′01″W)
- Eglin Air Force Base (United States, 30.39044°N 86.77345°W)
- Fort Bliss (United States, 32.07371°N 106.15256°W)
- Fort Greely (United States, 63.93414°N 145.73692°W)
- Fort Sherman (United States, 9.36262°N 79.95009°W)
- Fort Wingate (United States, 35.44868°N 108.59940°W)
- Fort Yukon (United States, 66.56230°N 145.19720°W)
- Gillam (Canada, 56.08968°N 96.08925°W)
- Gilson Butte (United States, 38.60783°N 110.59802°W)
- Grand Turk Island 21.472222°N 71.138889°W)
- Green River Launch Complex
- Holloman (United States, 32.90275°N 106.09836°W)
- Mercury (United States, 36.67421°N 115.96832°W)
- NAOTS (United States, 37.95906°N 75.33765°W)
- North Truro Air Force Station (United States, 42.00000°N 70.02000°W)
- Point Arguello (United States, 34.62000°N 120.60000°W)
- Point Barrow(United States, 71.28559°N 156.77593°W)
- Point Mugu (United States, 34.09943°N 119.12125°W)
- Primrose Lake (Canada, 54.75000°N 110.05000°W)
- Ramey (Puerto Rico, United States, 18.49601°N 67.12623°W)
- Red Lake (Canada, 50.88000°N 93.47000°W)
- San Clemente (California, United States, 32.91771°N 118.48698°W)
- San Nicolas Island (California, United States, 33.27981°N 119.52208°W)
- Sheboygan (Wisconsin, United States, |43.751°N 87.714°W)
- Sierra de Juarez (Mexico, 32.25000°N 115.83000°W)
- Sondre Stromfjord (Greenland, 67.02364°N 50.60053°W)
- Tonopah Test Range (United States, 37.79648°N 116.77946°W)
- Yuma (United States, 32.86000°N 114.39700°W)

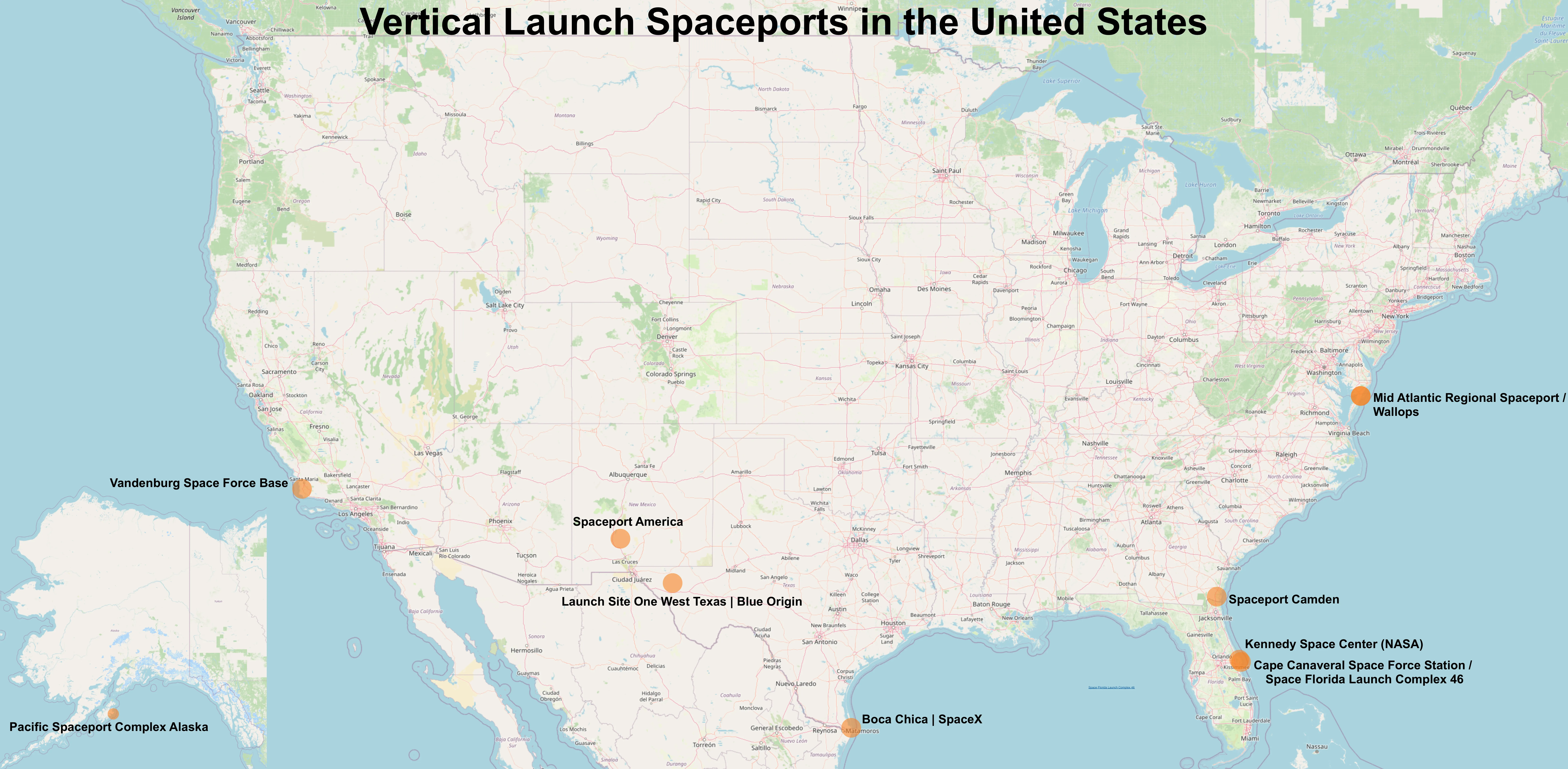
Vertical launch spaceports in the US

=== Proposed or planned spaceports in North America ===
- Atlantic Spaceport Complex, Newfoundland. Under construction by NordSpace
- Cape Breton Spaceport (aka Cape Breton Space Centre), Nova Scotia
- Cape Rich, LFCATC Meaford, Ontario
- Oklahoma Spaceport, Burns Flat,
- Silver Space Ports, Arizona
- Spaceport Washington, Moses Lake, Washington This project was proposed in 2005 by a small real estate brokerage firm operating from an office in Renton, Washington, and has since proven to have been a scam. The principal party - Mr. Andy Shin Fong Chen, CEO of ASPI Group, LLC - was charged with fraud by the U.S. Securities and Exchange Commission on 15 March 2017. No licensing was ever issued by any local, state or Federal government agency, nor was any construction ever initiated.
- Starbase Louisiana, Pecan Island, Louisiana – planned SpaceX spaceport for Starship launches, with construction expected to begin in 2027.
- Roosevelt Roads Naval Station - at a former Naval station in Puerto Rico, the local redevelopment authority, in December 2024, issued a request for proposal for a vertical space launch site on 66.17 acres, at Roosevelt Roads Naval Station site.

== South America ==
Country	Location	Coordinates	Operational date	Number of rocket launches	Heaviest rocket launched	Highest achieved altitude	Notes
Argentina	Pampa de Achala	31.5833°S 64.8333°W	1961–1962	8	28 kg	25 km	First Argentine launch site
Argentina	CELPA	30.12737°S 66.34082°W	1962–1991, 2010–	100 (approximately)	933 kg	550 km	Military Launch Test Site (CITIDEF)
Argentina	Las Palmas	27.09531°S 58.75352°W	1966–1966	2	3,400 kg	270 km	During a solar eclipse, with Titus rockets.
Argentina	Tartagal	22.76158°S 63.82381°W	1966–1966				During a solar eclipse
Argentina	Mar Chiquita	37.72427°S 57.40512°W	1968–1972	11			
Argentina	Villa Reynolds	33.72460°S 65.37730°W	1973–1973	2			
Argentina	Serrezuela	30.6333°S 65.3833°W	2009	1	500 kg	40 km	Military test (Gradicom I)
Argentina	**Punta Indio**	35.523889°S 57.183889°W	2011–	3	7,076 kg	2.2 km	Civilian Launch Test Site (CONAE)
Argentina	**Puerto Belgrano**	38.9628°S 61.715°W	2014–				Launch pad for Tronador II under construction (CONAE)
Brazil	**Natal-Barreira do Inferno**	5.86600°S 35.38300°W	1965–	233	7,270 kg	1100 km	
Brazil	Praia do Cassino	32.08338°S 52.16725°W	1966–1966	27			
Brazil	**Alcântara Launch Center, Maranhão**	2.3160°S 44.3676°W	1990–	47	6,737 kg	956 km	Brazilian Air Force, Brazilian Space Agency. Planned satellite launches.
French Guiana	**Guiana Space Centre, Kourou**	5.23739°N 52.76950°W	1968–	<200	777,000 kg	Interplanetary	Operated by CNES for ESA; launch base for Arianespace. Commercial and governmental launches.
Peru	Chilca Launch Range	12.50477°S 76.79849°W	1974-1983	<65		590 km	Sounding rocket launch location.
Peru	Chilca PLOB, Punta Lobos Range	12.50000°S 76.8000°W	1983	32	2,000 kg	590 km	Sounding rocket launch location. Possibly part of, or identical to, Chilca Launch Range.
Dutch Suriname	Coronie	5.86447°N 56.32553°W	1965–1965	4		205 km	

== Oceania ==
Country	Location	Coordinates	Operational date	Number of rocket launches	Heaviest rocket launched	Highest achieved altitude	Notes
Australia	**Woomera Test Range, SA**	30.95875°S 136.50366°E	1950s–		28,000 kg	Orbital	Australian government research facility. Missile testing, 2 satellite launches.
Australia	Carnarvon, WA	24.48564°S 113.40866°E	1964–1965	12		120 km	
Australia	Lancelin, WA	30.98309°S 115.31774°E	1974–1974	2			During a total solar eclipse
Australia	**Koonibba Test Range, SA**	31.885558°S 133.448686°E	2019–	4		85 km	Used by Southern Launch for suborbital launch tests
Australia	**Whalers Way Orbital Launch Complex, SA**	34.934°S 135.6523°E	2020–				Used by Southern Launch for orbital polar launches
Australia	Arnhem Space Centre, NT	12.378021°S 136.821402°E	2021–2024	2		327 km	First NASA launches outside USA. Australia's first commercial launches
Marshall Islands	**Reagan Test Site, Omelek Island, Kwajalein Atoll**	9.048167°N 167.743083°E	1950s–		39,000 kg	Orbital	US-controlled ICBM base converted for satellites. SpaceX Falcon 1. Close to the equator.
New Zealand	Birdling's Flat	43.81700°S 172.68300°E	1980s–	10<			Used for sounding rockets. Formerly proposed launch site for Rocket Lab, never developed.
New Zealand	Great Mercury Island	36.35511°S 175.46006°E	2009	1	60 kg	120 km	Used for the first launch by Rocket Lab of their Atea 1 suborbital rocket.
New Zealand	**Rocket Lab Launch Complex 1, Mahia Peninsula**	39.26044°S 177.86431°E	2017–	86	13,000 kg	Lunar	Launch site built and operated by Rocket Lab. First commercial spaceport in the southern hemisphere.

=== Past and/or planned only ===
- Cape York Peninsula, Queensland.
  - Space Centre Australia secured land for main site facilities for space launch, located 43km east of Weipa, close to RAAF Scherger in 2023. Final approvals may come under Mokwiri Aboriginal Corporation. Previously a Cape York Space Agency was established by the government to develop a facility for Ukrainian Zenit launches at Weipa. However, traditional owners from Cape York Land Council blocked the proposal.
  - Space Centre Australia, secondary site, at Utingu, known as Punsand Bay in Bamaga, which comes under the council of the Torres Strait Island Region, and is said to be one of the closest facilities to equatorial launch access in the Asia Pacific region.
- Christmas Island, Australian external territory.
  - Site planned 1997 by the Asia Pacific Space Centre, but did not go ahead due to insufficient backing.
  - Japan Aerospace Exploration Agency (JAXA) conducted Phase I of a High Speed Flight Demonstration (HSFD) at Aeon Field on Christmas Island in 2002.

== Launches at sea ==
Country	Location	Coordinates	Operational date	Number of rocket launches	Heaviest rocket launched	Highest achieved altitude	Notes
	**Ocean Odyssey complex**	Mobile	1999–	30	462,000 kg	Orbital	Mobile satellite launch platform operated by Sea Launch. Uses a converted oil platform that plies between Long Beach, California, where a Zenit-3SL rocket is collected, and the equator, where the rocket is launched.
Russia	Russian Delta class submarines	Mobile	1998–	2	30,000 kg	Orbital	Launch of uncrewed satellites into Earth orbit via converted SLBM missile Shtil from the Barents Sea.
Denmark	**MLP Sputnik**	55°02′57″N 15°36′11″E	2010–	4	1,630 kg	8.2 km	Mobile satellite launch platform operated by Copenhagen Suborbitals.

=== Additional rocket launch sites in the oceans and Antarctica ===
Please delete items or move them to the table above with appropriate data and references.

- Ascension Island (Atlantic island, 7.97476°S 14.41470°W)
- Barking Sands (Pacific island, 22.04872°N 159.77650°W)
- Base Matienzo (Antarctica, 64.80000°S 60.10000°W)
- Bigen Island (Marshall Islands 8.36458°N 171.04284°E)
- Bikini Atoll (Atoll in the Pacific, launches in conjunction with nuclear bomb tests, 11.61498°N 165.55293°E)
- Dumont d'Urville (Antarctica, 64.67000°S 140.02000°E)
- Eniwetok (Atoll in the Pacific, launches in conjunction with nuclear bomb tests, 11.33991°N 162.32493°E)
- Guam, 13.59692°N 144.90248°E)
- Johnston Atoll (Pacific island, 16.73294°N 169.52980°W)
- Kerguelen (South Pacific island, 49.35220°S 70.21914°E)
- Kindley Air Force Base (Bermuda islands, 32.36179°N 64.68583°W)
- McMurdo Station (Antarctica, 77.85000°S 166.66000°E)
- Molodyozhnaya (Antarctica), 67.66000°S 45.85000°E)
- Rarotonga (Cook Islands, 21.20237°S 159.80614°W)
- Rothera (Antarctica, 67.56700°S 68.11700°W)
- Siple (Antarctica, 75.94000°S 84.24810°W)
- Syowa Base (Antarctica, 69.00000°S 39.58000°E)
- Vicecomodoro Marambio Station (Antarctica, 64.27000°S 56.72000°W)
- Wake Island (Pacific island, 19.28997°N 166.61768°E)

== See also ==
- Launch pad
- Spaceport, including lists of spaceports that have achieved satellite launches and launches of humans
- List of launch complexes
