= Kookaburra (disambiguation) =

Kookaburras are birds native to Australia and New Guinea, of the genus Dacelo.

Kookaburra may also refer to:

- Kookaburra (album), 2024 album by Australian band the Whitlams
- Kookaburra (aircraft), an airplane involved in the death of Keith Anderson and Bobby Hitchcock
- Kookaburras (hockey), an Australian national men's hockey team
- "Kookaburra" (song), a popular children's song
- Kookaburra (rocket), an Australian sounding rocket
- Australian Silver Kookaburra, a silver bullion coin
- Kookaburra Sport, a sports equipment company
- "Kookaburra", a song by Cocteau Twins from the 1985 album Aikea-Guinea
- HMAS Kookaburra (A331), Royal Australian Navy
- Dulmont Magnum, an Australian early laptop computer known as the Kookaburra
- Schneider ES-52 Kookaburra, an Australian-designed and -built glider from the 1950s

== See also ==
- Kookaburra I and Kookaburra II, racing yachts
- Kookaburra III, a racing yacht that sailed in the America's Cup
- Kookooburra, a former Sydney Harbour ferry
