= Motto =

Short sentence expressing a motivation

Logo of the French Republic "Liberté, Egalité, Fraternité", French for "liberty, equality, fraternity"

A motto (derived from the Latin muttum, 'mutter', by way of Italian motto, 'word' or 'sentence') is a sentence or phrase expressing a belief or purpose, or the general motivation or intention of an individual, family, social group, or organization. Mottos (or mottoes) are usually found predominantly in written form (unlike slogans, which may also be expressed orally), and may stem from long traditions of social foundations, or from significant events, such as a civil war or a revolution. One's motto may be in any language, but Latin has been widely used, especially in the Western world.

== Language ==
Latin has been very common for mottos in the Western World, but for nation states, their official national language is generally chosen. Examples of using other historical languages in motto language include:

- County of Somerset in England: Sumorsǣte ealle (All the men of Somerset), Old English.
- South Cambridgeshire in the English Fens: Niet Zonder Arbyt (Nothing without work), Dutch, originally the motto of Dutchman Cornelius Vermuyden, who drained The Fens in the 17th century.
- South Africa: ǃke e: ǀxarra ǁke (Unity in diversity), ǀXam.
- Shire of Shetland: Með lögum skal land byggja (By law shall the land be built up), Old Norse.

A canting motto is one that contains word play. For example, the motto of the Earl of Onslow is Festina lente (literally 'make haste slowly'), punningly interpreting 'on slow'. Similarly, the motto of the Burgh of Tayport, Te oportet alte ferri (It is incumbent on you to carry yourself high), is a cant on 'Tayport at auld Tay Ferry', also alluding to the local lighthouse. The motto of the U.S. Federal Bureau of Investigation, Fidelity, Bravery, Integrity, is a backronym of the letters F.B.I.

== List of examples ==
Map of the states that have a national motto

- United in diversity, the motto of the European Union (EU)
- In God We Trust, the motto of the United States (US)
- Je Maintiendrai Châlons (French for "I will maintain Châlons"), often abbreviated as Je maintiendrai (French for "I will maintain"), the motto of the Netherlands
- Dieu et mon droit (French for "God and my right"), is the motto of the monarch of the United Kingdom. It appears on a scroll beneath the shield of the version of the coat of arms of the United Kingdom.
- Ελευθερία ή θάνατος (Eleftheria i thanatos), the national motto of Greece (Greek for "Freedom or Death")
- Plus ultra, official motto of Spain (Latin for "Further beyond")
- Post tenebras lux (Latin for "Light After Darkness"), motto of University of Geneva
- E Mare Libertas, official motto of the micronation of Sealand (Latin for "From the Sea, Freedom")

== Mottos in heraldry ==
In heraldry, a motto is often found below the shield in a banderole in the compartment. This placement stems from the Middle Ages, in which the vast majority of nobles possessed a coat of arms complete with a motto. In the case of Scottish heraldry, it is mandated to appear above the crest and is called slogan (see: Slogan (heraldry)). The word 'slogan' is an Anglicisation of the Scottish Gaelic sluagh-ghairm (sluagh "army, host" + gairm "cry"). There are several notable slogans which are thought to originate from a battle or war cries. In heraldic literature, the terms 'rallying cry' respectively 'battle banner' are also common. Spanish coats of arms may display a motto in the bordure of the shield.

In English heraldry, mottos are not granted with armorial bearings, and may be adopted and changed at will. In Scottish heraldry, mottos can only be changed by re-matriculation, with the Lord Lyon King of Arms. Although unusual in England, and perhaps outside English heraldic practice, there are some examples, such as in Belgium, of the particular appearance of the motto scroll and letters thereon being blazoned; a prominent example is the obverse of the Great Seal of the United States (which is a coat of arms and follows heraldic conventions), the blazon for which specifies that the motto scroll is held in the beak of the bald eagle serving as the escutcheon's supporter.

Motto "Domine dirige nos" (Latin for 'Lord, guide us') below the Coat of arms of the City of London

Motto Deus protector noster (Latin for 'God is our protector') below the arms of Pori

Above the crest is the slogan (see: Slogan (heraldry), most traditional in Scottish heraldry) or the war cry, Arms of Brady Brim-DeForest, Baron of Balvaird

Motto To Fly, To Serve below the coat of arms of British Airways

Ships and submarines in the Royal Navy (RN) each have a badge and motto, as do units of the Royal Air Force (RAF).

== Mottos in literature ==
In literature, a motto is a sentence, phrase, poem, or word; prefixed to an essay, chapter, novel, or the like, suggestive of its subject matter. It is a short, suggestive expression of a guiding principle for the written material that follows.

For example, Robert Louis Stevenson's Travels with a Donkey in the Cévennes uses mottos at the start of each section.

== See also ==
- Epigram
- Epitaph
- Hendiatris
- List of Latin phrases
- List of mottos
- List of national mottos
- Mission statement
- Slogan
- Tagline
