= Rockair =

Rockair (or "Rockaire")
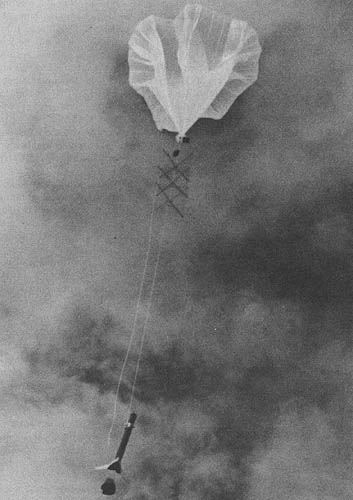
- A Deacon rocket, in this case being used as a Rockoon. The Rockoon concept later succeeded the Rockair, however, note that no balloon was involved in Rockair launches.
- Mission type: Research
- Operator: United States Navy and Air Force
- Mission duration: 491 days

Spacecraft properties
- Manufacturer: North American Aviation and Allegany Ballistics Laboratory

The Rockair was first suggested by Hermann Oberth in his 1929 book Wege zur Raumschiffahrt. Rockair concepts were developed by both the United States Air Force and Navy, both generally finding marginal use in the concept. The Air Force began studying the concept of an air-launched sounding rocket in 1947, while the Navy managed to get the first launch on August 16, 1955, using an F2H2 off of Wallops Island. The folded-fin aerial rocket(FFAR) reached an altitude of 54,864 m (180,000 ft). The Air Force followed up with their first air-launched sounding rocket concept on December 13, 1956, under the name "Rockaire". A Deacon rocket was used, launched from a F-86 fighter aircraft.

The Navy Rockair had a total of 5 launches, while the Air Force Rockaire had a total of 4 for a combined 9 launches.

According to a NASA historical summary, no important scientific research was every carried out with the Rockair concept. It had very little popularity, in contrast to the "Rockoon" which was launched in the hundreds during the 1950s.

== Launch History of the Rockair ==
Date	Launch site	Rocket	Launch Platform	Apogee
August 16, 1955	NAOTS	FFAR	F2H2	50 km(31 mi)
August 16, 1955	NAOTS	FFAR	F2H2	55 km(34 mi)
August 16, 1955	NAOTS	FFAR	F2H2	9 km(5.5 mi)
November 1, 1955	NAOTS	FFAR	F2H2	50 km(31 mi)
November 1, 1955	NAOTS	FFAR	F2H2	50 km(31 mi)

== Launch History of the Rockaire ==
Date	Launch site	Rocket	Launch Platform	Apogee
December 13, 1956	Holloman	Deacon	F-86D	44 km(27 mi)
December 14, 1956	Holloman	Deacon	F-86D	42 km(26 mi)
December 17, 1956	Holloman	Deacon	F-86D	43 km(26 mi)
December 19, 1956	Holloman	Deacon	F-86D	45 km(27 mi)
