= Maine Spaceport Complex =

Proposed state-wide private launch sites

Coastal Launch Pad
- Interactive map of Coastal Launch Pad
- Location: Washington County, Maine, United States
- Coordinates: 44.4444°N 67.6000°W
- Operator: Maine Spaceport Corp; BluShift Aerospace; VALT Enterprises
- Launch pad: 1
Coastal Launch Pad launch history
- Launches: 0
- First launch: Q2 2024
- Associated rockets: Stardust Rogue Beta

Loring Commerce Centre Launch Site
- Location: Loring Commerce Centre Aroostook County, Maine, United States
- Operator: Maine Spaceport Corp; BluShift Aerospace
- Launch pad: 1
Loring Commerce Centre launch history
- Launches: 1
- First launch: January 31, 2021
- Associated rockets: Stardust 1.0

The Maine Spaceport Complex is the name for a series of proposed spaceports across the state of Maine being built for private companies like BluShift Aerospace. Its construction is being overseen by the Maine Space Corporation, a quasi-governmental agency.

== History ==
The project was started in 2020, and consists of planned locations in Brunswick, Portland, Orono, Aroostook County, and Washington County. BluShift conducted the first successful launch of their Stardust series of rockets at Loring Commerce Centre (formerly Loring Air Force Base) on January 31, 2021. Afterwards, other planned launches from the site were canceled, and the next launch was planned to take place in the second quarter of 2024 either from Coastal Launch Pad nearby the towns of Jonesport and Beals in Washington County (although the Vertical Launch Pad at Spaceport America in New Mexico has also been considered).
