= PD AeroSpace =

Japanese space tourism company

PD Aerospace

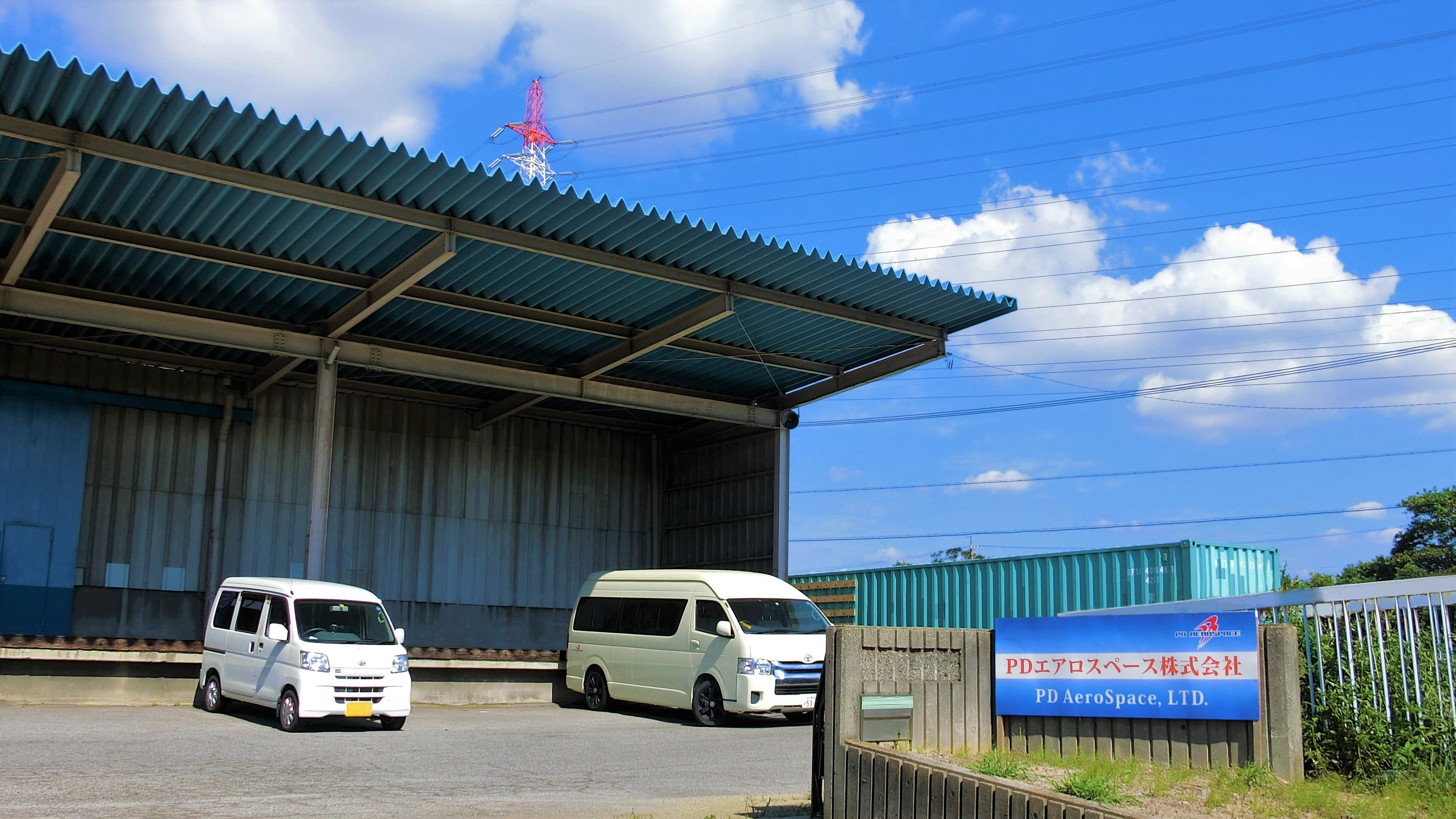
- New R&D center of PD Aerospace in Nagoya.
- Native name: PDエアロスペース株式会社
- Romanized name: Pī Dī Earosupēsu Kabushiki-gaisha
- Type: KK
- Industry: Space tourism
- Founded: 30 May 2007; 19 years ago in Nagoya, Aichi Prefecture, Japan
- Founder: Shuji Ogawa
- Headquarters: Nagoya, Japan
- Key people: Shuji Ogawa (President)
- Number of employees: 5
- Website: www.pdas.co.jp

PD Aerospace (Japanese: ＰＤエアロスペース株式会社, Hepburn: Pī Dī Earosupēsu Kabushiki-gaisha), often abbreviated PDAS, is a Japanese space tourism company based in Nagoya founded in 2007 by Shuji Ogawa. The "PD" in the company's name stands for "pulse detonation". PDAS is developing a suborbital spaceplane to carry two pilots and six passengers using a hybrid of jet and rocket power. Initial tickets are planned for ¥ 14,000,000 (about $125,000 USD as of April 2017) eventually lowering to ¥400,000 (about $3,600).

PDAS plans to develop a hybrid engine that produces jet and rocket thrust, using pulse detonation jet and pulse combustion rocket modes. To reduce the cost of development and keep the vehicle low-cost, PDAS plans to use commercially available hardware, instead of custom-designed parts. H.I.S. and ANA own 10% and 7% of the company, respectively.

The company signed a memorandum of understanding with Okinawa Prefecture in 2020 to develop a commercial spaceport at Shimojishima Airport. At the time, PD Aerospace was targeting wealthy Chinese customers. In February 2023, PD AeroSpace signed a memorandum of understanding with 0-G Launch, a Washington-based zero-gravity flight operator, to offer zero-gravity flights from Shimojishima.

The company's PDAS-X06 unmanned testbed aircraft crashed off of Shimojishima in 2023. Later that year, the company's CEO told Reuters that he expected to conduct an initial public offering after their successful unmanned test flight, expected around 2027.

In 2024, PD AeroSpace exhibited a new rocket engine design to the media and stated that it was planning to offer commercial space flights by 2031, and to reduce the cost per flight to 1 million yen or less by 2040.

== See also ==
- Blue Origin
- Interstellar Technologies, a Japanese rocket startup
- Virgin Galactic
