= Blairlogie Castle =

Country house in Blairlogie, Perth and Kinross, Scotland

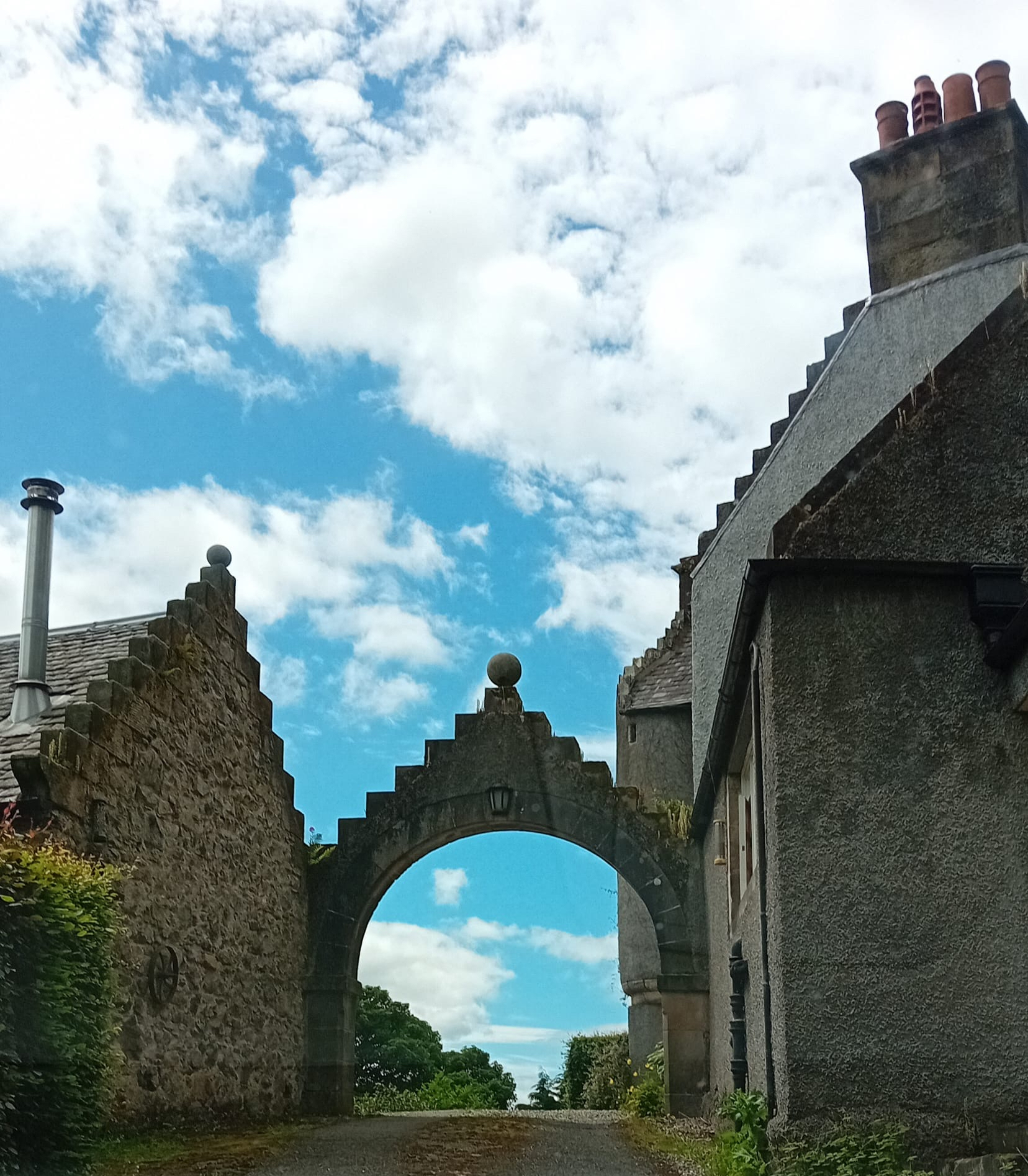
- The entrance to Blairlogie Castle

- Location in Stirling
- 56.150917°N 3.888918°W

Site notes
- Owner: Brady Brim-DeForest

Listed Building – Category A
- Designated: 5 September 1973
- Reference no.: LB10461

Blairlogie Castle (in Scottish Gaelic: Caisteil Blàr Lagaidh), also known as "The Blair", stands in its grounds near the village of Blairlogie in Stirling in Scotland, one of Scotland's earliest conservation villages, consisting of a cluster of 17th-19th-century cottages. The castle commands a strategic position at the southern end of the Ochil Hills on the Northeastern approach into the ancient Scottish capital of Stirling. It sits at the base of the cliff of Dumyat, and at the foot of Castlelaw, overlooking the National Wallace Monument.

The castle is a category A listed building and was listed in 1973.

== History ==
The lands of the Blairlogie estate were held by the Scottish Crown until 1513, when James IV granted them to a James Spittal, a Stirling based merchant who was said to have served as tailor to Queen Margaret. James Spittal died in 1528, and his younger son, a second James, inherited the lands of Blairlogie. His son, Alexander Spitall, had the tower built in 1543, and it was Alexander’s son Adam Spittal who extended it with a stair wing in 1582 making it into a L-plan tower. Blairlogie was a possession of the Spittal family from the late 15th century until 1767, when the last to bear the name, Elizabeth Spitall, married Robert Dundas of Blair, near Culross. The estate hence passed into the hands of the Dundases of Blair. In 1845 a later Robert Dundas sold the estate, after which passed through different hands. The castle and surrounding estate was purchased by Lt Col James Hare of Calder Hall in 1891 who carried out extensive alterations.

== The castle and gardens ==
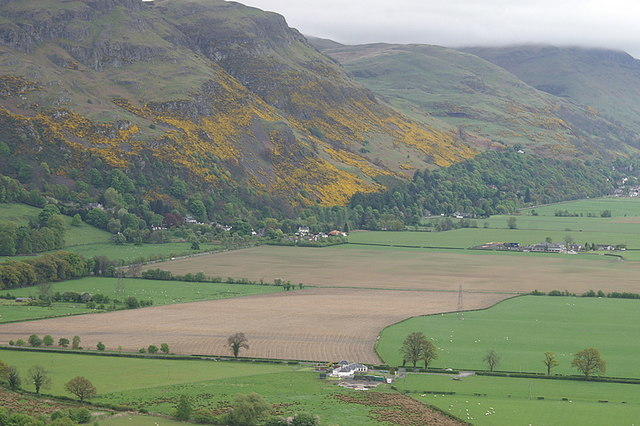
Blairlogie situated within the Ochill Hills

The castle is perched above the village of Blairlogie with a small burn running to the east. The Castle is at its core a 16th-century tower house and consists of four parts: the old tower, composed of three storeys and at least two corner turrets; a rectangular block to the rear; two extensions on the eastern side.

Three dormer windows bear carvings of a fleur de lis and initials A. S. (most likely for Alexander Spittal), a thistle and initials E. H. (for Ellen Holbourne or Hay, Alexander's wife), and a man's head, or rose, and date 1513 (year of Flodden) or 1543.

The walls are 0.71 m (2 ft 4 in) thick, rubble-built and harled. The gables are crow-stepped and the roof is composed of slate. The tower retains four early windows, and in addition a Victorian oriel window has been inserted in the South gable along with a projecting stair. The basement of the original tower has two vaulted cellars, while the hall occupied the first floor. The gardens to the West of the castle are hedged and stepped, with stables to the west, and a summer house to the north.
