= Marka (launch site) =

Former rocket launch site in Norway

Coordinates: 58°12′N 7°18′E

Marka is a former rocket launch site situated in Lindesnes Municipality, Norway. It was used for twelve launches of sounding rockets of the type Super Loki between November 1983 and January 1984.
