= Scottish heraldry =

- Royal Coat of Arms of Scotland (prior to 1603)
- Heraldic tradition: Gallo-British
- Governing body: Court of the Lord Lyon
- Chief officer: Joseph Morrow, Lord Lyon King of Arms

Heraldry in Scotland, while broadly similar to that practised in England and elsewhere in western Europe, has its own distinctive features. Its heraldic executive is separate from that of the rest of the United Kingdom.

== Executive ==
The bearings that may be used by the Lord Lyon King of Arms, the coat being impalable with the office holder's personal coat.

The Scottish heraldic executive is separate from that of the remainder of the United Kingdom and is vested in the Lord Lyon King of Arms. The earliest reference to the Lyon, as such, dates to the reign of Robert the Bruce in 1318, although with respect to certain of his functions he is considered the successor of royal officials dating to ancient Celtic times. The Lord Lyon exercises general jurisdiction over all matters armorial in Scotland and serves as a Judge of the Realm. He also decides on questions relating to family representation, pedigrees and genealogies. In addition, he supervises all state, royal and public ceremonies in Scotland. The Lord Lyon also asserts the right to decide who is Head of the Clan or Chief of the Family or Name, although his authority to determine chiefships has been challenged. (Note: "The jurisdiction of the Court of the Lord Lyon in questions of precedence or clan chiefships was rejected by the Court of Session, but Lord Lyon does not regard those decisions as being final, and continues to exercise this jurisdiction in defiance of the Court of Sessions [sic]." See Scottish clan chief.)

In carrying out his duties, he has been assisted, in recent times, by a staff of three heralds and pursuivants along with a Lyon Clerk and Keeper of the Records.

Pursuant to Chapter 47 of the Act of 1672, the Lord Lyon is empowered to grant arms to "vertuous [virtuous] and well deserving persons." According to Innes of Learney: "A [Scottish] coat of arms is the outward indication of nobility and arms are officially described as 'Ensigns of Nobility'. A patent of arms is . . . a Diploma of Nobility . . . ." Clarifying this statement, a later writer on Scottish heraldry has noted: "Technically, a grant of arms from the Lord Lyon is a patent of nobility; the grantee is thereby 'enrolled with all nobles in the noblesse of Scotland'. This does not constitute a peerage or any title. It is a social distinction, and has no legal privileges."

== Principles ==
The principal function of heraldry, whether personal or corporate, is to symbolise the identity of the owner of the armorial bearings. In Scotland the Clan, the Family, and the Name have survived as significant entities in the social organization of Scottish society.

In Scottish heraldry there is no such thing as a "family coat of arms". Junior members of a family are assigned specific and relevant differences to the armorial bearings of an ancestor.

Scottish heraldry operates under the supposition that all those who share the same surname are related, however distantly. Consequently, where a coat of arms for the head of a family already exists, new grants of arms to individuals with the same surname will generally be variations on those arms. "[T]he salient feature of Scottish heraldry is that, as compared with England and other countries, the basic coats of arms are relatively few in number, but numerous differenced versions of each basic shield exist. The basic, or simple undifferenced arms and crest, are the property, not of the 'family', but of the 'Chief' of each clan or house …."

The strict adherence to cadency, or the need for cadets to difference their arms from the chief of the family, is due to the permanence of the old families. From an early period the leading families of England were extinguished in the male line. Some continue to exist in the male line, but are comparatively obscure, having sprung from untitled cadets of the ancient families. On the other hand, the Scottish families were remarkable for their numerous progeny. Subinfeudation, which had been prohibited in England since the time of the Plantagenet kings, was largely practised in Scotland. Whole districts of Scotland have their predominant names, which are generally those of the old families. Surnames were for a long time after their introduction, used only by the gentry; and when they began to be assumed by the lower orders, the clansman almost invariably took the name of his chief, considering himself a member of his family, at least by adoption, if not by blood. In England new men emerged, and founded new families; it was easier to adopt new arms rather than trace a connection with those who had died. Hence it came to pass that while in England the multitude of entirely distinct coats of arms is enormous, in Scotland the number of original coats is small.

The earliest existing examples of Scots heraldry are Stewart coats of arms from seals of the last half of the 12th century and the first half of the 13th, and show the fess chequy, which is still a feature of 21st century Scots heraldry. (Note: See the arms of Stuart of Yeochrie and those of Stewarton Community Council.)

The Lord Lyon King of Arms has a vital and continuing influence on the family organization in Scotland. Depending on the terms of the original grant, armorial bearings are succeeded to by the heir—who may be the heir male, the heir female, or the heir by tailzie (an heir nominated within the blood relationship).

== Characteristics ==
=== Mottoes ===
One of the most obvious visual distinctions of Scottish heraldry from heraldic styles used elsewhere is that the scroll on which the motto is displayed is almost always positioned above the crest in Scottish bearings, as depicted in the illustration of the Royal Coat of Arms of Scotland above. (Note: In Scottish heraldry mottoes are placed below the shield only when there are two or more mottoes, in which case one is placed above the crest, the other below the shield, or where there is no crest, as is common with corporate arms.) This difference is more than merely visual, however. In Scottish heraldry mottoes are considered a component of the grant of arms and can be altered only by re-matriculating the arms. In English heraldry, while a motto is usually illustrated in the patent of arms, with very rare exceptions, it is not included in the verbal grant of armorial bearings. Consequently, English mottoes may be changed at will.

The Stodart system of differencing the coats of arms of cadet branches of a family

=== Cadency ===
Another difference between Scottish and English heraldry that may be discerned from the appearance of the shield itself lies in the systems employed to distinguish younger sons of an armiger, known as cadency. English heraldry uses a series of small symbols, termed brisures, to differentiate between the senior representative of an armigerous family and junior lines known as "cadet branches". In Scotland, except for the line of the immediate heir, this function is served by a series of bordures (borders) surrounding the shield of varying, specified colors and designs, named the "Stodart" system. In Scottish practice brisures function only as "temporary house marks of cadency used by children . . . without formal authority of the Lyon Office, until they establish houses of their own."

=== Badges ===
Heraldic badges are treated differently in Scottish heraldic practice than in English armoury. A badge may be defined as "An armorial device, not part of the coat of arms, but . . . available to an armigerous person or corporation for the purpose of identification." Badges may consist of no more than a charge from the shield of arms, but others were emblems adopted for their hidden meaning or in allusion to a name, title or office. In England, the granting of badges to armigers by the College of Arms has become "commonplace" in recent years.

A crest badge suitable for a member of Clan Maclachlan.

In Scottish heraldry, however, the grant of badges is limited to those categories of individuals who may be expected to have a "numerous following", that is to say a significant body of adherents or supporters. Generally badges are awarded only to peers, the baronage, clan chiefs and chieftains and the older landed houses and only when the Lord Lyon is satisfied that the grant of a badge is warranted on practical grounds. Corporate bodies, such as local governments, schools, companies or sports clubs may also obtain badges as a means for their members to display their affiliation.

Scottish heraldry, however, also recognizes a unique form of badge, the crest badge. In the case of an armiger, this device is composed of his crest, encircled by a plain circle on which is inscribed the individual's motto. As a mark of allegiance to their chief, members of a clan are permitted to wear a clansmen's badge, consisting of their chief's crest surrounded by a strap and buckle device on which the chief's motto is inscribed.

=== Crests ===
In English heraldic practice the crest, the device or emblem that appears above the helmet or chapeau in a full coat of arms, should not duplicate any crest previously granted. Just as each shield should be unique, so too should each crest. In Scotland, however, it is permissible, and not uncommon, for two or more different families to bear the same crest. As Scottish heraldry joins the crest and motto in the crest badge, however, the combination of crest and motto should, in each case, be unique.

=== Heiresses ===
In traditional heraldic practice coats of arms pass through the male line. Where a woman's father bears arms and, at his death, there are no surviving sons or surviving children of sons, the woman is an heraldic heiress and can transmit her father's arms to her descendants. In England, if there is more than one surviving daughter, each transmits her father's arms on equal terms. In Scotland, only the eldest surviving daughter transmits her father's undifferenced arms to her offspring.

=== Quarterings ===
In heraldry a basic shield can be divided into four, essentially equal, sections or quarterings. In recent times this typically occurs as the result of the marriage of an armiger to an heraldic heiress. English heraldry appears to put no limit on such divisions, which continue to be termed "quarterings" no matter how many more are added.^{,} (Note: The "record holder" appears to be an early nineteenth-century painting of the arms of Temple-Nugent-Brydges-Chandos-Grenville, the only British family to have used a five-part surname. The 719 quarterings depicted include ten variations of the English royal arms, the arms of the Spencer family of the late Princess of Wales and those of many other of the most prominent families of English history.) Scottish practice favours a simplicity of design and permits each quarter to itself be quartered, but no more. A Scottish shield, therefore, is limited to sixteen quarterings.

== Important works ==
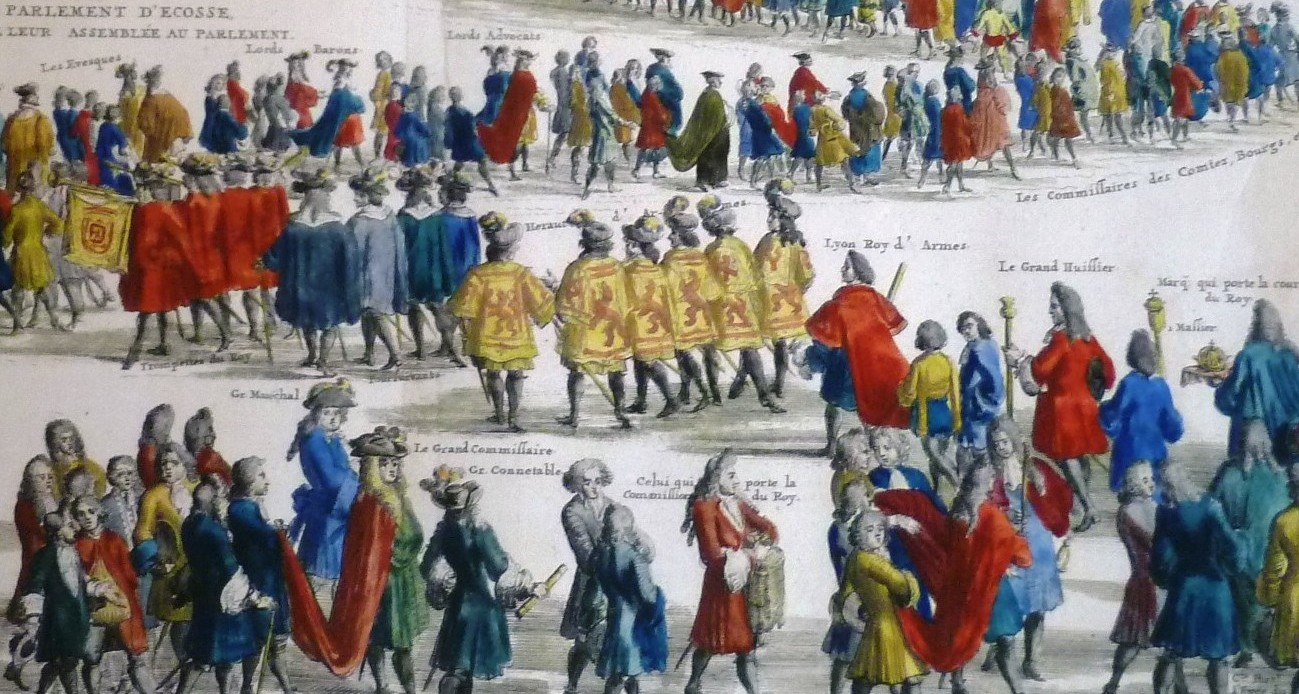
Scottish heralds and the Lord Lyon, from an 18thC French illustration of an opening of the Scottish parliament

"Scotland has no ancient rolls of arms as in England and its earliest document of any importance is the Armorial de Gelré 1369–1388 preserved in Brussels - a European manuscript with a section on Scottish arms." The first truly Scottish armorial dates only from 1508. (Note: The blazons of armorial rolls containing Scottish arms can currently be found under the heading The Mitchell Rolls on the website of the Heraldry Society of Scotland.)

Two of the oldest and most important works on the subject of Scottish heraldry are The Science of Herauldry by George Mackenzie of Rosehaugh, first published in 1680, and A System of Heraldry by Alexander Nisbet, first published in 1722. Mackenzie is regard as legal authority in matters of Scottish heraldry. Whether Nisbet is likewise regarded as of "institutional authority" is unclear, (Note: Writing as Lord Lyon in the preface to the 1984 reprinted edition of Nisbet's System of Heraldry, Innes of Edingight stated that "the work of Alexander Nisbet has not been received as of institutional authority." In 1991, however, Sir Crispin Agnew of Lochnaw, Rothesay Herald, characterized both Nisbet and MacKenzie of Rosehaugh as "institutional writers." Agnew has further specified that the second volume of Nisbet's work is considered "suspect" because of numerous, erroneous insertions by an unknown writer.) but "his work has been treated with very great respect since it appeared in 1722."

Perhaps the most celebrated work of Scottish heraldry is the Public Register of all Arms and Bearings in Scotland, known more simply as the Public Register or even Lyon Register. It has been said that: "There is no better evidence of the diversity and splendour of heraldic art anywhere in the world than is to be found in the [Lyon Register]. . . ." The work was created under the authority of the Statute of 1672, which provided that it record all arms properly registered with the Lord Lyon. The first volume was bound in 1677 and it has been faithfully maintained from that time. Each of the series of massive volumes contains 120 pages of vellum, and it includes the work of some of Scotland's greatest heraldic artists over nearly three and one-half centuries.

== Civic heraldry ==
Scotland's civic heraldry is particularly rich with burgh arms from the 15th century still in use in the 21st.

The earliest civic heraldry seems to have been the arms of Dundee which date back 600 years.

In January 2008 a petition to matriculate armorial bearings for the City of Inverness was refused by Lord Lyon King of Arms on the grounds that there is no legal persona to which arms can be granted.

== Works referenced ==
- Agnew of Lochnaw, Sir Crispin. "Heraldic Bibliography." The Highlander. (March/April 1991).
- Brooke-Little, J.P. (revisor). Boutell's Heraldry. Frederick Warne & Co., Ltd., London, 1970.
- Burnett, Charles J and Dennis, Mark D. Scotland's Heraldic Heritage; The Lion Rejoicing The Stationery Office, Edinburgh, 1997.
- Cox, Noel. "Commonwealth Heraldic Jurisdiction." The Coat of Arms (Autumn 2005).
- Dennis, Mark. Scottish Heraldry: An Invitation Heraldry Society of Scotland, Edinburgh, 1999.
- Fox-Davies, A.C. A Complete Guide to Heraldry. (revised, Brooke-Little, J.P.) Orbis Publishing Limited, London, 1985 (originally published 1909). (of dubious authority and accuracy in matters Scots)
- Friar, Stephen (editor). A Dictionary of Heraldry. Harmony Books, New York, 1987.
- Friar, Stephen and Ferguson, John. Basic Heraldry. The Herbert Press, London, 1993.
- Innes of Learney, Sir Thomas (revisor Innes of Edingight, Malcolm R.). Scots Heraldry. Third edition. Johnston & Bacon, London & Edinburgh, 1978 (originally published 1934).
- Innes-Smith, Robert. An Outline of Heraldry in England and Scotland. Pilgrim Press Ltd., Derby, 1980.
- Nisbet, Alexander A System of Heraldry. T & A Constable, Edinburgh, 1984, first published 1722.
- Slater, Stephen. The Complete Book of Heraldry. Lorenz Books, London, 2002.
- Way of Plean, George and Squire, Romilly. Collins Scottish Clan and Family Encyclopedia. HarperCollins, Glasgow, 1994

== Additional bibliography ==
- Mackenzie of Rosehaugh, G. Scotland's Herauldrie: the Science of Herauldrie treated as a part of the Civil law and Law of Nations. Heir of Andrew Anderson, Edinburgh, 1680
- McAndrew, Bruce A. (2006). Scotland's Historic Heraldry. Boydell Press. ISBN 978-1-84383-261-4.
- Moncreiffe of Easter Moncrieffe, Iain (Kintyre Pursuivant) & Pottinger, Don (Herald Painter). Simple Heraldry - Cheerfully Illustrated. Thomas Nelson and Sons, Edinburgh and London, 1953
- Paul, Sir James Balfour (Lord Lyon King of Arms). An Ordinary of Arms Contained in the Public Register of All Arms and Bearings in Scotland. Edinburgh: W. Green & Sons, 1903
- Reid of Robertland, David and Wilson, Vivien. An Ordinary of Arms, volume 2 [1902–1973], Lyon Office, Edinburgh 1977
- Schweitzer, Leslie A and Hunter of Montlawan, David. Annotated Bibliography of Scottish Heraldic Materials - see at "Heraldry Society of Scotland website".
- Stevenson, John H and Wood, Margaret: Scottish Heraldic Seals (3 vols.), Glasgow, 1940
- Urquhart, R M. Scottish Burgh and County Heraldry Heraldry Today, London, 1973; Scottish Civic Heraldry: Regional - Islands - District Heraldry Today, London, 1979; Scottish Civic Heraldry 2 Scottish Library Association, Hamilton, 2001
