= Arcas (rocket) =

American retired sounding rocket

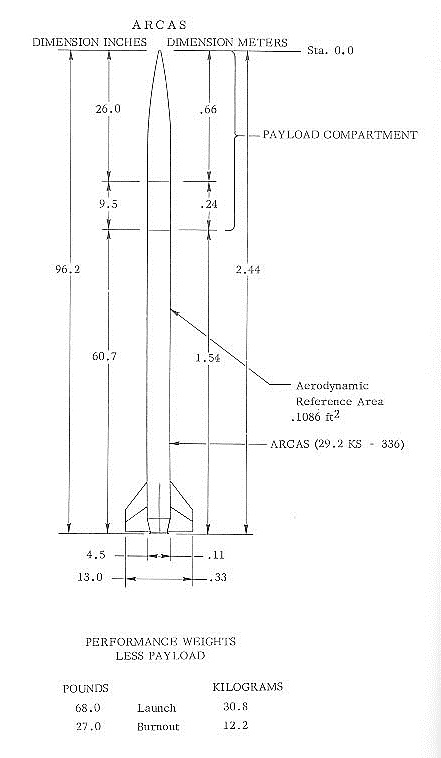
- Arcas rocket diagram
- Function: Sounding rocket
- Manufacturer: Atlantic Research Corp.
- Country of origin: United States

Size
- Height: 2.30 m (7 ft 7 in)
- Diameter: 11 cm (4.3 in)
- Mass: 34 kg (75 lb)
- Stages: 1

Launch history
- Status: Retired
- Launch sites: White Sands, Vandenberg, Fort Churchill, Point Mugu, San Nicolas, Cape Canaveral LC43, Eglin, Kronogård, Kindley, McMurdo Station, Barking Sands, CELPA (Mar Chiquita), Ascension, Birdling's Flat, Wallops Island LA2, Thumba, Barbados, Keweenaw, Thule AFB, Barreira do Inferno Launch Center, Antigua, Fort Greely, Grand Turk Island, Tartagal, Fort Sherman and Primrose Lake
- First flight: November 4, 1958
- Last flight: August 9, 1991

First stage
- Engines: SR45-AR-1
- Thrust: 1,490 N average thrust (40,430 N-s total impulse)
- Burn time: 30 seconds
- Propellant: solid

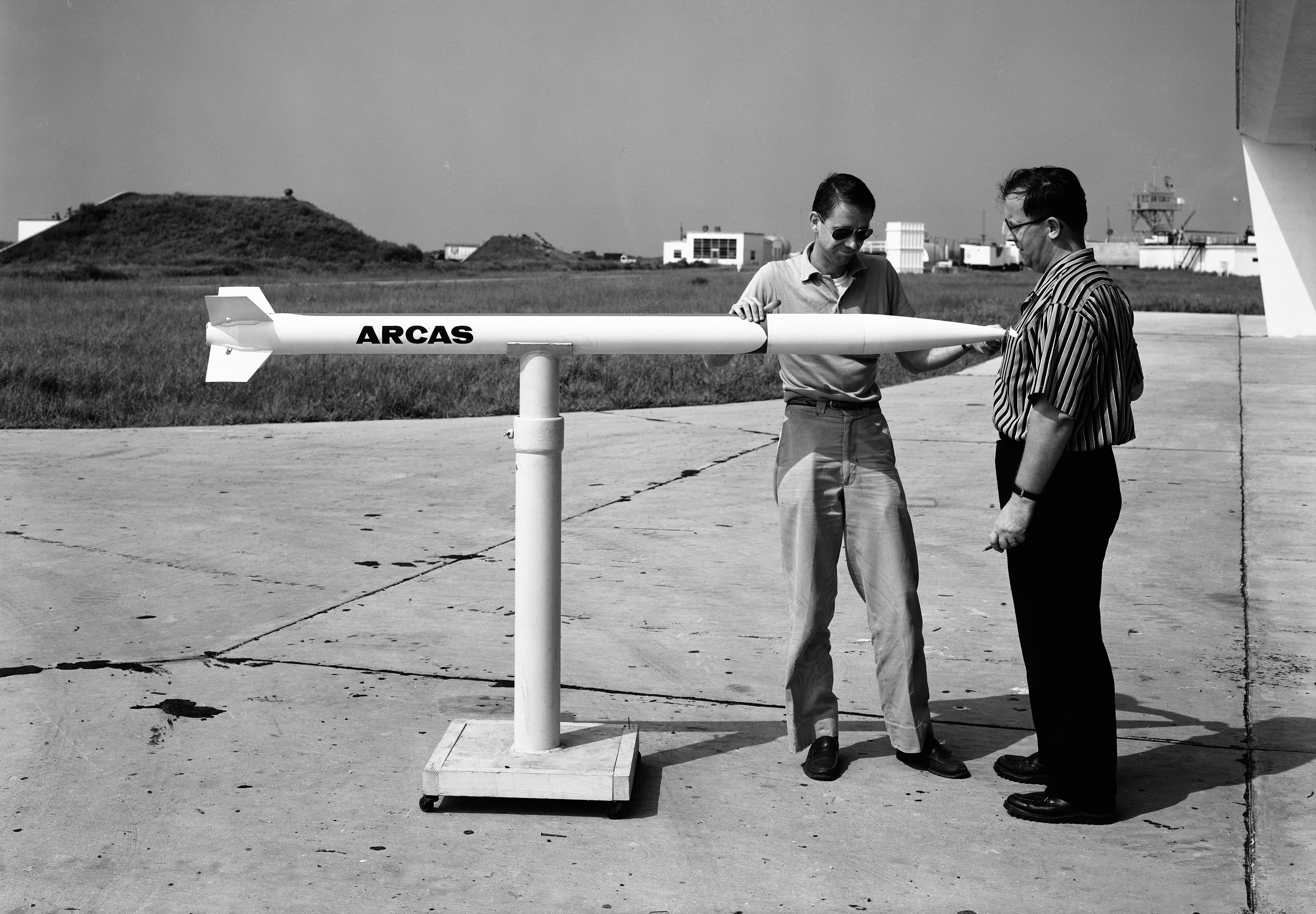
First Arcas meteorological rocket, shown at Wallops prior to flight test, July 31, 1959.

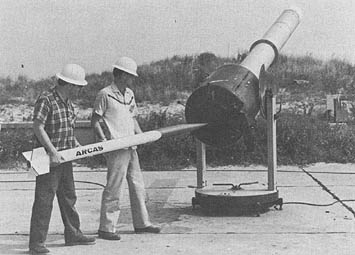
Arcas rocket being loaded into launch tube

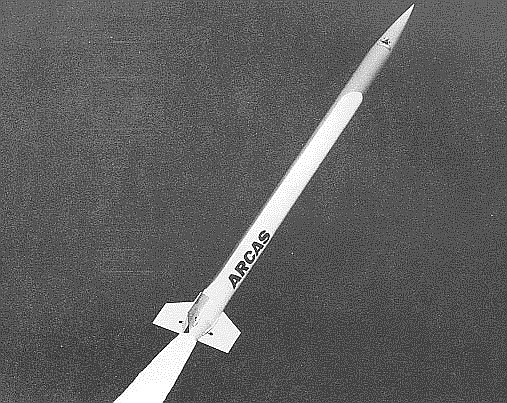
Arcas rocket in flight

Arcas (originally "All-Purpose Rocket for Collecting Atmospheric Soundings", also designated Big Boy Rocket or "PWN-6") was the designation of an American sounding rocket, developed by the Atlantic Research Corp. (now Atlantic Richfield Company (ARCO)), Alexandria, Va.

The Arcas sounding rocket was an unguided vehicle with a diameter of 4.5 inches designed to carry payloads of 12 pounds (5.4 kg) or less to heights in excess of 200,000 feet (61,000 m) when launched from sea level. The Arcas had a maximum flight altitude of 52 kilometres (32 mi), a takeoff thrust of 1.5 kN, a takeoff weight of 34 kilograms (75 lb), and a diameter of 11 centimetres (4.3 in). The Arcas was 230 centimetres (91 in) long and had a fin span of 33 centimetres (13 in).

Including variants, it was launched at least 1,441 times between November 4, 1958, and August 9, 1991. Arcas launch sites included White Sands, Vandenberg, Fort Churchill, Point Mugu, San Nicolas, Cape Canaveral LC43, Eglin, Kronogård, Kindley, McMurdo Station, Barking Sands, CELPA (Mar Chiquita), Ascension, Birdling's Flat, Wallops Island LA2, Thumba, Barbados, Keweenaw, Thule AFB, Barreira do Inferno Launch Center, Antigua, Fort Greely, Grand Turk Island, Tartagal, Fort Sherman and Primrose Lake.

== History ==
A 1957 Stanford Research Institute study proposed a small single-stage sounding rocket to measure high-altitude winds to determine the spread of radioactive fallout. The U.S. Office of Naval Research and the Air Force Research Center awarded Atlantic Research Corporation a contract to develop this sounding rocket, known as "Kitty" in January 1958. ARC designed the Arcas rocket, the first of which was ready for flight tests in late 1958. By the end of 1960, more than 400 Arcas rockets had been launched.

== Engine ==
The Arcas was powered by a slow-burning SR45-AR-1 solid-propellant motor with an end-burning grain, generating an average thrust of 336 pounds-force (1,490 N; 152 kgf) for 30 seconds. Total impulse was 9,089 lbf⋅s (40,430 N⋅s). Since the rocket diameter was larger than the nozzle diameter of the engine, the aft end of the rocket ended in a tapered "boat tail", to decrease the subsonic drag.

Arcas was launched from a tubular closed-breech launcher, which provided a faster boost by the piston action of trapping the engine gasses. The rocket was kept centered in the tube by four plastic spacers.

== Variants ==
=== Arcas use with DMQ-6 telemetry ===
When used for radar calibration in the 1960s, the Arcas rocket configuration consisted of a closed breech launcher, a sounding rocket, and two payload configurations, one a parachute recovery system with a DMQ-6 telemetry transmitter compatible with standard meteorological ground station receiving equipment, the other a one-meter metalized balloon for radar calibration. The Arcas characteristics for this type operation were:

DMQ-6

Nominal payload: 12 pounds (5.4 kg)
Maximum altitude: 210,000 feet (64,000 m)
Time to maximum altitude: 128 seconds

Balloon

Nominal payload: 7 pounds (3.2 kg)
Maximum altitude: 300,000 feet (91,000 m)
Time to maximum altitude: 134 seconds

Rocket:

Altitude at burnout: 47,300 feet (14,400 m)
Launch velocity: 150 ft/s (46 m/s).
Total rocket weight: 77 pounds (35 kg)
Outside dimension of tail: 4.45 inches (113 mm)

Transmitter:

Robin balloon cross section
DMQ-6 transmitter cross section

=== Kitty ===
A variants of the basic Arcas were the Atlantic Research PWN-6A and 6B "Kitty". These had a ceiling of 60 kilometres (37 mi).

=== Rooster ===
Another variant of the basic Arcas was the PWN-7 "Rooster". It had a ceiling of 65 km.

=== Sidewinder Arcas ===
The Sidewinder Arcas was a two-stage sounding rocket, consisting of a Sidewinder starting stage and an Arcas upper stage. The Sidewinder Arcas had a ceiling of 90 kilometres (56 mi), a takeoff thrust of 26 kN, a takeoff weight of 120 kilograms (260 lb), a diameter of 13 centimetres (5.1 in) and a length of 4.8 metres (16 ft).

=== Super Arcas ===
A higher power version of the Arcas, Super Arcas, was used extensively around the world from a wide variety of platforms on land and at sea. With a boost from a gas generator-fed launch tube, Super Arcas was capable of reaching altitudes as high as 100 kilometres (62 mi). There were many time-based weather experiments launched on this rocket due to the ability of the launch tube to be rapidly turned around for another launch. One of those experiments launched one rocket per hour for 24 hours straight in Antarctica.

=== Boosted Arcas ===
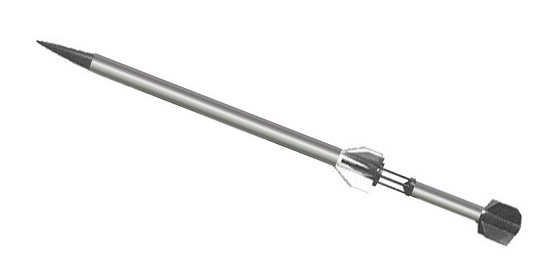
Boosted Arcas sounding rocket shape

Another variation of Arcas was called the Boosted Arcas, which was a 2-stage rocket; one Arcas second stage and one booster.

=== Sparrow Arcas ===
Sparrow Arcas was a two stage vehicle, composed of a Sparrow first stage and an Arcas second stage.

=== Frangible Arcas ===
Frangible Arcas was an experimental variation launched four times between 1964 and 1965. Rocket was designed to fragment after payload separation, reducing the risk to populated areas from falling spent rocket motor.

== See also ==
- Skua - British sounding rocket with a similar flight profile
