= Keweenaw Rocket Range =

Rocket launch site in Michigan

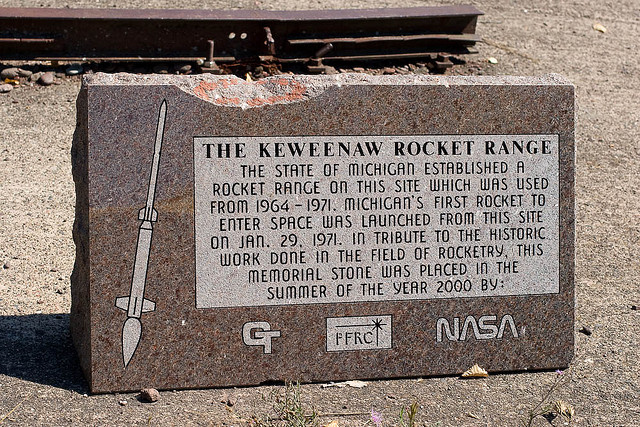
- Commemorative monument at the Keweenaw Rocket Range.
- Map showing the location of the Range at the tip of the peninsula
- Launch site: Keweenaw Peninsula
- Location: 47°25′48″N 87°43′1″W
- Operator: NASA & University of Michigan
- Total launches: Unknown
Launch history
- Status: Inactive
- Launches: Unknown
- First launch: 1964
- Last launch: 1971

The Keweenaw Rocket Range is an isolated launch pad located in the U.S. state of Michigan’s Keweenaw Peninsula. It was used between 1964 and 1971 for launching rockets for meteorological data collection. NASA, along with the University of Michigan, conducted the project under the lead of Harold Allen. The site was one of six similar sites scattered about North America used to collect measurements of electron density, positive ion composition and distribution, energetic electron precipitation, solar X-rays, and Lyman alpha flux.

One of the other well-known sites was Wallops Island, Virginia. The collected data was later to be compared to the five other sites.

== Smaller rockets ==
In the early stages of the project, smaller rockets were launched off a floating buoy between the on-land rocket site and Manitou Island, about 2.5 miles (4.0 km) off shore. These smaller rockets were commonly known as Mighty Mouse rockets for they were only a few feet tall and had folding fins. There were approximately 50 of these rockets launched from the floating buoy.

== Larger rockets ==
There were two types of larger rockets launched from the site, Arcas at about six feet and the much larger Nike Apache rockets. Both of these rockets were two-stage rockets that could carry a substantial payload. The Nike Apache rockets weighed about 1,700 lb (770 kg), were over 28 feet (8.5 m) tall and reached an altitude of almost 100 miles (160 km).

== Project WEBROC ==
In 1965 the Keweenaw site was utilized for a project called WEBROC. The goal of project WEBROC was to be able to set up a system of buoys, containing rocket launchers, in the ocean to obtain weather information. The small rockets would contain payloads of various instrumentations. The rockets that were used on the buoy were small 2.75-inch folding-fin rockets called “Mighty Mouse.” The rockets were to be housed in an enclosed launcher to help protect them from the elements. This being the case developers needed to know if the rockets could be launched from a closed-breech launcher. This was the testing that was done at the Keweenaw Rocket Launch Site.

== Location ==
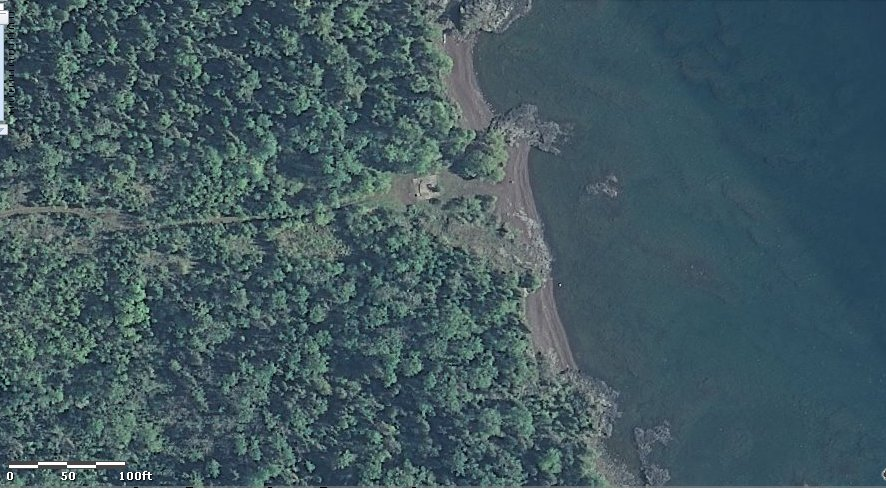
Rocket Range is the small square structure along the coast

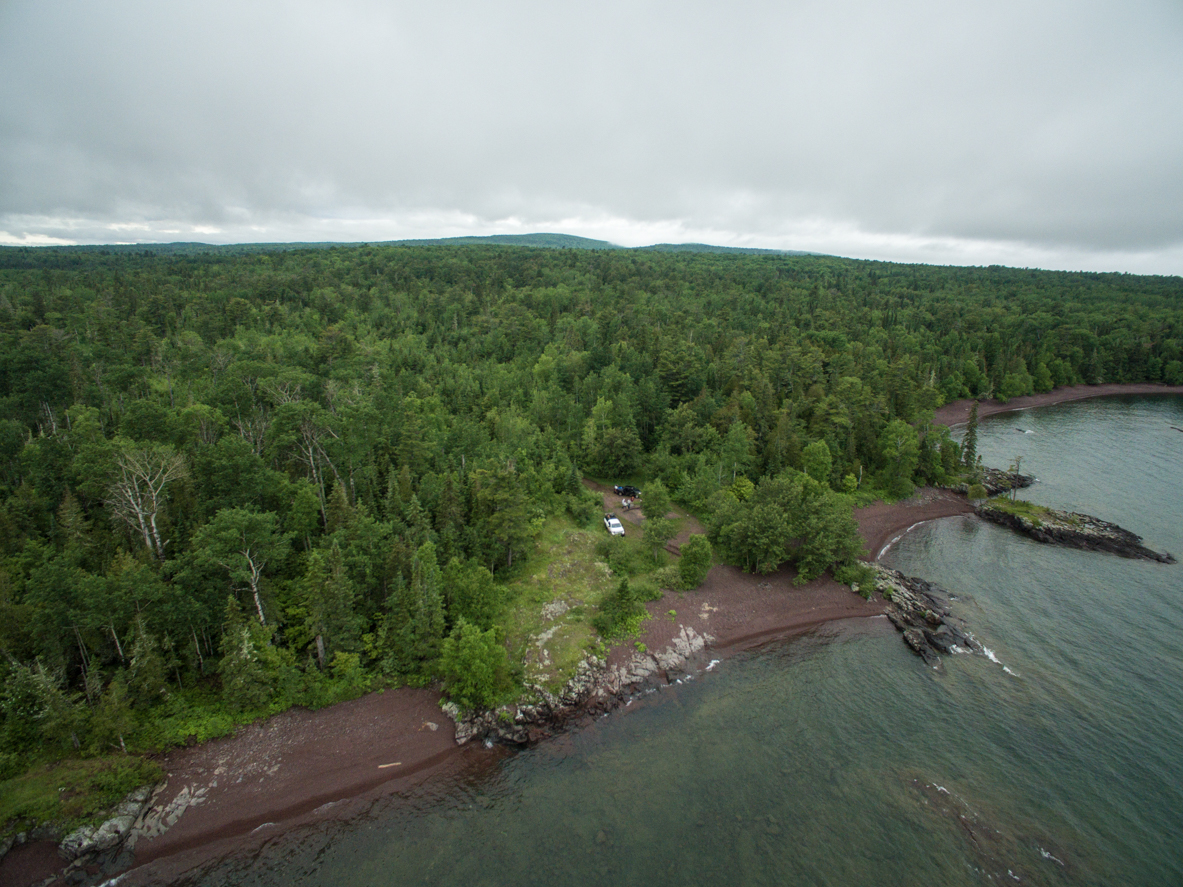
Aerial image overlooking the site of the Keweenaw Rocket Range

The site is accessible to visitors with the time and patience to get there. Little remains other than a memorial marker and a concrete pad with an iron rail in an arc shape attached to it that is inscribed with degree markings. The view of Lake Superior and Manitou Island is spectacular from the site. The coordinates of the site are 47°25′48″N 87°43′1″W. To get to the site, interested visitors must drive north on US 41 up to Copper Harbor and proceed about five miles (8.0 km) to the end of US 41. From there, visitors can follow a seasonal road about 4.5 miles (7.2 km) to an ATV trail that leads to the site.

The project was originally proposed by the University of Michigan’s Institute of Science and Technology. The rocket launchings were to be part of the Meteorological Rocket Network and the main goal of the project was to gather inland weather data. Three University of Michigan professors along with two Michigan Technological University professors and two employees from the White Sands missile range were the minimum crew for the missile range.
