= Kronogård =

Rocket launch site in Sweden

Kronogård is the name of a launch site for sounding rockets in North Sweden at 66°13′N 19°47′E. Kronogård was originally a hunting post for royal foresters and hunters. In the 1950s a rocket launch site was established, from which mainly rockets of the type Nike Cajun were launched to explore the upper atmosphere. After completion of Esrange Kronogard was shut down.

Nowadays there is an area with small houses (partly on the basements of the former launch pads) and a camping site.

== Launch list ==
| Date | Vehicle | Mission | Results |
|---|---|---|---|
| 14 Aug 1961 | Arcas | (IOM) | EF |
| 07 Aug 1962 | Nike-Cajun | K62-1 (AFCRL/IOM) | S (109 km) |
| ?? Aug 1962 | Arcas | K62-2 (IOM) | |
| 11 Aug 1962 | Nike-Cajun | K62-3 (AFCRL/IOM) | S (69 km) |
| 19 Aug 1962 | Nike-Cajun | K62-4 (AFCRL/IOM) | S (109 km) |
| 31 Aug 1962 | Nike-Cajun | K62-5 (AFCRL/IOM) | S (111 km) |
| 27 Jul 1963 | Nike-Cajun | K63-1 (IOM) | S |
| 29 Jul 1963 | Nike-Cajun | K63-2 (IOM) | S |
| 01 Aug 1963 | Nike-Cajun | K63-3 (IOM) | S |
| 07 Aug 1963 | Nike-Cajun | K63-4 (IOM) | S |
| 06 Aug 1964 | Nike-Apache | NASA 14.55DA (AFCRL/IOM) | EF (125 km) |
| 07 Aug 1964 | Nike-Cajun | NASA 10.138GA (GSFC) | S (130 km) |
| 12 Aug 1964 | Nike-Apache | NASA 14.56DA (AFCRL/IOM) | S (122 km) |
| 12 Aug 1964 | Nike-Cajun | NASA 10.139GA (GSFC) | EF |
| 16 Aug 1964 | Nike-Apache | NASA 14.57DA (AFCRL/IOM) | S (119 km) |
| 16 Aug 1964 | Nike-Cajun | NASA 10.140GA (GSFC/IOM) | S (135 km) |
| 17 Aug 1964 | Nike-Apache | NASA 14.58DA (AFCRL/IOM) | S (124 km) |
| 17 Aug 1964 | Nike-Cajun | NASA 10.141GA (GSFC/IOM) | S (122 km) |
