= Interstellar Technologies =

Japanese rocket company

Coordinates: 42°28′30″N 143°22′35″E

Interstellar Technologies, Inc.
- Type: Private KK
- Industry: Space
- Founded: January 2013; 13 years ago
- Headquarters: 149-7, Memu, Taiki, Hiroo-gun, Hokkaido 089-2113, Japan
- Area served: Japan
- Products: Launch vehicles
- Services: Commercial space transportation services
- Website: www.istellartech.com/en

Interstellar Technologies, Inc. (Japanese: インターステラテクノロジズ（株）, Hepburn: Intāsutera Tekunorojizu (kabu)), or IST, is a Japanese private spaceflight company aiming to eventually build a launch vehicle for small satellites under 100 kg. It is a rocket spacelaunch company developing the MOMO (also Momo, etc.) sounding rocket and the orbital launch vehicles called ZERO and DECA. Interstellar's stated goal is to reduce the cost of access to space. Interstellar is attempting to have the first privately developed rocket in Japan to reach space.

== History ==
The group that became Interstellar Technologies was created as a hobbyist organization in 1997. Interstellar Technologies predecessor company was established in 2003 by Takafumi Horie, who previously founded the ISP Livedoor. It was established to develop rockets to launch small satellites. It became Interstellar Technologies in 2005 (some sources name the year 2013 as the founding year of Interstellar Technologies).

In 2017, it became the first Japanese company to launch a privately developed space rocket, though the launch was unsuccessful. A subsequent test in 2019 was successful at taking a 20 kg payload on a suborbital trajectory to the edge of space. As of 2017, the company planned to develop a rocket by 2020 that would be capable of launching small satellites into orbit. As of 2018, the president is Takahiro Inagawa.

In March 2018, Interstellar entered into a business alliance with Nippon Travel Agency and Space Development Corp. In May 2018, Interstellar received an investment of ¥19.8 million from Kushiro Manufacturing.

As of June 2018, the company had raised about ¥30 million (about US$250,000) in crowdfunding.

In January 2025, Interstellar received a $44 million investment from Woven by Toyota.

== Rockets ==
=== MOMO sounding rocket ===
The initial rocket the company is developing is the MOMO sounding rocket:

- First launch: 30 July 2017 (failure)
- First successful launch: 3 May 2019 (UTC)
- Launch attempts: 7 (3 successful)
- Height: 10 m (33 ft)
- Diameter: 50 cm (20 in)
- Mass: 1 tonne (0.98 long tons; 1.1 short tons)
- Apogee: 100 km (62 mi), capable of reaching the Kármán line or the boundary of space.
- Payload to Kármán line: 20 kg (44 lb)
- Engine: Custom Helium Pressure-fed engine with 12 kilonewtons of thrust
- Propellants: Ethanol with Liquid Oxygen (LOX)
- Attitude control: Gimballed thrust for steering, cold gas thrusters for roll control
- Cost: ¥50 million (~$440 thousand)

==== MOMO v1 ====
In response to the problems encountered in the engine nozzle and ignitor during the fifth launch and in the first attempt of the sixth launch (June and July 2020 respectively) Interstellar Technology began development of a full system upgrade. During a video conference on June 1, 2021 they announced the end of the upgrading process that focused on engine system, airframe equipment, avionics, and ground support equipment resulting in new nozzles, new igniters, an increase in dry mass by 40 kg, in propellant mass by 30 kg, in length by 0.2 m and in thrust by 2 kN. Due to the heavy modifications performed the company started referring to the previous version of the rocket as MOMO v0, while the upgraded one is now being called MOMO v1.

==== MOMO flight testing ====
The flight test program began in mid-2017:

Flight No.	Date (UTC)	Launch site	Suborbital apogee or achieved altitude	Outcome
1	30 July 2017	Taiki, Hokkaido, Japan	20 km (12 mi)	Failure
1	Rocket failed after launch. Contact was lost 66 seconds after launch, triggering an emergency engine shutdown. The rocket reached an altitude of 20 km (12 mi). This represented the first privately funded space rocket to be launched in Japan. The launch cost about ¥50 million (US$440,000).			
2	30 June 2018	Taiki, Hokkaido, Japan		Failure
2	Four seconds after liftoff, the rocket came crashing back down onto the pad, exploding violently.			
3	4 May 2019	Taiki, Hokkaido, Japan	113.4 km (70.5 mi)	Success
3	The first commercially developed Japanese rocket to reach the Kármán line, the internationally recognized edge of space. The rocket landed in the sea. The countdown to the launch used the singing synthesizer software Hatsune Miku.			
4	27 July 2019	Taiki, Hokkaido, Japan	13 km (8.1 mi)	Failure
4	Failed (onboard computer detected a problem and shut down the engine early) shortly after liftoff. The rocket reached altitude of 13 km and fell into sea 9 km offshore. The rocket carried some experiments, for example a heat-resistant paper plane to be released from space, and a low-frequency sound sensor developed by Kochi University of Technology to observe sound created by lightning, typhoons and volcanic eruptions.			
5	14 June 2020	Taiki, Hokkaido, Japan	11.5 km (7.1 mi)	Failure
5	About 35 seconds into flight, shortly after reaching max-Q, sparks were observed near the engine nozzle. About thirty seconds later, ground controllers issued an abort command which caused the rocket to tumble and fall into the ocean.			
6	3 July 2021	Taiki, Hokkaido, Japan	99 km (62 mi)	Success
6	First flight of the improved version MOMO v1. It reached an apogee of 99 km and landed in the sea 10 minutes after liftoff. The rocket was named Screw Rocket by the main sponsor of the launch, Sunco Industries Co., and carried an infrasound sensor from the Kochi University of Technology. A single rose from Hana-Cupid was also launched on this flight. Despite the MOMO unit's number (F7), this was the sixth flight of the sounding rocket.			
7	31 July 2021	Taiki, Hokkaido, Japan	92.3 km (57.4 mi)	Success
7	Second flight of the improved version MOMO v1. Despite the MOMO unit's number (F6), this was the seventh flight of the sounding rocket. The company aimed to reach space for the third time. Featuring a special, red paint job as well as the slogan "Love and Freedom and TENGA" painted on the side, the rocket was named TENGA Rocket after the sponsor, sex toy manufacturer Tenga Co., Ltd., which was also the first ever single sponsor received by Interstellar Technologies. It carried out payload release and recovery mission (unknown if it was successful), the first time for a private entity in Japan. A special masturbator outfitted with sensors was launched along the rocket, aiding development of TENGA's namesake series development for use in space.			

=== ZERO orbital rocket ===
The ZERO launch vehicle is aimed at orbital launches of smallsats.

- First launch: 2027 (planned)
- Payload to 500 km (310 mi) Sun-Synchronous Orbit: 250 kg (550 lb)
- Fuel: Liquid biomethane (LBM)

=== DECA orbital rocket ===
On 25 January 2023, IST announced plans to develop the DECA launch vehicle.

DECA is a larger launch vehicle that can build small satellite constellations, launch large satellites into orbit, and transport cargo to the International Space Station, thereby contributing to the expansion of Japan’s space transportation capabilities. DECA will also be responsible for launching the satellite constellation targeted by the satellite developer Our Stars, a wholly owned subsidiary of IST.

== Launch site ==
The launch site of IST resides next to the Taiki Aerospace Research Field of the Japan Aerospace Exploration Agency, located within the Taiki Multi-Purpose Aerospace Park, which is an aerodrome in Taiki, Hokkaido, Japan.

Launch Complex-0 (LC-0) is the launch site for MOMO and the static engine test facility for MOMO and ZERO.

Launch Complex-1 (LC-1) is a new launch pad for ZERO and is planned to be available in FY2023. LC-1 will include a Vehicle Assembly Building (VAB) and development and test facilities. LC-1 will be equipped with an exhaust duct to reduce noise from the engine jet and minimize damage to the satellite from vibration.

Launch Complex-2 (LC-2) is another launch pad designed for more frequent launches of ZERO and is planned to be available in FY2025. LC-2 will include a Vehicle Assembly Building (VAB) capable of preparing multiple launch vehicles simultaneously.

In April 2021, a plan to expand the park into a private sector spaceport, Hokkaido Spaceport, was announced. The current 1000-meter runway is planned to be extended to 1300 meters, and building a new 3000-meter runway is also considered.

== See also ==
- Blue Origin
- PD AeroSpace, Japanese spaceplane developer
- Rocket Lab
- SpaceX
