= Taiki Multi-Purpose Aerospace Park =

Japanese aerospace facility

Coordinates: 42°30′00″N 143°26′29″E

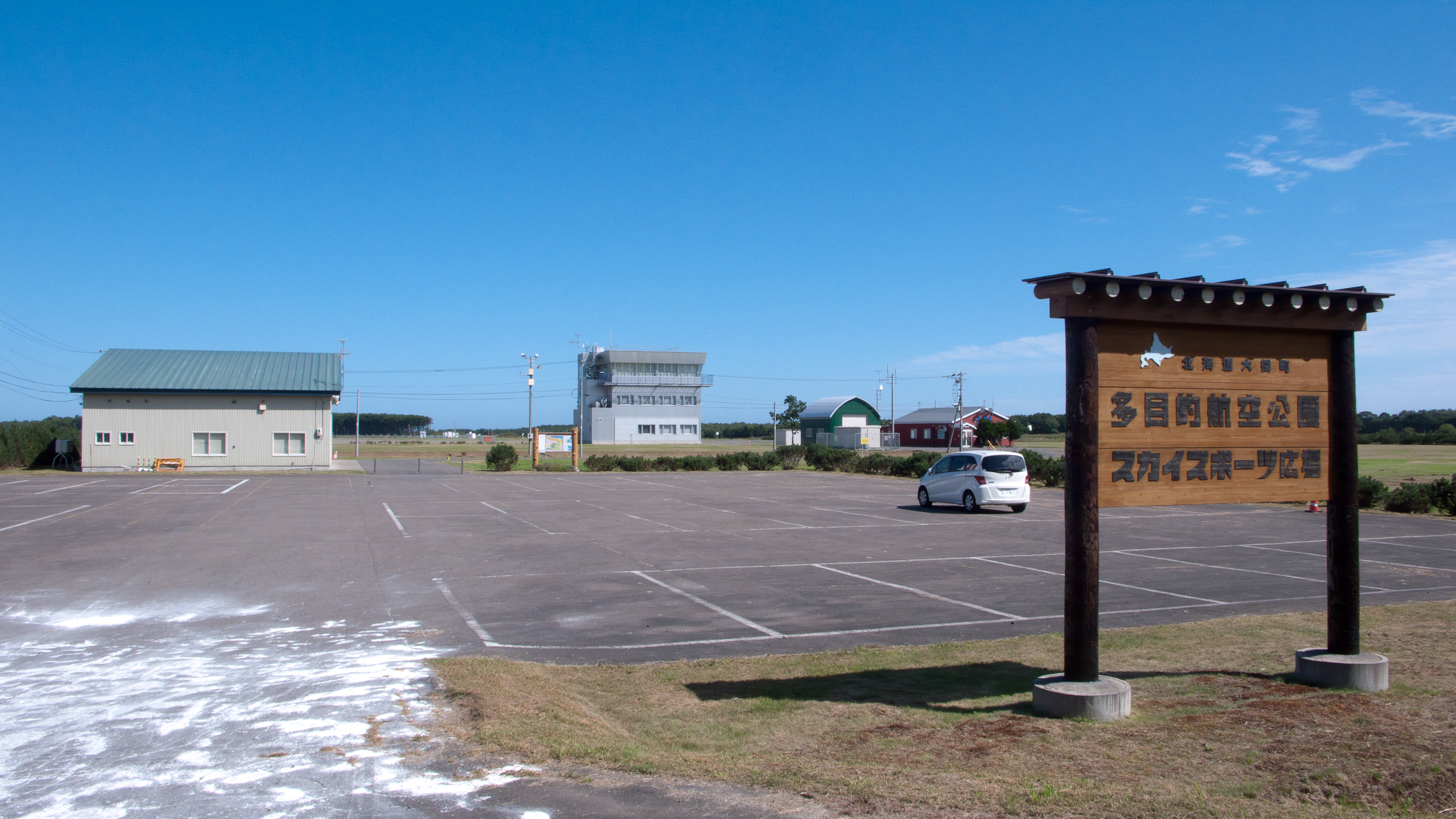
Taiki Multi-Purpose Aerospace Park in 2010

The Taiki Multi-Purpose Aerospace Park (Japanese: 大樹町多目的航空公園, Hepburn: Taiki-chō Tamokuteki Kōkū Kōen) is an aerodrome in the town of Taiki, Hokkaido, Japan.

== Taiki Aerospace Research Field ==
Taiki Aerospace Research Field (Japanese: 大樹航空宇宙実験場, Hepburn: Taiki Kōkū Uchū Jikkenjō) is a research field of the Japan Aerospace Exploration Agency (JAXA) located in this park. It is used for aerospace experiments, such as high-altitude balloon launches. JAXA's Aeronautical Technology Directorate and Institute of Space and Astronautical Science (ISAS) use the following facilities:

- Flight Test Building
- Flight Control Building
- JAXA's Hangar
- Balloon Operation Building
- Weather Observation Equipment
- Handling Area
- Sliding Launcher for a Scientific Balloon

== Hokkaido Spaceport ==
Rocket launch pad of Interstellar Technologies (IST) resides next to the field. In April 2021, a plan to expand the park to build a private sector spaceport, Hokkaido Spaceport, was announced. The launch pad currently used by IST for the sounding rockets is called Launch Complex-0. Launch Complex-1, the new launch pad for orbital launch is planned to start construction in 2024, and another pad Launch Complex-2 is planned. The runway was extended from 1000 m to 1300 m by 2024. Possibility of new 3000 m runway is under investigation.
