= Brady Brim-DeForest =

American businessman, author and antiquarian (born 1984)

Brady Brim-DeForest OStJ FRAI FRGS KSS
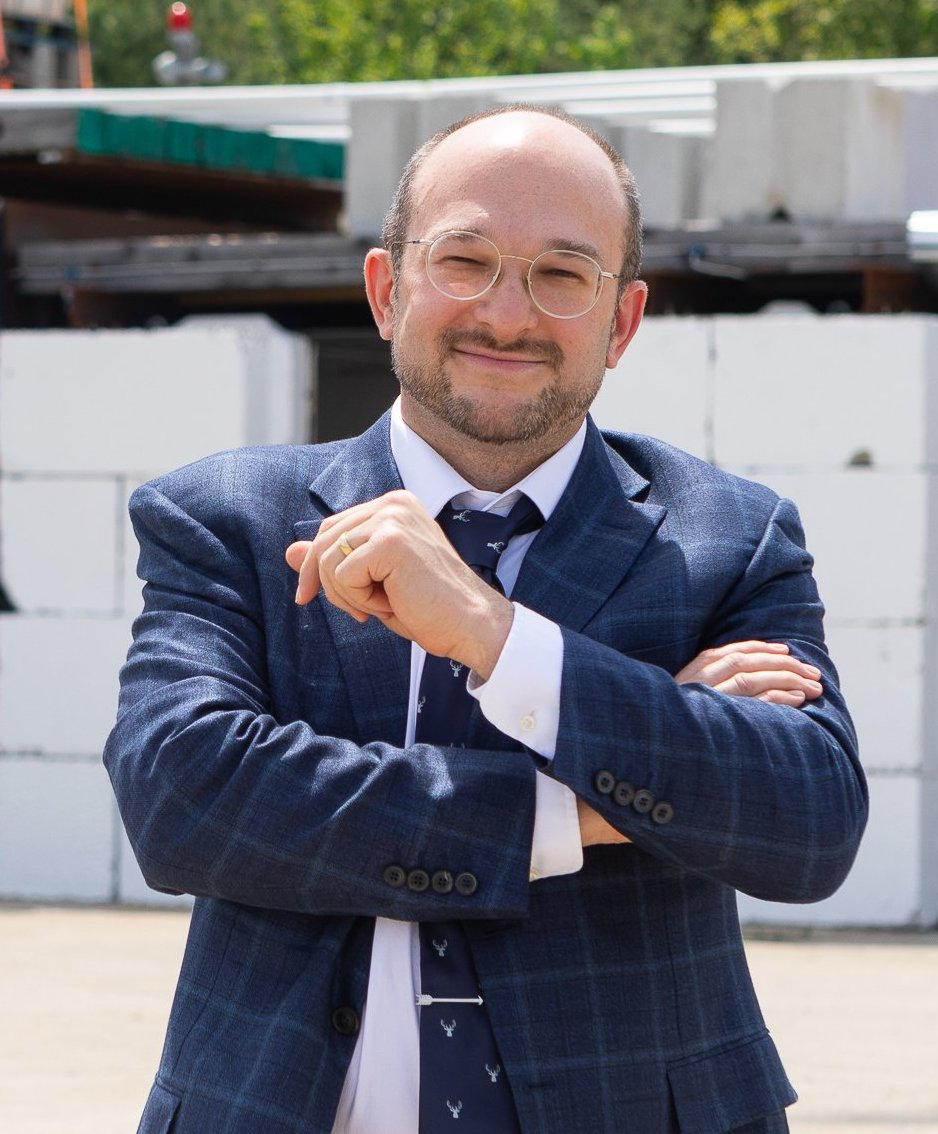
- Brim-DeForest in 2024
- Born: Brady Daine Brim-DeForest; 5 March 1984 (age 42); United States
- Education: University of Southern California
- Occupation: Businessman
- Known for: Tubefilter; Streamy Awards.monks
- Spouse: Jessica Eriksen
- Children: 3
- Website: brimdeforest.com

Brady Brim-DeForest (born 5 March 1984) is an American entrepreneur, investor, philanthropist, and author. He is the CEO of Formula.Monks, the technology consulting division of .monks, and is the chairman of BluShift Aerospace. He is the founder and first CEO of Tubefilter and creator of the Streamy Awards.

== Career ==
In 2008, Brim-DeForest co-founded Tubefilter, a media company focused on the online video industry, acquiring competitor Tilzy.TV and launching a video analytics platform, Filterbase. In 2009, he launched the Streamy Awards, which recognizes excellence in online video and web television. The event was later brought to television through a co-production partnership with Dick Clark Productions. Brim-DeForest was a founding board member of the International Academy of Web Television.

In the early 2010s, Brim-DeForest launched Overwatch, an IOT security service. In 2013, he founded OpenPlay, a supply chain and distribution platform for the music industry.

In 2017, he became CEO of TheoremOne, an engineering and consulting firm, which merged with S4 Capital in 2022.

Brim-DeForest is a co-founder of .monks, a marketing and technology services firm. In 2023, he became the CEO of Formula.Monks, which provides digital transformation and innovation services.

In 2021, Brim-DeForest launched TheoremOne Orbital to provide services to the satellite and launch services markets. He invested in BluShift Aerospace, an aerospace startup. In June 2024, he became the chairman of BluShift Aerospace.

== Personal life ==
In 2017, Brim-DeForest succeeded to the title of Baron of Balvaird in the Baronage of Scotland by way of assignation after acquiring the title, and the castle of the same name, from its previous owner, the 9th Earl of Mansfield. Brim-DeForest is also the Seigneur de Feauville, a title held by virtue of his ownership of a fief on the island of Guernsey, which he acquired in 2025, as well as being the current Lord of Bowland and of the Fells in England since 2023.

In 2023, Brim-DeForest donated $1 million to the New England Historic Genealogical Society (NEHGS) in support of its library and archival collections. In recognition of the gift, the library was renamed the Brim-DeForest Library in 2025.

In 2024, Brim-DeForest funded the publication of the oldest armorial in North America, the Gore Roll. In 2026, he supported the restoration of the Arundel 3 manuscript at the College of Arms in London.

== Honours ==
Brim-DeForest was appointed a member of the Most Venerable Order of Saint John by Queen Elizabeth II in April 2021, and he was promoted to the rank of Officer by King Charles III in April 2024. He was made a Knight of the Pontifical Equestrian Order of Saint Sylvester in 2026 by Pope Leo XIV.

- OStJ – Officer of the Most Venerable Order of Saint John, 2024.
- KSS – Knight of the Pontifical Equestrian Order of Saint Sylvester, 2026.

=== Armorial bearings ===
Brim-DeForest has been granted coats of arms in multiple jurisdictions. He was granted arms by the Lord Lyon King of Arms in Scotland in January 2020, by the Chief Herald of Malta in Malta in 2022, and by the College of Arms in England in 2025.

Coat of arms of Brady Brim-DeForest of Balvaird & Blairlogie
Notes Granted by the Lord Lyon King of Arms in January 2020. Crest Upon a Helm with a Wreath Argent and Gules, A demi lion rampant Or armed and langued Azure holding in its paws a swallow tailed Pennon Azure charged with a cross pattée Argent. Escutcheon Parted per chevron Gules and Argent, two acorns slipped Or and in base a fleur-de-lys Azure. Motto Un Cran Plus Loin (One Step Further). Badge A Fleur de Lys environed by a Sprig of Oak fructed and a Sprig of Thistle flowered stems crossed in base Or. Other versions English crest: Upon a Helm Issuing from a Chapeau Gules turned up Argent a demi Lion Or supporting with the paws a Staff proper flying therefore a Pennon per fess Azure and Gules charged with a Fleur de Lys environed by a Sprig of Oak fructed and a Sprig of Thistle flowered stems crossed in base Or. Mantled Gules doubled Argent. Maltese achievement: The same as his Scottish arms, with the addition of a comital coronet to his crest and above his shield as well as the grant of supporters (Dexter, a Lion salient gardant Or armed and langued Azure adorned with a Comital coronet and holding in its lower paw a small rock proper; Sinister, a tur salient Argent armed and unguled Or gorged with a Comital coronet and chained Or, which chain reflected over the back ends in an annulet of the Same) upon a rocky compartment proper.

== See also ==
- Balvaird Castle
- Blairlogie Castle
- Oak Hall

Baronage of Scotland
Preceded by 9th Earl of Mansfield	Baron of Balvaird; 2017–present	Incumbent; Heir apparent: Huxley Brim-DeForest
