= Ryori =

Rocket launching site in Japan

Ryori was a launching site for sounding rockets in Japan at 39°02′N 141°50′E in Iwate Prefecture. It was operated by Japan Meteorological Agency, in use since April 1970 until March 2001.
