= Naval Aviation Ordnance Test Station =

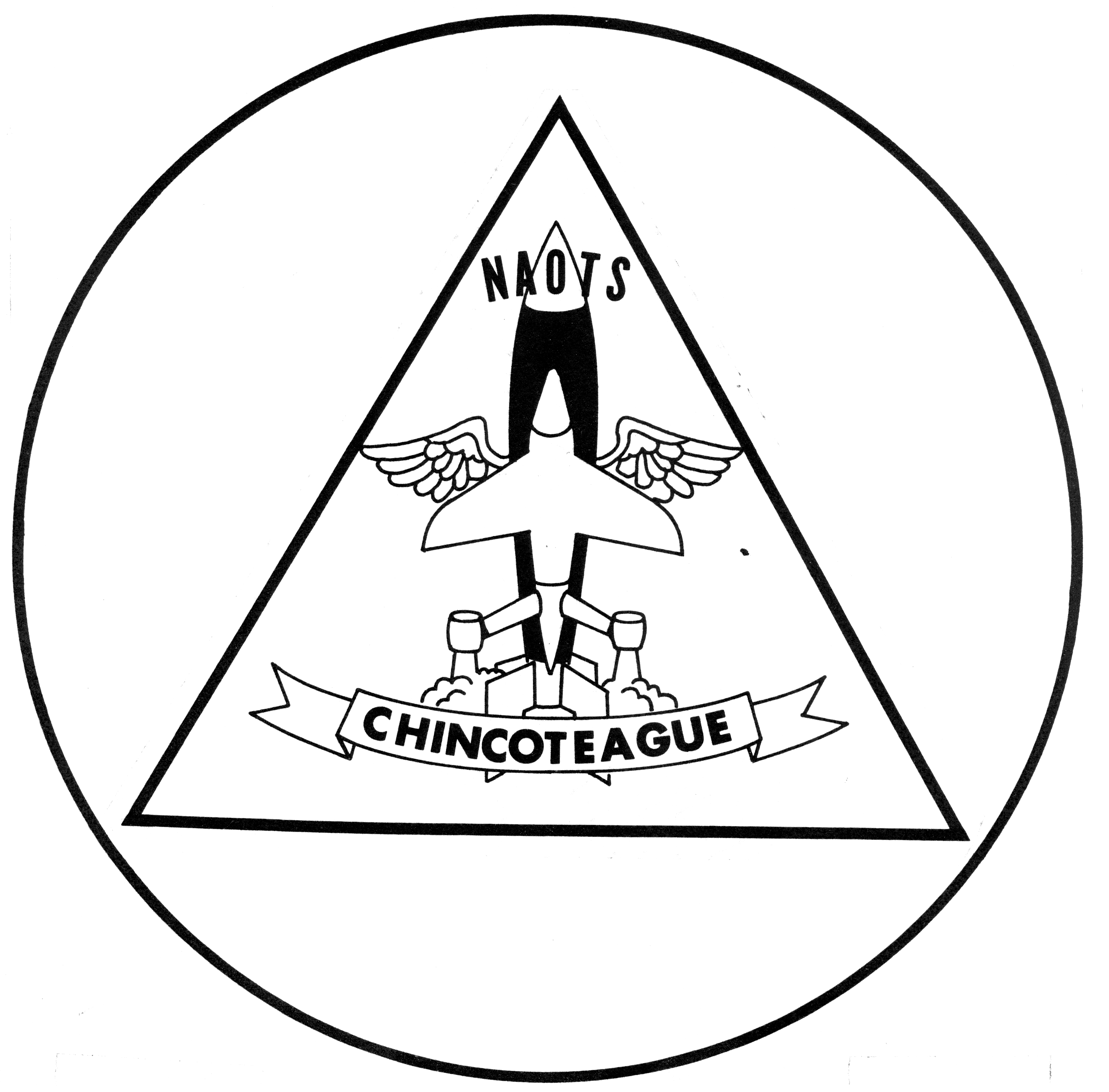
Logo of NAOTS

The Naval Aviation Ordnance Test Station (NAOTS) was a United States Navy base located at 37°55′N 75°22′W, near Chincoteague, VA, that was used as a suborbital launch site. In 1955, research rockets of the Rockair type were launched from F2H-2 planes based there. An altitude of 54,864 m (180,000 ft) was reached with a 70mm (2.75-in.) folded-fin aerial rocket (FFAR) of Korean vintage. In spite of successful tests, the rockair concept never achieved the popularity of the rockoon. Apparently no important scientific rocket research was carried out with rockaires, in contrast to the hundreds of rockoons fired during the 1950s.

In 1959, NASA acquired NAOTS and parts of the station were incorporated into the Wallops Island facility, later named Wallops Flight Facility.
