= BluShift Aerospace =

American aerospace manufacturer

- Type: Launch services
- Industry: Aerospace
- Founded: March 2014; 12 years ago
- Founders: Sascha Deri
- Headquarters: 2 Pegasus Street, Suite 2, Brunswick, Maine, United States
- Key people: Sascha Deri, CEO; David Hayrikyan, CTO; Luke Saindon, SME; Brady Brim-DeForest, Chairman
- Products: Boosters; Hybrid rocket engines Biofuel; Launch vehicles
- Services: Sub-orbital and orbital transportation
- Number of employees: 20 (2024)
- Website: blushiftaerospace.com

Blu Shift Aerospace (stylized as BluShift) is an American aerospace manufacturer headquartered in Brunswick, Maine, with an additional office in Concord, California. Founded in 2014, the company develops hybrid rocket engines and boosters for hypersonics use cases powered by plant-derived biofuels for launching small satellites and supporting sub-orbital research missions.

The company has received funding from the United States Air Force, NASA's Small Business Innovation Research program, and the Maine Technology Institute. The company is an affiliate of the Maine Space Grant Consortium.

== History ==
=== Early development (2014-2020) ===
Sascha Deri founded BluShift Aerospace in 2014. In 2016, the company relocated from Massachusetts to Brunswick Landing in Maine, utilizing the aerospace infrastructure of the former Naval Air Station. This move provided access to testing facilities and technical staff needed for developing the company's experimental rockets.

In 2017, the Maine Technology Institute awarded funding for BluShift's bio-fuel development efforts. In 2019, the company received a Small Business Innovation Research (SBIR) grant from NASA to support work on a modular hybrid rocket engine design. BluShift's first launch was originally planned for 2019 however it was delayed due to various factors, including the COVID-19 pandemic. By 2020, the company had conducted 154 static fire tests of its hybrid propulsion system in preparation for its first launch.

=== First launch (2021) ===
On January 31, 2021, BluShift Aerospace conducted the launch of its Stardust 1.0 prototype rocket from Loring Air Force Base in Limestone, Maine. The 20-foot (6-meter) rocket reached an altitude of approximately 4,100 feet (1,250 meters) and was recovered via parachute. The company estimated the total cost of the launch to be under $500,000. It was the first commercial rocket launch that was powered by bio-derived fuel.

The vehicle carried three experimental payloads housed in 3U CubeSat enclosures, provided by Kellogg Research Lab, Rocket Insights, and Falmouth High School.

=== Commercial development (2021-2023) ===
Following the launch of Stardust 1.0, BluShift Aerospace expanded its commercial and technical operations. In March 2021, the company launched a public crowdfunding campaign with an initial goal of $500,000. By April 2022, the campaign had exceeded its target, raising over $1.1 million from more than 1,000 investors worldwide.

In June 2021, BluShift entered a commercial agreement with Max IQ, a Virginia-based company, to provide launch services for up to 60 small satellites over multiple years, with a planned launch frequency of twice per year.

To support future launch operations, BluShift selected a site near Jonesport and Beals, Maine (approximately 30 miles east of Bar Harbor) after site evaluations and regulatory review. The location was planned to support coastal missions to polar and sun-synchronous orbits. However, in March 2022, BluShift abandoned plans to build a spaceport in Jonesport following opposition from residents.

=== Recent activities (2023-2026) ===
In June 2024, BluShift raised a seed round of $1.3 million led by Late Stage Capital and Late Stage's founder, Brady Brim-DeForest, joined the BluShift board as chairman. In October 2024, BluShift completed a 60-second static fire test of the MAREVL (Modular Adaptable Rocket Engine for Vehicle Launch) 2.0 engine with active throttling. The test concluded a $1.1 million contract with the U.S. Air Force focused on evaluating the engine for booster-stage propulsion applications.

As of January 2025, BluShift was preparing for the first launch of its Starless Rogue suborbital rocket, expected to carry commercial payloads. In January 2025, the company was pursuing a $15 million equity round to fund the first launch of its suborbital rocket from Spaceport America in New Mexico. In April 2025, BluShift completed a hybrid rocket engine test at Brunswick Landing. In mid-2025, BluShift announced plans to re-launch the booster to space once its FAA launch license was approved.

As of May 2025, the future of bluShift is uncertain as it has faced challenges in building a cost effective rocket engine and there have been shifts in the government's priorities.{{Clarify}} The company is in the process of raising a $1M seed round.

In February 2026, BluShift shifted focus to servicing the demand for rocket boosters after being awarded the Maine Technology Institute award. The award is funded through the Maine Technology Asset Fund and gave BluShift a $2 million interest-free loan.

== Engine technology ==
The Modular Adaptable Rocket Engine for Vehicle Launch (MAREVL) is a hybrid rocket engine developed by BluShift, which combines solid bio-fuel with liquid oxidizer.

Initially targeting thrust levels between 50 kilonewtons (11,000 lb_{f}) and 60 kilonewtons (13,000 lb_{f}), with plans to reach 80 kilonewtons (18,000 lb_{f}), BluShift's 2022 hot-fire attempt of MAREVL 2.0 was canceled due to ignition failures. The first successful test on March 1, 2022 generated approximately 39 kilonewtons (8,800 lb_{f}) of thrust.

=== Testing programs ===
The full-scale MAREVL 2.0 is currently being tested and is intended to include more than 20 static fire tests. In March 2022, its first test, a 5-second burn, was completed, validating ignition and flow stability. Subsequent tests have progressively extended burn duration and demonstrated throttling capabilities, culminating in the successful 60-second full-duration burn in October 2024.

== Launch vehicles and capabilities ==
Vehicle	Launch sites	Dimensions	Range	Payload	Stages	Launches	Status
Stardust 1	Brunswick, ME; Loring, ME	H: 20 ft (6.1 m); W: 14 in (0.36 m)	1.25 km (4,100 ft)	8 kg (18 lb)	1	1	Retired
Stardust 2	Brunswick, ME; Loring, ME	H: 22 ft (6.7 m); W: 24 in (0.61 m)	15 km (49,000 ft)	30 kg (66 lb)	1	0	Cancelled
Starless Rogue Beta	Washington County, ME; Spaceport America, NM	H: 37 ft (11 m); W: 24 in (0.61 m)	120 km (75 mi)	30 kg (66 lb)	1	0	Cancelled
Starless Rogue	Washington County, ME; Wallops LC-1, VA; Spaceport America, NM	H: 37 ft (11 m); W: 30 in (0.76 m)	300 km (190 mi)	30 kg (66 lb)	1-2	0	Cancelled
Red Dwarf	Washington County, ME; Wallops, VA; Cape Canaveral LC-48, FL	H: 78 ft (24 m); W: 40 in (1.0 m)	~1,000 km (620 mi) LEO/SSO	100 kg (220 lb)	2	0	Cancelled

=== Stardust program ===
The Stardust series served as BluShift's technology demonstrator and testbed for the MAREVL propulsion system. These rockets are launched from a mobile stand approximately three times the height of the rocket, which features flame diverters at its base. A 2022 report from Mainebiz noted that BluShift's fuel production, test site, and launchpad are intended to be entirely solar-powered.

On January 31, 2021, Stardust 1 successfully demonstrated the viability of biofuel propulsion. The single-stage reusable prototype carried an 8 kg (18 lb) payload to an altitude of approximately 4,000 feet (1,200 m). The company characterized the vehicle's post recovery condition as satisfactory for potential reuse. The vehicle is now considered retired.

=== Starless Rogue ===
The Starless Rogue is BluShift's suborbital rocket platform. It is designed to provide 6–10 minutes of microgravity for 30 kg (66 lb) payloads on trajectories reaching up to 300 kilometres (190 mi) altitude. The vehicle also serves as a hypersonic testbed for defense applications.

In 2026, all vehicle rocket development was cancelled due to insufficient funding, with the company pivoting to develop their rocket engine and rocket booster technologies.

=== Red Dwarf ===
Red Dwarf is BluShift's first orbital launch vehicle, designed to deliver 100 kg (220 lb) payloads to low Earth orbit, with a focus on polar and sun-synchronous orbits.

In February 2022, BluShift announced that it had reduced Red Dwarf from three stages to two while more than tripling its payload capacity from 30 to 100 kg (66 to 220 lb).

The first Red Dwarf launch was planned for 2026, pending successful Starless Rogue operations and full FAA licensing. Due to Maine's high latitude, the vehicle was hoped to be optimized for high-inclination and polar orbits; however, the company also considered operations from Wallops LC-1 and Cape Canaveral LC-48 for different orbital requirements.

In 2026, all vehicle rocket development was cancelled due to insufficient funding, with the company pivoting to develop their rocket engine and rocket booster technologies.

=== Recovery and reusability ===
BluShift has integrated recovery systems into all of its vehicles. Stardust 1 successfully demonstrated parachute recovery, landing safely in snow for post-flight analysis rather than reflight.

== Launch attempt history ==
Launch No.	Date/time	Vehicle	Customer/payload	Launch site	Apogee	Duration	Outcome
-	21 October 2020	Stardust	—N/a	Test Launch Stand, Brunswick Landing, Maine	—N/a (4,500 ft planned)	—N/a	Cancelled
-	The company's first planned test launch was postponed due to COVID-19 and other delays.						
1	27 December 2020 07:00 ET	Stardust 1.0	Kellogg Research Lab, Rocket Insights, Falmouth High School	Runway, Loring Commerce Centre, Maine	—N/a (4,000 ft planned)	—N/a	Postponed
1	27 December 2020 07:00 ET	Stardust 1.0	Kellogg Research Lab, Rocket Insights, Falmouth High School	Launch scrubbed due to unfavorable weather conditions.			
1	14 January 2021 07:00 ET	Stardust 1.0	Kellogg Research Lab, Rocket Insights, Falmouth High School	Runway, Loring Commerce Centre, Maine	—N/a (4,000 ft planned)	—N/a	Postponed
1	14 January 2021 07:00 ET	Stardust 1.0	Kellogg Research Lab, Rocket Insights, Falmouth High School	Second attempt scrubbed due to unfavorable weather and winds.			
1	31 January 2021 14:45 ET	Stardust 1.0	Kellogg Research Lab, Rocket Insights, Falmouth High School	Runway, Loring Commerce Centre, Maine	1,250 m (4,100 ft) AGL	~2 minutes	Success
1	Successful launch after the third countdown of the day. First commercial biofuel rocket launch worldwide. Recovery teams retrieved rocket components safely from a snow-covered field.						
2	NET Late 2025	Starless Rogue	TBA	Spaceport America, New Mexico	TBA (120-140 km planned)	(~10 minutes planned)	Cancelled
2	Planned first suborbital launch to space with paying customers, pending FAA commercial launch license approval. Cancelled due to insufficient funding.						
3	NET Mid-2026	Starless Rogue	data-sort-value="" style="background: #DDF; color:black; vertical-align: middle; text-align: center; " class="skin-invert no table-no2" | Coastal Launch Pad, Washington County, Maine	TBA (>150 km planned)	(~10 minutes planned)	Cancelled	
3	Planned first commercial launch from Maine coastal site with Max IQ experiment payloads. Cancelled due to insufficient funding.						
4	NET 2026	Red Dwarf	TBA	Coastal Launch Pad, Washington County, Maine	TBA (LEO/SSO planned)	—N/a	Cancelled
4	Planned first orbital test launch of Red Dwarf vehicle. Cancelled due to insufficient funding.						

== See also ==
Similar companies:

- Rocket Lab
- Firefly Aerospace
- Relativity Space
- Orbex
- Exos Aerospace
- Maritime Launch Services
- Astra Space

Related articles:

- List of rocket launch sites
- List of orbital launch systems
- List of private spaceflight companies
- Hybrid rocket
- Small satellite
