= Kookaburra (rocket) =

Australian rocket

Kookaburra is an Australian sounding rocket used for atmospheric research. It was designed to be relatively inexpensive It took part in an international experiment in March 1970 with Britain and India to measure ozone levels and atmospheric temperature. The Kookaburra was launched 33 times in total before being retired in 1976.

== Technical data ==
- Apogee: 75 km
- Total Mass: 100 kg
- Core Diameter: 0.12 m
- Total Length: 3.40 m
