= Comparison of orbital launch systems =

Comparison of all orbital launch systems

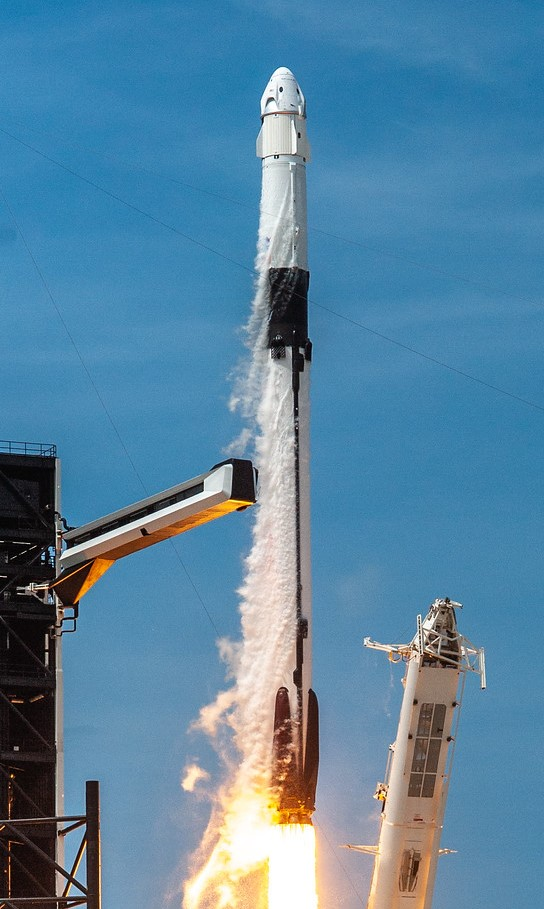
Falcon 9 Block 5, the most prolific active orbital launch system in the world.

This comparison of orbital launch systems lists the attributes of all current and future individual rocket configurations designed to reach orbit. A first list contains rockets that are operational or have attempted an orbital flight attempt as of 2026; a second list includes all upcoming rockets. For the simple list of all conventional launcher families, see: Comparison of orbital launchers families. For the list of predominantly solid-fueled orbital launch systems, see: Comparison of solid-fueled orbital launch systems.

== Background ==
Spacecraft propulsion (Note: There are many different methods. Each method has drawbacks and advantages, and spacecraft propulsion is an active area of research. However, most spacecraft today are propelled by forcing a gas from the back/rear of the vehicle at very high speed through a supersonic de Laval nozzle. This sort of engine is called a rocket engine.) is any method used to accelerate spacecraft and artificial satellites. Orbital launch systems are rockets and other systems capable of placing payloads into or beyond Earth orbit. All launch vehicle propulsion systems employed to date have been chemical rockets falling into one of three main categories:

- Solid-propellant rockets or solid-fuel rockets have a motor that uses solid propellants, typically a mix of powdered fuel and oxidizer held together by a polymer binder and molded into the shape of a hollow cylinder. The cylinder is ignited from the inside and burns radially outward, with the resulting expanding gases and aerosols escaping out via the nozzle. (Note: The first medieval rockets were solid-fuel rockets powered by gunpowder; they were used by the Chinese, Indians, Mongols and Arabs, in warfare as early as the 13th century.)
- Liquid-propellant rockets have a motor that feeds liquid propellant(s) into a combustion chamber. Most liquid engines use a bipropellant, consisting of two liquid propellants (fuel and oxidizer) which are stored and handled separately before being mixed and burned inside the combustion chamber.
- Hybrid-propellant rockets use a combination of solid and liquid propellant, typically involving a liquid oxidizer being pumped through a hollow cylinder of solid fuel.

All current spacecraft use conventional chemical rockets (solid-fuel or liquid bipropellant) for launch, though some (Note: Such as the Pegasus rocket and SpaceShipOne.) have used air-breathing engines on their first stage. (Note: Most satellites have simple reliable chemical thrusters (often monopropellant rockets) or resistojet rockets for orbital station-keeping and some use momentum wheels for attitude control. Soviet bloc satellites have used electric propulsion for decades, and newer Western geo-orbiting spacecraft are starting to use them for north–south stationkeeping and orbit raising. Interplanetary vehicles mostly use chemical rockets as well, although a few have used ion thrusters and Hall effect thrusters (two different types of electric propulsion) to great success.)

== Current rockets ==
Orbits legend

- LEO, low Earth orbit
- SSO or SSPO, near-polar Sun-synchronous orbit
- Polar, polar orbit
- MEO, medium Earth orbit
- GTO, geostationary transfer orbit
- GEO, geostationary orbit (direct injection)
- HEO, high Earth orbit
- HCO, heliocentric orbit
- TLI, trans-lunar injection
- TMI, trans-Mars injection

Vehicle	Origin	Manufacturer	Height	Maximum payload mass (kg)			Reusable/ Expendable	Orbital launches including failures (Note: Suborbital flight tests and on-pad explosions are excluded, but launches failing en route to orbit are included.)	Launch site(s)	Dates of flight	
Vehicle	Origin	Manufacturer	Height	LEO	GTO	Other	Reusable/ Expendable	Orbital launches including failures	Launch site(s)	First	Latest
Angara A5 / Briz-M	Russia	Khrunichev	55.4 m	N/A	5,400	2,800 to GEO	Expendable	3	(Russia) Plesetsk, (Russia) Vostochny	2014	2025
Angara-1.2	Russia	Khrunichev	42.2 m	3,800 (200 km)	N/A	2,400 to SSO	Expendable	7	(Russia) Plesetsk, (Russia) Vostochny	2022	2026
Ariane 6 A62	Europe	ArianeGroup	63 m	10,300	4,500	7,200 to SSO; 7,000 to polar 3,300 to HEO; 2,600 to HCO; 3,500 to TLI	Expendable	6	(France) CSG	2024	2026
Ariane 6 A64	Europe	ArianeGroup	63 m	21,600	11,500	15,500 to SSO; 15,400 to polar 5,000 to GEO; 8,000 to HEO; 6,900 to HCO; 8,600 to TLI	Expendable	2	(France) CSG	2026	2026
Ariane 6 A64 (Block 2)	Europe	ArianeGroup	63 m	23,650	N/A	N/A	Expendable	1	(France) CSG	2026	2026
Atlas V N22 (Note: for Starliner)	United States	ULA	52.4 m	13,250 (to ISS)	N/A	N/A	Expendable	3	(United States) CCSFS	2019	2024
Ceres-1 (3) (Note: Despite not being officially acknowledged by the manufacturer, significant changes between different iterations of the rocket lead to the identification of different variants.)	China	Galactic Energy	20 m	420	N/A	300 to SSO	Expendable	15	(China) JSLC	2022	2025
Ceres-1S (Note: Sea-launched version of the third unofficial iteration of the Ceres-1 launch vehicle.)	China	Galactic Energy	20 m	420	N/A	300 to SSO	Expendable	7	(China) OMSP	2023	2026
Ceres-2	China	Galactic Energy	30 m	1,600 (500 km)	N/A	1,300 to SSO (500 km)	Expendable	2	(China) JSLC	2026	2026
Chollima-1	North Korea	NADA	36.2 m	N/A	N/A	N/A	Expendable	3	(North Korea) Sohae	2023	2023
Electron	United States; New Zealand	Rocket Lab	18 m	300	N/A	200 to SSO	Expendable	92 (Note: Additionally, 8 suborbital missions have been conducted using the vehicle's HASTE configuration.) (Note: Includes one orbital HASTE mission.)	(New Zealand) Mahia, (United States) MARS	2017	2026
Falcon 9 Block 5	United States	SpaceX	70 m	13,000	3,500	N/A	Partially reusable (launch site)	647	(United States) VSFB, (United States) CCSFS, (United States) KSC	2018	2026
Falcon 9 Block 5	United States	SpaceX	70 m	~ 18,500	5,500	4,500 to MEO	Partially reusable (drone ship)	647	(United States) VSFB, (United States) CCSFS, (United States) KSC	2018	2026
Falcon 9 Block 5	United States	SpaceX	70 m	22,800	8,300	4,020 to TMI	Expendable	647	(United States) VSFB, (United States) CCSFS, (United States) KSC	2018	2026
Falcon Heavy	United States	SpaceX	70 m	30,000	8,000	N/A	Partially reusable (Note: Either 2 or 3 boosters recoverable.)	14	(United States) KSC	2018	2026
Falcon Heavy	United States	SpaceX	70 m	63,800	26,700	16,800 to TMI	Expendable	14	(United States) KSC	2018	2026
Gravity-1	China	Orienspace	30 m	6,500	N/A	4,200 to SSO (500 km)	Expendable	4	(China) OMSP	2024	2026
GSLV Mk II	India	ISRO	51.7 m	6,000	2,250	N/A	Expendable	14	(India) SDSC	2010	2026
H3-22S	Japan	Mitsubishi	57 m	N/A	4,000	N/A	Expendable	7	(Japan) TNSC	2023	2026
H3-24L/W	Japan	Mitsubishi	63 m	16,000	6,500	N/A	Expendable	2	(Japan) TNSC	2025	2026
H3-30S	Japan	Mitsubishi	57 m	N/A	2,100	4,000 to SSO (500 km)	Expendable	1	(Japan) TNSC	2026	2026
Hyperbola-1 (2) (Note: Despite not being officially acknowledged by the manufacturer, significant changes between different iterations of the rocket lead to the identification of different variants.)	China	i-Space	24 m	520	N/A	300 to SSO (500 km)	Expendable	7	(China) JSLC	2021	2025
Jielong 3	China	CALT	31 m	N/A	N/A	1,600 to SSO (500 km)	Expendable	12	(China) OMSP	2022	2026
Kinetica 1	China	CAS Space	30 m	2,000	N/A	1,500 to SSO (500 km)	Expendable	16	(China) JSLC, (China) OMSP	2022	2026
Kinetica 2	China	CAS Space	53 m	12,000	N/A	8,000 to SSO (500 km)	Partially reusable	2	(China) JSLC	2026	2026
Kuaizhou 1A	China	ExPace	19.8 m	300	N/A	200 to SSO (700 km)	Expendable	27	(China) JSLC, (China) TSLC, (China) XSLC	2013	2024
Kuaizhou 1A Pro	China	ExPace	19.8 m	450	N/A	360 to SSO (500 km)	Expendable	4	(China) JSLC, (China) TSLC, (China) XSLC	2024	2025
Kuaizhou 11	China	ExPace	25 m	1,500	N/A	1,000 to SSO	Expendable	7	(China) JSLC	2020	2026
Long March 2C	China	CALT	42 m	3,850 (200 km)	1,250	1,400 to SSO (600 km)	Expendable	79	(China) JSLC, (China) TSLC, (China) XSLC	1982	2026
Long March 2C / YZ-1S	China	CALT	42 m	N/A	N/A	2,000 to SSO	Expendable	10	(China) JSLC, (China) XSLC	2018	2026
Long March 2D	China	SAST	41.1 m	3,500	N/A	1,300 to SSO	Expendable	102	(China) JSLC, (China) TSLC, (China) XSLC	1992	2026
Long March 2D / YZ-3	China	SAST	41.1 m	N/A	N/A	N/A	Expendable	4	(China) JSLC, (China) XSLC	2018	2024
Long March 2F/G	China	CALT	62 m	8,400	N/A	N/A	Expendable	16	(China) JSLC	2011	2026
Long March 2F/T	China	CALT	58.3 m	8,600	N/A	N/A	Expendable	6	(China) JSLC	2011	2026
Long March 3A	China	CALT	52.5 m	6,000	2,600	5,000 to SSO; 1,420 to HCO	Expendable	27	(China) XSLC	1994	2018
Long March 3B/E	China	CALT	56.3 m	11,500	5,500	7,100 to SSO; 2,000 to GEO; 3,500 to HCO	Expendable	90	(China) XSLC	2007	2026
Long March 3B/E / YZ-1	China	CALT	56.3 m	N/A	N/A	N/A	Expendable	15	(China) XSLC	2015	2024
Long March 3C/E	China	CALT	55.6 m	8,000	3,900	N/A	Expendable	7	(China) XSLC	2014	2025
Long March 3C / YZ-1	China	CALT	54.8 m	N/A	N/A	N/A	Expendable	3	(China) XSLC	2015	2025
Long March 4B	China	SAST	44.1 m	4,200	1,500	2,800 to SSO	Expendable	59	(China) JSLC, (China) TSLC, (China) XSLC	1999	2026
Long March 4C	China	SAST	45.8 m	4,200	1,500	2,800 to SSO	Expendable	59	(China) JSLC, (China) TSLC, (China) XSLC	2006	2026
Long March 5	China	CALT	63.2 m	N/A	14,000	15,000 to SSO (700 km); 13,000 to MEO; 5,100 to GEO; 9,400 to TLI; 6,000 to TMI	Expendable	10	(China) WSLS	2017	2026
Long March 5 / YZ-2	China	CALT	57 m	N/A	N/A	4,500 to GEO	Expendable	1	(China) WSLS	2016	2016
Long March 5B	China	CALT	53.7 m	25,000	N/A	15,000 to SSO	Expendable	4	(China) WSLS	2020	2022
Long March 5B / YZ-2	China	CALT	53.7 m	N/A	N/A	N/A	Expendable	3	(China) WSLS	2024	2025
Long March 6	China	SAST	29 m	1,500	N/A	1,080 to SSO	Expendable	15	(China) TSLC	2015	2026
Long March 6A	China	SAST	52 m	8,000	N/A	6,500 to SSO	Expendable	28	(China) TSLC	2022	2026
Long March 6C	China	SAST	43 m	4,500	N/A	2,400 to SSO (500 km)	Expendable	2	(China) TSLC	2024	2026
Long March 7	China	CALT	53.1 m	13,500	N/A	N/A	Expendable	10	(China) WSLS	2017	2026
Long March 7 / YZ-1A	China	CALT	53.1 m	N/A	N/A	N/A	Expendable	1	(China) WSLS	2016	2016
Long March 7A	China	CALT	60.1 m	N/A	7,000	5,500 to SSO (700 km) >8,000 to MEO; 5,000 to TLI	Expendable	18	(China) WSLS	2020	2026
Long March 8	China	CALT	50.3 m	8,100	2,800	5,000 to SSO (700 km); 1,500 to TLI	Expendable	6	(China) WSLS, (China) WCSLS	2020	2026
Long March 8 (Core Alone)	China	CALT	48 m	3,000	1,400	N/A	Expendable	1	(China) WSLS, (China) WCSLS	2022	2022
Long March 8A	China	CALT	50.5 m	> 10,000	3,500	7,000 to SSO (700 km)	Expendable	12	(China) WSLS, (China) WCSLS	2025	2026
Long March 10B	China	CALT	70.2 m	16,000 (200km)	N/A	N/A	Partially reusable	1	(China) WSLS, (China) WCSLS	2026	2026
Long March 11	China	CALT	20.8 m	700	N/A	350 to SSO (700 km)	Expendable	12	(China) JSLC, (China) XSLC	2015	2023
Long March 11H	China	CALT	20.8 m	700	N/A	350 to SSO (700 km)	Expendable	6	(China) OMSP	2019	2025
Long March 12	China	SAST	59 m	12,000	N/A	6,000 to SSO (700 km)	Expendable	10	(China) WCSLS	2024	2026
Long March 12A	China	SAST	70.4 m	6,000 (200 km)	N/A	3,000 to SSO (500 km)	Partially reusable	1	(China) JSLC	2025	2025
Long March 12A	China	SAST	70.4 m	9,000 (200 km)	N/A	N/A	Expendable	1	(China) JSLC	2025	2025
Long March 12B	China	CASC	72 m	12,000	N/A	N/A	Partially reusable	1	(China) JSLC	2026	2026
Long March 12B	China	CASC	72 m	20,000	N/A	15,000 to SSO (500 km)	Expendable	1	(China) JSLC	2026	2026
LVM 3	India	ISRO	43.5 m	8,000	4,000	N/A	Expendable	8	(India) SDSC	2017 (Note: A suborbital test flight was conducted in 2014 (designated LVM-3/CARE) without the cryogenic upper stage (CUS).)	2025
Minotaur I	United States	Northrop Grumman	19.2 m	584 (200 km)	N/A	~ 435 to SSO (200 km); ~ 450 to Polar (200 km)	Expendable	12 (Note: A suborbital mission was conducted in 2024.)	(United States) MARS, (United States) VSFB	2000	2021
Minotaur IV	United States	Northrop Grumman	23.9 m	1,591 (200 km)	N/A	~ 1,160 to SSO (200 km); ~ 1,210 to Polar (200 km)	Expendable	4 (Note: Additionally, two suborbital missions were conducted in 2010 and 2011.)	(United States) CCSFS, (United States) MARS, (United States) PSCA, (United States) VSFB	2010	2026
Minotaur IV / HAPS	United States	Northrop Grumman	23.9 m	N/A	N/A	N/A	Expendable	1	(United States) CCSFS, (United States) MARS, (United States) PSCA, (United States) VSFB	2010	2010
Minotaur IV / Orion 38	United States	Northrop Grumman	23.9 m	N/A	N/A	N/A	Expendable	1	(United States) CCSFS, (United States) MARS, (United States) PSCA, (United States) VSFB	2017	2017
Minotaur IV+	United States	Northrop Grumman	23.9 m	1,837 (200 km)	N/A	~ 1,380 to SSO (200 km); ~ 1,420 to Polar (200 km)	Expendable	1	(United States) CCSFS, (United States) MARS, (United States) PSCA, (United States) VSFB	2011	2011
Minotaur V	United States	Northrop Grumman	24.6 m	N/A	532	650 to MEO; 342 to TLI	Expendable	1	(United States) CCSFS, (United States) MARS, (United States) PSCA, (United States) VSFB	2013	2013
New Glenn 7x2	United States	Blue Origin	98 m	45,000	13,000	N/A	Partially reusable	3	(United States) CCSFS	2025	2026
Nuri (KSLV-II)	South Korea	KARI	47.2 m	3,300	N/A	1,900 to SSO	Expendable	5	(South Korea) Naro	2021	2026
Proton-M	Russia	Khrunichev	58.2 m	22,000	N/A	N/A	Expendable	1	(Kazakhstan) Baikonur	2021	2021
Proton-M / Briz-M	Russia	Khrunichev	58.2 m	N/A	6,350	3,590 to GEO	Expendable	101	(Kazakhstan) Baikonur	2001	2023
PSLV-CA	India	ISRO	44 m	2,100	N/A	1,100 to SSO	Expendable	18	(India) SDSC	2007	2024
PSLV-DL	India	ISRO	44 m	N/A	N/A	1,257 to SSO	Expendable	5	(India) SDSC	2019	2026
PSLV-QL	India	ISRO	44 m	N/A	N/A	1,523 to SSO	Expendable	2	(India) SDSC	2019	2019
PSLV-XL	India	ISRO	44 m	3,800	1,300	1,750 to SSO	Expendable	27	(India) SDSC	2008	2025
Qaem 100	Iran	IRGC	15.5 m	80 (500 km)	N/A	N/A	Expendable	3 (Note: A suborbital test flight succeeded in 2022.)	(Iran) Shahrud	2023	2024
Qased	Iran	IRGC	18.8 m	40 (500 km)	N/A	N/A	Expendable	3	(Iran) Shahrud	2020	2023
Shavit-2	Israel	IAI	26.4 m	350 in Retrograde	N/A	N/A	Expendable	7	(Israel) Palmachim	2007	2025
Simorgh	Iran	Iranian Space Agency	25.9 m	350	N/A	N/A	Expendable	8 (Note: A suborbital test flight succeeded in 2016.)	(Iran) Semnan	2017	2025
SLS Block 1	United States	NASA; Boeing; Northrop Grumman; ULA	98.3 m	95,000	N/A	27,000+ to TLI	Expendable	2	(United States) KSC	2022	2026
Soyuz-2.1a	Russia	RKTs Progress	46.3 m	7,460 (200 km)	N/A	6,130 to SSO (200 km)	Expendable	58 (Note: Suborbital test flight in 2004, without Fregat upper stage.)	(Kazakhstan) Baikonur, (Russia) Plesetsk	2013	2026
Soyuz-2.1a / Fregat	Russia	RKTs Progress	46.3 m	N/A	N/A	4,450 to SSO	Expendable	23	(Kazakhstan) Baikonur, (Russia) Plesetsk, (Russia) Vostochny	2006	2026
Soyuz-2.1a / Volga	Russia	RKTs Progress	46.3 m	N/A	N/A	N/A	Expendable	1	(Kazakhstan) Baikonur, (Russia) Plesetsk, (Russia) Vostochny	2016	2016
Soyuz-2.1b	Russia	RKTs Progress	46.3 m	8,670 (200 km)	N/A	7,270 to SSO (200 km)	Expendable	23	(Kazakhstan) Baikonur, (Russia) Plesetsk	2008	2026
Soyuz-2.1b / Fregat	Russia	RKTs Progress	46.3 m	5,500	3,060	4,900 to SSO; 1,200 to HCO	Expendable	65	(Kazakhstan) Baikonur, (Russia) Plesetsk, (Russia) Vostochny	2006	2026
Soyuz-2.1b / Volga	Russia	RKTs Progress	46.3 m	N/A	N/A	N/A	Expendable	1	(Kazakhstan) Baikonur, (Russia) Plesetsk, (Russia) Vostochny	2026	2026
Spectrum	Germany	Isar Aerospace	28 m	1,000	N/A	700 to SSO	Expendable	2	(Norway) Andøya	2025	2026
SSLV	India	ISRO	34 m	500 (500 km)	N/A	300 to SSO	Expendable	3	(India) SDSC	2022	2024
Starship Block 3	United States	SpaceX	124.4 m	100,000	N/A	N/A	Fully reusable	2	(United States) Starbase	2026	2026
Tianlong-2	China	Space Pioneer	32.8 m	2,000	N/A	1,500 to SSO (500 km)	Expendable	1	(China) JSLC	2023	2023
Vega-C	Italy	Avio	34.8 m	3,300	N/A	2,300 to SSO; 2,500 to polar	Expendable	8	(France) CSG	2022	2026
Vulcan Centaur VC2	United States	ULA	61.6 m	19,000 (200 km)	8,400	15,200 to polar (200 km); 3,900 to MEO; 2,600 to GEO; 6,300 to TLI	Expendable	2	(United States) CCSFS	2024	2024
Vulcan Centaur VC4	United States	ULA	61.6 m	24,600 (200 km)	11,700	20,000 to polar (200 km); 6,200 to MEO; 4,900 to GEO; 9,200 to TLI	Expendable	2	(United States) CCSFS	2025	2026
Vulcan Centaur VC6	United States	ULA	61.6 m	27,200 (200 km)	14,500	23,900 to polar (200 km); 8,100 to MEO; 6,500 to GEO; 11,500 to TLI	Expendable	1	(United States) CCSFS	2026	2026
Zhuque-2E (Block 2)	China	LandSpace	55.9 m	6,000 (200 km)	N/A	4,000 to SSO (500 km)	Expendable	4	(China) JSLC	2026	2026
Zhuque-3	China	LandSpace	65.9 m	8,000	N/A	N/A	Partially reusable	2	(China) JSLC	2025	2026
Zhuque-3	China	LandSpace	65.9 m	11,800	N/A	N/A	Expendable	2	(China) JSLC	2025	2026

== Rockets in flight testing ==
Vehicle	Origin	Manufacturer	Height	Maximum payload mass (kg)			Reusable / Expendable	Orbital launches including failures (Note: Suborbital flight tests and on-pad explosions are excluded, but launches failing en route to orbit are included.)	Suborbital test flights	Launch site(s)	Dates of flight	
Vehicle	Origin	Manufacturer	Height	LEO	GTO	Other	Reusable / Expendable	Orbital launches including failures	Suborbital test flights	Launch site(s)	First	Latest
Angara A5 / Orion	Russia	Khrunichev	54.9 m	N/A	6,500	3,700 to GEO	Expendable	1		(Russia) Plesetsk, (Russia) Vostochny	2024	2024
Angara A5 / Persei	Russia	Khrunichev	54.9 m	N/A	6,500	3,700 to GEO	Expendable	1		(Russia) Plesetsk, (Russia) Vostochny	2021	2021
Eris Block 1	Australia	Gilmour Space Technologies	25 m	305	N/A	215 to SSO	Expendable	1		(Australia) Bowen	2025	2025
HANBIT-NANO HyPER	South Korea	Innospace	21.7 m	N/A	N/A	90 to SSO	Expendable	1		(Brazil) CEA, (Norway) Andøya, (Australia) ASC	2025	2025
KAIROS	Japan	Space One	18 m	250	N/A	150 to SSO	Expendable	3		(Japan) Spaceport Kii	2024	2026
Long March 10A	China	CALT	67.4 m	14,000	N/A	N/A	Partially reusable		1	(China) WSLS	2026	2026
Long March 10A	China	CALT	67.4 m	18,000	N/A	N/A	Expendable		1	(China) WSLS	2026	2026
Mir TV2	South Korea	MND	19.5 m	100	N/A	N/A	Expendable	1		(South Korea) Jeju sea launch platform	2023	2023
New-type satellite carrier rocket	North Korea; Russia	NADA Khrunichev	N/A	N/A	N/A	N/A	Expendable	1		(North Korea) Sohae	2024	2024
Pallas-1	China	Galactic Energy	42 m	7,000	N/A	N/A	Partially reusable	1		(China) JSLC	2026	2026
Soyuz-5 (Irtysh)	Russia	TsSKB-Progress; RSC Energia	61.87 m	18,000	N/A	2,500 to GEO	Expendable		1	(Kazakhstan) Baikonur	2026	2026
Tianlong-3	China	Space Pioneer	72 m	17,000	N/A	14,000 to SSO	Partially reusable	1		(China) JSLC, (China) WSLS	2026	2026
Vikram-I	India	Skyroot Aerospace	24 m	350 to 45º inclination 500 km LEO	N/A	260 to 500 km SSO	Expendable	1		(India) SDSC, (India) SLC	2026	2026
Zuljanah	Iran	Iranian Space Agency	25.5 m	220	N/A	N/A	Expendable	1	2	(Iran) Semnan	2025	2025

== Upcoming rockets ==
Upcoming launch vehicles

Vehicle	Origin	Manufacturer	Height	Payload mass to ... (kg)			Reusable / Expendable	Launch Site (s)	Date of first flight
Vehicle	Origin	Manufacturer	Height	LEO	GTO	Other	Reusable / Expendable	Launch Site (s)	Date of first flight
Agnibaan	India	AgniKul Cosmos	18 m	100	N/A	N/A	Expendable	(India) SDSC	2026
Angara A5 / KVTK	Russia	Khrunichev	N/A	N/A	7,500	4,500 to GEO	Expendable	(Russia) Plesetsk, (Russia) Vostochny	2028
Angara A5M	Russia	Khrunichev	N/A	26,800	4,100-5,200	N/A	Expendable	(Russia) Plesetsk, (Russia) Vostochny	2027
Angara A5P	Russia	Khrunichev	N/A	18,200	N/A	N/A	Expendable	(Russia) Vostochny	2028
Angara A5V	Russia	Khrunichev	70 m	37,500	13,300	8,000 to GEO; ~15,000 to HEO; ~10000 to TLI	Expendable	(Russia) Vostochny	2028
Antares 330	United States	Northrop Grumman Firefly Aerospace (Note: provides the first stage, including engines)	47 m	10,500	N/A	N/A	Expendable	(United States) MARS	2026
Aurora	Canada	Reaction Dynamics	18 m	200	N/A	N/A	Expendable	(Canada) Nova Scotia	N/A
Aventura 1	Argentina	TLON Space	10 m	N/A	N/A	25 kg to SSO	Expendable	(Argentina) Puerto Espacial Malacara	2026
Blue Whale 1	South Korea	Perigee Aerospace	21 m	165	N/A	185 to SSO	Partially reusable	(South Korea) CETACEA 1 sea launch platform (Sweden) Esrange	2026
Blue Whale 1	South Korea	Perigee Aerospace	21 m	190	N/A	220 to SSO	Expendable	(South Korea) CETACEA 1 sea launch platform (Sweden) Esrange	2026
Cosmos	Russia	SR space	18.5 m	390	N/A	310 to SSO	N/A	(Russia) Vostochny, (Russia) Yasny	N/A
Cyclone-4M	Ukraine	Yuzhnoye; Yuzhmash	38.9 m	5,000	910	3,350 to SSO	Expendable	(Canada) Nova Scotia	N/A
Dauntless	United States	Vaya Space	18.3 m	> 500	N/A	> 300 to SSO	Expendable	(United States) CCSFS, (United States) The Spaceport Company Launch Platform	2026
Daytona	United States	Phantom Space	20.3 m	> 600	N/A	N/A	Expendable	(United States) VSFB, (United States) CCSFS, (Australia) ASC	2026
Eclipse	United States	Firefly Aerospace	59 m	16,300	3,200	2,300 to TLI	Partially reusable	(United States) MARS, (United States) CCSFS, (United States) VSFB	2027
Epsilon S	Japan	JAXA	27.2 m	1,400	N/A	600 to SSO	Expendable	(Japan) KSC	2026
Gravity-2	China	Orienspace	70 m	21,500	N/A	15,000 to SSO	Partially reusable	(China) WSLS	2026
Gravity-3	China	Orienspace	81 m	100,000	N/A	74,000 to SSO	Fully reusable	(China) WSLS	N/A
HANBIT-NANO LiMER	South Korea	Innospace	21.8 m	N/A	N/A	90 to SSO	Expendable	(Brazil) CEA, (Norway) Andøya, (Australia) ASC	N/A
Hyperbola-3	China	i-Space	69 m	8,500	N/A	N/A	Partially reusable	(China) JSLC	2026
Hyperbola-3	China	i-Space	69 m	13,000	N/A	N/A	Expendable	(China) JSLC	2026
H3-22L	Japan	Mitsubishi	63 m	N/A	4,000	N/A	Expendable	(Japan) TNSC	N/A
Jielong 4	China	CALT	N/A	N/A	N/A	N/A	Expendable	N/A	N/A
KSLV-III	South Korea	KARI	54 m	10,000	3,500	7,000 to SSO 1,800 to TLI	Expendable	(South Korea) Naro	2030
Long March 9	China	CALT	114 m	150,000	N/A	50,000 to TLI	Partially/fully reusable	(China) WSLS	2033
Long March 10	China	CALT	89 (Note: Height for uncrewed version)–93.2 m (Note: Height for crewed version)	N/A	N/A	27,000 to TLI	Expendable	(China) WSLS	2027
Maia	France	MaiaSpace	50 m	N/A	N/A	500 to SSO	Partially reusable	(France) CSG	2026
Maia	France	MaiaSpace	50 m	N/A	N/A	1,500 to SSO	Expendable	(France) CSG	2026
Miura 5	Spain	PLD Space	35.7 m	1,080	N/A	540 to SSO	Partially reusable	(France) CSG	2026
Nebula-1	China	Deep Blue Aerospace	21 m	2,000	N/A	N/A	Partially reusable	(China) WSLS	2026
Nebula-2	China	Deep Blue Aerospace	N/A	25,000	N/A	N/A	Partially reusable	(China) WSLS	N/A
Neutron	United States; New Zealand	Rocket Lab	42.8 m	8,500	N/A	6,000 to SSO; 6,200 to polar	Partially reusable (launch site)	(United States) MARS	2026
Neutron	United States; New Zealand	Rocket Lab	42.8 m	13,000	1,800	9,700 to SSO; 10,100 to polar	Partially reusable (drone ship)	(United States) MARS	2026
Neutron	United States; New Zealand	Rocket Lab	42.8 m	15,000	2,800	11,500 to SSO; 11,800 to polar	Expendable	(United States) MARS	2026
New Glenn 9x4	United States	Blue Origin	120 m	> 70,000	N/A	14,000 to GEO; 20,000 to TLI	Partially reusable	N/A	N/A
NGLV	India	ISRO	93 m	23,000	9,600	N/A	Partially reusable	(India) SDSC	2031
NGLV-H	India	ISRO	93 m	31,700	12,400	N/A	Partially reusable	(India) SDSC	N/A
Nova	United States	Stoke Space	40.2 m	3,000	N/A	N/A	Fully reusable	(United States) CCSFS	2026
Nova	United States	Stoke Space	40.2 m	7,000	2,500	800 to HCO 1,250 to TLI	Expendable	(United States) CCSFS	2026
RFA One	Germany	RFA	30 m	1,600	450	1,300 to SSO	Expendable	(United Kingdom) SaxaVord, (Norway) Andøya, (France) CSG, (Australia) Whalers Way	2026
Rokot-M	Russia	Khrunichev	N/A	1,950	N/A	N/A	Expendable	(Russia) Plesetsk	2026
ŞİMŞEK-1	Turkey	Roketsan	N/A	400	N/A	N/A	Expendable	(Turkey) İğneada	2027
Siraya	Taiwan	TASA	25 m	200	N/A	N/A	Expendable	N/A	N/A
Sirius 1	France	Sirius Space	24.7 m	N/A	N/A	175 to SSO	Expendable	N/A	2027
Skyrora XL	United Kingdom	Skyrora	22.7 m	315	N/A	315 to SSO	Expendable	(United Kingdom) SaxaVord, (Canada) Nova Scotia	2026
GYUB	South Korea	MND	26.8 m	500	N/A	N/A	Expendable	(South Korea) Jeju sea launch platform	N/A
SL1	Germany	HyImpulse	30 m	500	N/A	N/A	Expendable	(United Kingdom) SaxaVord, (France) CSG, (Australia) Whalers Way	2027
Soyuz-7 (Amur)	Russia	JSC SRC Progress	55 m	10,500	2,600	4,700 to SSO	Partially reusable	(Russia) Vostochny	2028
Soyuz-7 (Amur)	Russia	JSC SRC Progress	55 m	13,600	2,600	4,700 to SSO	Expendable	(Russia) Vostochny	2028
Terran R	United States	Relativity Space	82 m	23,500	5,500	N/A	Partially reusable	(United States) CCSFS	2026
Terran R	United States	Relativity Space	82 m	33,500	5,500	N/A	Expendable	(United States) CCSFS	2026
Tronador II-250	Argentina	VENG	27 m	500-750	N/A	N/A	Expendable	(Argentina) BNPB	2030
Vega-E	Italy	ESA ASI	36.2 m	3,000	N/A	N/A	Expendable	(France) CSG	2026
Vikram-II	India	Skyroot Aerospace	N/A	900 to 45º inclination 500 km LEO	N/A	600 to 500 km SSPO	Expendable	(India) SDSC, (India) SLC	N/A
Volans V500	Singapore	Equatorial Space Systems	N/A	150	N/A	N/A	Expendable	N/A	2026
Vulcan Centaur VC0	United States	ULA	61.6 m	10,800	3,500	2,300 to TLI	Expendable	(United States) VSFB, (United States) CCSFS	N/A
Zephyr	France	Latitude	19 m	100	N/A	80 to SSO	Expendable	(United Kingdom) SaxaVord	2026
Zero	Japan	Interstellar Technologies	32 m	800	N/A	250 to SSO	Expendable	(Japan) Taiki	2027

== Retired rockets ==
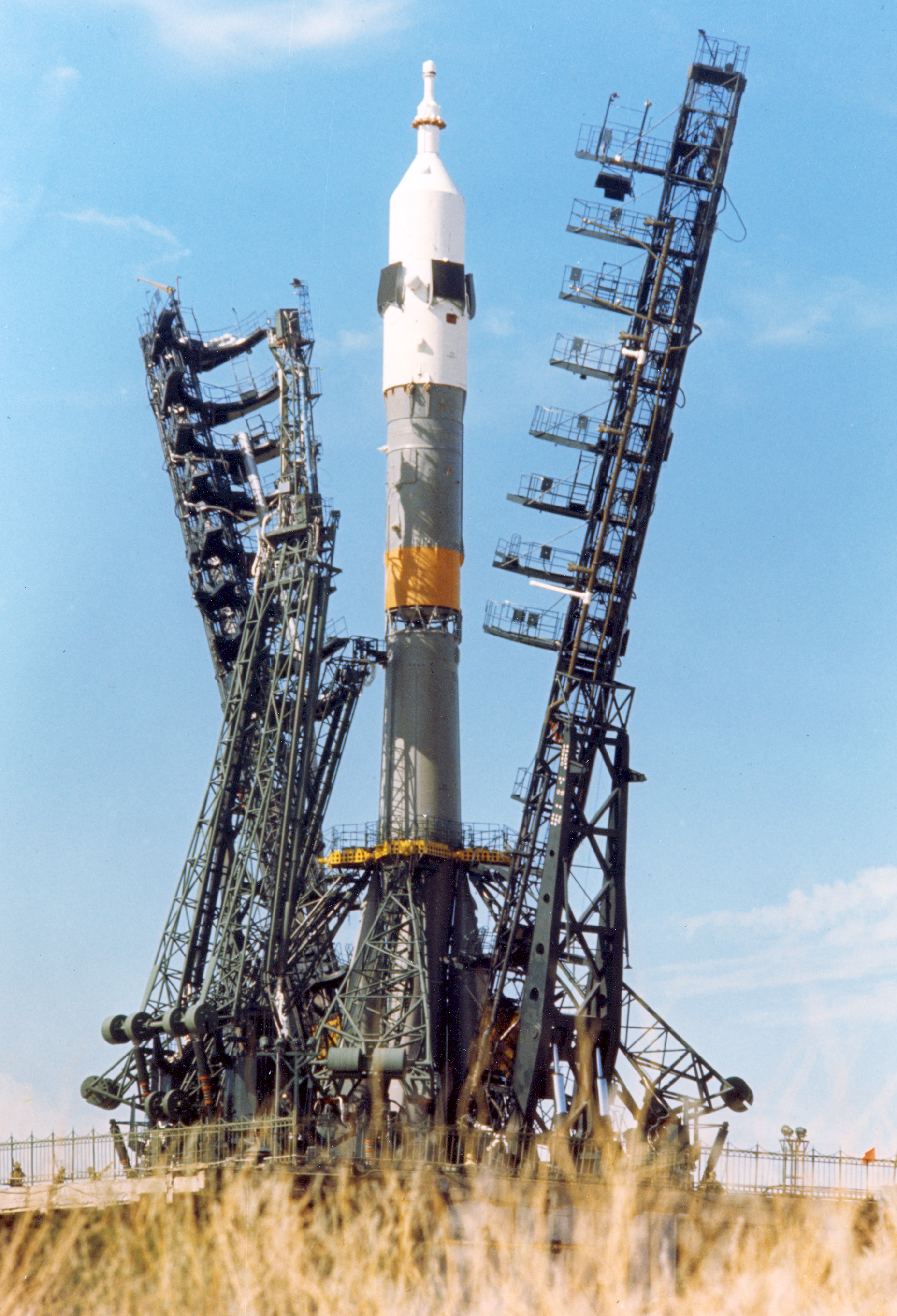
Retired Soyuz-U, the most launched launch system in history, of the groundbreaking and still heavily used R-7 family.

== Launch systems by country ==
The following chart shows the number of launch systems developed in each country, and broken down by operational status. Rocket variants are not distinguished; i.e., the Atlas V series is only counted once for all its configurations 401–431, 501–551, 552, and N22.

- Operational
- In development
- Retired

== See also ==
- Comparison of orbital launchers families
- Comparison of orbital rocket engines
- Comparison of crewed space vehicles
- Comparison of retired orbital launch vehicles
- Comparison of space station cargo vehicles
- List of space launch system designs
- Reusable launch system
- List of orbital launch systems
- Lists of rockets
- List of sounding rockets
- List of upper stages
- Non-rocket spacelaunch
