= 2024 in spaceflight =

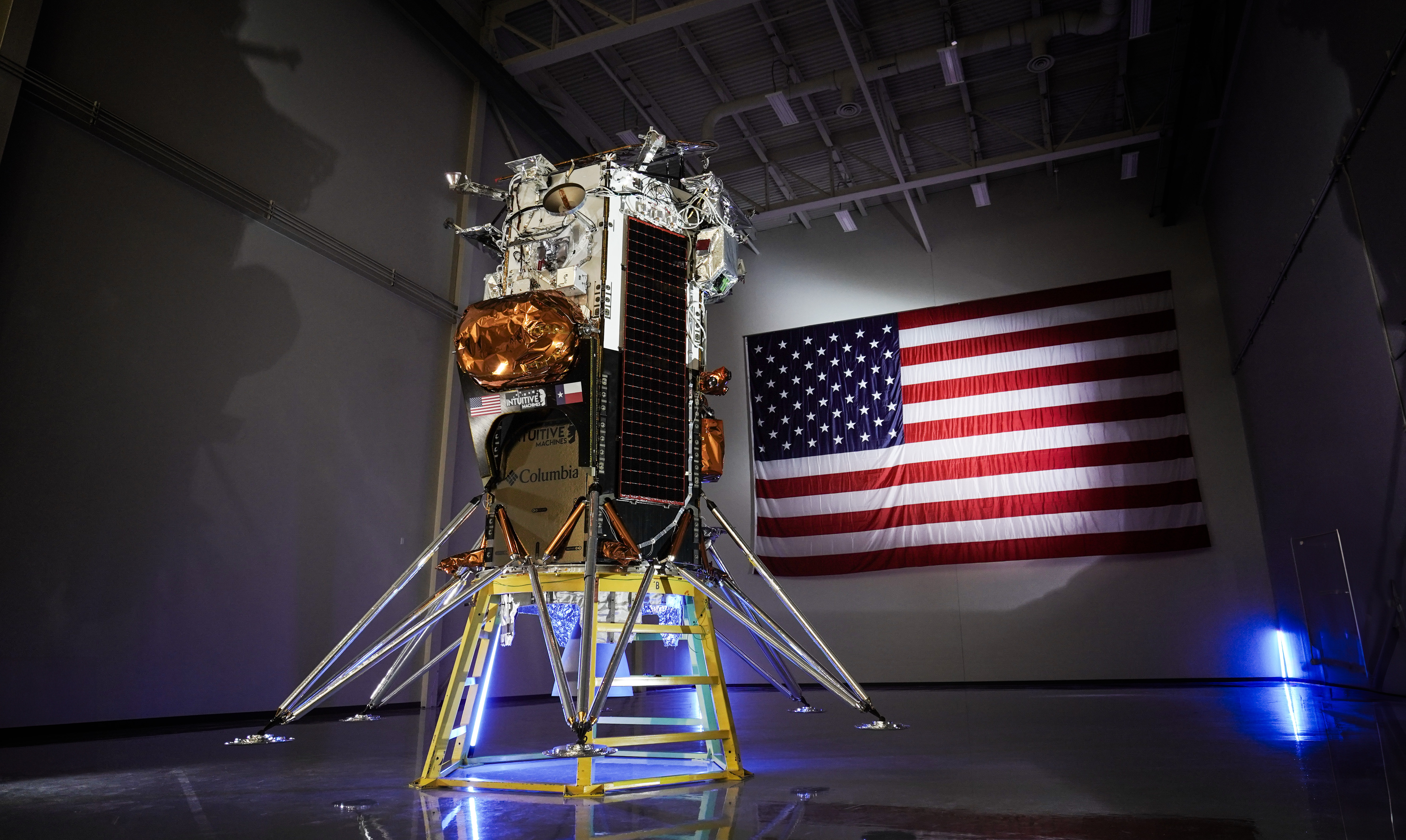
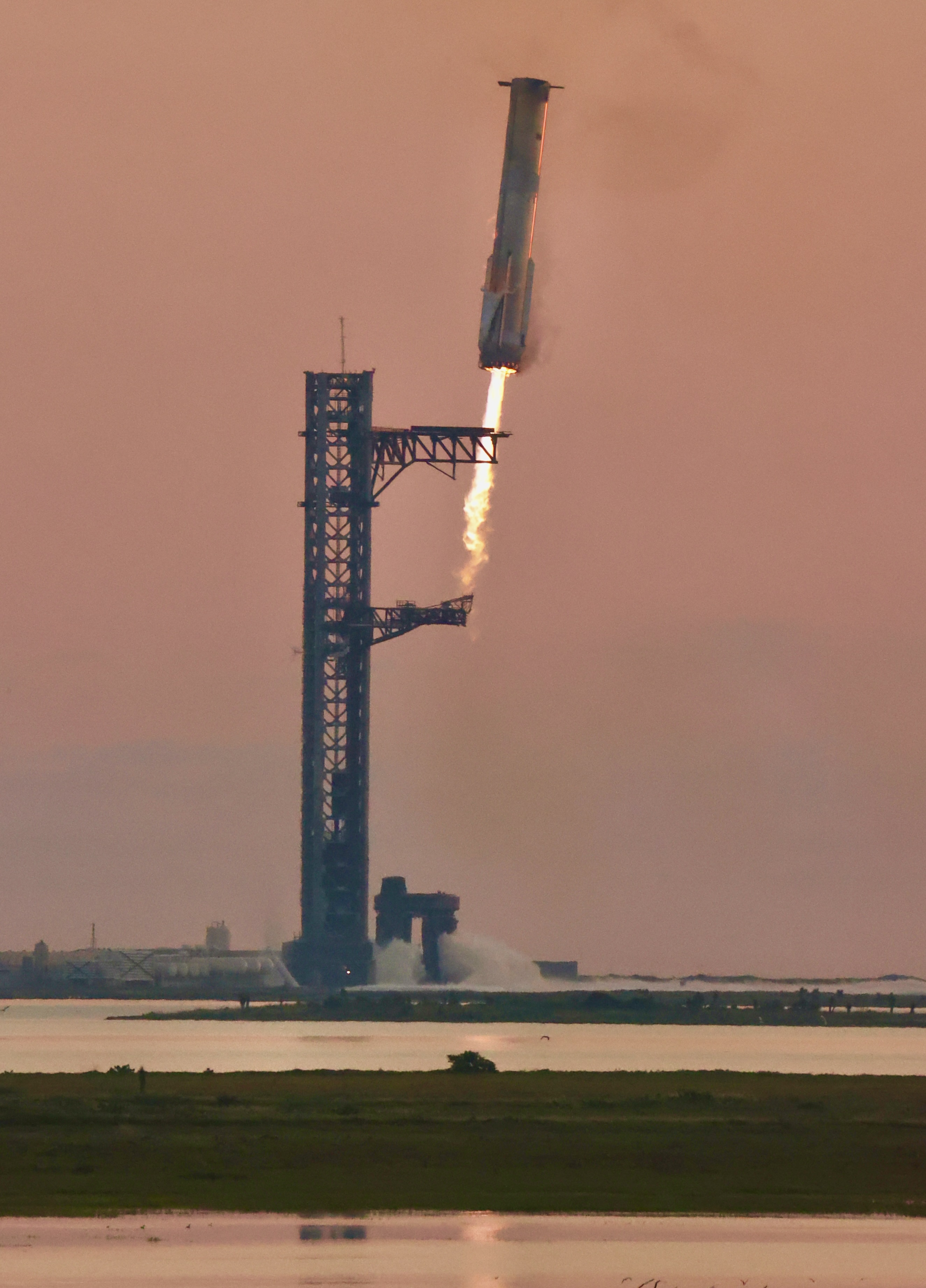
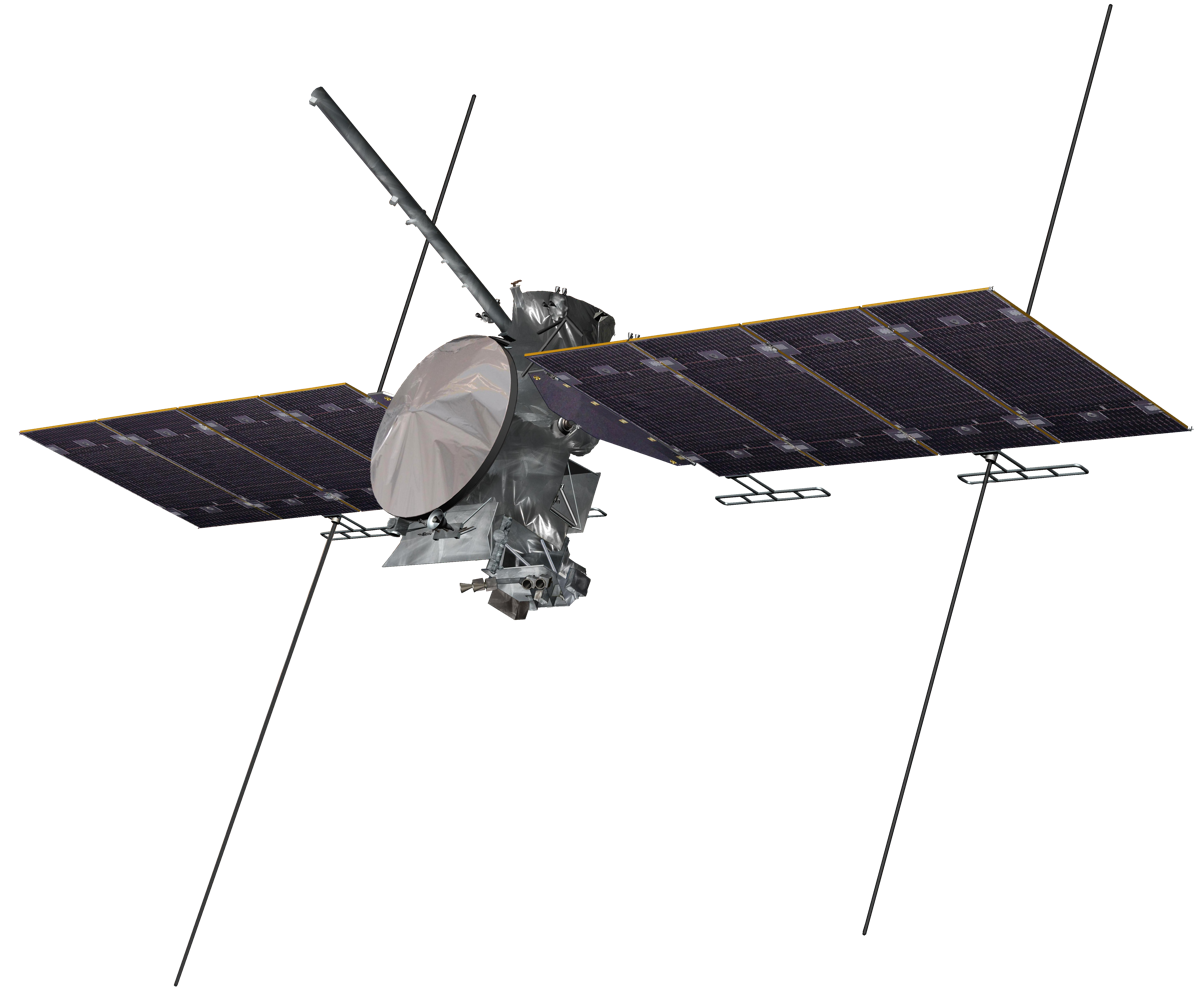
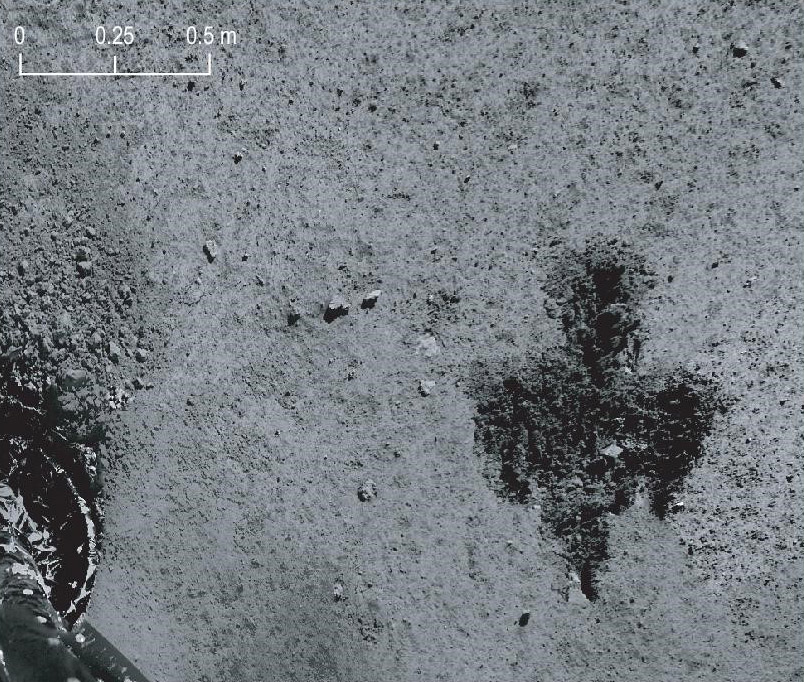
- Highlights from spaceflight in 2024 (Note: Clockwise from top: Intuitive Machines' Nova-C lunar lander touched down on the Moon, though it tipped over and was declared a partial success.; Europa Clipper launched, beginning a five-year journey to Jupiter's moon Europa (moon); Chang'e 6 successfully returned samples from the lunar far side; Starship flight test 5 saw the first successful catch of a Super Heavy booster)

Orbital launches
- First: 1 January
- Last: 31 December
- Total: 261
- Successes: 253
- Failures: 6
- Partial failures: 2
- Catalogued: 239

National firsts
- Satellite: Croatia; Senegal
- Space traveller: Belarus; Norway; Turkey
- Suborbital launch: Oman

Rockets
- Maiden flights: Angara A5 / Orion; Ariane 6 A62; Gravity-1; KAIROS; Kuaizhou 1A Pro; Long March 6C; Long March 5B / YZ-2; Long March 12; New-type satellite carrier rocket; Vulcan Centaur VC2S; Zhuque-2E
- Retirements: Delta IV Heavy; Soyuz-2.1v; Starship Block 1; Vega

Crewed flights
- Orbital: 9
- Orbital travellers: 28
- Suborbital: 5
- Suborbital travellers: 30
- Total travellers: 58

2024 in spaceflight

2024 saw new world records for orbital launch attempts and successful orbital launches for the fourth consecutive year. Notable milestones included the successful maiden launches of the American Vulcan Centaur and China's Gravity-1, and Long March 12 rockets. The European Ariane 6 rocket also conducted its inaugural flight, though it experienced a partial failure. SpaceX advanced its Starship development, with flight test 5 achieving the first landing of its first stage. Additionally, the final launch of a Delta family rocket, a Delta IV Heavy variant, occurred in April.

In September, the private Polaris Dawn mission made history by performing the first commercial spacewalk, during which two crew members exited their Crew Dragon spacecraft. This mission set a new record for the number of individuals—four—simultaneously exposed to the vacuum of space.

Two significant scientific missions were launched in October: NASA's Europa Clipper to Jupiter's moon Europa to look for signs of an ocean under its icy surface and ESA's Hera to the Didymos binary asteroid system that was impacted four years earlier by the DART spacecraft to validate the kinetic impact method of redirecting an asteroid on a trajectory to collide with Earth. On Mars, NASA's Ingenuity helicopter concluded operations in January after completing 72 flights when its rotor blades sustained critical damage.

The year also featured notable lunar missions. CNSA's Chang'e 6 successfully completed the first-ever sample return mission from far side of the Moon. JAXA's SLIM and Intuitive Machines' IM-1 achieved soft landings on the lunar surface; however, both landers tipped over during their final descent, leading to the conclusion of their missions shortly thereafter. With SLIM, Japan became the fifth country to accomplish a soft landing on the Moon.

A record for the most people simultaneously in orbit was set on 11 September, with 19 individuals. This was achieved following the launch of the three-person Soyuz MS-26 mission to the International Space Station (ISS), joining the nine crew members already aboard the ISS, the three crew members of China's Tiangong space station, and the four crew members of Polaris Dawn.

Throughout the year, the ISS hosted long-duration Expedition 70, 71, and 72 missions, as well as two short-term missions: the four-person crew of the privately operated Axiom Mission 3 (which included Alper Gezeravcı, the first Turkish astronaut) and the Russia's 21st Visiting Expedition (which included Maryna Vasileuskaya, the first Belarusian cosmonaut to reach space, excluding Soviet and Russian citizens of Belarusian origin). Meanwhile, Tiangong was visited by the long-term Shenzhou 18 and 19 missions.

== Overview ==
=== Astronomy and astrophysics ===
On New Year's Day at 3:40 UTC marking the first launch of the new year, ISRO launched their XPoSat for studying X-ray polarization. It will serve as a complement to the present IXPE probe of NASA. Later the ISRO's Aditya-L1 spacecraft launched 5 months previously was inserted into a halo orbit around the Earth-Sun L1 point on 6 January. It will study the solar atmosphere, solar magnetic storms, and their impact on the environment around Earth.

Einstein Probe, X-ray space telescope mission by the Chinese Academy of Sciences (CAS) in partnership with ESA and the Max Planck Institute for Extraterrestrial Physics (MPE) dedicated to time-domain high-energy astrophysics, was launched on 9 January 2024.

In April 2024, NASA began, under the direction of the Office of Science and Technology Policy to create a standard for time on the Moon, it is called Coordinated Lunar Time and is expected to be completed by 2026.

The Space Variable Objects Monitor (SVOM) is a small X-ray telescope satellite for studying the explosions of massive stars by analyzing the resulting gamma-ray bursts, developed by China National Space Administration (CNSA), Chinese Academy of Sciences (CAS) and the French Space Agency (CNES), launched on 22 June 2024 (07:00:00 UTC).

European Space Agency launched their PROBA-3 dual satellites for solar coronagraphy on 5 December 2024 on a PSLV-XL rocket.

=== Exploration of the Solar System ===
NASA's Mars helicopter Ingenuity flew its 72nd and last flight on 18 January. Because all four of its rotor blades were damaged, NASA subsequently announced the end of mission for Ingenuity on 25 January.

On 7 October, the ESA Hera spacecraft was launched successfully. It will arrive at the asteroid Didymos in 2026 after Mars flyby, where it will study the effects of the Double Asteroid Redirection Test.

NASA's Europa Clipper mission launched on 14 October to study the Galilean moon Europa while in orbit around Jupiter.

=== Lunar exploration ===
==== Artemis Program ====
In November, stacking operation begun for the Artemis II SLS solid rocket boosters segments. On 5 December, NASA updated the mission timeline, where Artemis II was delayed from 2025 September to 2026 April, and Artemis III from 2026 September to mid-2027. The delay is mainly attributed to problems involving the heat shield of the Orion spacecraft.

==== Peregrine ====
Peregrine lunar lander was successfully launched on 8 January, but after the launch a propellant leak was detected that precluded any attempt to perform a lunar landing. In the end, the Peregrine spacecraft never left the (highly elliptical) Earth orbit it was injected into by the carrier rocket, and the mission ended ten days later (after one orbit) on 18 January when the spacecraft re-entered the Earth's atmosphere (under control of the mission team) and was destroyed.

==== SLIM ====
SLIM achieved the first-ever lunar soft landing for a Japanese spacecraft. It landed on 19 January 2024 at 15:20 UTC, making Japan the 5th country to soft land on the Moon. Although it landed successfully, it landed on its side with the solar panels oriented westwards facing opposite the Sun at the start of lunar day, thereby failing to generate enough power. The lander operated on an internal battery power, which was fully drained that day.

Irrespective of this solar array issue on lander, the two LEV 1 and 2 rovers, deployed during hovering just before final landing worked as expected, with LEV-1 communicating independently to the ground stations. LEV-1 conducted seven hops over 107 minutes on lunar surface. Images taken by LEV-2 show the wrong attitude landing with loss of an engine nozzle during descent and even possible sustained damage to lander's Earth bound antenna, that is not pointed towards Earth. Irrespective of wrong attitude and loss of communication with the lander, the mission was fully successful after confirmation of its primary goal landing within 100 m (330 ft) of its landing spot was already achieved.

On 29 January, the lander resumed operations after being shut down for a week. JAXA said it re-established contact with the lander and its solar cells were working again after a shift in lighting conditions allowed it to catch sunlight. After that, SLIM was put in sleep mode for impending harsh lunar night. While SLIM was expected to operate only for one lunar daylight period, or 14 Earth days, with its on-board electronics not designed to withstand the −120 °C (−184 °F) nighttime temperatures on the Moon, it managed to survive three lunar nights, waking up on 25 February, 27 March and 24 April respectively, sending back more data and images. This feat of surviving lunar night without a radioisotope heater unit was only previously achieved by some landers in the Surveyor program.

==== Nova-C ====
IM-1 Nova-C Odysseus launched on 15 February 2024 towards the Moon via Falcon 9 on a direct intercept trajectory and later landed in the south polar region of the Moon on 22 February 2024 and became the first successful private lander and the first to do so using cryogenic propellants. Though it landed successfully, one of the lander's legs broke upon landing and it tilted up on other side, 18° due to landing on a slope, but the lander survived and payloads were functioning as expected.

Just before landing, at approximately 30 m (98 ft) above the lunar surface, the Odysseus lander was planned to eject the EagleCam camera-equipped CubeSat, which would have been dropped onto the lunar surface near the lander, with an impact velocity of about 10 m/s (22 mph). However, due to complications arising from the software patch, it was decided that EagleCam would not be ejected upon landing. It was later ejected on 28 February returning all types of data, except post IM-1 landing images that were the main aim of its mission.

The lander also includes the Lunar Library that contains a version of the English Wikipedia, artworks, selections from the Internet Archive, portions of the Project Gutenberg, and more. It is projected to reside on the Moon in a readable state for billions of years.

==== China Lunar Exploration Program ====
On 13 March, China attempted to launch two spacecrafts, DRO-A and DRO-B, into distant retrograde orbit around the Moon, but the mission failed to reach the strived for orbit, remaining stranded in a highly eliptical low Earth orbit. Tracking data appears to show China attempted to salvage the spacecraft and they appear to have succeeded in reaching their desired orbit.

On 20 March, China launched its relay satellite, Queqiao-2, to lunar orbit, along with two mini satellites Tiandu 1 and 2. Queqiao-2 will relay communications for the Chang'e 6 (far side of the Moon), Chang'e 7 and Chang'e 8 (Lunar south pole region) spacecrafts. Tiandu 1 and 2 will test technologies for a future lunar navigation and positioning constellation. All the three probes entered lunar orbit successfully on 24 March 2024 (Both were attached to each other and separated in lunar orbit on 3 April 2024).

China sent Chang'e 6 on 3 May 2024, which conducted the first lunar sample return from Apollo Basin on the far side of the Moon. This is China's second lunar sample return mission, the first was achieved by Chang'e 5 from the lunar near side four years earlier. It carries several international payloads as well as an un-(pre)announced Chinese mini-rover called Jinchan to conduct infrared spectroscopy of lunar surface and imaged Chang'e 6 lander on lunar surface. The lander-ascender-rover combination was separated from the orbiter and returner before landing on 1 June 2024 at 22:23 UTC. It landed on the Moon's surface on 1 June 2024. The ascender was launched back to lunar orbit on 3 June 2024 at 23:38 UTC, carrying samples collected by the lander, and completed rendezvous and docking with the waiting orbiter in lunar orbit. The sample container was transferred to the returner, which landed in Inner Mongolia on 25 June 2024, completing China's lunar far side sample return mission. Pakistan sent a lunar orbiter called ICUBE-Q along with Chang'e 6. The lander also placed a small national flag of China, made of basalt, a substance that occurs in vast quantities on the Moon's surface, to demonstrate the spirit of in situ resource utilization. After dropping off the return samples for Earth, the Chang'e 6 (CE-6) orbiter was successfully captured by the Sun-Earth L2 Lagrange point on 9 September 2024.

==== Future ====
DARPA provided funding towards a forward looking 10 year lunar architecture proposals. Aimed at creating the beginning stages of a lunar economy the DARPA lunar programs is participated in by many current industry leaders.

=== Human spaceflight ===
On 4 February, Russian cosmonaut Oleg Kononenko broke the world record for the most time spent in space, when he surpassed the previous record of 878 days, 11 hours, 29 minutes and 48 seconds held by retired cosmonaut Gennady Padalka. After Kononenko returned on 23 September, the new records stands at 1110 days, 14 hours and 57 minutes.

On 5 June, Boeing's Starliner spacecraft conducted its crewed test flight. Sunita Williams became the first woman to fly on the maiden crewed flight of an orbital spacecraft (for a suborbital spacecraft, similar feat was accomplished by Wally Funk on Blue Origin NS-16 mission of New Shepard).

On 11 September, following the launch of Soyuz MS-26, a record breaking 19 people were simultaneously in orbit around Earth. In addition to the crew of MS-26, this included the crews of Polaris Dawn, Boe-CFT, SpaceX Crew-8, Soyuz MS-25 and Shenzhou 18.

On 17 December, two Chinese astronauts, Cai Xuzhe and Song Lingdong, completed the longest spacewalk in human history, of 9 hours and 6 minutes, with the assistance of the space station's robotic arms and ground-based scientific personnel, completed tasks such as the installation of space debris protection devices, inspection, and maintenance of external equipment and facilities.

==== Private human spaceflight and space tourism ====
SpaceX launched Axiom Mission 3 aboard a Crew Dragon spacecraft on a Falcon 9 rocket to the International Space Station (ISS) on 18 January 2024. The successful mission ended with a splashdown on 9 February 2024.

On 26 January, Virgin Galactic's SpaceShipTwo VSS Unity was successfully launched from Spaceport America on Galactic 06 suborbital space tourism mission. Galactic 07 launched on 8 June, the final flight of Unity suborbital spaceplane.

Blue Origin's New Shepard also returned to suborbital space tourism launches with the successful NS-25 mission on 19 May. The next mission, NS-26, took place on 29 August and NS-28, that took place on 22 November.

Polaris Dawn, featuring the first commercial spacewalk, launched on 10 September 09:23 UTC. On 11 September, the spacecraft reached an altitude of 1400 km, which is farther from Earth than any person has been since Apollo 17.

=== Rocket innovation ===
The maiden flight of United Launch Alliance's Vulcan Centaur took place on 8 January 2024. Vulcan is the first methane fueled rocket to reach orbit on its first attempt, and the first methane fueled rocket to reach orbit from the US.

China's Orienspace's Gravity-1 rocket completed its successful maiden flight on 11 January 2024, debuting on a new mobile sea platform in the Yellow Sea while breaking records as both the world's largest solid-fuel carrier rocket and China's most powerful commercial launch vehicle to date (as of early 2024).

On 5 March, for the first time due to their fast turnaround of 1 hour 51 minutes between launches, SpaceX launch operations for a mission (in this case, Starlink Group 6-41) coincided with that of a preceding launch (in this case, payload deployment of Transporter-10:(53 payloads SmallSat Rideshare).

On 13 March, the KAIROS rocket from Space One company attempted its maiden flight. The rocket was destroyed in an explosion five seconds after lift-off. No injuries were caused by the explosion.

On 11 April, another test flight of the Russian Angara A5 launched, with the Orion upper stage being used for the first time.

On 7 May, Long March 6C flew its successful maiden mission.

SpaceX's Starship launched its fourth integrated flight test (IFT-4) on 6 June 2024. The launch resulted in the successful controlled splashdown of both the Super Heavy booster and the Starship vehicle.

In June, Stoke Space tested its full flow staged combustion cycle (FFSC) engine with a successful hotfire, the test marks only the fourth FFSC engine to have made it far enough in development to reach hotfire.

The maiden launch of Ariane 6 occurred on 9 July, but it was a partial failure as though CubeSats were deployed correctly, but the second stage failed to relight due to an anomaly with an auxiliary power unit. The second stage could not be deorbited and payloads studying and testing re-entry could not be deployed.

On 13 October, Starship flew its fifth orbital flight test during which, for the first time, the first stage booster was recovered. This makes Super Heavy the second ever orbital class rocket booster to be recovered by the use of retropropulsive landing (first being the Falcon 9 booster).

On 30 November, Long March 12 successfully launched on its debut flight. Importantly, the launch also marked the debut of the YF-100K engine that will power the first stage of Long March 10 which is expected to send Chinese astronauts to the Moon before 2030.

The maiden flight of Blue Origin's New Glenn was planned for November. Initial rollout of the vehicle and testing was completed in February and in May Blue Origin planned to conduct additional testing in preparation for launch. On 12 June Blue Origin received the communications license necessary for the flight. The launch was rescheduled for December 2024 or early 2025.

=== Satellite technology ===
Plankton, Aerosol, Cloud, ocean Ecosystem or PACE, a NASA Earth-observing satellite, launched on 8 February 2024.

In March, China successfully launched the Queqiao-2 relay satellite mission. The satellite is designed to act as a communication relay between Chang’e missions (including the Chang'e 6) and Earth. The satellite was announced as operational in April.

In April, NASA launched a next-generation solar sail demonstration aboard a Rocket Lab Electron.

ESA EarthCARE launched on 28 May. Joint mission with JAXA.

NASA's GOES-U launched on 25 June, with the capability to detect coronal mass ejections.

JAXA's ALOS-4 launched on 1 July. It carries PALSAR-3 (Phased Array type L-band Synthetic Aperture Radar-3).

Ending the year with the launch of PSLVC-60 on 30 December 2024, ISRO launched the SpaDeX mission, which aims to prove the organization's docking technology. This technology is crucial for ISRO's upcoming Gaganyaan Human Spaceflight Program and the Chandrayaan-4 lunar sample return project.

== Orbital launches ==
Numbers of orbital launches
| Month | Total | Successes | Failures | Partial failures |
|---|---|---|---|---|
| January | 22 | 22 | 0 | 0 |
| February | 19 | 19 | 0 | 0 |
| March | 22 | 20 | 1 | 1 |
| April | 19 | 19 | 0 | 0 |
| May | 26 | 25 | 1 | 0 |
| June | 17 | 17 | 0 | 0 |
| July | 13 | 10 | 2 | 1 |
| August | 21 | 21 | 0 | 0 |
| September | 23 | 23 | 0 | 0 |
| October | 19 | 19 | 0 | 0 |
| November | 30 | 30 | 0 | 0 |
| December | 30 | 28 | 2 | 0 |
| Total | 261 | 253 | 6 | 2 |

== Launches from the Moon ==
| Date and time (UTC) | Rocket | Flight number | Launch site | | LSP | |
| Date and time (UTC) | Payload (⚀ = CubeSat) | Operator | Orbit | Function | Decay (UTC) | Outcome |
| Date and time (UTC) | Remarks | | | | | |
|---|---|---|---|---|---|---|
| 3 June; 23:38:10 | (China) Chang'e 6 ascent vehicle | | Chang'e 6 descent stage, Apollo Basin | | (China) CNSA | |
| 3 June; 23:38:10 | (China) Lunar soil sample container | CNSA | Selenocentric orbit | Sample return | 6 June 2024 | Successful |
| 3 June; 23:38:10 | Sample return mission. Launch happened roughly 48 hours after landing, during which lunar samples were collected. The ascent vehicle rendezvoused and docked with Chang'e 6 orbiter waiting in the lunar orbit and transferred the collected lunar samples to return vehicle for return to Earth. | | | | | |

== Deep-space rendezvous ==
| Date (UTC) | Spacecraft | Event | Remarks |
|---|---|---|---|
| 19 January | SLIM | Lunar landing | Success |
| Late January | Peregrine | Lunar orbit insertion | Precluded due to propellant leak developing shortly after launch. |
| 3 February | Juno | 58th perijove | On the day of this perijove, Juno flew by Io at a distance of 1,500 km. Orbital period around Jupiter reduced to 33 days. |
| 21 February | Nova-C (IM-1 Odysseus) | Lunar orbit insertion | Success |
| 22 February | Nova-C (IM-1 Odysseus) | Lunar landing | Partial success; lander touched down successfully, but one of the footpads came to rest on a rock, and the lander leaned over, then toppled on its side. The lander survived the fall, with instrumentation and solar panels oriented upward. |
| 7 March | Juno | 59th perijove | On the day of this perijove, Juno flew by Amalthea at a distance of 117,500 km. |
| 24 March | Queqiao-2 | Lunar orbit insertion | Success |
| 24 March | Tiandu 1 and 2 | Lunar orbit insertion | Success |
| 30 March | Parker Solar Probe | 19th perihelion | Success |
| 8 May | Chang'e 6 | Lunar orbit insertion | Success |
| 1 June | Chang'e 6 lander and ascent vehicle | Lunar landing | Success; Landing site is in the southern portion of Apollo crater within South Pole-Aitken basin on the far side of the moon. coordinates 41.64°S 153.99°W |
| 6 June | Chang'e 6 ascent vehicle and orbiter | Lunar orbit rendezvous | Docking of ascent vehicle with orbiter; transfer of sample container from ascent vehicle to orbiter/return module. |
| 25 June | Chang'e 6 orbiter and re-entry capsule | Trans-Earth injection | Orbiter and re-entry capsule separated after Earth orbit injection |
| 25 June | Chang'e 6 re-entry capsule | Lunar sample return | Re-entry capsule bounced off the atmosphere once and landed in Inner Mongolia |
| 30 June | Parker Solar Probe | 20th perihelion | Success |
| 19 August | Juice | Gravity assist at Moon | Success, target altitude 700 km |
| 20 August | Juice | Gravity assist at Earth | Success, target altitude 6,807 km |
| 5 September | BepiColombo | Fourth gravity assist at Mercury | Success, target altitude 165 km, closest planetary flyby ever performed |
| 30 September | Parker Solar Probe | 21st perihelion | Success |
| 6 November | Parker Solar Probe | Seventh gravity assist at Venus | Success, target altitude 317 km |
| 2 December | BepiColombo | Fifth gravity assist at Mercury | Success, target altitude 37,626 km |
| 13 December | Lucy | Second gravity assist at Earth | Success, target altitude 350 km |
| 24 December | Parker Solar Probe | 22nd perihelion, closest approach to the Sun | Success, at 6 million km from the Sun |

== Extravehicular activities (EVAs) ==
| Start Date/Time | Duration | End time | Spacecraft | Crew | Remarks |
|---|---|---|---|---|---|
| 1 March 2024; 21:40 | 7 hours 52 minutes | 05:32 (next day) | Shenzhou 17; TSS Wentian | (China) Tang Hongbo (China) Jiang Xinlin | Fourteenth EVA from the Tiangong space station. Tasks included maintenance of the solar panels of the Tianhe core module, which have sustained minor damage caused by impacts of space debris and micrometeoroids; evaluation and analysis of the performance status of the solar panel power generation and also inspection of the status of the space station modules. |
| 25 April 2024; 14:57 | 4 hours, 36 minutes | 19:33 | Expedition 71; ISS Poisk | (Russia) Oleg Kononenko (Russia) Nikolai Chub | The cosmonauts ventured out and released launch locks on the Mini Radar Unit to get it deployed and installed a series of experiments TKK and Kvartz onto Poisk including a monoblock payload adapter and boom and photograph the Russian Segment.The Cosmonauts also repositioned the Plume Measurement Unit, removed an ion radiation probe and jettisoned it, and retrieved the Biorisk canisters for return to earth. The cosmonauts also wiped down the handrails on Nauka and Poisk to check for microbial growth and contamination from the radiator leak and from visiting vehicles and hydrazine from Nauka's arrival. |
| 28 May 2024; 02:35 | 8 hours 23 minutes | 10:58 | Shenzhou 18; TSS Wentian | (China) Ye Guangfu (China) Li Guangsu | Longest Chinese spacewalk to date. Tasks included installing space debris protection devices and conducting inspections of extravehicular equipment and facilities. |
| 24 June 2024; 12:46 | 31 minutes | 13:17 | Expedition 71; ISS Quest | (United States) Tracy Caldwell Dyson (United States) Michael Barratt | Dyson and Barratt were intended to venture out and retrieve the SASA Antenna and bring it inside, collect samples from the station's hull to look for signs of microbial growth that could be present on the modules either after launch or exposed to space, and prep the LEE A Wrist Joint Replacement Module for installation on an upcoming spacewalk. However, the spacewalk was terminated shortly after depress due to a water leak in the service and cooling umbilical unit on Dyson’s spacesuit. |
| 3 July 2024; 08:19 | 6 hours 32 minutes | 14:51 | Shenzhou 18; TSS Wentian | (China) Ye Guangfu (China) Li Cong | Tasks included installing space debris protection devices and conducting inspections of extravehicular equipment and facilities. |
| 12 September 2024; 10:12 | 26 minutes (Note: hatch open to hatch close) | 11:58 | Crew Dragon Resilience | (United States) Jared Isaacman (United States) Sarah Gillis (United States) Scott Poteet (United States) Anna Menon | Testing EVA capability of Dragon and a new suit designed by SpaceX. Isaacman left the capsule for 7 minutes and 56 seconds followed by Gillis, who left the capsule for 7 minutes and 15 seconds. The other two crew members were exposed to the vacuum of space in the capsule, but did not leave it. First all-private crew spacewalk with commercially developed hardware, procedures, and the EVA suit. New record for most people exposed to the vacuum of space at a time. |
| 17 December; 04:51 | 9 hours, 6 minutes | 13:57 | Shenzhou 19; TSS Wentian | (China) Cai Xuzhe (China) Song Lingdong | The two astronauts completed the longest spacewalk in human history with the assistance of the space station's robotic arms and ground-based scientific personnel, completed tasks such as the installation of space debris protection devices, inspection, and maintenance of external equipment and facilities. |
| 19 December; 15:36 | 7 hours, 17 minutes | 22:53 | Expedition 72; ISS Poisk | (Russia) Aleksey Ovchinin (Russia) Ivan Vagner | The cosmonauts ventured outside and installed an x-ray telescope on plain 5 of the Zvezda Service Module, jettisoned an ion radiation probe, retrieved Biorisk, TEST, and two exposure experiments on Zvezda and Poisk, and rewired Zvezda and replaced two patch panels which were showing signs of degraded insulation, electronics, and frayed wiring. The task to relocate the ERA control panel was moved to another spacewalk because of time and because of a late start. |

== Space debris events ==
| Date/Time (UTC) | Source object | Event type | Pieces tracked | Remarks |
|---|---|---|---|---|
| 26 March | (China) Long March 6A upper stage | Breakup | ~60 | Energetic fragmentation event; Cause Unknown; but may be related to upper stage passivization or insulation. |
| 26 June | (Russia) Resurs-P No.1 | Breakup | 100+ | Unknown |
| 4 July | (China) Long March 6A upper stage | Breakup | ? | Energetic fragmentation event; Cause Unknown; but may be related to upper stage passivization or insulation. |
| 6 August | (China) Long March 6A upper stage | Breakup | 700-900+ | Energetic fragmentation event; Cause Unknown; but may be related to upper stage passivization or insulation. |
| 6 September | (United States) Atlas V Centaur | Breakup | 40+ | Unknown |
| 19 October | (Luxembourg) / (United States) Intelsat 33e | Breakup | ~500 | Unknown; potential threat to all spacecraft in geostationary orbit, including the Russian satellites, Ekspress-AT1, Yamal-402, Ekspress-AM6 and Elektro-L. |
| 18 December | (United States) DMSP-5D2 F14 | Breakup | 50+ | Energetic fragmentation event; Spacecraft was part of a family of spacecraft that all have a design flaw in the battery assembly which makes them vulnerable to explosion; likely caused by passivisation process as the satellite was designed before space debris mitigation practices were enacted. |

== Orbital launch statistics ==
=== By country ===
For the purposes of this section, the yearly tally of orbital launches by country assigns each flight to the country of origin of the rocket, not to the launch services provider or the spaceport. For a launch attempt to be considered orbital it must be trying to achieve a positive perigee. For this reason the fourth and fifth flight tests of Starship are not included in the orbital statistics for 2024. Launches from the Moon are not included in the statistics.

| Country | Launches | Successes | Failures | Partial failures |
|---|---|---|---|---|
| China | 68 | 65 | 2 | 1 |
| France | 1 | 0 | 0 | 1 |
| India | 5 | 5 | 0 | 0 |
| Iran | 4 | 4 | 0 | 0 |
| Italy | 2 | 2 | 0 | 0 |
| Japan | 7 | 5 | 2 | 0 |
| North Korea | 1 | 0 | 1 | 0 |
| Russia | 17 | 17 | 0 | 0 |
| United States | 156 (Note: Includes Electron launches from Māhia) | 155 | 1 | 0 |
| World | 261 | 253 | 6 | 2 |

=== By rocket ===
- Ceres-1
- Electron
- Falcon 9 new
- Falcon 9 reused
- Falcon Heavy
- H-IIA
- H3
- GSLV
- PSLV
- SSLV
- Kinetica 1
- Kuaizhou 1A
- Kuaizhou 11
- Long March 2
- Long March 3
- Long March 4
- Long March 5
- Long March 6
- Long March 7
- Long March 8
- Long March 12
- Soyuz-2
- Soyuz-2-1v
- Atlas V
- Jielong 3
- KAIROS
- Qaem 100
- Simorgh
- Starship
- Vulcan Centaur
- Others

==== By family ====
| Family | Country | Launches | Successes | Failures | Partial failures | Remarks |
|---|---|---|---|---|---|---|
| Alpha | United States | 1 | 1 | 0 | 0 | |
| Angara | Russia | 2 | 2 | 0 | 0 | |
| Ariane | France | 1 | 0 | 0 | 1 | |
| Atlas | United States | 2 | 2 | 0 | 0 | |
| Ceres | China | 5 | 5 | 0 | 0 | |
| Delta | United States | 1 | 1 | 0 | 0 | Final flight |
| Electron | United States | 14 | 14 | 0 | 0 | |
| Falcon | United States | 134 | 133 | 1 | 0 | |
| Gravity | China | 1 | 1 | 0 | 0 | Maiden flight |
| H-series | Japan | 5 | 5 | 0 | 0 | |
| Hyperbola | China | 1 | 0 | 1 | 0 | |
| ILV | India | 5 | 5 | 0 | 0 | |
| Jielong | China | 2 | 2 | 0 | 0 | |
| KAIROS | Japan | 2 | 0 | 2 | 0 | Maiden flight |
| Kinetica | China | 4 | 3 | 1 | 0 | |
| Kuaizhou | China | 5 | 5 | 0 | 0 | |
| Long March | China | 49 | 48 | 0 | 1 | |
| New-type satellite carrier rocket | North Korea | 1 | 0 | 1 | 0 | Maiden flight |
| Qaem | Iran | 2 | 2 | 0 | 0 | |
| R-7 | Russia | 15 | 15 | 0 | 0 | |
| Simorgh | Iran | 2 | 2 | 0 | 0 | |
| Starship | United States | 2 | 2 | 0 | 0 | |
| Vega | Italy | 2 | 2 | 0 | 0 | |
| Vulcan | United States | 2 | 2 | 0 | 0 | Maiden flight |
| Zhuque | China | 1 | 1 | 0 | 0 | |

==== By type ====
| Rocket | Country | Family | Launches | Successes | Failures | Partial failures | Remarks |
|---|---|---|---|---|---|---|---|
| Alpha | United States | Alpha | 1 | 1 | 0 | 0 | |
| Angara-1.2 | Russia | Angara | 1 | 1 | 0 | 0 | |
| Angara A5 | Russia | Angara | 1 | 1 | 0 | 0 | |
| Ariane 6 | France | Ariane | 1 | 0 | 0 | 1 | Maiden flight |
| Atlas V | United States | Atlas | 2 | 2 | 0 | 0 | |
| Ceres-1 | China | Ceres | 5 | 5 | 0 | 0 | |
| Delta IV | United States | Delta | 1 | 1 | 0 | 0 | Final flight |
| Electron | United States | Electron | 14 | 14 | 0 | 0 | |
| Falcon 9 | United States | Falcon | 134 | 133 | 1 | 0 | Broke world record for most consecutive successful orbital launches (325) and for most consecutive booster landings (267). |
| GSLV | India | ILV | 1 | 1 | 0 | 0 | |
| Gravity-1 | China | Gravity | 1 | 1 | 0 | 0 | Maiden flight |
| H-IIA | Japan | H-series | 2 | 2 | 0 | 0 | |
| H3 | Japan | H-series | 3 | 3 | 0 | 0 | |
| Hyperbola-1 | China | Hyperbola | 1 | 0 | 1 | 0 | |
| Jielong 3 | China | Jielong | 2 | 2 | 0 | 0 | |
| KAIROS | Japan | KAIROS | 2 | 0 | 2 | 0 | Maiden flight |
| Kinetica 1 | China | Kinetica | 4 | 3 | 1 | 0 | |
| Kuaizhou 1 | China | Kuaizhou | 4 | 4 | 0 | 0 | |
| Kuaizhou 11 | China | Kuaizhou | 1 | 1 | 0 | 0 | |
| Long March 2 | China | Long March | 18 | 17 | 0 | 1 | |
| Long March 3 | China | Long March | 8 | 8 | 0 | 0 | |
| Long March 4 | China | Long March | 6 | 6 | 0 | 0 | |
| Long March 5 | China | Long March | 3 | 3 | 0 | 0 | |
| Long March 6 | China | Long March | 8 | 8 | 0 | 0 | |
| Long March 7 | China | Long March | 4 | 4 | 0 | 0 | |
| Long March 8 | China | Long March | 1 | 1 | 0 | 0 | |
| Long March 12 | China | Long March | 1 | 1 | 0 | 0 | Maiden flight |
| New-type satellite carrier rocket | North Korea | New-type satellite carrier rocket | 1 | 0 | 1 | 0 | Maiden flight |
| PSLV | India | ILV | 3 | 3 | 0 | 0 | |
| Qaem 100 | Iran | Qaem | 2 | 2 | 0 | 0 | |
| Simorgh | Iran | Simorgh | 2 | 2 | 0 | 0 | |
| SSLV | India | ILV | 1 | 1 | 0 | 0 | |
| Soyuz-2 | Russia | R-7 | 15 | 15 | 0 | 0 | |
| Starship | United States | Starship | 2 | 2 | 0 | 0 | |
| Vega | Italy | Vega | 2 | 2 | 0 | 0 | |
| Vulcan Centaur | United States | Vulcan | 2 | 2 | 0 | 0 | Maiden flight |
| Zhuque-2 | China | Zhuque | 1 | 1 | 0 | 0 | |

==== By configuration ====
| Rocket | Country | Type | Launches | Successes | Failures | Partial failures | Remarks |
|---|---|---|---|---|---|---|---|
| Alpha | United States | Alpha | 1 | 1 | 0 | 0 | |
| Angara-1.2 | Russia | Angara-1.2 | 1 | 1 | 0 | 0 | |
| Angara A5 / Orion | Russia | Angara A5 | 1 | 1 | 0 | 0 | Maiden flight |
| Ariane 62 | France | Ariane 6 | 1 | 0 | 0 | 1 | Maiden flight |
| Atlas V 551 | United States | Atlas V | 1 | 1 | 0 | 0 | |
| Atlas V N22 | United States | Atlas V | 1 | 1 | 0 | 0 | |
| Ceres-1 | China | Ceres-1 | 2 | 2 | 0 | 0 | |
| Ceres-1S | China | Ceres-1 | 3 | 3 | 0 | 0 | |
| Delta IV Heavy | United States | Delta IV | 1 | 1 | 0 | 0 | Final flight |
| Electron | United States | Electron | 14 | 14 | 0 | 0 | |
| Falcon 9 Block 5 | United States | Falcon 9 | 132 | 131 | 1 | 0 | |
| Falcon Heavy | United States | Falcon 9 | 2 | 2 | 0 | 0 | |
| GSLV Mk-II | India | GSLV | 1 | 1 | 0 | 0 | |
| Gravity-1 | China | Gravity-1 | 1 | 1 | 0 | 0 | Maiden flight |
| H-IIA 202 | Japan | H-IIA | 2 | 2 | 0 | 0 | |
| H3-22S | Japan | H3 | 3 | 3 | 0 | 0 | |
| Hyperbola-1 | China | Hyperbola-1 | 1 | 0 | 1 | 0 | |
| Jielong 3 | China | Jielong 3 | 2 | 2 | 0 | 0 | |
| KAIROS | Japan | KAIROS | 2 | 0 | 2 | 0 | Maiden flight |
| Kinetica 1 | China | Kinetica 1 | 4 | 3 | 1 | 0 | |
| Kuaizhou 1A | China | Kuaizhou 1 | 3 | 3 | 0 | 0 | Final flight |
| Kuaizhou 1A Pro | China | Kuaizhou 1 | 1 | 1 | 0 | 0 | Maiden flight |
| Kuaizhou 11 | China | Kuaizhou 11 | 1 | 1 | 0 | 0 | |
| Long March 2C | China | Long March 2 | 6 | 6 | 0 | 0 | |
| Long March 2C / YZ-1S | China | Long March 2 | 1 | 0 | 0 | 1 | |
| Long March 2D | China | Long March 2 | 7 | 7 | 0 | 0 | |
| Long March 2D / YZ-3 | China | Long March 2 | 2 | 2 | 0 | 0 | |
| Long March 2F/G | China | Long March 2 | 2 | 2 | 0 | 0 | |
| Long March 3B/E | China | Long March 3 | 6 | 6 | 0 | 0 | |
| Long March 3B/E / YZ-1 | China | Long March 3 | 2 | 2 | 0 | 0 | |
| Long March 4B | China | Long March 4 | 4 | 4 | 0 | 0 | |
| Long March 4C | China | Long March 4 | 2 | 2 | 0 | 0 | |
| Long March 5 | China | Long March 5 | 2 | 2 | 0 | 0 | |
| Long March 5B / YZ-2 | China | Long March 5 | 1 | 1 | 0 | 0 | Maiden flight |
| Long March 6 | China | Long March 6 | 2 | 2 | 0 | 0 | |
| Long March 6A | China | Long March 6 | 5 | 5 | 0 | 0 | |
| Long March 6C | China | Long March 6 | 1 | 1 | 0 | 0 | Maiden flight |
| Long March 7 | China | Long March 7 | 2 | 2 | 0 | 0 | |
| Long March 7A | China | Long March 7 | 2 | 2 | 0 | 0 | |
| Long March 8 | China | Long March 8 | 1 | 1 | 0 | 0 | |
| Long March 12 | China | Long March 12 | 1 | 1 | 0 | 0 | Maiden flight |
| New-type satellite carrier rocket | North Korea | New-type satellite carrier rocket | 1 | 0 | 1 | 0 | Maiden flight |
| PSLV-CA | India | PSLV | 1 | 1 | 0 | 0 | |
| PSLV-DL | India | PSLV | 1 | 1 | 0 | 0 | |
| PSLV-XL | India | PSLV | 1 | 1 | 0 | 0 | |
| Qaem 100 | Iran | Qaem 100 | 2 | 2 | 0 | 0 | |
| Simorgh | Iran | Simorgh | 2 | 2 | 0 | 0 | |
| SSLV | India | SSLV | 1 | 1 | 0 | 0 | |
| Soyuz-2.1a | Russia | Soyuz-2 | 7 | 7 | 0 | 0 | |
| Soyuz-2.1a / Fregat | Russia | Soyuz-2 | 1 | 1 | 0 | 0 | |
| Soyuz-2.1b | Russia | Soyuz-2 | 3 | 3 | 0 | 0 | |
| Soyuz-2.1b / Fregat | Russia | Soyuz-2 | 3 | 3 | 0 | 0 | |
| Soyuz-2-1v | Russia | Soyuz-2 | 1 | 1 | 0 | 0 | Final flight |
| Starship Block 1 | United States | Starship | 2 | 2 | 0 | 0 | Final flight |
| Vega | Italy | Vega | 1 | 1 | 0 | 0 | Final flight |
| Vega C | Italy | Vega | 1 | 1 | 0 | 0 | |
| Vulcan Centaur VC2S | United States | Vulcan Centaur | 2 | 2 | 0 | 0 | Maiden flight |
| Zhuque-2E | China | Zhuque-2 | 1 | 1 | 0 | 0 | Maiden flight |

=== By spaceport ===
- Jiuquan
- South China Sea
- Taiyuan
- Wenchang
- Xichang
- Yellow Sea
- Kourou
- Satish Dhawan
- Semnan
- Shahroud
- Kii
- Tanegashima
- Baikonur
- Māhia
- Sohae
- Plesetsk
- Vostochny
- Cape Canaveral
- Kennedy
- MARS
- Starbase
- Vandenberg

| Site | Country | Launches | Successes | Failures | Partial failures | Remarks |
|---|---|---|---|---|---|---|
| Baikonur | Kazakhstan | 8 | 8 | 0 | 0 | |
| Cape Canaveral | United States | 67 | 67 | 0 | 0 | |
| Jiuquan | China | 21 | 19 | 2 | 0 | |
| Kennedy | United States | 26 | 26 | 0 | 0 | |
| Kii | Japan | 2 | 0 | 2 | 0 | First launch |
| Kourou | France | 3 | 2 | 0 | 1 | |
| Māhia | New Zealand | 13 | 13 | 0 | 0 | |
| MARS | United States | 1 | 1 | 0 | 0 | |
| Plesetsk | Russia | 5 | 5 | 0 | 0 | |
| Satish Dhawan | India | 5 | 5 | 0 | 0 | |
| Semnan | Iran | 2 | 2 | 0 | 0 | |
| Shahroud | Iran | 2 | 2 | 0 | 0 | |
| Sohae | North Korea | 1 | 0 | 1 | 0 | |
| South China Sea | China | 3 | 3 | 0 | 0 | |
| Starbase | United States | 2 | 2 | 0 | 0 | |
| Taiyuan | China | 13 | 13 | 0 | 0 | |
| Tanegashima | Japan | 5 | 5 | 0 | 0 | |
| Vandenberg | United States | 47 | 46 | 1 | 0 | |
| Vostochny | Russia | 4 | 4 | 0 | 0 | |
| Wenchang | China | 9 | 9 | 0 | 0 | |
| Xichang | China | 19 | 18 | 0 | 1 | |
| Yellow Sea | China | 3 | 3 | 0 | 0 | |
| Total | | 261 | 253 | 6 | 2 | |

=== By orbit ===
- Transatmospheric
- Low Earth
- Low Earth (ISS)
- Low Earth (CSS)
- Low Earth (SSO)
- Low Earth (polar)
- Medium Earth
- Molniya
- Geosynchronous
- High Earth
- Lunar transfer
- Heliocentric

| Orbital regime | Launches | Achieved | Not achieved | Accidentally achieved | Remarks |
|---|---|---|---|---|---|
| Transatmospheric | 2 | 1 | 1 | 0 | |
| Low Earth / Sun-synchronous | 218 | 213 | 5 | 1 | Including flights to ISS and Tiangong (CSS) |
| Geosynchronous / Tundra / GTO | 25 | 25 | 0 | 0 | |
| Medium Earth / Molniya | 7 | 7 | 0 | 0 | |
| High Earth / Lunar transfer | 6 | 5 | 1 | 0 | |
| Heliocentric orbit / Planetary transfer | 3 | 3 | 0 | 0 | |
| Total | 261 | 254 | 7 | 1 | |

== Suborbital launch statistics ==
=== By country ===
For the purposes of this section, the yearly tally of suborbital launches by country assigns each flight to the country of origin of the rocket, not to the launch services provider or the spaceport. Flights intended to fly below 80 km (50 mi) are omitted.

1. Iran: 301 (81.6%)
2. United States: 33 (8.94%)
3. Canada: 11 (2.98%)
4. North Korea: 5 (1.36%)
5. Others: 19 (5.15%)

| Country | Launches | Successes | Failures | Partial failures |
|---|---|---|---|---|
| Brazil | 2 | 2 | 0 | 0 |
| Canada | 11 | 11 | 0 | 0 |
| China | 1 | 1 | 0 | 0 |
| Germany | 2 | 2 | 0 | 0 |
| India | 3 | 3 | 0 | 0 |
| Iran | 301 (Note: From the 2024 Iranian strikes in Israel.) | 301 | 0 | 0 |
| Japan | 1 | 1 | 0 | 0 |
| Netherlands | 1 | 0 | 0 | 1 |
| Oman | 1 | 1 | 0 | 0 |
| North Korea | 5 | 5 | 0 | 0 |
| Poland | 1 | 1 | 0 | 0 |
| Russia | 4 | 3 | 0 | 0 |
| United States | 33 | 32 | 1 | 0 |
| Yemen | 3 | 3 | 0 | 0 |
| World | 369 | 366 | 2 | 1 |

== Maiden orbital flights ==
| Rocket | Origin | Organization | Launch | Outcome | Ref. |
|---|---|---|---|---|---|
| Vulcan Centaur VC2S | United States | ULA | 8 January | Success | |
| Gravity-1 | China | Orienspace | 11 January | Success | |
| KAIROS | Japan | Space One | 13 March | Failure | |
| Long March 6C | China | CASC | 7 May | Success | |
| Angara A5 / Orion | Russia | Roscosmos | 11 April | Success | |
| New-type satellite carrier rocket | North Korea | NATA/Khrunichev | 27 May | Failure | |
| Ariane 62 | France | Arianespace | 9 July | Partial failure | |
| Zhuque-2E | China | LandSpace | 27 November | Success | |
| Long March 12 | China | CASC | 30 November | Success | |
| Kuaizhou 1A Pro | China | CASIC | 4 December | Success | |
| Long March 5B / YZ-2 | China | CASC | 16 December | Success | |
