= Gwozdz =

Gwozdz, Gwóźdź, or Gwosdz is a Polish surname, which means a nail. Notable people with the surname include:

- Doug Gwosdz (born 1960), American baseball player
- Karol Gwóźdź (born 1987), Upper Silesian poet and musician
- Lawrence Gwozdz (born 1953), American classical saxophonist
- Simon Gwozdz (born 1991), Polish-Singaporean entrepreneur, founder and CEO of Equatorial Space Systems
