= Sirius Space Services =

French rocket manufacturing company

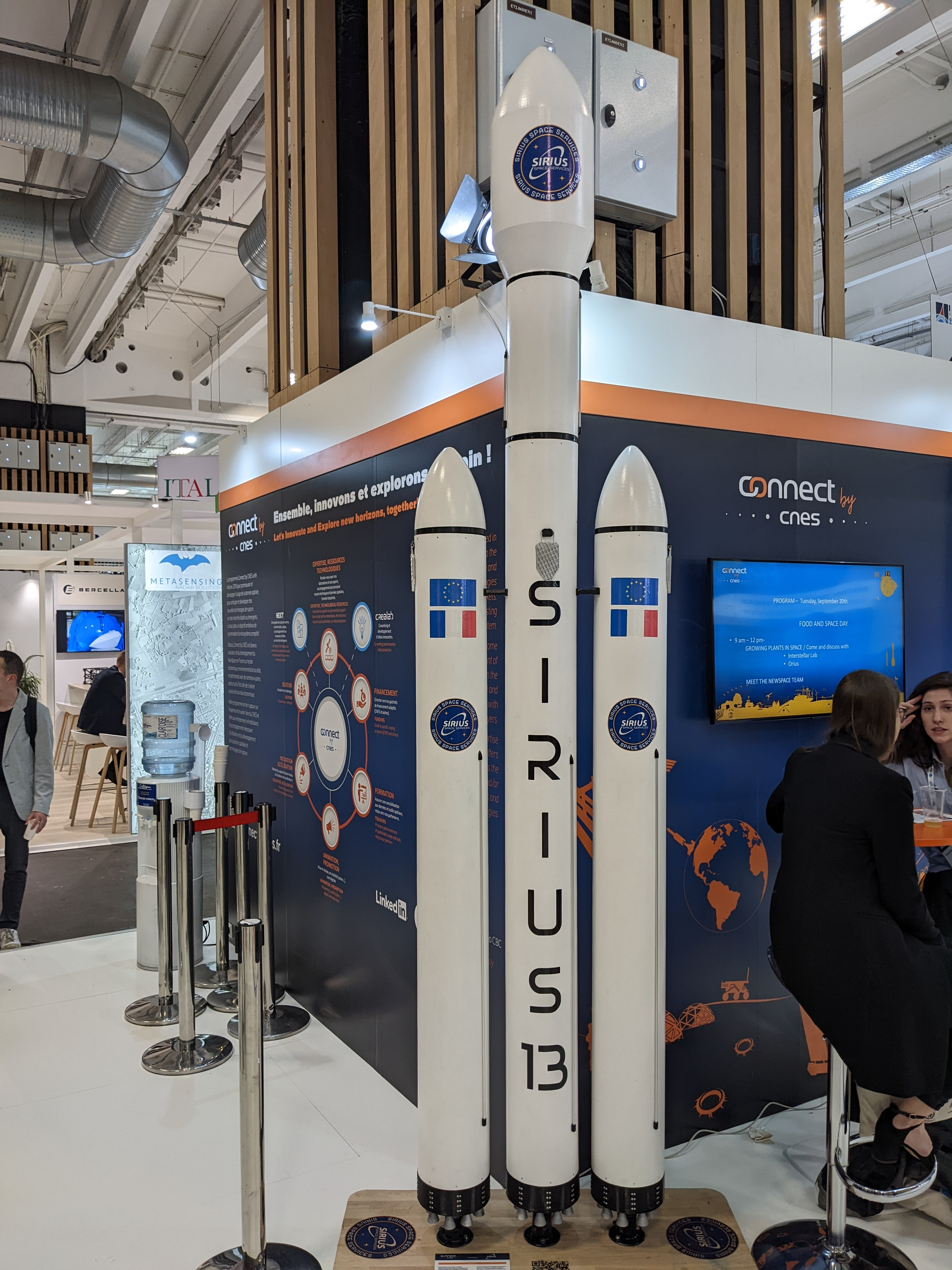
Model of Sirius 13

Sirius Space Services is a rocket manufacturing company from Paris, Ile-de-France, France, founded in 2020. The company is developing three aunch vehicles): Sirius 1, Sirius 13, Sirius 15, which use STAR-1 engine. The launch facilities will be Arnhem Space Centre and Guiana Space Centre.

== History ==
The company successfully test-fired a full prototype STAR-1 rocket engine for the first time in September 2026.
