= Lagrapo =

- Type: Private
- Industry: management consulting
- Founded: July 2022 in Chūō, Tokyo, Japan
- Founder: Muneyuki Takano
- Fate: Active
- Headquarters: Chūō, Tokyo, Japan
- Products: CubeSats
- Website: lagrapo.co.jp

Lagrapo is a Japanese management consulting firm providing assistance based on the management methodology of space programs. The company was founded by Muneyuki Takano, an aerospace engineer who previously worked at Mitsubishi Heavy Industries (MHI) and JAXA. The company is named after the Lagrange points, locations where the gravitational forces of two celestial bodies reach equilibrium, reflecting its aim to find a point of balance between space technology and the business world.

The company's first satellite, Ishiki was launched on the second flight of Space One's KAIROS rocket in December 2024 but was destroyed when the launch was terminated prematurely.

== History ==
Lagrapo was founded by Muneyuki Takano in 2022. Takano previously worked at MHI and took part in designing and launching the H-IIA rocket, and at JAXA where he participated in the development of the H-II Transfer Vehicle.

In June 2024, the company organized a tour for children residing in mainland Kagoshima Prefecture to visit Tanegashima and witness the third launch of the Japanese space agency JAXA's H3 Launch Vehicle, carrying the ALOS-4 satellite. As the launch was delayed by a day due to unfavorable weather conditions, the tour could not witness the launch itself but nevertheless visited the Tanegashima Space Center.

== Lagrapo satellite project ==
The Lagrapo satellite project is an initiative by Lagrapo to grant people who generally have not participated in space engineering an opportunity to be involved in developing satellites, and aims to educate the next generation of aerospace engineers. The Ishiki satellite, developed by high school students in Hiroo Gakuen was the first step in this project.

For Ishiki, Lagrapo was responsible for the planning, satellite manufacturing, launch service procurement, and fund raising. Orbital Engineering Inc. provided technical assistance in the designing, manufacturing, and testing of the satellite. The satellite was developed in about a year. While in orbit, Ishiki was to deploy a figure of Santa Claus on his sled, along with illuminating light-emitting diodes (LEDs) to enable ground observation of the satellite. The words "Dare Mighty Things." and "Let's make it to space this time." were written on the satellite.

On 31 October 2024, the company announced that Ishiki will be launched on the second flight of Space One's KAIROS rocket. Ishiki was launched on 18 December 2024 but did not reach orbit as the launch was terminated inflight.

== See also ==
- Private spaceflight
