= Artificial satellites in retrograde orbit =

Artificial satellites in low inclination orbits are rarely placed in retrograde orbit. This is partly due to the extra velocity (and propellant) required to launch into orbit against the direction of the Earth's rotation.

Most commercial Earth-observing satellites use retrograde Sun-synchronous orbits to ensure that observations are performed at the same local time each pass of any given location, while almost all communication satellites use prograde orbits.

== Examples ==
Israel has successfully launched seven Ofeq satellites in retrograde orbit aboard a Shavit launcher. These reconnaissance satellites complete one Earth orbit every 90 minutes and initially make about six daylight passes per day over Israel and the surrounding countries, though this optimal Sun-synchronized orbit degrades after several months. They were launched in retrograde orbit so that launch debris would land in the Mediterranean Sea, and not on populated neighboring countries on an eastward flight path.

The United States launched two Future Imagery Architecture (FIA) radar satellites into 122° inclined retrograde orbits in 2010 and 2012. The use of a retrograde orbit suggest that these satellites use synthetic aperture radar.

Earth-observing satellites may also be launched into a Sun-synchronous orbit, which is slightly retrograde. This is typically done in order to keep a constant surface illumination angle, which is useful for observations in the visible or infrared spectrum's. SEASAT and ERS-1 are examples of satellites launched into Sun-synchronous orbits for this reason.

== Space warfare and accidents ==
Arthur C. Clarke wrote an article called "War and Peace in the Space Age", in which he suggested that an artificial satellite in retrograde orbit could use "a bucket of nails" to destroy a Strategic Defense Initiative (anti-warhead) satellite. This premise was questioned on account of the vastness of space and the low probability of an encounter.

Nevertheless, a satellite in retrograde orbit could pose a major hazard to other satellites, especially if it were placed in the Clarke belt, where geostationary satellites orbit. This risk highlights the fragility of communication satellites and the importance of international cooperation in preventing space collisions due to negligence or malice.

== See also ==
- Satellite
- Shavit
- Anti-satellite weapon
- USA 205 – an example of a retrograde satellite

== Sources and external links ==
- Notes on Arthur C. Clarke
