= Space One KAIROS =

Japanese private small-lift orbital rocket

KAIROS (Kii-based Advanced & Instant Rocket System)
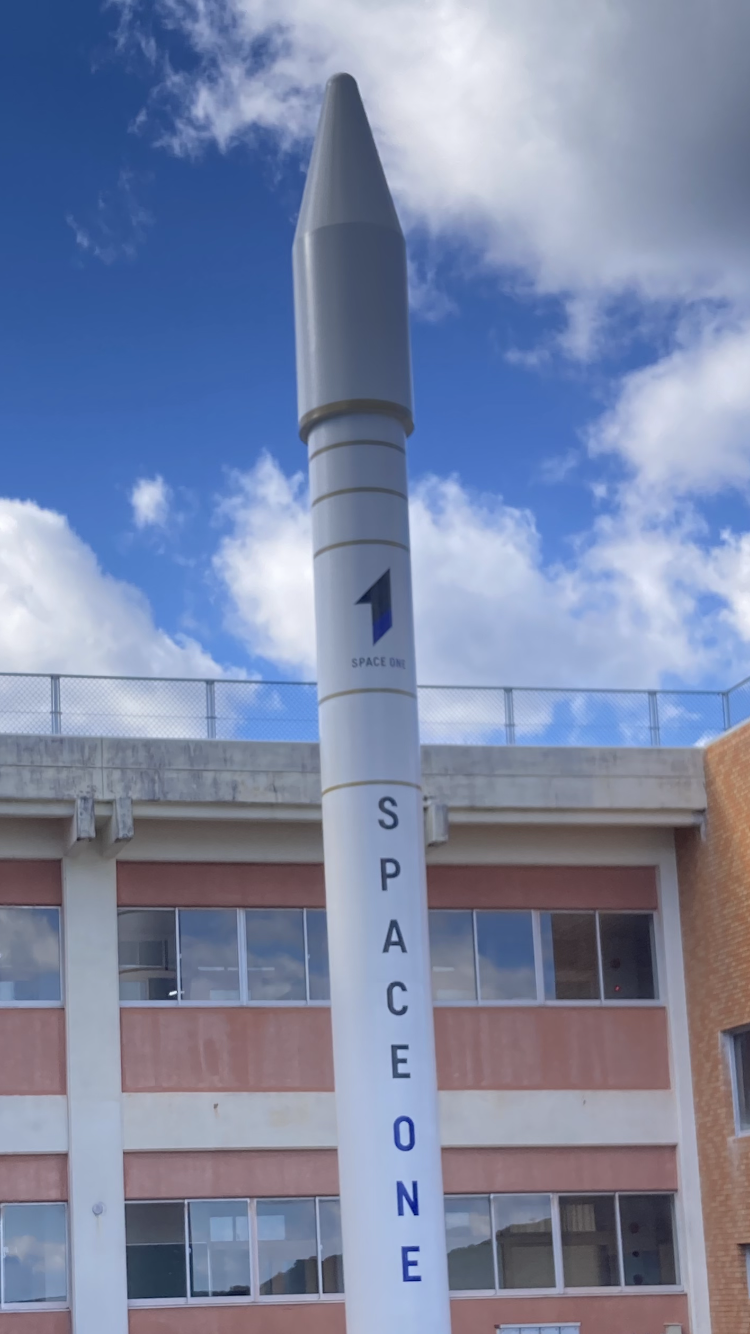
- Function: Launch vehicle
- Manufacturer: Space One
- Country of origin: Japan

Size
- Height: 18 m (59 ft)
- Diameter: 1.35 m (4 ft 5 in)
- Mass: 23,000 kg (51,000 lb)
- Stages: 4

Capacity

Payload to LEO
- Altitude: 500 km (310 mi)
- Orbital inclination: 33°
- Mass: 250 kg (550 lb)

Payload to SSO
- Altitude: 500 km (310 mi)
- Orbital inclination: 97°
- Mass: 150 kg (330 lb)

Associated rockets
- Comparable: Minotaur I Pegasus; Electron; Ceres-1

Launch history
- Status: In development
- Launch sites: Spaceport Kii
- Total launches: 3
- Success(es): 0
- Failure: 3
- First flight: 13 March 2024
- Last flight: 5 March 2026

The KAIROS rocket (カイロスロケット), or Kii-based Advanced & Instant Rocket System, is a Japanese solid-fuel rocket designed to launch small satellites of mass up to 250 kg to low Earth orbit and up to 150 kg to sun-synchronous orbit by the private spaceflight company Space One. It consists of three solid fuel powered stages and a liquid propellant upper stage.

== Namesake ==
The namesake of the KAIROS rocket is the Greek word Kairos, which means the subjective 'right time' as contrasted with Chronos which is the objective clock time. Kairos is also an alternate spelling of the name of Caerus, the Greek deity of luck and opportunity.

== Manufacture ==
IHI Aerospace manufactures the KAIROS rocket at Tomioka Plant in the city of Tomioka, Gunma Prefecture.

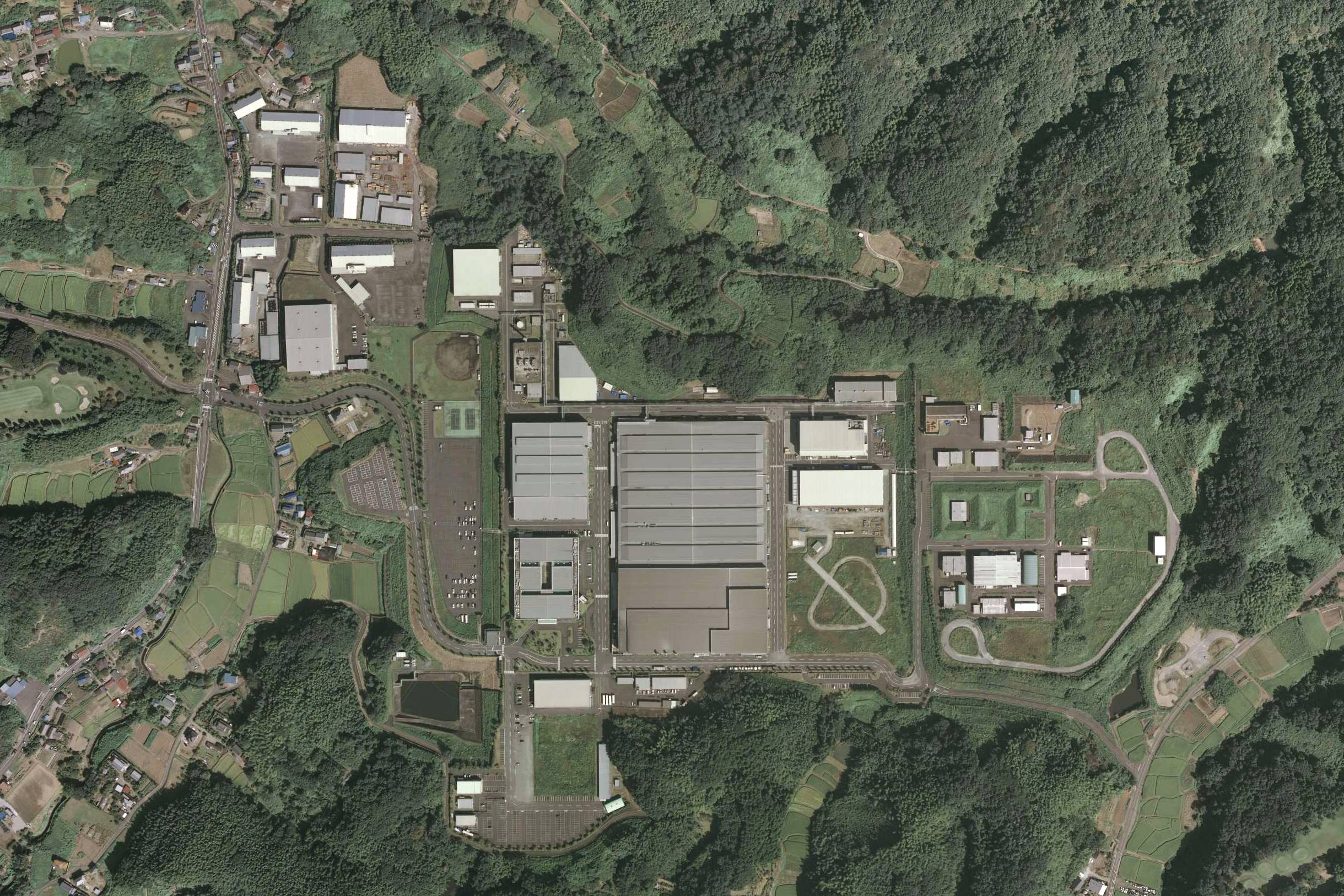
IHI Aerospace Tomioka Plant (Geospatial Information Authority of Japan)

== Launches ==
=== Launch site ===
Launches are planned from Spaceport Kii in Kushimoto, Wakayama, Japan, a dedicated launch site built by Shimizu Corporation. This spaceport is accessible from Tokyo International Airport (Haneda Airport) via Nanki–Shirahama Airport in approximately 2 hours and 20 minutes, and from Kansai International Airport in approximately 2 hours and 30 minutes.

=== First launch ===
The first launch was planned on 9 March 2024 but was postponed because a ship was spotted in the "maritime warning area" set up in waters near the launch pad. The launch eventually took place on 13 March 2024, but the vehicle exploded five seconds after liftoff. The remains of the rocket and payload fell close to the launch pad, but no substantial damage was found. Space One announced several hours later that the autonomous flight termination system could have activated and ended the mission. On 25 August 2024, the company's director confirmed that a destruct command was issued on the rocket. The AFTS detected a speed and level of thrust on the first stage that was lower than was modeled. Because this was the first rocket launch in Japan that used a flight safety system capable of intervening in a launch without human involvement, the destruct criteria were set to be particularly conservative.

=== Second flight ===
The second flight took place on 18 December 2024, which was canceled because of a failed rocket shortly after launch. The mission was planned to carry five satellites, including four CubeSats and one microsatellite. These satellites include payloads developed by Taiwan Space Agency, Space Cubics LLC, Terra Space Inc. and Lagrapo, as well as an additional satellite owned by an unnamed customer. The rocket began tumbling during first stage burn. The flight was terminated some time after.

=== Third flight ===
The third flight of KAIROS took place on March 4, 2026, lifting off from Spaceport Kii at 9:10pm but was also unsuccessful with flight termination measures being implemented at around 70 seconds after liftoff. With this third failure the commercial viability of Space One was thrown into doubt as Japan seeks to increase its domestic launch industry.

== List of launches ==
| Flight | Date (UTC) | Payload(s) | Outcome | Remarks |
|---|---|---|---|---|
| 1 | 13 March 2024, 02:01:12 | Rapid Launch Small Satellite | Failure | Vehicle automatically destroyed by its Flight Termination System at T+5 seconds, owing to lower vehicle thrust and speed than intended. |
| 2 | 18 December 2024, 02:00:00 | TATARA-1; PARUS-T1A; SC-Sat1; ISHIKI | Failure | Carried four CubeSats and one microsatellite. Rocket tumbling was observed at T+95 seconds. Vehicle lost attitude control around the time of first stage separation. |
| 3 | 5 March 2026, 02:10:00 | TATARA-1R; SC-Sat1a; HErO; AETS-1; Nutsat-3 | Failure | Carried four CubeSats and a microsatellite. At three minutes into the flight at an altitude of 100 kilometers the flight termination system engaged due to performance anomalies. |

== See also ==
- Interstellar Technologies, another private orbital launch services provider developing orbital launch vehicles in Japan
- Comparison of orbital launcher families
- Comparison of orbital launch systems
