= Arnhem Space Centre =

Spaceport in the Northern Territory, Australia

Coordinates: 12°22′53″S 136°48′50″E

- Abbreviation: ASC
- Type: Commercial spaceport
- Location: East Arnhem Land, Northern Territory, Australia
- Owner: Equatorial Launch Australia
- Website: ela.space/arnhem-space-centre/

The Arnhem Space Centre is a commercial spaceport near Nhulunbuy, in Arnhem Land, Australia founded by Scott Wallis in 2015, as part of the founding team. The founding team secured a contract to bring NASA to Australia, a lease with the Gumatj and met all licensing requirements for a launch to take place. The facility was managed by build for purpose company Equatorial Launch Australia. The Arnhem Space Centre was the site of NASA's first non-orbital sounding rocket launch from a commercial spaceport outside the United States, which took place on 27 June 2022. After the initial set of launches, there were plans for other private companies to use the site, but operations stalled in 2024 due to lack of consultation on the part of ELA with the Northern Land Council.

== Background ==
The Arnhem Space Centre project took over six years to develop, and the small founding team worked from Canberra to obtain a lease, sign the NASA contract and design the site. It was announced publicly in 2019. The location near the Equator allows launches to be conducted cheaper and quicker than alternatives.

== Description ==
The spaceport is located near Nhulunbuy, a township on the Gove Peninsula in north-east Arnhem Land, in the Northern Territory. The ASC was managed by Equatorial Launch Australia (ELA), which has its head office in Adelaide, South Australia.

Arnhem Space Centre was equipped to launch both sub-orbital flights and small orbital flights. The site's location, only 12 degrees south of the equator, is preferable for orbital rockets launching east, as extra speed is provided due to the spin of Earth. It is the first commercial spaceport in Australia, and as of July 2022 the only one.

== Launches ==
On 26 June 2022, the American space agency NASA used the site for its first launch from a commercial port outside the United States. The rocket was a Black Brant IX carrying an X-ray Quantum Calorimeter (XQC) instrument for UW–Madison for the purpose of X-ray astronomy for a brief period ( 5-20 min) in space. The mission was a suborbital flight with apogee of 203 mi (327 km). It was the first launch of a suborbital sounding rocket from Arnhem Space Centre in north-east Arnhem Land. The mission was successful.

A second launch was scheduled for 4 July but was delayed until 6 July 11:17pm ACST due to weather conditions. The spacecraft, named Sistine III, was sent by NASA to investigate the properties of astronomical transits of nearby exoplanets.

The third launch took place on 11 July 2022 at 8:31pm ACST, carrying the fourth DEUCE mission, intended by NASA to investigate and analyze the Alpha Centauri star system's ultraviolet spectrum.

== Further plans and cessation ==
After the initial series of launches, ELA announced it would not be continuing its lease and would attempt to build its own facility in Weipa, citing that they were unable to secure a deal with the Northern Land Council in a timely fashion. Council leader Yuseph Deen stated that ELA followed "less than satisfactory conduct". ELA later relocated to a new site near the town of Weipa in Queensland.

== See also ==
- Australian Space Agency
- Abbot Point Launch Site
- Koonibba Test Range
- Whalers Way Orbital Launch Complex
- Woomera Launch Area 5
