= Equatorial Space Systems =

Singaporean private space company

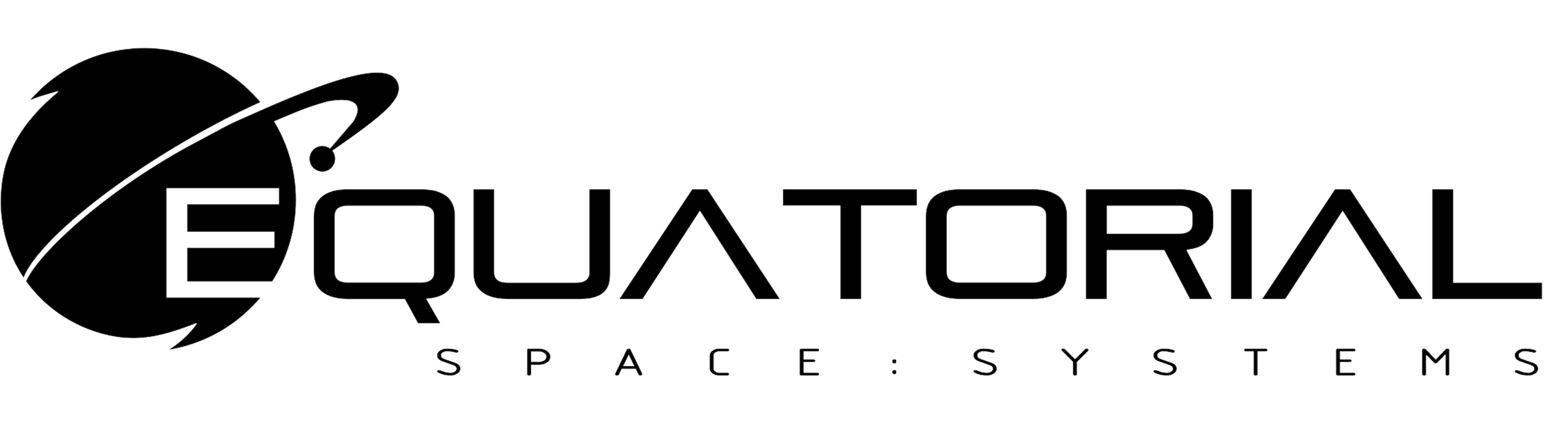

- Low Altitude Demonstrator on launch rail in Perak, Malaysia in 2020
- Company type: Private
- Industry: Launch service provider; Propulsion Manufacturer
- Founded: 2017; 9 years ago in Singapore.
- Founder: Simon Gwozdz; Praveen Ganapathi Perumal
- Headquarters: Singapore
- Key people: Simon Gwozdz (CEO); James Anderson (CTO); Praveen Ganapathi Perumal (COO)
- Products: Volans launch vehicle; Dorado sounding rocket; Student Payload Academic Rocket Kit; HRF-1 Hybrid rocket fuel
- Website: equatorialspace.com

Equatorial Space Systems PTE LTD. also known as Equatorial Space, is a Singapore-based company that develops hybrid-engine rockets and space launch services. The company was founded by Simon Gwozdz and Praveen Ganapathi Perumal in 2017 in Singapore, with the goal to develop low-cost, safe and eco-friendly space launch vehicles.

== History ==
Equatorial Space Industries(ESI) was founded in October 2017 by Simon Gwozdz and Praveen Ganapathi Perumal with incubation space secured in December 2017 at The Hangar by National University of Singapore Enterprise.

About a year after ESI was founded, in October 2018, ESI Wins Mohammad Bin Rashid Innovation Cup in Dubai.

James Anderson joins ESI as new CTO in August 2019.

ESI conducts the first hybrid engine static test firing with HRF-1AL solid fuel in October 2019.

In April 2020, ESI reformed and rebranded as Equatorial Space Systems(ESS) and conducted the first commercial non-solid launch from South East Asia in December 2020.

In October 2021, ESS Qualifies for Q Station Accelerator in New Mexico.

In January 2022, ESS Qualifies for the TechStars Accelerator in Los Angeles.

== Launch vehicles ==
=== Low Altitude Demonstration (LAD) ===
The 2.4 meter tall, 22-kilogram LAD (Low Altitude Demonstrator) rocket was designed as a flight test for ESS' HRF-1 solid fuel formulation, which is a development of the company's Chief Technology Officer Jamie Anderson.

The LAD rocket was successfully launched to an altitude of 1,200 meters, at 11:40am MYT on Monday the 21st of December 2020. The launch which took place at the Felcra Palm Oil Estate in Perak, Malaysia, is the first cross border collaboration involving a privately developed rocket with hybrid propulsion in the South East Asia region.

=== Dorado ===
Dorado is a suborbital sounding rocket with a diameter of 310 mm, and will have a single and dual stage version capable of delivering a 25-kilogram payload to 105 and 270 kilometers respectively. Dorado's hybrid rocket motor and pyrotechnic free payload separation are unique features, and its first launch was targeted for 2024. No further updates on the status of the project have been provided.

=== Volans ===
Volans is a small satellite launch vehicle, designed to be modular and deliver 60 to 500 kg to LEO. Its maiden flight was expected to be no earlier than 2024. Volans is 2 meters wide and stands 12–30 m tall and is planned to become a reusable launch vehicle with a unique recovery method, instead of propulsive landings like the Falcon 9, it plans to use rotating blades to perform a controlled landing at sea.

== Technology ==
=== Engine development ===
ESS began testing their hybrid rocket motors in October 2019 with a 7-second test fire of their LAD Hybrid Rocket Motor.

ESS became the first private enterprise to launch a commercial and non-solid rocket in Southeast Asia on 21 December 2020.

ESS conducted a 6-second test fire of their HRF1-AL Sub Scale motor in March 2022. A full scale rocket motor would be used for the Dorado sounding rocket.

ESS plans to develop a large hybrid rocket motor called the H700 motor for its Volans orbital rocket in 2024. Testing of a full scale rocket motor is planned to occur next year. The H700 motor will feature "an innovative delivery pump" called the eRAVEN which will increase oxidizer supply pressure to improve engine performance.

ESS’s website also states that a larger H1800 hybrid motor will be developed in 2025, providing 2MN of thrust.

According to the company's website, Volans will feature a "unique restartable hybrid third stage", allowing for accurate orbital insertion, as well as multi-payload deployment due to the restartable engine.

== Funding ==
In March 2023, ESS announced $1.5 million had been raised by Elev8.VC, Seeds Capital, and Masik Enterprises to fund the development of the Dorado rocket.
