= Space One =

Japanese rocket company

SPACE ONE CO., LTD.
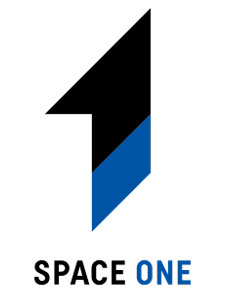
- Native name: スペースワン株式会社
- Company type: Private KK
- Industry: Space industry
- Predecessor: New Generation Small Rocket Development Planning Co., Ltd.
- Founded: 19 July 2017; 8 years ago (de jure); 2 July 2018; 7 years ago (de facto)
- Headquarters: Landmark Shibakoen 6F, 1-2-6 Shibakoen, Minato-ku, Tokyo; 105-0011 Japan
- Number of locations: Tokyo Office; Spaceport Kii
- Area served: Japan
- Key people: Masakazu Toyoda (President)
- Products: Launch vehicles
- Services: Commercial space transportation services
- Owner: Canon Electronics; IHI Aerospace; Shimizu Corporation; Development Bank of Japan; Kiyo Bank; K4 Ventures; Taiyo Group; MUFG Bank; Azuma House; Okuwa
- Website: www.space-one.co.jp

SPACE ONE CO., LTD. (Japanese: スペースワン株式会社, Hepburn: Supēsuwan Kabushikigaisha; Corporate Number: 8010401132607), or Space One (スペースワン), is a Japanese aerospace manufacturer, orbital launch service provider, and spaceport operator. It is a private spaceflight company developing and operating the KAIROS orbital launch vehicle for small satellite launches; KAIROS flew its unsuccessful maiden flight in March 2024. The company was founded by investments from Canon Electronics (a listed subsidiary of Canon), IHI Aerospace (a subsidiary of IHI Corporation), Shimizu Corporation and the Development Bank of Japan in July 2018.

== Rockets ==
The namesake of the KAIROS rocket, or Kii-based Advanced & Instant Rocket System, is the Greek word Kairos, which means 'time' and is also an alternate spelling of the name of Caerus, the Greek deity of luck and opportunity.

== Launch site ==
Shimizu Corporation constructed Space One's own launch site for KAIROS, named Spaceport Kii, as Japan's first-ever private sector spaceport, in Kushimoto, Wakayama, Japan between 2019 and 2021. The launch site provides access to various orbit inclinations.

This spaceport is accessible from Tokyo International Airport (Haneda Airport) via Nanki–Shirahama Airport in approximately 2 hours and 20 minutes, and from Kansai International Airport in approximately 2 hours and 30 minutes.

== Accidents and incidents ==
=== Inaugural flight ===
On March 13, 2024, the Kairos rocket exploded moments into its maiden voyage, aiming to become the first Japanese private company to deploy a satellite into orbit. The 59-foot solid-fueled rocket disintegrated shortly after liftoff from the Kii peninsula in western Japan, leaving behind debris and a cloud of smoke; there were no immediate reports of injuries.

=== Second flight ===
The second flight took place on 18 December 2024, which was canceled because of a failed rocket shortly after launch. The mission was planned to carry five satellites, including four CubeSats and one microsatellite. These satellites include payloads developed by Taiwan Space Agency, Space Cubics, Terra Space, and Lagrapo, as well as an additional satellite owned by an unnamed customer. The rocket began tumbling during 1st stage burn. The flight was terminated some time after.

=== Third flight ===
The third flight of KAIROS took place on March 4, 2026, lifting off from Spaceport Kii at 9:10 pm but was also unsuccessful with flight termination measures being implemented at around 70 seconds after liftoff. With this third failure the commercial viability of Space One was thrown into doubt as Japan seeks to increase its domestic launch industry.

== See also ==
- Interstellar Technologies, another private orbital launch services provider in Japan
- List of launch service providers
- List of private spaceflight companies
- List of spacecraft manufacturers
