= Spaceport Kii =

Commercial spaceport in Japan

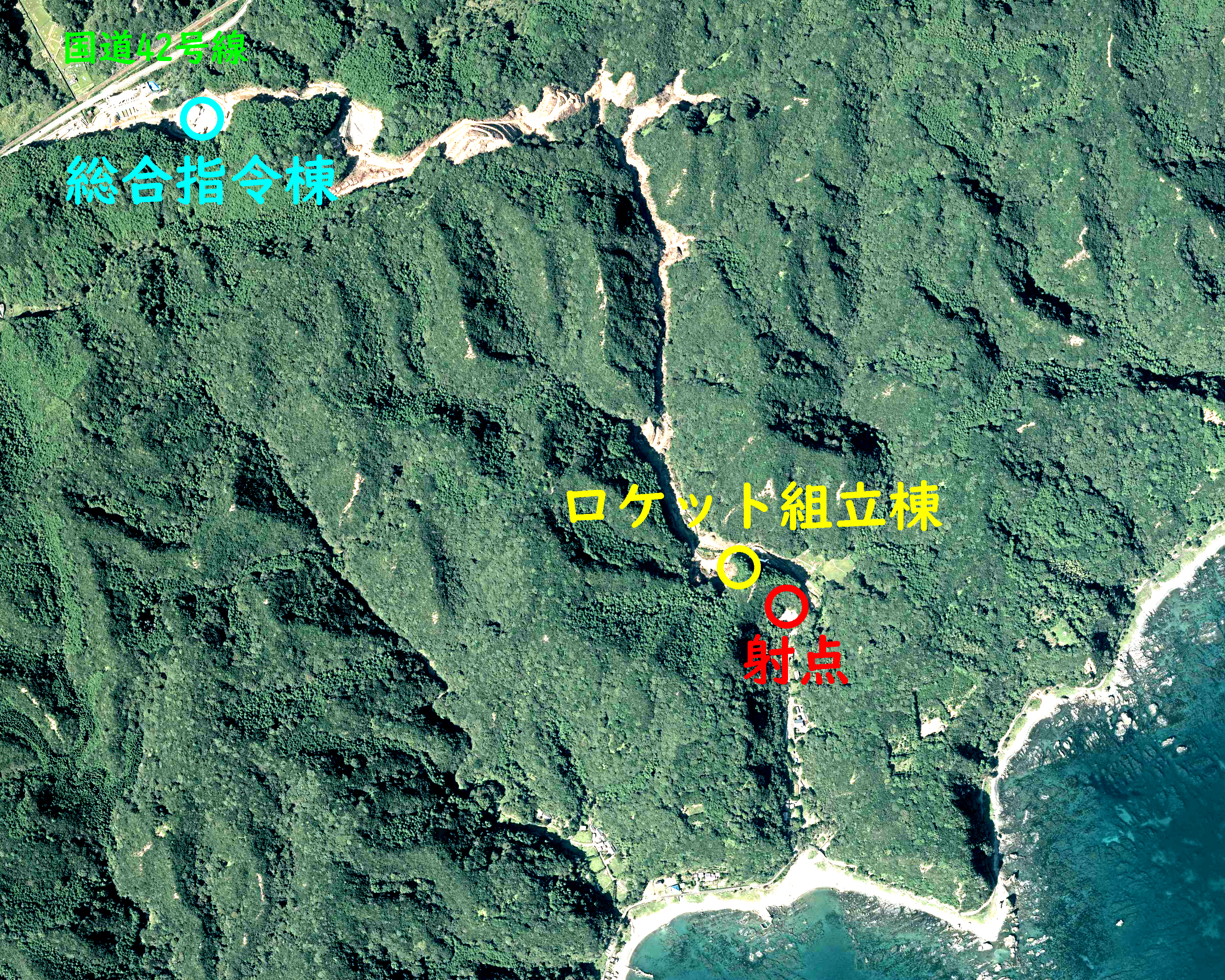
- Aerial photo of Spaceport Kii under construction (5 October 2019).
- Interactive map of Spaceport Kii
- Location: Kushimoto, Wakayama Prefecture, Japan
- Coordinates: 33.5443°N 135.8895°E
- Time zone: UTC+9 (JST)
- Operator: Space One
- Total launches: 3
- Launch pad: 1
Launch history
- Status: Active
- Launches: 3
- First launch: 13 March 2024
- Last launch: 5 March 2026
- Associated rockets: KAIROS

Spaceport Kii (Japanese: スペースポート紀伊; sometimes stylized as Space Port Kii) is a commercial spaceport located in Kushimoto, Wakayama Prefecture in Japan. Japan's first private spaceport, it is operated by Space One, who are using it to launch their solid-fuel rocket KAIROS. Three launch attempts have been made on the site, on 13 March and 17 December 2025 and on 4 March 2026, which all ended up being a failure.

== Location and construction ==
Spaceport Kii is located near the southernmost tip of Honshu and is only a two-minute (1.9 kilometer) drive from Kii-Uragami Station in Nachikatsuura.

The launch site was funded by several Japanese corporations, including Canon Inc., Shimizu Corporation (who also constructed the site), and IHI Corporation. Ground broke on 19 November 2019.

== Launches ==
The first launch attempt of the KAIROS rocket was scheduled on 8 March 2024, however it was delayed to the 13th due to a ship in too close of proximity. It launched on the 13th, but disintegrated just seconds later.

The second launch of KAIROS was initially scheduled for 14 December 2024, but was ultimately scrubbed twice to 18 Dec due to bad weather. The 2nd launch had a successful liftoff, but ultimately suffered a loss of control nearing the end of the first-stage burn and was terminated. Its third launch while carrying a small government test satellite, on 4 March 2026, also ended in failure. The flight was terminated two minutes after launch.

Space One has stated that it plans to have around 20 launches of KAIROS a year.
