= Brazilian Space Agency =

Space program agency of Brazil

- Agência Espacial Brasileira

Agency overview
- Abbreviation: AEB
- Formed: 10 February 1994
- Preceding agency: Brazilian space program (1961–1993)
- Type: Space agency
- Headquarters: Brasília, Distrito Federal
- Official language: Portuguese
- Administrator: Marco Antonio Chamon
- Primary spaceport: Alcântara Space Center
- Owner: Government of Brazil
- Annual budget: R$180 million / US$45 million (2019)
- Website: www.gov.br/aeb

The Brazilian Space Agency (Portuguese: Agência Espacial Brasileira; AEB) is the civilian authority in Brazil responsible for the country's space program. It operates a spaceport at Alcântara, and a rocket launch site at Barreira do Inferno. It is the largest and most prominent space agency in Latin America.

The Brazilian Space Agency is the institutional successor of Brazil's space program, which had been managed by the Brazilian military until its transfer to civilian control on 10 February 1994. It suffered a major setback in 2003, when a rocket explosion killed 21 technicians. Brazil successfully launched its first rocket into space, the VSB-30, on 23 October 2004 from the Alcântara Launch Center; several other successful launches have followed. Brazil was briefly a partner in the International Space Station, and in 2006, AEB astronaut Marcos Pontes became the first Brazilian and the first native Portuguese-speaker to go into space, when he arrived at the ISS for a week. During his trip, Pontes carried out eight experiments selected by the Brazilian Space Agency, including testing flight dynamics of saw blades in zero gravity environments. In June 2021, the AEB signed the Artemis Accords to the joint exploration of the Moon and Mars from 2024 as part of the Artemis program.

== History ==
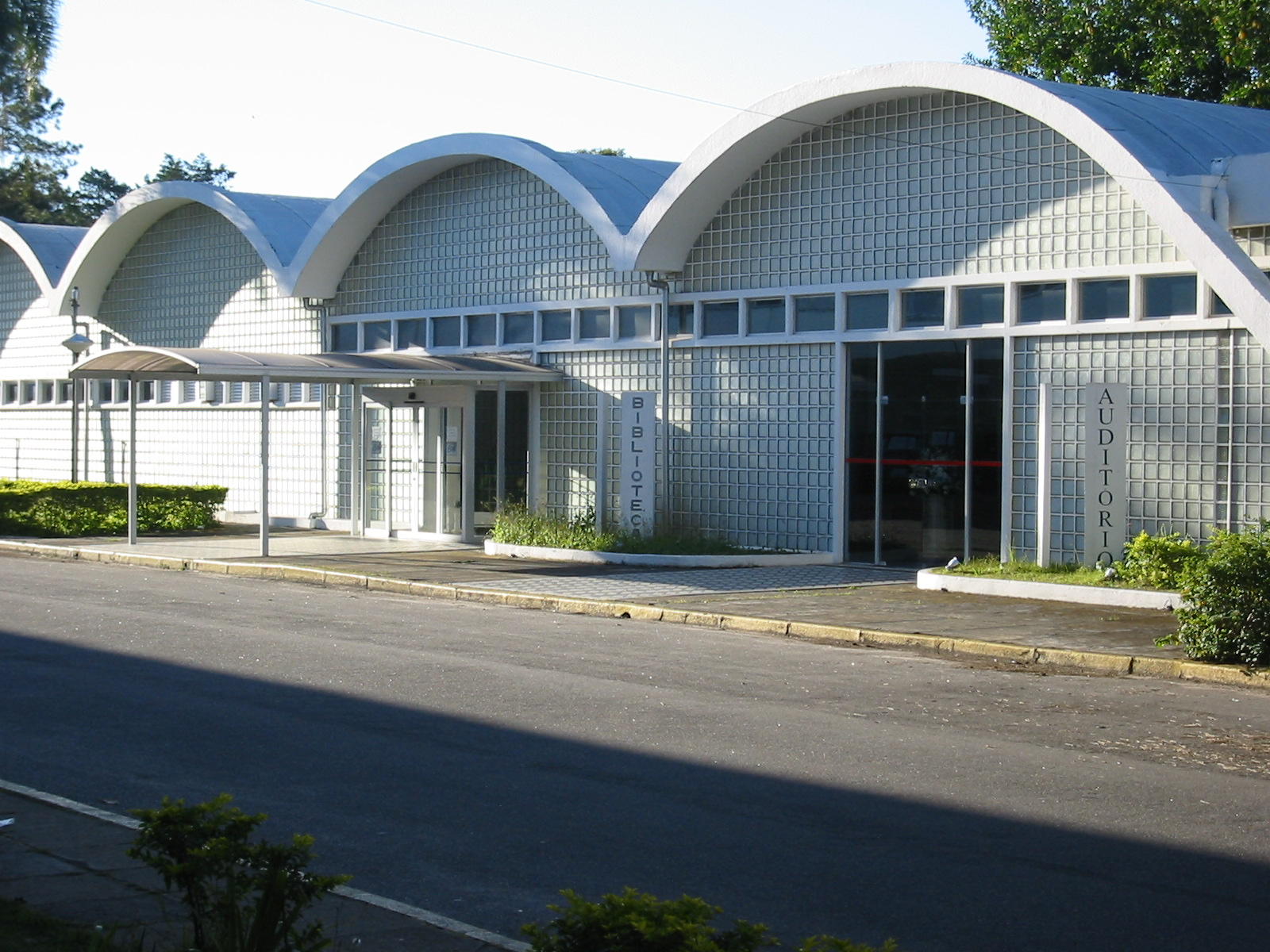
Technological Institute of Aeronautics (ITA).

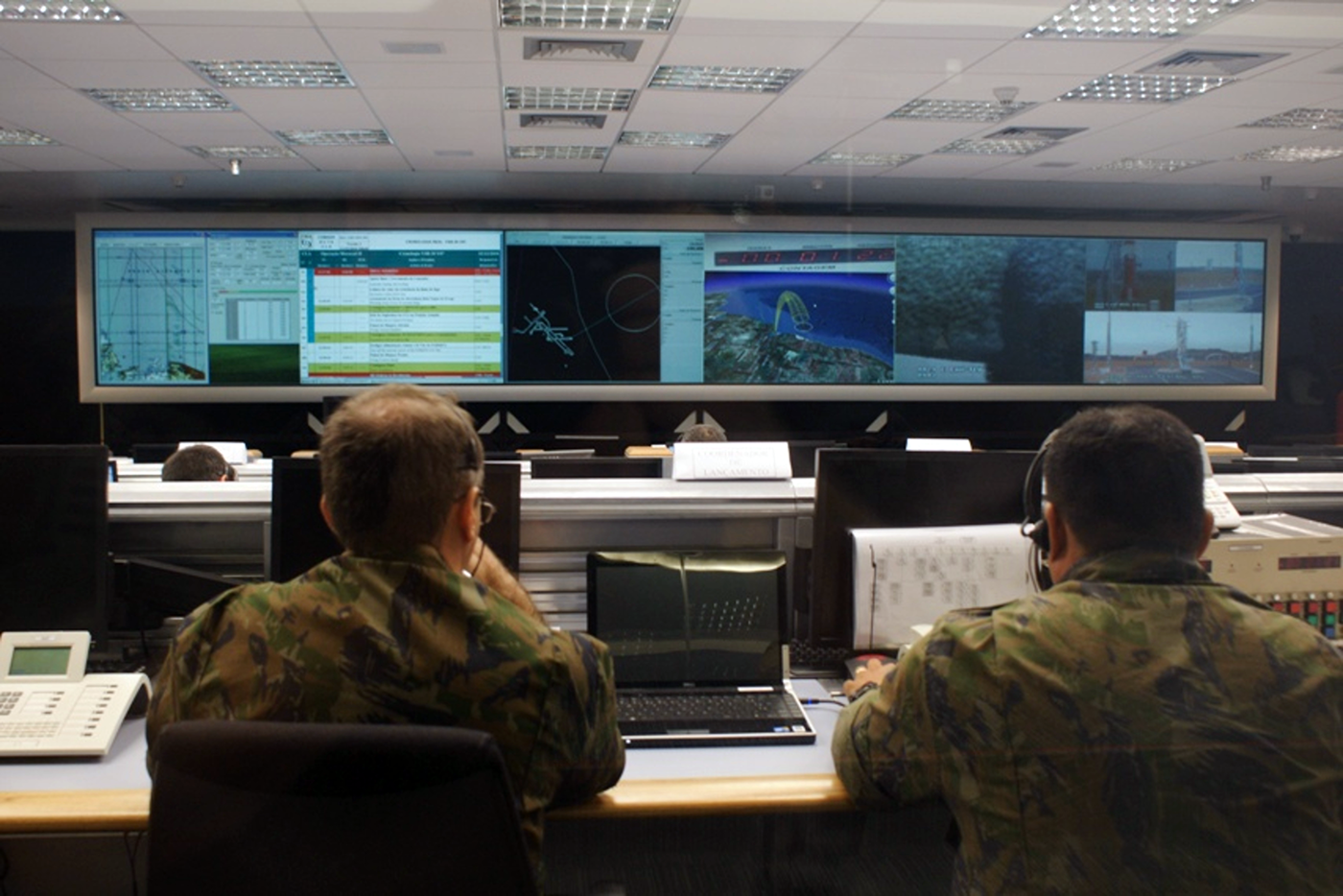
The Brazilian Space Agency's control room at the Alcântara Launch Center.

The then president Jânio Quadros in 1960 established a commission that elaborated a national program for the space exploration. As a result of this work, in August 1961, the Organization Group of the National Commission of Space Activities (Portuguese: Grupo de Organização da Comissão Nacional de Atividades Espaciais) was formed, operating in São José dos Campos, in the state of São Paulo. Its researchers participated in international projects in the areas of astronomy, geodesy, geomagnetism, and meteorology.

The GOCNAE was replaced in April 1971 by the Institute for Space Research, currently called the National Institute for Space Research (INPE). Since the creation of the then Technical Center of Aeronautics (CTA), the current Department of Aerospace Science and Technology (DCTA) of the Brazilian Air Force, in 1946, the country has been following the international progress in the aerospace sector.

With the creation of the Technological Institute of Aeronautics (ITA), a fully qualified institution was formed to train highly qualified human resources in areas of state-of-the-art technology. The DCTA, through the ITA and the Institute of Aeronautics and Space (IAE), play a key role in the consolidation of the Brazilian space program.

In the early 1970s, the Brazilian Space Activities Commission (COBAE) was created - a body linked to the then General Staff of the Armed Forces (EMFA) - to coordinate and monitor the implementation of the space program. This coordinating role, in February 1994, was transferred to the Brazilian Space Agency. The creation of the AEB represents a change in government orientation by establishing a central coordinating body for the space program, reporting directly to the Presidency of the Republic.

In 2011, Argentina's defense minister, Arturo Puricelli, made a proposal to the Brazilian minister, Celso Amorim, for the creation of a unified South American space agency by the year 2025, according to the European Space Agency.

In 2015, however, the Brazilian Space Agency and the Ministry of Defense rejected the Argentine proposal "because it understood that it would be an organ that would yield a lot of bureaucracy and few results like the 'confederation' proposed by the United States and never came to anything" and also because, according to the agency's adviser:

"A regional space agency would reverberate in the Brazilian pocket that, due to its territorial size, would end up getting most of the invoice to pay."

== Launch sites ==
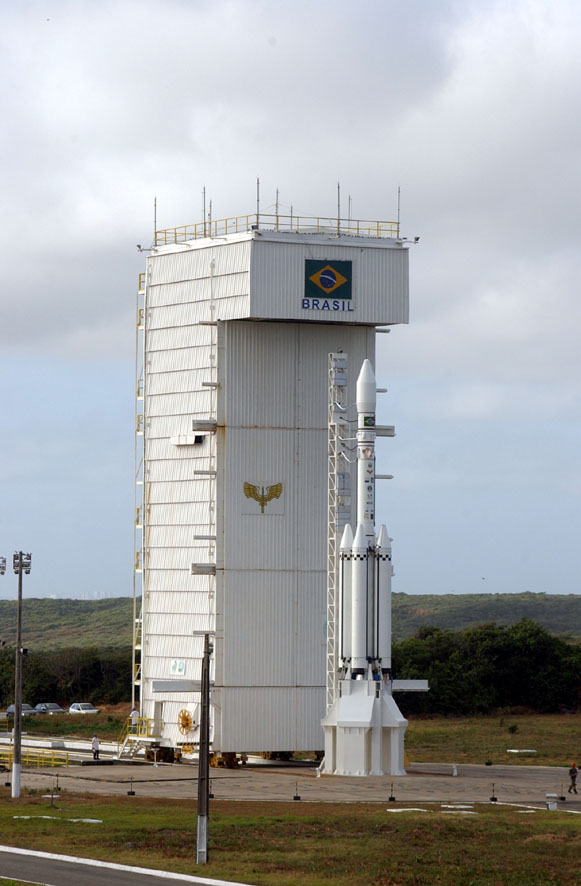
VLS1-V03 rocket on a launching pad from Alcântara Launch Center.

=== Alcântara Space Center ===
2°20′S 44°24′W

The Alcântara Launch Center (Portuguese: Centro de Lançamento de Alcântara; CLA) is the main launch site and operational center of the Brazilian Space Agency, located in the peninsula of Alcântara, in the state of Maranhão. The region meets the criteria of low population density, excellent security conditions, and ease of aerial and maritime access, but the most important factor is its closeness to the Equator, which gives Alcântara an innate advantage in the launching of geosynchronous satellites.

=== Barreira do Inferno Launch Center ===
5°55′30″S 35°9′47″W

The Barreira do Inferno Launch Center (Portuguese: Centro de Lançamento da Barreira do Inferno; CLBI) is a rocket launch base of the Brazilian Space Agency. It is located in the city of Parnamirim, in the state of Rio Grande do Norte. It is primarily used to launch sounding rockets and to support the Alcântara Launch Center.

== Launch vehicles ==
=== Sounding rockets ===
Brazilian sounding rockets

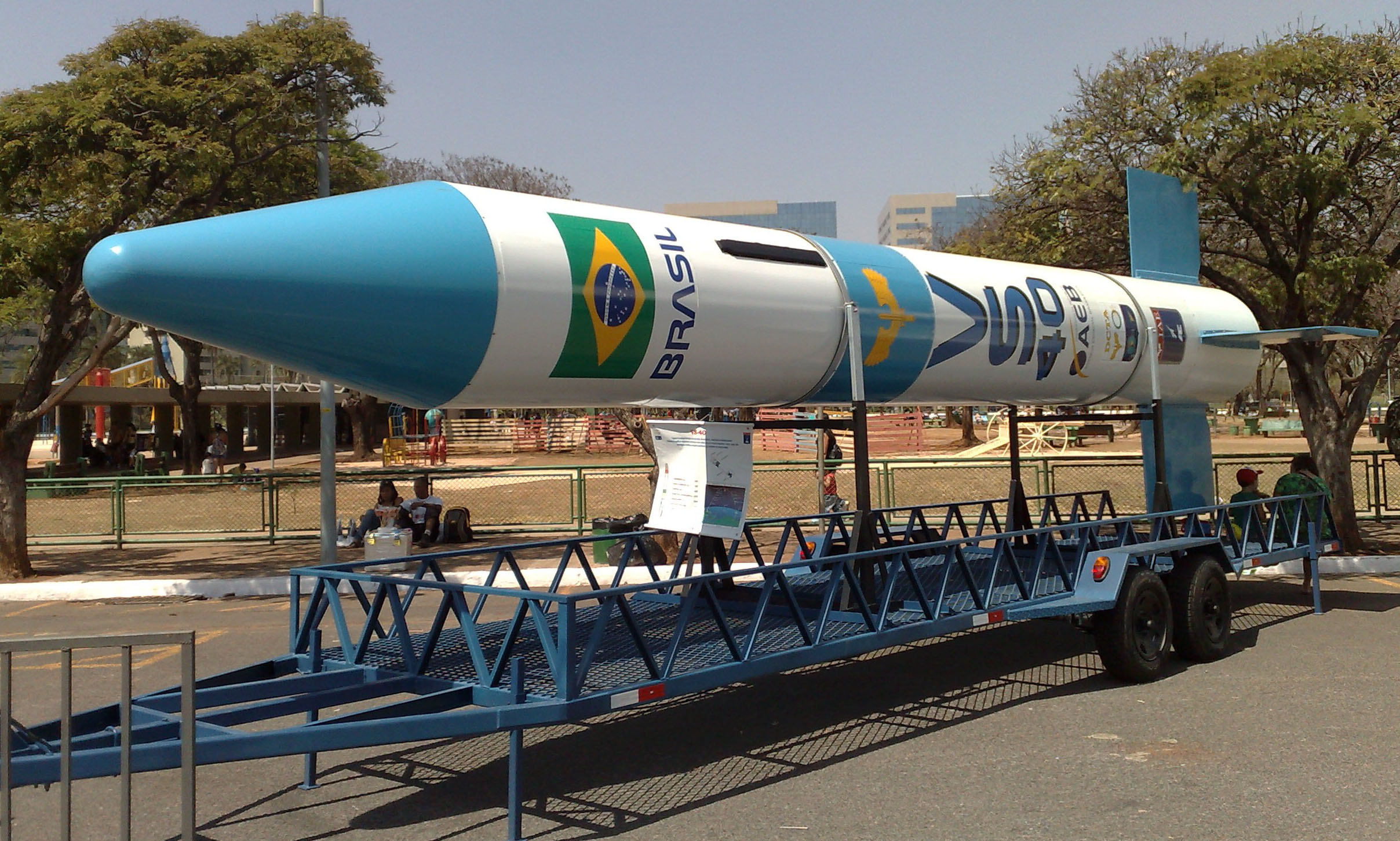
VS-40 rocket

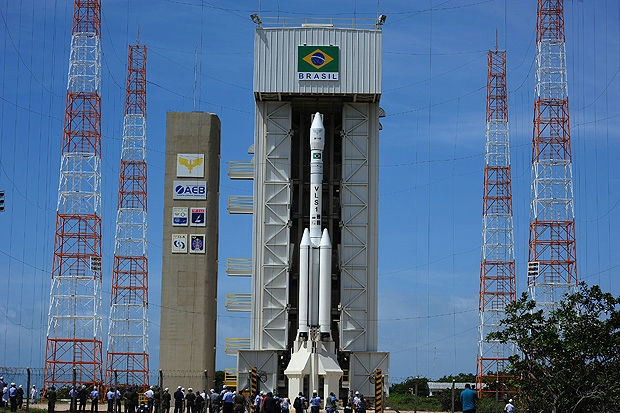
VLS-1 at the Alcântara Launch Center

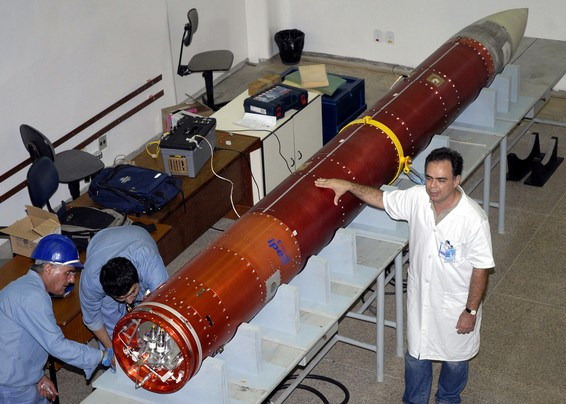
VSB-30, the Brazilian sub-orbital vehicle

The Brazilian Space Agency has operated a series of sounding rockets.

- Sonda I
- Sonda II
- Sonda III
- Sonda IV
- VSB-30
- VS-30
- VS-40
- VS-50 (projected, will use the new S-50 rocket engine)

=== VLM ===
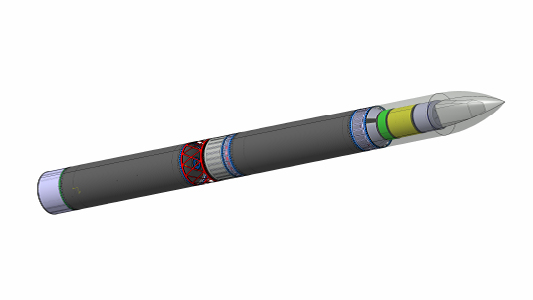
VLM, the future Brazilian three-stage satellite launcher

Brazil has forged a cooperative arrangement with Germany to develop a dedicated micro-satellite launch vehicle. As a result, the VLM "Veiculo Lançador de Microsatelites" (Microsatellite Launch Vehicle) based on the S50 rocket engine is being studied, with the objective of orbiting satellites up to 150 kg in circular orbits ranging from 250 to 700 km. The first qualifying and test flight will be on 2022 from the Alcântara Space Center. The second flight is scheduled for the following years as part of the SHEFEX mission, to be conducted also from Alcântara, in partnership with the German Aerospace Center (DLR).

=== VLS ===
The VLS - Satellite Launch Vehicle (Portuguese: Veículo Lançador de Satélites) was the Brazilian Space Agency's main satellite launch vehicle. It is a four-stage rocket composed of a core and four strap-on motors. The vehicle's first stage has four solid fuel motors derived from the Sonda sounding rockets. It is intended to deploy 100 to 380 kg satellites into 200 to 1200 km orbit, or to deploy 75 to 275 kg payloads into 200 to 1000 km polar orbit. The first 3 prototypes for the vehicle failed to launch, with the 3rd exploding on the launch pad in 2003 resulting in the deaths of 21 AEB personnel.

The VLS-1 V4 prototype was expected a launch in 2013. After subsequent delays, the project was cancelled in 2016.

==== Southern Cross program ====
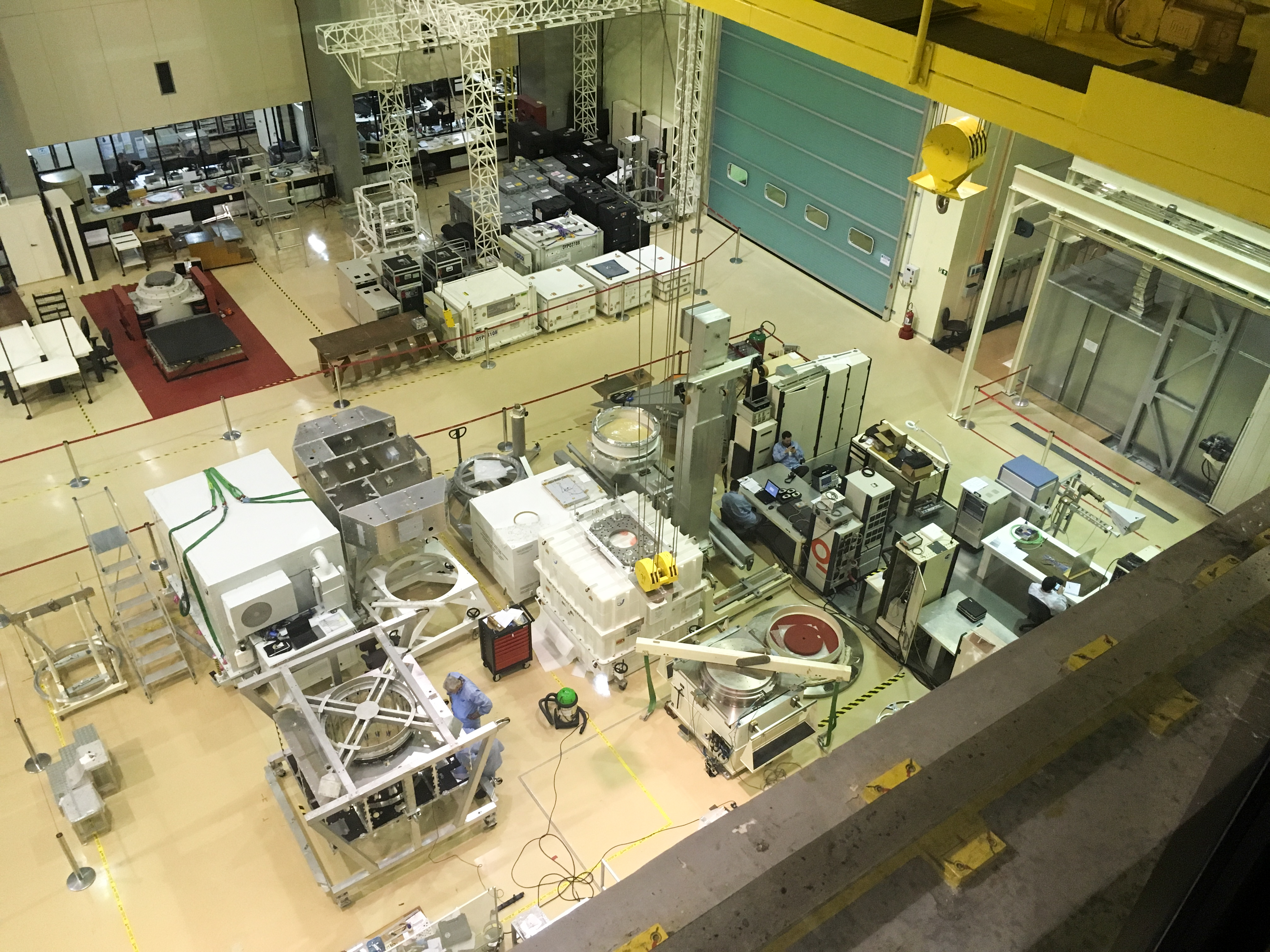
Part of the satellite testing facility at the National Institute for Space Research

The Brazilian Space Agency was developing a new family of launch vehicles in cooperation with the Russian Federal Space Agency. The five rockets of the Southern Cross family will be based on Russia's Angara vehicle and liquid-propellant engines.

The first stage of the VLS Gama, Delta and Epsilon rockets was to be powered by a unit based on the RD-191 engine. The second stage, which will be the same for all the Southern Cross rockets, will be driven by an engine based on the Molniya rocket. The third stage will be a solid-propellant booster based on an upgraded version of the VLS-1. The program was named "Southern Cross" in reference to the constellation Crux, present on the flag of Brazil and composed of five stars. Hence the names of the future launch vehicles:

- VLS Alfa (lightweight rocket)

The first rocket to be developed. As a direct modification of the VLS-1 of the original project, replacing the fourth and fifth stages by a single liquid fuel engine. It can place payloads in the range 200–400 kg in orbits up to 750 km.

- VLS Beta (lightweight rocket)

Consisting of three stages without auxiliary thrusters. The first stage is a solid fuel propellant 40 tons, the second will have 30 tons of thrust engine and the latter will be 7.5 tons of thrust, with the same mixture "Kerolox". It can place payloads up to 800 kg in orbits up to 800 km.

- VLS Gama (lightweight rocket)

The VLS Gama launcher is part of the lightweight class, but using the near-equatorial position of the Alcântara Launch Center, it can place almost 1 ton of payload into orbit up to 800 km.

- VLS Delta (medium-weight rocket)

The VLS Delta launcher is a medium-weight rocket and differs from the Gamma by having four solid-propellant boosters attached to the first stage. Its payload deliverable to a geostationary orbit is 2 tons.

- VLS Epsilon (heavy-weight rocket)

The VLS Epsilon launcher is a heavy-weight rocket with three identical units attached to the first stage. It can place a 4 tons spacecraft in geostationary orbit, if it is launched from Alcântara.

The Brazilian government was planning to allocate $1 billion dollars for the project over six years. It has already set aside $650 million for the construction of five launch pads able to handle up to 12 launches per year. The program was scheduled to be completed by 2022. However, it was cancelled by Brazilian President Dilma Rousseff. Instead, Brazil will focus on a series of smaller launch vehicles that appear to rely more on home-grown technology.

=== 14-X ===
Brazil is also investing in the domain of the hypersonic technology. The 14-X, a hypersonic glide vehicle (HGV) under development with the Brazilian Air Force, was conceived in 2007 and launched on 14 February 2022, by a VSB-30 rocket, reaching to 100,000 feet of altitude and a maximum speed of Mach 10.

== Engines ==
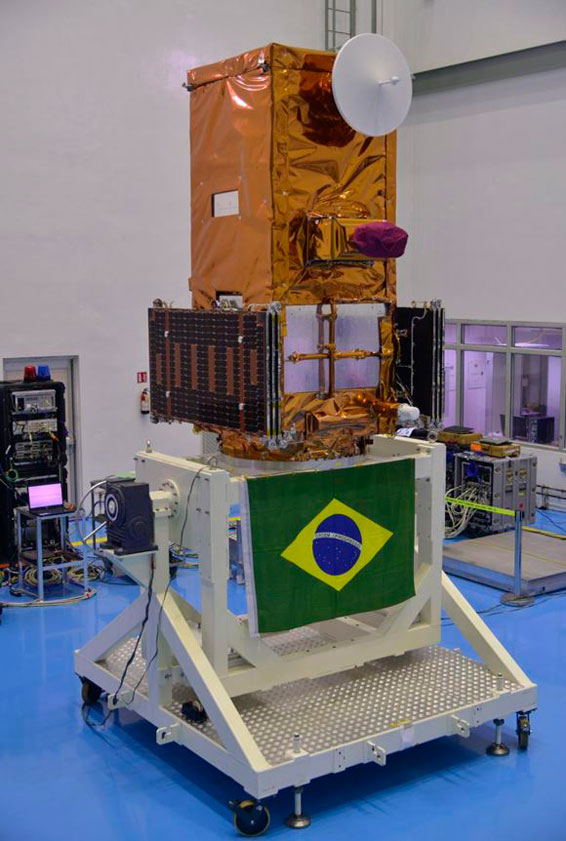
Brazilian multi-mission satellite Amazônia-1

A number of different engines were developed for usage on the several launch vehicles:

- S-10-1 solid rocket engine. Used on Sonda 1. Thrust: 27 kN.
- S-10-2 solid rocket engine. Used on Sonda 1. Thrust: 4.20 kN, burn time: 32 s.
- S-20 Avibras solid rocket engine. Used on Sonda 2 and Sonda 3. Thrust:36 kN
- S-23 Avibrassolid rocket engine. Used on Sonda 3M1. Thrust:18 kN
- S-30 IAE solid rocket engine. Used on Sonda 3, Sonda 3M1, Sonda 4, VS-30, VS-30/Orion and VSB-30. Thrust: 20.490 kN
- S-31 IAE solid rocket engine. Used on VSB-30. Thrust: 240 kN
- S-40TM IAE solid rocket engine. Used on VLS-R1, VS-40, VLS-1 and VLM-1. Thrust: 208.4 kN, isp=272s.
- S-43 IAE solid rocket engine. Used on Sonda 4, VLS-R1 and VLS-1. Thrust: 303 kN, isp=265s
- S-43TM IAE solid rocket engine. Used on VLS-R1, VLS-1 and VLM. Thrust: 321.7 kN, isp=276s
- S-44 IAE solid rocket engine. Used on VLS-R1, VS-40, VLS-1 and VLM-1. Thrust:33.24 kN, isp=282s
- L5 (Estágio Líquido Propulsivo (EPL)) liquid fuel rocket engine. Tested on VS-30 and projected for use on VLS-Alfa.
- L15 liquid fuel rocket engine. Projected for use on VS-15. Thrust: 15 kN
- L75 liquid fuel rocket engine, similar to the Russian RD-0109. Projected for use on VLS-Alfa, VLS-Beta, VLS-Omega, VLS-Gama and VLS-Epsilon. Thrust: 75 kN
- S-50 IAE solid rocket engine. Projected for use on VLM-1 and VS-50.
- L1500 liquid fuel rocket engine. Used on VLS-Beta, VLS-Omega, VLS-Gama and VLS-Epsilon. Thrust: 1500 kN

== Satellites ==
The Brazilian Space Agency has several active satellites in orbit including imagery intelligence, military communications, reconnaissance and Earth observation satellites. Several others are currently in development.

Brazilian Satellites
Satellite	Origin	Type	Operational	Status
SCD1	Brazil	Earth observation	1993–	Active
SCD2	Brazil	Earth observation	1998–	Active
CBERS-1	Brazil / China	Earth observation	1999–2003	Retired
CBERS-2	Brazil / China	Earth observation	2003–2007	Retired
CBERS-2B	Brazil / China	Reconnaissance	2007–2010	Retired
CBERS-3	Brazil / China	Earth observation	2013	Launch failure
CBERS-4	Brazil / China	Earth observation	2014–	Active
SGDC-1	Brazil	Communications satellite	2017–	Active
CBERS-4A	Brazil / China	Earth observation	2019–	Active
Amazônia-1	Brazil	PMM - "Plataforma Multimissão" (Multi-mission Platform)	2021–	Active
SGDC-2	Brazil	Communications satellite	2020s	Planned
SABIA-Mar 1	Brazil / Argentina	PMM - "Plataforma Multimissão" (Multi-mission Platform)	2020s	Planned
Amazônia-1B	Brazil	PMM - "Plataforma Multimissão" (Multi-mission Platform)	2020s	Planned
Amazônia-2	Brazil	PMM - "Plataforma Multimissão" (Multi-mission Platform)	2020s	Planned
GEOMET-1	Brazil	Earth observation	2020s	Planned
LATTES-1	Brazil / China / United States / Japan	Space weather (EQUARS) and X-ray space telescope (MIRAX) mission	2020s	Planned
SABIA-Mar 2	Brazil / Argentina	PMM - "Plataforma Multimissão" (Multi-mission Platform)	2020s	Planned
Carponis	Brazil	Remote sensing	2020s	Planned

== Human spaceflight ==
Marcos Pontes, a lieutenant colonel in the Brazilian Air Force, is an astronaut of the Brazilian Space Agency. Pontes was the first Brazilian astronaut, having launched with the Expedition 13 crew from the Baikonur Cosmodrome in Kazakhstan on March 29, 2006, aboard a Soyuz-TMA spacecraft. Pontes docked with the International Space Station (ISS) on March 31, 2006, where he lived and worked for 9 days. Pontes returned to Earth with the Expedition 12 crew, landing in Kazakhstan on April 8, 2006. In January 2019, Pontes was nominated by the Brazilian President Jair Bolsonaro as Minister of Science, Technology, Innovation and Communication, a position he held until 2022.

Name	Position	Time in space	Launch date	Mission	Mission insignia	Status
Marcos Pontes	Mission Specialist	9d 21h 17m	March 30, 2006	Soyuz TMA-8; Missão Centenário; Soyuz TMA-7		Active, on stand-by

== Brazilian aerospace command ==
The Aerospace Operations Command (Portuguese: Comando de Operações Aeroespaciais - COMAE) is a Brazilian air and space command created in 2017 which is part of the Brazilian Air Force. The command is responsible for planning, coordinating, executing and controlling the country's air and space operations. The Brazilian Navy and Brazilian Army also are part of the organization.

== Space operations center ==
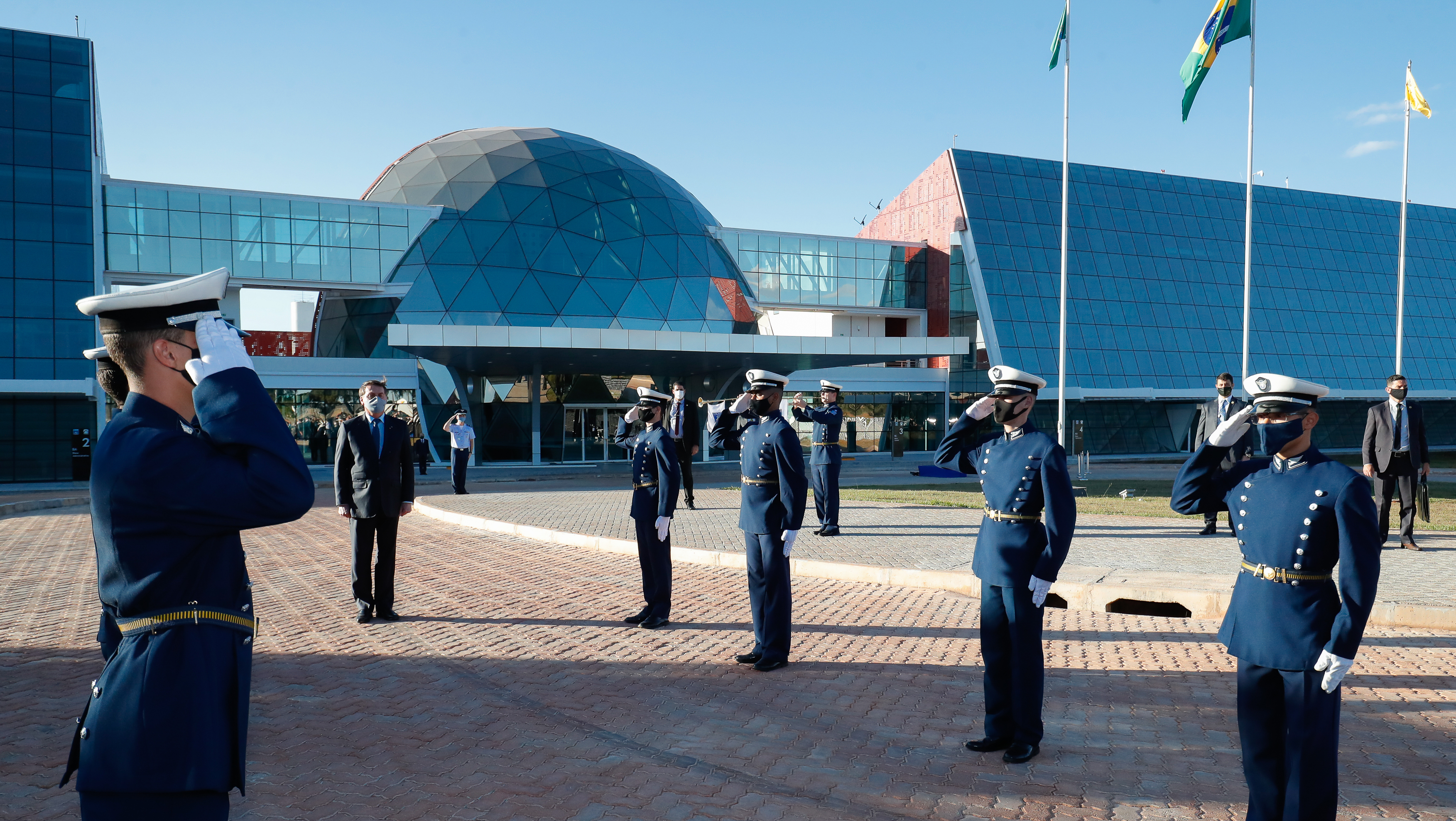
Brazilian President Jair Bolsonaro at the inauguration of the Space Operations Center in Brasília, June 2020.

The Space Operations Center (Portuguese: Centro de Operações Espaciais, acronym COPE) is a facility established in 2020 subordinated to the Aerospace Operations Command, with the objective of operating and supervising the Brazilian satellites.

== Bingo radio telescope ==
The Bingo radio telescope called Baryon Acoustic Oscillations from Integrated Neutral Gas Observations, is a project coordinated by the Ministry of Science, Technology and Innovation, Brazilian Space Agency, National Institute for Space Research (INPE) and international partners from Europe and China. The telescope will consist of two giant dishes, with 40 meters of diameter each, which will receive radiation from the space and project their spectrum in a series of metal detectors, called horns. Bingo will perform its detections in the radio band in the range of 960 to 1260 MHZ. 80% of the Bingo parts came from the Brazilian industry.

== International cooperation ==
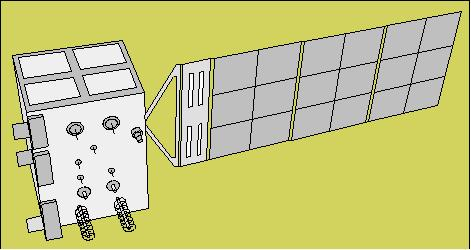
The CBERS/ZY-1 Sino-Brazilian

=== China/CBERS ===
China and Brazil have successfully cooperated in the field of space. Among the most successful space cooperation projects were the development and launch of earth monitoring satellites. The China–Brazil Earth Resources Satellite program (CBERS) is a technological cooperation program between Brazil and China which develops and operates Earth observation satellites. Brazil and China negotiated the CBERS project during two years (1986–1988), renewed in 1994 and again in 2004. As of 2023, the two countries have jointly developed six China-Brazil Earth Resource Satellites. These projects have helped both Brazil and China develop their access to satellite imagery and promoted remote sensing research. Brazil and China's cooperation is a unique example of South-South cooperation between two developing countries in the field of space.

=== International Space Station ===
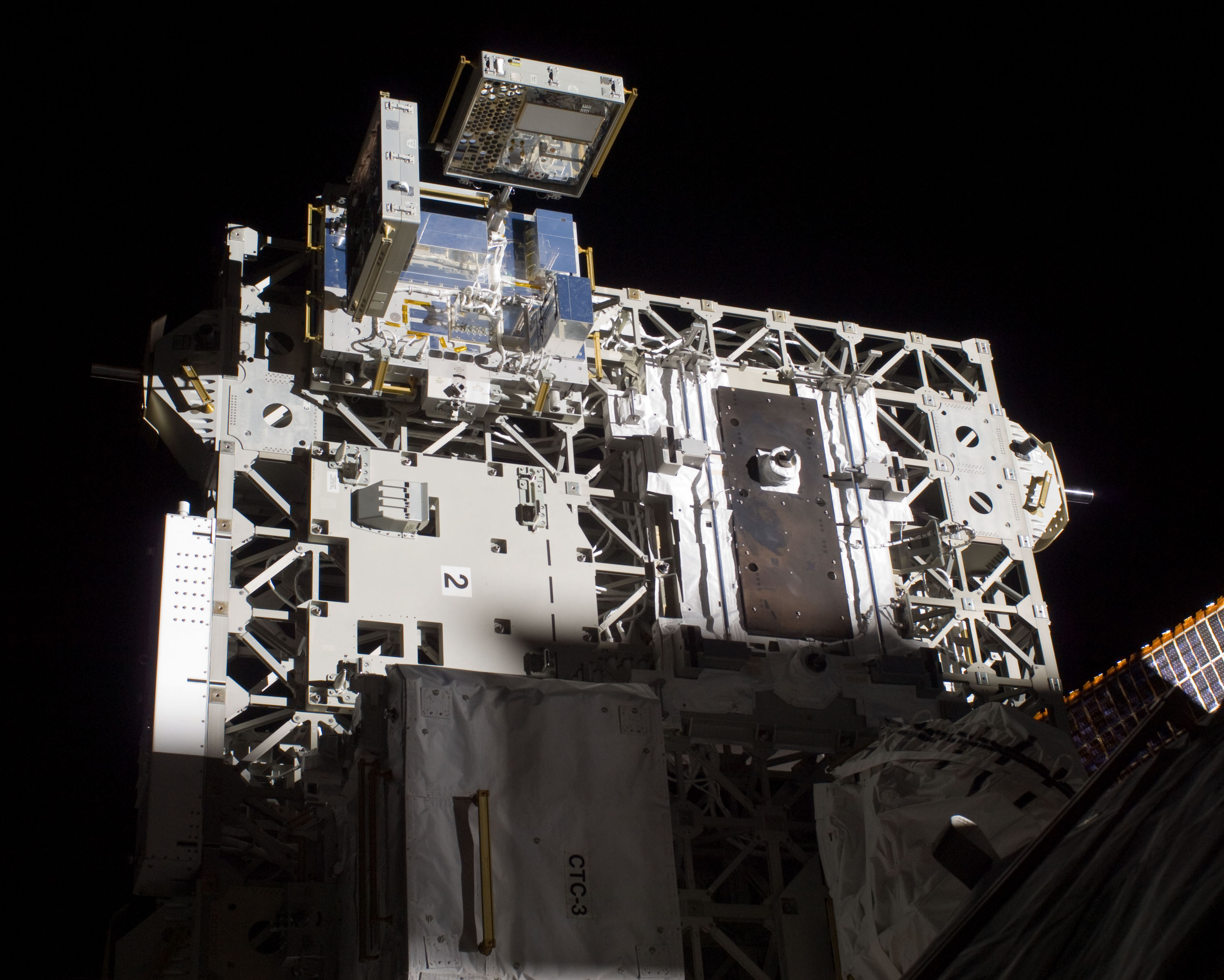
ISS Express Logistics Carrier

The Brazilian Space Agency is a bilateral partner of NASA in the International Space Station. The agreement for the design, development, operation and use of Brazilian developed flight equipment and payloads for the Space Station was signed in 1997. It includes the development of six items, among which are a Window Observational Research Facility and a Technology Experiment Facility. In return, NASA will provide Brazil with access to its ISS facilities on-orbit, as well as a flight opportunity for one Brazilian astronaut during the course of the ISS program. However, due to cost issues, the subcontractor Embraer was unable to provide the promised ExPrESS pallet, and Brazil left the programme in 2007. However, as a compromise, NASA have funded small Brazilian-made components for the Express Logistics Carrier-2 for the ISS, which were installed in 2009.

=== Ukraine/Ciclone 4 ===
On October 21, 2003, the Brazilian Space Agency and the State Space Agency of Ukraine established a cooperation agreement creating a joint venture space enterprise called Alcântara Cyclone Space. The new company will focus on launching satellites from the Alcântara Launch Center using the Tsyklon-4 rocket. The company will invest $160 million dollars in infrastructure for the new launch pad that will be constructed at the Alcântara Launch Center.

In March 2009, the Brazilian Government increased its financial capital by US$ 50 million.

The first launch was planned for 2014 from the Alcantara Launch Center.

Brazil pulled out of the program in 2015.

=== Japan ===
On November 8, 2010, National Institute for Space Research (INPE) and Japan Aerospace Exploration Agency (JAXA) signed a Letter of Intent regarding the Reducing Emissions from Deforestation and Forest Degradation in Developing Countries (REDD+) program. Examples of the cooperation include the monitoring of illegal logging in the Amazon rainforest utilizing data from JAXA's ALOS satellite. Both Brazil and Japan are members of the Global Precipitation Measurement project.

=== Artemis program ===
On 21 October 2020, Brazil was invited by the United States to join NASA's Artemis Space Program. On 15 June 2021, the country officially joined the program by signing the Artemis Accords with the U.S. and international partners, for the joint exploration of the Moon from 2024 and Mars and beyond in 2030s. The roles of Brazil include the development of a national lunar robot for the use in the future missions.

=== BRICS satellite constellation ===
On 18 August 2021, AEB signed cooperation agreements with space agencies of BRICS (Brazil, Russia, India, China and South Africa), to the joint-development of a remote sensing satellite constellation, aiming to help with common challenges for the mankind such as the climate change, major disasters and environmental protection. Ground stations located in Cuiabá in Brazil, Moscow Region in Russia, Shadnagar–Hyderabad in India, Sanya in China and Hartebeesthoek in South Africa will receive data from the satellite constellation.

== See also ==
- Aerospace Operations Command Brazilian space command
- Alcântara Space Center (CEA)
- National Institute for Space Research (INPE)
- Aerospace Technology and Science Department (DCTA)
- Technological Institute of Aeronautics (ITA)
- Embraer S.A. (Brazilian aerospace and defense conglomerate)
- Avibras (Brazilian aerospace and defense company)
- List of government space agencies
- List of Brazilian satellites
