= VS-50 =

Sounding rocket undergoing development

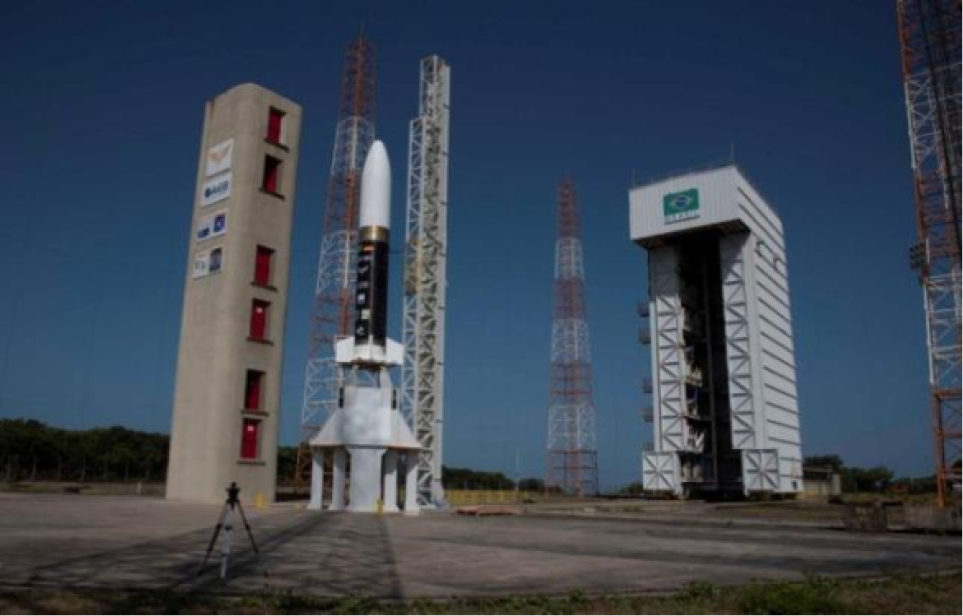
- Function: Sounding rocket Test of the VLM-1 subsystems
- Manufacturer: IAE; DLR
- Country of origin: Brazil, Germany

Size
- Height: 12 m (39 ft)
- Diameter: 1.46 m (4 ft 9 in)
- Mass: 15 t
- Stages: 2

Associated rockets
- Derivative work: VLM

Launch history
- Status: In development
- Launch sites: Alcântara Launch Center
- First flight: October 2026 (planned)

First stage – S50

Second stage – S44

The VS-50 (suborbital rocket VS-50) is a joint development of sounding rocket from the Institute of Aeronautics and Space (IAE) and German Aerospace Center (DLR).

== Characteristics ==
The V50 is a suborbital vehicle that uses solid propellant, having two stages: the first uses the S50 engine (made of composite material) and the second uses the S44 engine. It is 12 m long, 1.46 m in diameter, and has a mass of approximately 15 tons, and can carry up to 500 kg of payload.

Brazil (IAE) is responsible for developing the S50 and S44 engines, the backup navigation system, the launch and flight safety infrastructure, and project documentation management. The development and qualification of the other systems are the responsibility of Germany (DLR).

== Goals ==
The V50 rocket will be used primarily to develop, manufacture and flight qualify the S50 engine, as well as components to be used in the VLM-1 rocket. It will also be used in microgravity testing and hypersonic experiments (such as the German SHEFEX project).

== Development ==
- On December 22, 2016, a contract was signed between IAE and AVIBRAS for the production of eight S50 engines and their accessories. Engines 1 and 2 will be used for engineering tests (structural and burst tests). Engines 3 and 4 will be used for burn tests on a ground test bench. Engines 5 and 6 for validation during flights of the VS-50 rockets, and engines 7 and 8 will be used in the VLM-1 rocket.
- On November 15 and 16, 2018, at Avibras' facilities, acceptance and envelope burst tests were performed on the S50 engine, with the results being in compliance with the design requirements.
- On November 5, 2019, the test firing of the first prototype of the S-50 engine ignitor took place.
- On July 13, 2021, the second phase of Operation Santa Maria was completed, which integrated an inert S-50 engine and loaded it onto the launching table of the Mobile Integration Tower (TMI).

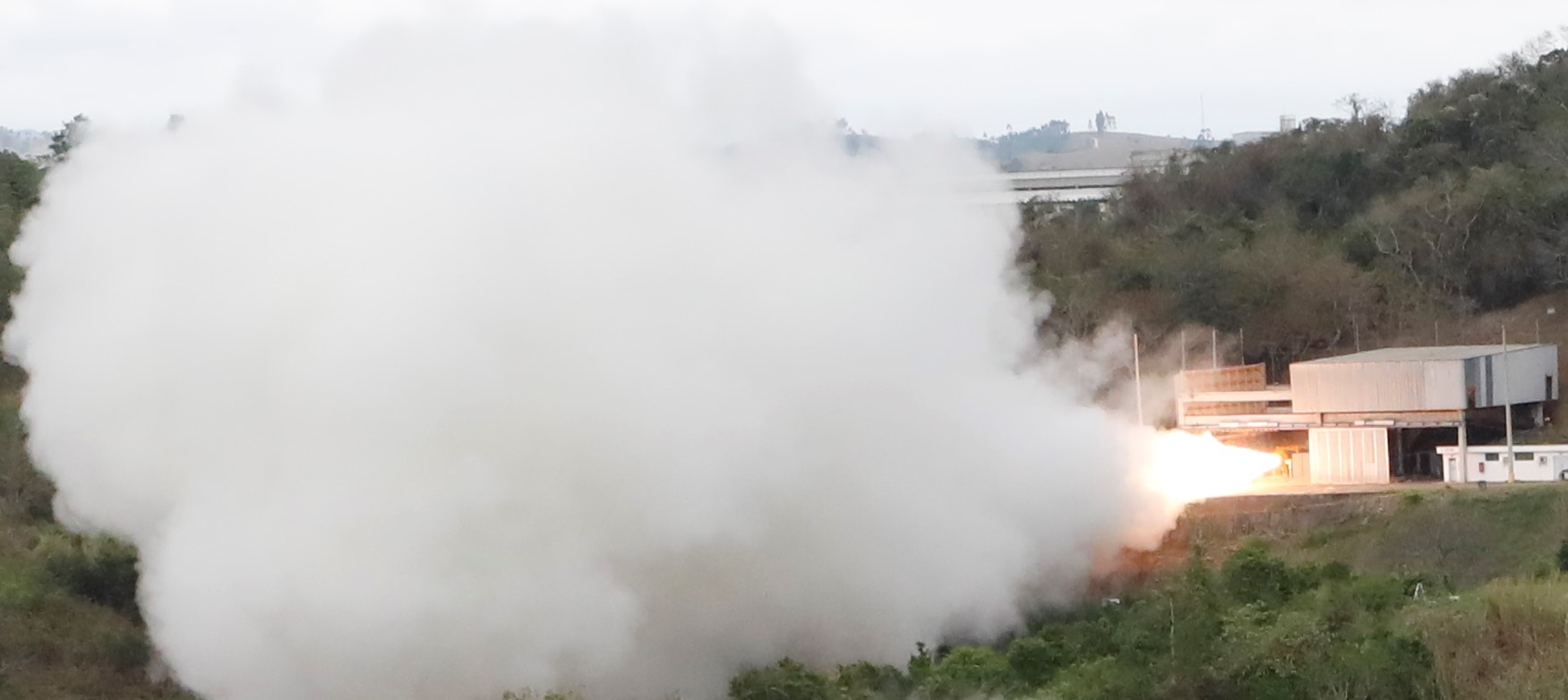
Test of the S50 engine.

- On October 1, 2021, a static burn test of the S50 engine was conducted on a test stand. The test lasted about 84 seconds and burned 12 tons of fuel. The objective was to test the engine's endurance and performance, and it was considered a success.
- On December 2, 2023, AEB's president announced that a first flight of the rocket is planned for 2024.
- On March 7, 2024, AEB had released the roadmap for 2025, with the VS-50 launch proposed for March 2025
- On August 19, 2024, due to Avibras bankruptcy situation, Brazilian Air Force has given the project to Mac Jee
- As of January 2025, the first VS-50 launch is scheduled for no earlier than October 2026.

== See also ==
- Sonda (rocket)
- Brazilian space program
- National Institute for Space Research
