= VLS-1 =

Brazilian Space Agency satellite launcher

VLS-1 Veículo Lançador de Satélites
- VLS-1
- Function: Orbital launch vehicle
- Manufacturer: CTA
- Country of origin: Brazil

Size
- Height: 19.5 m (64 ft)
- Diameter: 1.01 m (3.3 ft)
- Mass: 50,700 kg (111,800 lb)
- Stages: 3

Capacity

Payload to low Earth orbit
- Mass: 380 kg (840 lb)

Launch history
- Status: Cancelled
- Launch sites: Alcântara VLS Pad
- Total launches: 2
- Success(es): 0
- Failure: 2
- Notable outcome: 1 (pad explosion in 2003)
- First flight: 2 November 1997 (VLS-1 V01)
- Last flight: 11 December 1999 (VLS-1 V02)

Boosters – S-43
- No. boosters: 4
- Powered by: 1 solid rocket booster
- Total thrust: 303 kN (68,000 lbf)
- Specific impulse: 225 s (2.21 km/s)
- Burn time: 59 seconds

First stage – S-43TM
- Powered by: 1 solid rocket booster
- Total thrust: 320.6 kN (72,100 lbf)
- Specific impulse: 277 s (2.72 km/s)
- Burn time: 58 seconds

Second stage – S-40TM
- Powered by: 1 solid rocket booster
- Total thrust: 208.39 kN (46,850 lbf)
- Specific impulse: 275 s (2.70 km/s)
- Burn time: 56 seconds

Third stage – S-44
- Powered by: 1 solid rocket booster
- Total thrust: 33.24 kN (7,470 lbf)
- Specific impulse: 282 s (2.77 km/s)
- Burn time: 68 seconds

The VLS-1 (Portuguese: Veículo Lançador de Satélites) was the Brazilian Space Agency's main satellite launch vehicle. The launch vehicle would have been capable of launching satellites into orbit. The launch site was located at the Alcântara Launch Center due to its proximity to the equator.

Associated vehicles include the Sonda I, Sonda II, Sonda III and Sonda IV, the VS-30, VS-40 and VSB-30.

The VLS was cancelled after decades of development and high expenditures with poor results and a failed association with Ukraine that slowed the program for years.

== History ==
VLS-1 development started in 1984, after the first launch of the Sonda IV rocket. To date, three prototypes have been built and two launches attempted, departing from the Alcântara Launch Center. During the V1 and V2 prototype launches (VLS-1 V1 and VLS-1 V2) technical problems prevented mission success, but allowed the testing of several vehicle components. The V3 prototype exploded on the launch pad on 22 August 2003, two days before its intended launch date. The 2003 Alcântara VLS accident caused a considerable setback to the Brazilian space program. The V4 prototype was expected to be launched in 2016.

The project was terminated by Brazilian Space Agency in 2016.

The Departamento de Ciência e Tecnologia Aeroespacial (DCTA) (Department of Aerospace Science and Technology) and the Agência Espacial Brasileira (AEB) (Brazilian Space Agency) informed on public audience before the VLS-1 project ended by the Senado Federal (Federal Senate) on February 16, 2016.

== VLS-1 schedule ==
=== Initial flight test schedule ===
#	Photo	Vehicle	Payload	Date	Place	Result
1		VLS-R1	-	1985 December 1	CLA	Failure, apogee of 10 km.
2		VLS-R2	-	1989 May 18	CLA	Apogee of 50 km.
3		VLS-1 V01	SCD-2A	1997 November 2	CLA	in-flight failure
4		VLS-1 V02	SACI 2	1999 December 11	CLA	in-flight failure
5		VLS-1 V03	SATEC	2003	CLA	pad explosion on 2003 August 22

=== Final schedule ===
The V04 prototype was originally scheduled for launch in 2006. Further testing has resumed in 2008. The final VLS-1 schedule was as follows:

#	Photo	Vehicle	Payload	Date	Place	Result
1		mockup	electrical tests with a mockup rocket	2012	CLA	Success
2		VLS-1 XVT-01 VSISNAV	only first two stages active	2016	CLA	canceled
3		VLS-1 V-04	satellite launch	2018	CLA	canceled

== VLS Configurations ==
=== VLS-R1 test vehicle (1985) ===
The VLS-R1 test vehicle had two stages, arranged in the following configuration:

- Stage 1 - four S-20 rocket engines
- Stage 2 - one dummy S-20 rocket engine

=== VLS-R2 test vehicle (1989) ===
The VLS-R2 test vehicle had two stages, arranged in the following configuration:

- Stage 1 - four S-20 rocket engines
- Stage 2 - one S-20 rocket engine

=== VLS-XVI 01 sub-orbital test vehicle (2016, planned) ===
The VLS-XVI 01 sub-orbital test vehicle has three solid fuel rocket stages and boosters, arranged in the following configuration:

- Stage 0 - four S-43 rocket engines
- Stage 1 - one S-43TM rocket engine
- Stage 2 - dummy S-40TM rocket engine
- Stage 3 - dummy S-44 rocket engine

=== VLS-1 operational configuration (2018, planned) ===
The VLS-1 has three solid fuel rocket stages and boosters, arranged in the following configuration:

- Stage 0 - four S-43 rocket engines
- Stage 1 - one S-43TM rocket engine
- Stage 2 - one S-40TM rocket engine
- Stage 3 - one S-44 rocket engine

The rocket has four 400N RCS jets, located on the top of the third stage.

== Developments ==
=== VLM ===
The VLM (Veículo Lançador de Microssatélites) based on the S50 rocket engine is being studied, with the objective of orbiting satellites up to 150 kg in circular orbits ranging from 250 to 700 km. It will be a three-stage rocket, expected to launch the SHEFEX III mission by the German Aerospace Center (DLR) in 2023.

=== "Cruzeiro do Sul" (Southern Cross) program ===
==== VLS Alfa ====
In the framework of the proposed Cruzeiro do Sul program, the VLS-1 rocket is the basis of the VLS Alfa project.

L5 rocket based configuration - three-stage rocket, with the upper stage being liquid-fuel, putting 200 to 400 kg satellites into low equatorial orbits:

- Stage 0 - four S-43 rocket engines
- Stage 1 - one S-43TM rocket engine
- Stage 2 - one S-40TM rocket engine
- Stage 3 - one L5 rocket engine

L75 rocket based configuration - two-stage rocket, with the upper stage being liquid-fuel, putting 500 kg satellites equatorial orbits up to 750 km:

- Stage 0 - four S-43 rocket engines
- Stage 1 - one S-43TM rocket engine
- Stage 2 - one L75 rocket engine

#	Photo	Vehicle	Payload	Date	Place	Result
1		VLS Alfa XVT-01	-	2015	-	-
2		VLS Alfa XVT-02	-	2016	-	-
3		VLS Alfa V-01	-	2017	-	-
4		VLS Alfa V-02	SARA Orbital	2018	-	-
5		VLS Alfa V-03	-	2020	-	-

==== VLS Beta ====
The VLS Beta is another related project, intended to lift up to 800 kg payloads to an 800 km equatorial orbit. Its first flight was planned for 2020.

Three-stage rocket, with the upper two stages being liquid-fuel.

- Stage 1 - one P40 solid rocket engine
- Stage 2 - one L300 rocket engines
- Stage 3 - one L75 rocket engine

Projected flights are:

#	Photo	Vehicle	Payload	Date	Place	Result
1		VLS Beta XVT-01	-	2018	-	-
2		VLS Beta XVT-02	-	2019	-	-
3		VLS Beta V-01	-	2020	-	-

==== VLS Gama ====
The VLS Gama is intended to carry up to 1000 kg payloads to an 800 km polar orbit. Three-stage liquid-fuel rocket.

==== VLS Delta ====
The VLS Delta is capable of placing 2000 kg payloads in a geostationary orbit. Three-stage liquid-fuel rocket (VLS BETA body) with two solid fuel boosters.

==== VLS Epsilon ====
The VLS Epsilon is capable of placing 4000 kg payloads in a geostationary orbit. Three-stage liquid-fuel rocket (VLS BETA body) with two liquid-fuel boosters.

== Gallery ==
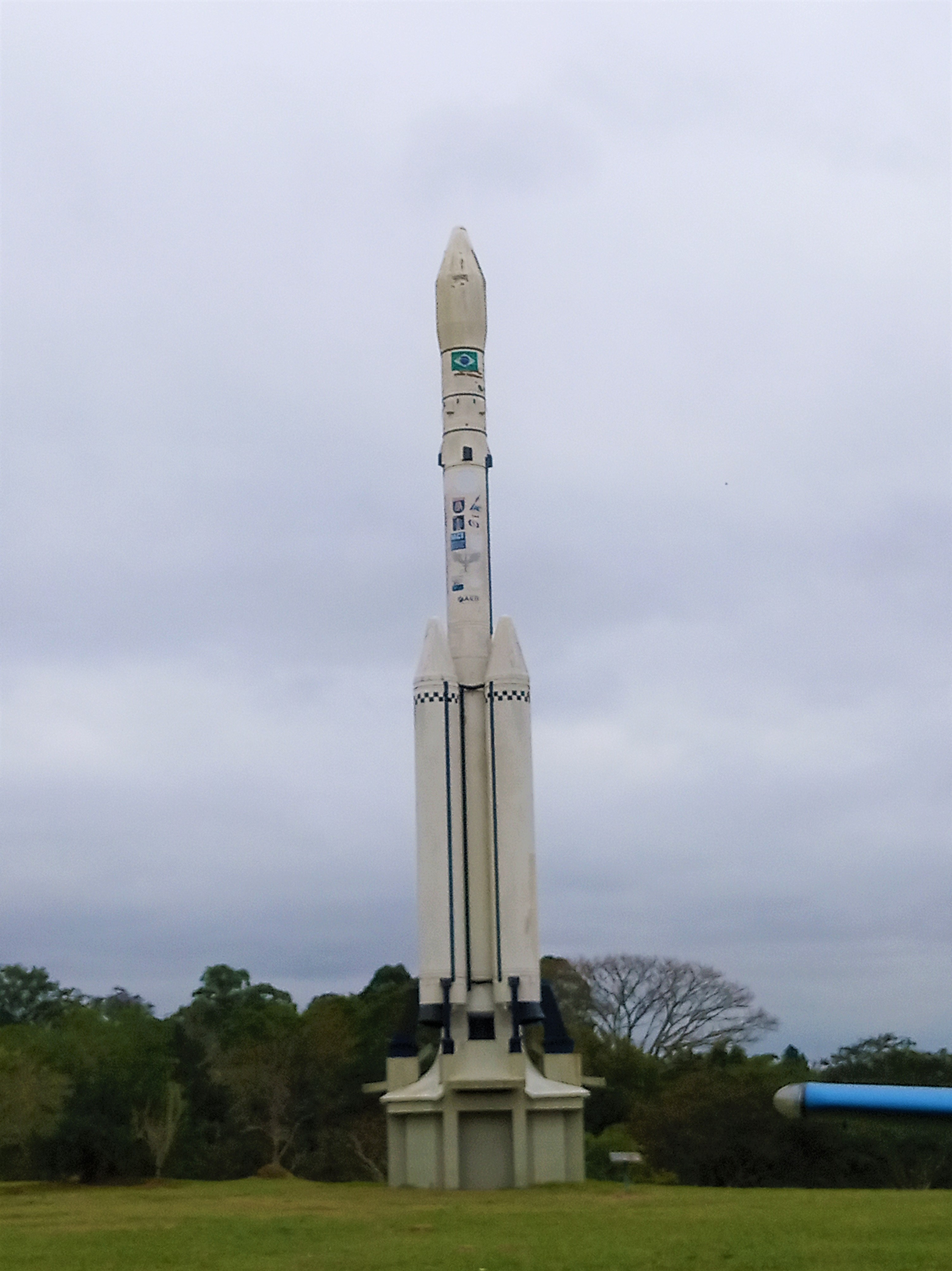
VLS-1 real size mockup

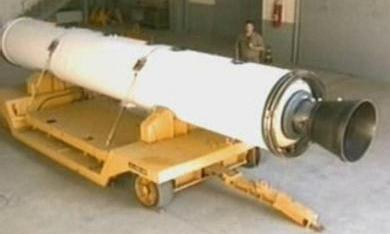
Engine

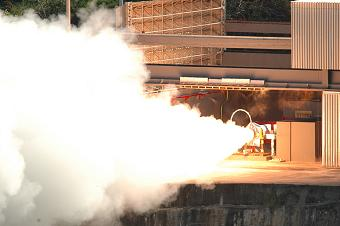
Engine test

== See also ==
- Comparison of orbital launchers families
