= Institute of Aeronautics and Space =

Brazilian aerospace research institute

- Instituto de Aeronáutica e Espaço
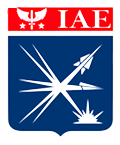
- Motto: Aeronautics, Space, Defense, Brazil!
- Established: 1 January 1954; 72 years ago
- Affiliations: Department of Aerospace Science and Technology
- Director: César Augusto O'Donnell Alván
- Location: São José dos Campos, São Paulo, Brazil
- Website: iae.dcta.mil.br

The Institute of Aeronautics and Space (Portuguese: Instituto de Aeronáutica e Espaço) is a military research organization of the Brazilian Air Force's Department of Aerospace Science and Technology (DCTA), founded on 1 January 1954.

The IAE was refounded in 1991 as result of the merger of the Brazil's Institute of Space Activities and the Institute of Development and Research subordinated to the DCTA. The current IAE have a strong presence in the space and aeronautics activities in Brazil.

Together with the National Institute for Space Research (INPE), the Alcântara Space Center (CEA) and the Barreira do Inferno Launch Center (CLBI), these public organizations represent today the pillars for the national space program through the Brazilian Space Agency (AEB).

The IAE is responsible for the development of rockets and launchers such as the VLM-1 for AEB, the VSB-30 and 14-X for the Brazilian Air Force, satellites and the corresponding ground stations for the CEA, among other tasks.

== Developments ==
The list of rockets and launchers developed by the IAE:

- VLS
- Sonda I
- Sonda II
- Sonda III
- Sonda IV
- VS-30
- VS-40
- VSB-30
- VLM-1
- 14-X

== See also ==
- Brazilian Organization for the Development of Aeronautical Certification
- Brazilian Space Agency
- Brazilian space program
- Instituto Tecnológico de Aeronáutica
