= DCTA 14-X =

Brazilian scramjet engine in development

14-X
- Artist's conception of the 14-XW demonstrator

General information
- Type: Scramjet engine
- National origin: Brazil
- Manufacturer: Department of Aerospace Science and Technology (DCTA)
- Designer: Institute of Advanced Studies of the DCTA
- Status: Flight testing
- Primary users: Brazilian Air Force Brazilian Space Agency

History
- First flight: 14 December 2021

The 14-X is a Brazilian scramjet engine in development by the Aerothermodynamics and Hypersonics Laboratory Henry T. Nagamatsu of the Institute of Advanced Studies (IEAv) of the Department of Aerospace Science and Technology as part of the PropHiper (Portuguese: Projeto de Propulsão Hipersônica 14-X). The name is a reference to the 14-bis, of the Brazilian inventor and aviation pioneer Alberto Santos-Dumont.

The Brazilian Air Force conducted the first qualification test flight of the 14-X engine on 14 December 2021 from the Alcântara Space Center.

== Development ==
Brazil conducts studies in the field of aspirated hypersonics since 1990s, but a development plan was conceived only in 2007, through the PropHiper project, made official by the Air Force in 2008, when the engineer-captain of the Brazilian Air Force, Tiago Cavalcanti Rolim, started a master's degree at the Instituto Tecnológico de Aeronáutica (ITA) and was approved with a thesis on the waverider configuration. The development of the project started with an experimental model by the Institute for Advanced Studies in the same year. Testing of the hypersonic engine started in October 2009.

== Project details ==
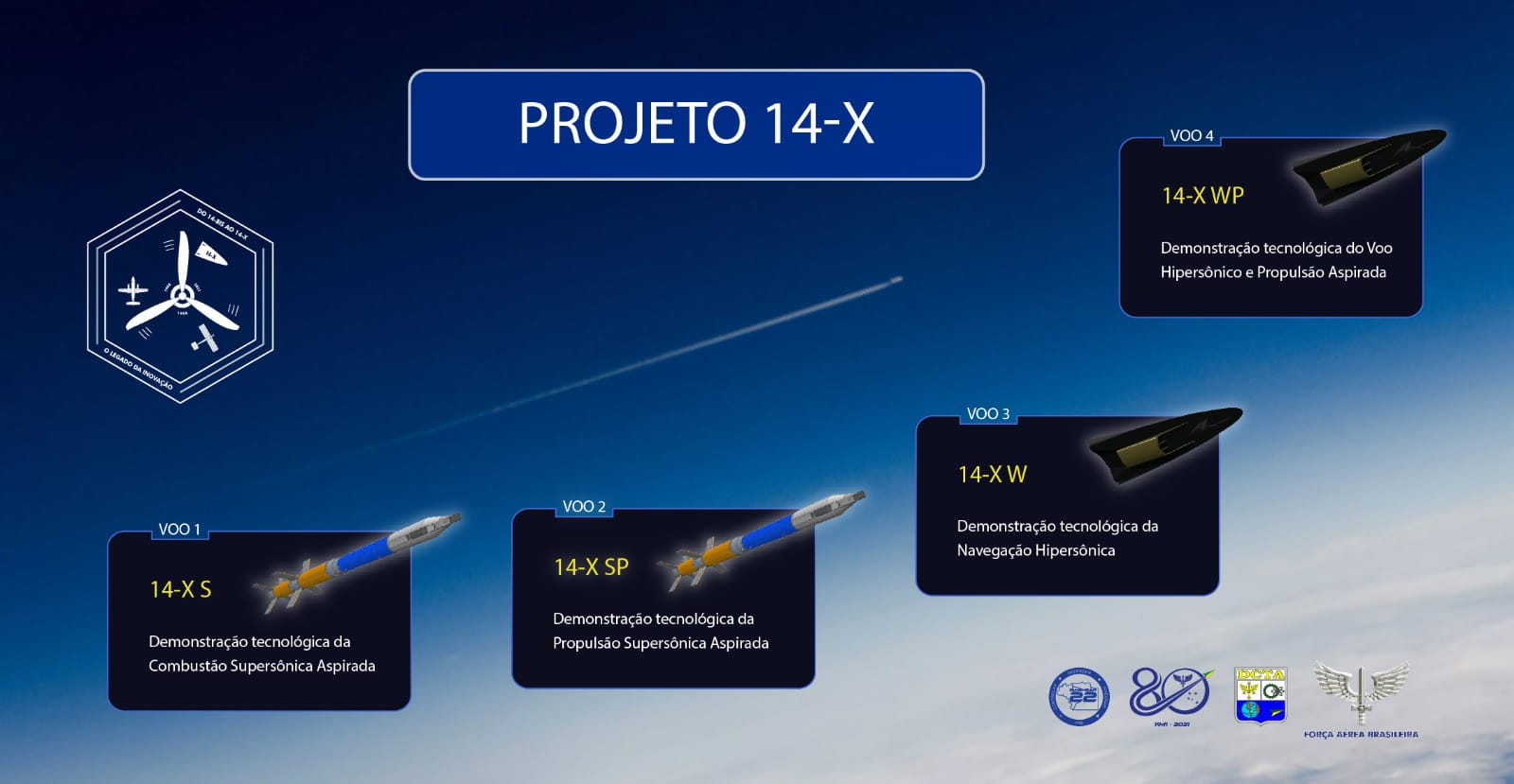
Project steps and demonstrators to be built

A video showing a VSB-30 launch in Esrange, Sweden as part of TEXUS 49 in 2011.

14-X S

On 2 December 2021, the Air Force's Department of Aerospace Science and Technology (DCTA) announced the beginning of Cruzeiro Operation seeking to conduct the first flight of the 14-X. The flight date was kept confidential.

The first test flight of the 14-X scramjet engine took place at the Alcantara Space Center, using a Hypersonic Technology Demonstrator Vehicle named 14-X S . The vehicle was placed at an altitude of about 30 km by a VSB-30 booster before 14-X activation, which saw the vehicle reach an apogee of 160 km and was monitored by the tracking station of the Barreira do Inferno Launch Center in Rio Grande do Norte as it traversed a distance of roughly 200 km before dropping into a safe spot in the Atlantic Ocean.

Development of the 14-X project involves the building of four hypersonic technology demonstrator vehicles, each with its own demonstrational objectives:

- 14-XS: ballistic ascending flight with supersonic combustion;
- 14-XSP: ballistic ascending flight with aspirated hypersonic propulsion;
- 14-XW: Demonstration of glided flight, without propulsion, of a controllable and maneuverable hypersonic vehicle with guidance, navigation and control systems during hypersonic stratospheric flight;
- 14-XWP: autonomous flight of a controllable and maneuverable vehicle with active aspirated hypersonic propulsion.

=== Purpose ===
The technology is considered by Brazil as one of the most efficient means of accessing space in the near future, and could be used to place satellites in orbit and make suborbital flights. It can also be used in other areas such as the development of intercontinental ballistic missiles with a more potent rocket or in civil aviation.

== Operation history ==
A list with conducted operations of the 14-X:

Date	Vehicle	Mission	Results	Ref
14 December 2021	14-X (XS VSB-30 V32)	Qualification (Cruzeiro Operation)	Success	

== See also ==
- Ballistic missile
- Brazilian space program
- Cruise missile
- Scramjet
- Scramjet programs
- Waverider
