= T3 Hypersonic wind tunnel =

Wind tunnel of the Brazilian Air Force

The T3 Hypersonic Wind Tunnel is a hypersonic wind tunnel of the Institute for Advanced Studies (IEAv) of the Brazilian Air Force. The T3 is the largest hypersonic wind tunnel in Latin America. The tunnel is capable of producing airflow at speeds up to 25 times the speed of sound (Mach 25). It was fully constructed by the IEAv with national technology. The tunnel is used by the Brazilian Air Force and the Brazilian Space Agency in its advanced projects.
