= SABIA-Mar =

Dual satellite joint Earth observation mission

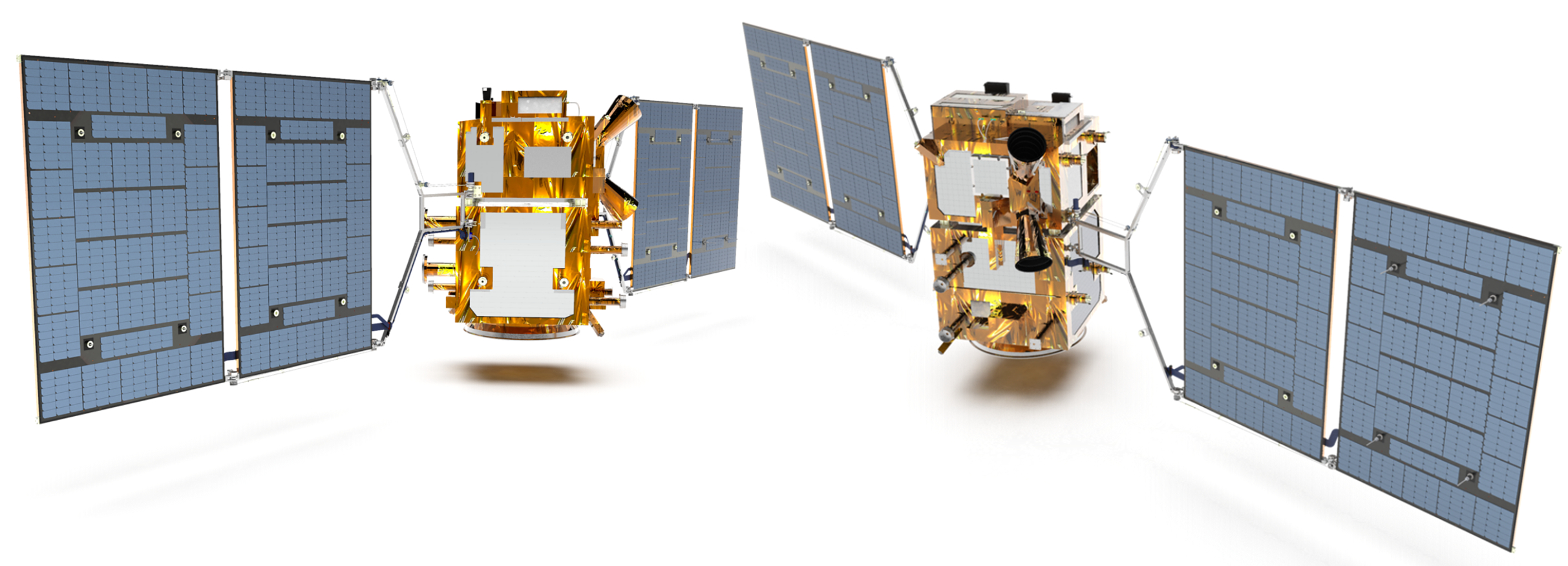
- SABIA-Mar 1 (left) and SABIA-Mar 2 (right)
- Names: SABIA-Mar 1 (Argentina); SABIA-Mar 2 (Brazil)
- Operator: CONAE / INPE
- Website: CONAE-SAC-E
- Mission duration: 5 years (planned)

Spacecraft properties
- Manufacturer: INVAP
- Payload mass: 680 kilograms (1,500 lb)
- Dimensions: 2 metres (6 ft 7 in) ⌀ × 2.2 metres (7 ft 3 in) height envelope

Start of mission
- Launch date: Q4 2024 (planned)

Orbital parameters
- Reference system: Geocentric orbit
- Regime: Sun-synchronous orbit
- Perigee altitude: 645 km
- Apogee altitude: 645 km
- Repeat interval: 4 days

Transponders
- Band: S-band and X-band (Downlink only)
Instruments
- VIS-NIR: Optical camera from VISible to NIR with 11 bands, from 412 nm to 865 nm.
- NIR-SWIR: Optical camera from NIR to SWIR with 6 bands, from 750 nm to 1600 nm.
- DCS: Data Collection System
- TIR: Thermal InfraRed camera in two bands, 11 and 12 microns.
- MAC: Multi-Angle multispectral Camera with 5 bands, 4 multi-angle and 1 panchromatic.
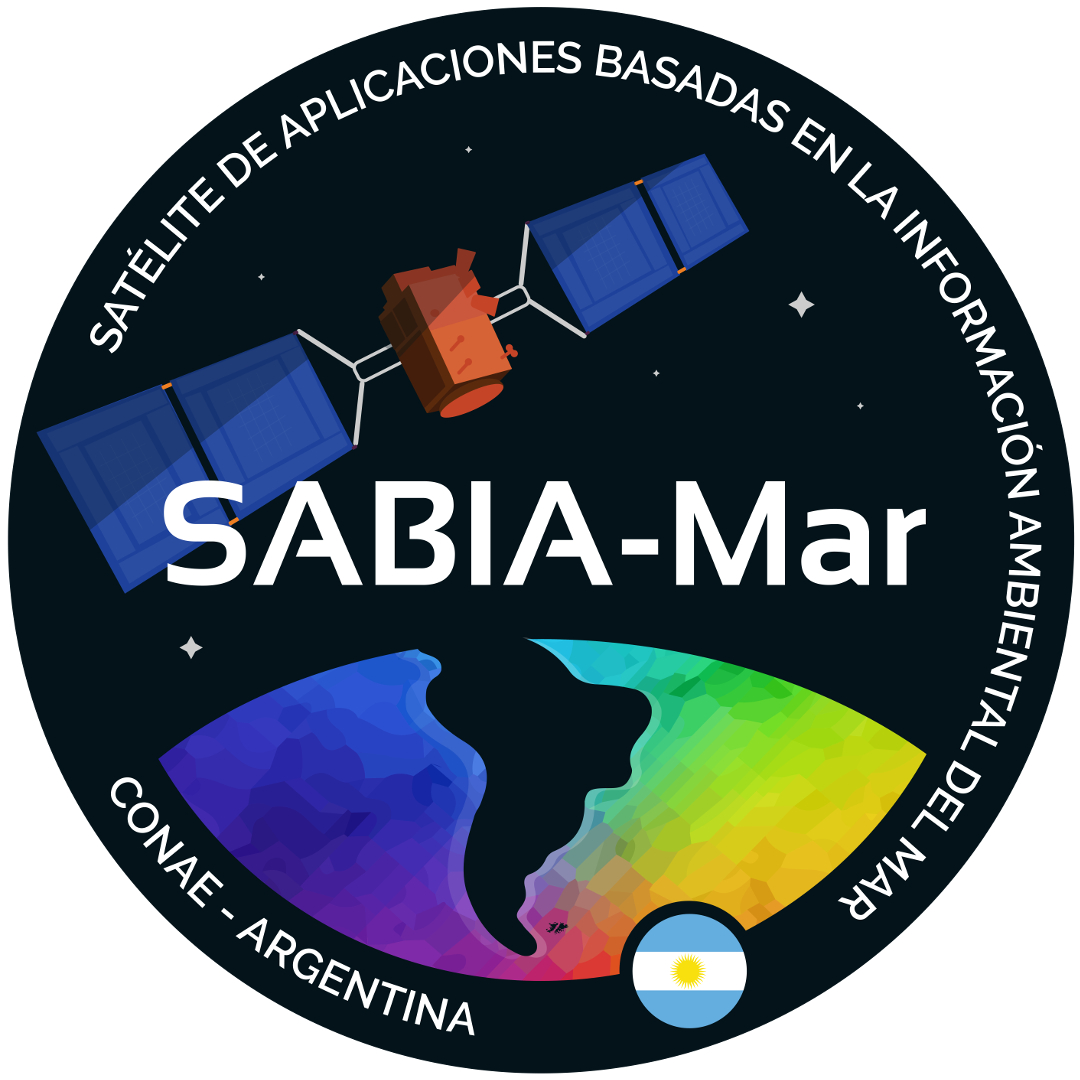

SABIA-Mar (Spanish: Satélites Argentino-Brasileño para Información Ambiental del Mar, Portuguese: Satélites Argentino-Brasileiros de Informações Ambientais do Mar), originally called SAC-E by CONAE, is a dual satellite joint Earth observation mission. The mission objective is to study the oceanic biosphere, its changes over time, and how it is affected by and reacts to human activity. It will focus on the monitoring of ocean surfaces, especially studying the ocean ecosystem, the carbon cycle, and marine habitats, as well as ocean mapping.

This collaboration between the Argentine (CONAE) and the Brazilian (AEB) space agencies was originally supposed to make two identical spacecraft with Argentina supplying the payload and Brazil the satellite bus. The satellites, SABIA-Mar A and SABIA-Mar B, were supposed to fly in 2017 and 2018, and operate until 2021.

By 2016, CONAE announced that a new agreement had been reached, where Argentina would build SABIA-Mar 1, and Brazil would build SABIA-Mar 2. The Argentine satellite, SABIA-Mar 1, is supposed to fly in 2024.

== SABIA-Mar 1 ==
SABIA-Mar 1 will be designed and built by the Argentine technological company INVAP. They will act as prime contractor and integrator, as well as supply two instruments. It is expected to be launched in late 2024, have a 5-year design life, and fly on a Sun-synchronous orbit with a four-day revisit frequency. It successfully passed PDR in April 2016 which marked the end of Phase B development, and the project entered Phase C (detailed design). In April 2018, the Critical Design Review (CDR) of the flight segment was approved.

== SABIA-Mar 2 ==
SABIA-Mar 2 will be built in Brazil on the Multi-Mission Platform (MMP), the satellite bus developed for Amazônia-1. It will have a service module with a dry mass of 292 kilograms (644 lb) and a power budget of 304 watts, and a payload module with a mass of 219 kilograms (483 lb) and a power budget of 260 watts. It is expected to be launched sometime in the 2020s.

== Instruments ==
- Global House: multispectral camera CCD camera with 1.1 km resolution
- Regional Chamber: CCS multispectral camera with 200 m resolution
- SST camera
- Chamber of images to ground

== See also ==
- Brazilian space program
