= Satélite de Reentrada Atmosférica =

SARA (Satélite de Reentrada Atmosférica)
- Operator: Instituto de Aeronáutica e Espaço
- Website: https://iae.dcta.mil.br/index.php/espaco/sara
- Range: 300 km (planned)
- Apogee: 350 km (planned)

Start of mission
- Launch date: 07:00, November 13, 2015
- Rocket: VS-40M
- Launch site: Centro de Lançamento da Barreira do Inferno

SARA - Satélite de Reentrada Atmosférica (Portuguese for "Atmospheric Reentry Satellite") was a Brazilian satellite project, with the objective of performing experiments in a microgravity environment and returning them to Earth.

== SARA Suborbital ==
=== Configuration ===
The SARA suborbital platform weighed 350 kg and was divided into four subsystems:

- Structural
- Electrical - included cold gas actuators, designed to null the satellite's angular velocity after launch
- Recovery - three parachutes: pilot, drogue and main
- Experiment module (MEXP)

=== Flights ===
==== SARA Suborbital 1 / Operação São Lourenço ====
The proposed flight schedule included a first suborbital test flight (SARA Suborbital 1) in 2014 using a VS-40 rocket launched from the Centro de Lançamento da Barreira do Inferno (Operação São Lourenço). The predicted apogee was 350 km, with a range of 300 km. The time spent in microgravity was expected to be around eight minutes, after which the satellite would reenter the atmosphere and be recovered at sea, approximately 100 km from Parnaíba.

On 13 November 2015, the launch was attempted, resulting in an explosion of the VS-40M V03 rocket on the launch pad.

==== SARA Suborbital 2 ====
A second suborbital flight was planned (SARA Suborbital 2) to test the flight attitude control system and de-orbit engine.

== SARA Orbital ==
The orbital version of the satellite was planned to operate in a circular 300 km low Earth orbit for a maximum of 10 days.

== Project discontinuation ==
The SARA project was discontinued in late 2018, following a reassessment of its development by the Instituto de Aeronáutica e Espaço (IAE).
