= VLM (rocket) =

Proposed Brazilian satellite launcher

VLM-1 Veículo Lançador de Microssatélites
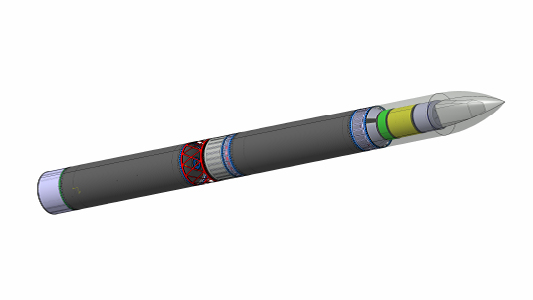
- VLM-1 configuration
- Function: Orbital launch vehicle
- Manufacturer: Institute of Aeronautics and Space
- Country of origin: Brazil

Size
- Height: 19.6 m (64 ft)
- Diameter: 1.45 m (4 ft 9 in)
- Mass: 28,000 kg (62,000 lb)
- Stages: 3

Capacity

Payload to LEO
- Mass: 150 kg (330 lb) to 300 km

Launch history
- Status: In development
- Launch sites: Alcântara Space Center
- First flight: NET October 2028

First stage – S-50
- Powered by: 1 Solid
- Maximum thrust: 450 kN (100,000 lb_{f})
- Specific impulse: ~277 s (2.72 km/s)
- Burn time: 82 seconds
- Propellant: Solid

Second stage – S-50
- Powered by: 1 Solid
- Maximum thrust: 450 kN (100,000 lb_{f})
- Specific impulse: ~277 s (2.72 km/s)
- Burn time: 82 seconds
- Propellant: Solid

Third stage – S-44
- Powered by: 1 Solid
- Maximum thrust: 33.24 kN (7,470 lb_{f})
- Specific impulse: 282 s (2.77 km/s)
- Burn time: 68 seconds
- Propellant: Solid

The VLM (Veículo Lançador de Microsatélites) is a proposed three-stage satellite launcher being developed by the Brazilian General Command for Aerospace Technology in collaboration with Germany. The project originated in 2008 as a simplified version of the VLS-1 rocket, using only the core stages. The first launch is currently planned for no earlier than October 2028.

A version based on the S-50 rocket motor is being developed, with the objective of launching satellites of up to 150 kg into equatorial circular orbits at 300 km altitude.

== VLM-1 description ==
The VLM-1 vehicle is designed to deliver up to 150 kg (330 lb) to a 300 km equatorial circular orbit. VLM-1 is projected to have a total mass of 28,000 kg (62,000 lb), including 10 tons of propellant. The first two stages will use the S-50 solid fuel engine, with the third using the same S-44 engine as in the VS-40 sounding rocket.

- Stage 1: S-50 rocket motor
- Stage 2: S-50 rocket motor
- Stage 3: S-44 rocket motor

Launches will be from the Alcântara Launch Center, located at the equator. There are plans to expand this design into the VLX launcher family, by adding liquid fuel upper stages or strap-on boosters.

== Development history ==
Development on VLM started in 2008 for the purpose of low-cost and reliable launch of microsatellites, based on existing Brazilian sounding rockets like the VS-40 and technology developed for the VLS-1 project.

Initially, a four-stage rocket using solid fuel was proposed, arranged in the following order:

- Stage 1: S-43 rocket motor
- Stage 2: S-40TM rocket motor
- Stage 3: S-44 rocket motor
- Stage 4: S-33 rocket motor

=== VS-50 ===
In 2011 it was decided to build a precursor single-stage rocket bearing a new motor called S-50. The vehicle is being developed and its motor tested in collaboration with the German Space Agency (DLR). This precursor test is called VS-50. The VS-50 vehicle measures 12 m (39 ft) long, 1.46 m (4 ft 9 in) in diameter, and has a mass of about 15 tons. All launches are planned to take place from the Alcântara Launch Center, located on Brazil's northern Atlantic coast.

On 1 October 2021, the Brazilian Space Agency successfully conducted the first full static fire test of the S-50 motor, lasting 84 seconds.

=== VLX family ===
When the VLM design and tests are completed to satisfaction, it is planned to develop a larger rocket family called VLX, targeting the delivery of payloads of between 300 and 500 kg to low Earth orbit. The VLX family will include two launchers named Aquila 1 (for delivery of 300 kg to 500 km) and Aquila 2 (for delivery of 500 kg to 700 km into a polar orbit). An early concept calls for two lateral S-50 motor configured as strap-on boosters. A new liquid fuel engine, called L-75, is being designed for this launcher family. As of 2018, it was hoped that the maiden flight of Aquila 1 would take place in 2023, and that of Aquila 2 in 2026.

== Planned versions ==
In the future, the L25 liquid fuel rocket engine will replace the solid 3rd stage engine. The configuration will be:

- Stage 1: S-50 rocket motor
- Stage 2: S-50 rocket motor
- Stage 3: L25 rocket engine (to be developed)

== Other possibilities ==
Brazilian researchers have studied the possibility of a cost-competitive launch system using S-50 motors in the first two stages and a set of liquid engines in the third stage. This system operating from the Alcântara Launch Center could insert satellites weighing up to 500 kg into polar orbits with a transport cost of approximately US$39,000 per kilogram of payload.

== Proposed flights ==
The qualification flight is VLM-1 (or XVT-00).

#	Vehicle	Payload	Date	Launch site
1	VLM-1 (XVT-00)	Qualification	NET Oct 2028	Alcântara VLS
2	VLM V-01	SHEFEX III	202x	Alcântara VLS

== See also ==
- Alcântara Space Center
