= VS-30 =

Brazilian sounding rocket

- Function: Sounding rocket
- Manufacturer: Instituto de Aeronáutica e Espaço
- Country of origin: Brazil

Size
- Height: 5 m (16.40 ft)
- Diameter: 0.56 m (1.83 ft)
- Mass: 1,400 kg (3,000 lb)
- Stages: 1 or 2

Launch history
- Status: Active
- Launch sites: Alcântara; Andøya; Barreira do Inferno; Svalbard Rocket Range
- Failure(s): 1
- First flight: April 28, 1997

First Stage - S-30
- Powered by: 1× S-30 solid rocket motor
- Maximum thrust: 102.00 kN (22,930 lb_{f})
- Burn time: 20 seconds
- Propellant: AP / HTPB

Second stage – Improved Orion (optional)
- Height: 2.8 m
- Diameter: 0.35 m
- Powered by: 1 Aerojet M112 dual-thrust solid rocket motor
- Maximum thrust: 7 kN (1,600 lb_{f})
- Burn time: 32 seconds

The VS-30 is a Brazilian sounding rocket, developed by the Instituto de Aeronáutica e Espaço and derived from the Sonda 3 sounding rocket first stage. It consists of a single, solid-fuelled S-30 stage, and has been launched from Alcântara, Maranhão and Barreira do Inferno, Rio Grande do Norte, in Brazil, and Andøya and Svalbard Rocket Range in Norway.

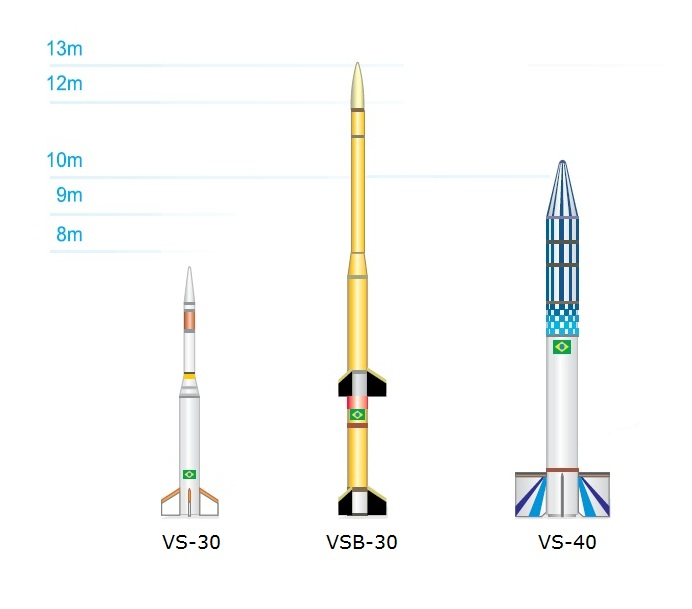
Brazilian VS rocket family

It has been launched both on its own, or in the VS-30 Orion configuration, with an American Improved Orion second stage. On its own, it can reach an apogee of 140 kilometres, and with an Orion upper stage, it can reach an apogee of 434 kilometres.

The VS-30 is also used as the upper stage of the VSB-30 rocket.

== Flights ==
List of VS-30 and VS-30 Orion flights:

Date	Flight	Location	Mission	Apogee
28.04.1997	VS-30 XV-01	Alcântara	DLR AL-VS30-223 (test)	128 km
12.10.1997	VS-30 XV-02	Andøya	DLR AL-VS30-226 (aeronomy)	120 km
31.01.1998	VS-30 XV-03	Andøya	DLR AL-VS30-229 (aeronomy)	120 km
15.03.1999	VS-30 XV-04	Alcântara	"São Marcos" (microgravity)	128 km
06.02.2000	VS-30 XV-05	Alcântara	"Lençois Maranhenses" (microgravity)	148 km
01.12.2002	VS-30 XV-06	Alcântara	"Cuma" (microgravity)	145 km
16.12.2007	VS-30 V07	CLBI	"Angicos" (GPS technology)	120 km
02.12.2011	VS-30 V08	CLBI	"Brasil-Alemanha"	
28.06.2013	VS-30 V09	Andøya	WADIS 1	
05.07.2013	VS-30 V10	Esrange	MAPHEUS 4	
01.09.2014	VS-30 V13	Alcântara	EPL-MEL5 "Raposa" (L5 liquid rocket engine test for 90s, total flight time 3m34s)	
05.03.2015	VS-30 V11	Andøya	WADIS 2	
02.02.2016	VS-30 V12	Esrange	SPIDER / LEEWAVES	
12.09.2018	VS-30 V124	Alcântara	"MUTITI"	120 km
21.08.2000	VS-30 Orion XV-01	Alcântara	"Baronesa"	
23.11.2002	VS-30 Orion XV-02	Alcântara	"Piraperna"	
27.10.2005	VS-30 Orion V03	Andøya	SHEFEX 1 (DLR)	
31.01.2008	VS-30 Orion V04	Andøya	ARR HotPay-2	
05.12.2008	VS-30 Orion V05	Svalbard	ICI 2	
03.12.2011	VS-30 Orion V08	Svalbard	ICI 3	
23.04.2012	VS-30 Orion V06	Andøya	HIFiRE 5	
13.09.2012	VS-30 Orion V07	Andøya	HIFiRE 3	
08.12.2012	VS-30 Orion V10	Alcântara	"Iguaiba"	
18.09.2013	VS-30 Orion V09	Andøya	ScramSpace 1 (launch failure)	
01.09.2014	VS-30 V13	Alcântara	EPL-ME (liquid rocket engine test)	
19.02.2015	VS-30 Orion V11	Andøya	ICI 4	
18.05.2016	VS-30 Orion	Woomera	HIFiRE 5b	
09.12.2018	VS-30 V14	Alcântara	PSR 01	
29.11.2024	VS-30 V15	CLBI	"Potiguar"	

VS-30 was used to test the EPL-ME (Estágio Propulsivo a Propelente Líquido) liquid propulsion upper stage in 2014.

On December 2, 2023, AEB's president announced that a VS-30 flight from Barreira do Inferno Launch Center is planned for 2024.

== Characteristics ==
- Length (mm) 7428
- Payload Mass (kg) 260
- Diameter (mm) 557
- Total takeoff mass (kg) 1460
- Apogee (km) 160

== S-30 rocket engine ==
The VS-30 sounding rocket uses the S-30 motor as a single-stage rocket for suborbital flights. It is also used in multiple stage configurations, such as the VLS (fourth stage), VS-30 Orion (mentioned above) and VSB-30 (where the S-30 is used as a booster stage).

The S-30 rocket engine is a solid-fuel rocket motor developed by the Brazilian Department of Aerospace Science and Technology (DCTA), primarily for sounding rockets (suborbital research rockets). It is part of the Sonda series, developed by the Instituto de Aeronáutica e Espaço (IAE) under the Brazilian Space Agency (AEB).

=== S-30 specifications ===
- Type: Solid-fuel rocket motor
- Fuel: HTPB-based composite propellant
- Thrust: 103 kN
- Burn time: 21 seconds
- SI: 275 s
- Diameter: 66 cm
- Length: 4.3 meters
- Fuel Mass: 880 kg
- Total Mass: 1250 kg

== See also ==
- VSB-30
- VS-40
