= VSB-30 =

Brazilian sounding rocket

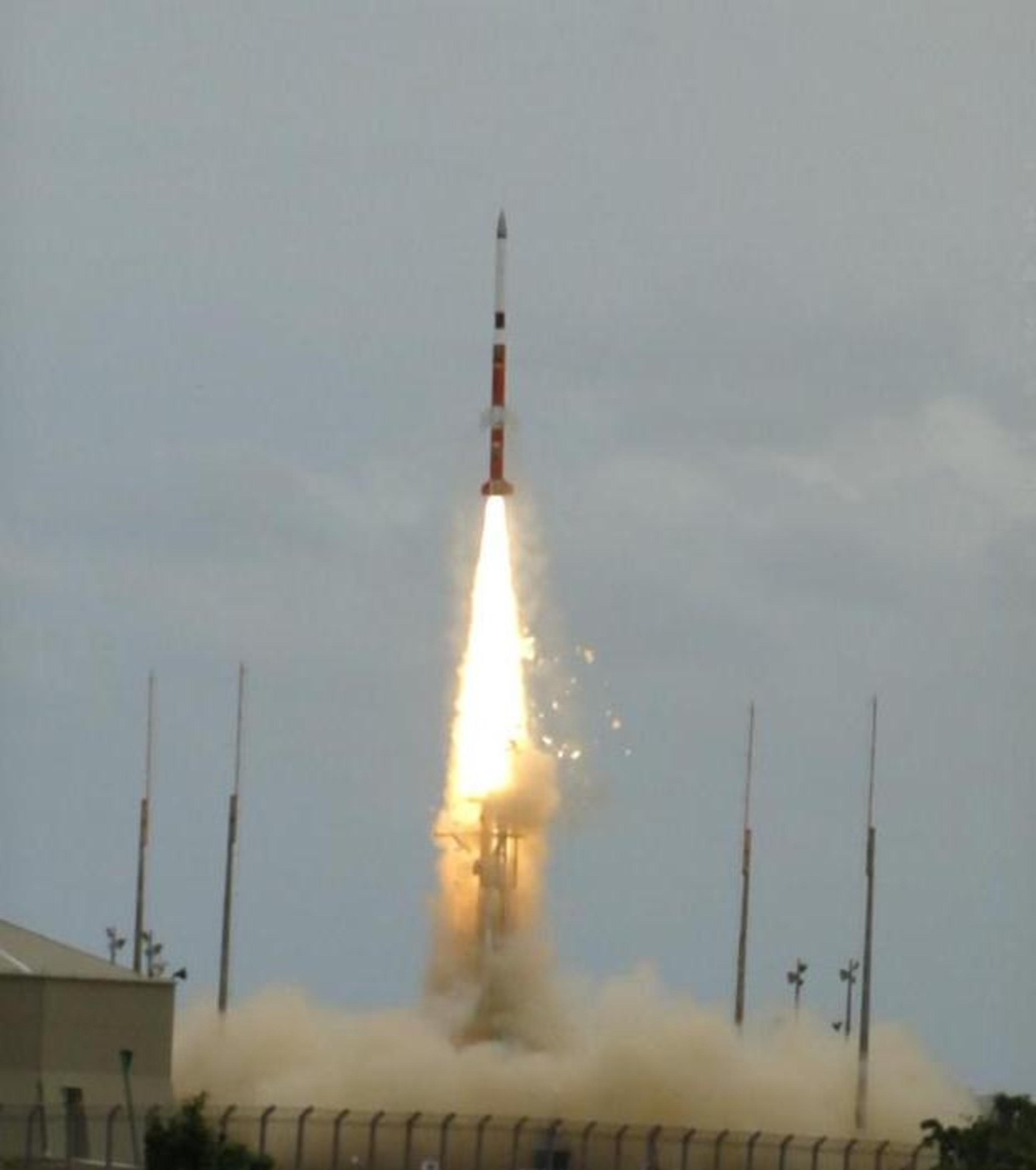
- VSB-30 V07 rocket launch
- Function: Sounding rocket
- Manufacturer: Institute of Aeronautics and Space
- Country of origin: Brazil

Size
- Height: 12.6 m
- Diameter: 0.56 m
- Mass: 2,570 kg
- Stages: 2

Capacity

Payload to Suborbital flight
- Altitude: 270 km
- Mass: 400 kg

Launch history
- Status: Active
- Launch sites: Alcântara; Esrange
- First flight: 23 October 2004

First stage – S-31
- Height: 3.2 m (10 ft)
- Diameter: 0.56 m (1 ft 10 in)
- Empty mass: 284 kg (626 lb)
- Gross mass: 900 kg (2,000 lb)
- Maximum thrust: 240 kN (54,000 lb_{f})
- Burn time: 11 seconds
- Propellant: Solid

Second stage – S-30
- Height: 3.3 m (11 ft)
- Diameter: 0.56 m (1 ft 10 in)
- Empty mass: 341 kg (752 lb)
- Gross mass: 1,200 kg (2,600 lb)
- Maximum thrust: 102 kN (23,000 lb_{f})
- Burn time: 20 seconds
- Propellant: Solid

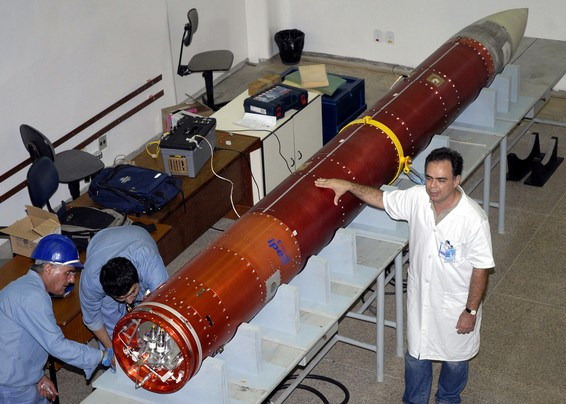
VSB-30 rocket assembly

VSB-30 - "Veículo de Sondagem Booster – 30" (Booster Sounding Vehicle) or "Foguete Suborbital VSB-30" is the designation of a Brazilian sounding rocket, which replaced the Skylark rocket at Esrange.

The VSB-30 is based on the VS-30 rocket (S-30 engine) with the addition of a booster stage (S-31 engine). Development started in 2000 in cooperation with DLR. The rocket can carry a payload of 400 kg to an altitude of 270 km. It has a liftoff thrust of 240 kN and a total mass of 2570 kg. It has a diameter of 0.56 m and a length of 12.6 m.

VSB-30 was first launched on October 23, 2004, at Alcântara Launch Center. The first launch at Esrange took place on December 1, 2005.

== Flights ==
VSB-30 performed the following flights:

| Date | Flight | Site | Name | Apogee |
|---|---|---|---|---|
| 23 October 2004 | XV-01 | Alcântara | Cajuana test | 240 km |
| 1 December 2005 | V02 | Esrange | TEXUS EML-1/TEXUS 42 Microgravity mission | 263 km |
| 10 May 2006 | V03 | Esrange | TEXUS 43 Microgravity mission | 237 km |
| 19 July 2007 | V04 | Alcântara | Cuma II Microgravity mission | 242 km |
| 7 February 2008 | V05 | Esrange | DLR TEXUS 44 (EML-2) | 264 km |
| 21 February 2008 | V06 | Esrange | DLR TEXUS 45 | 270 km |
| 15 May 2008 | V08 | Esrange | MASER 11 | 252 km |
| 22 November 2009 | V09 | Esrange | TEXUS 46 | |
| 29 November 2009 | V10 | Esrange | TEXUS 47 | |
| 12 December 2010 | V07 | Alcântara | MICROG 1A | 242 km |
| 29 March 2011 | V15 | Esrange | TEXUS 49 | 268 km |
| 29 March 2011 | V14 | Esrange | TEXUS 48 | 268 km |
| 13 February 2012 | V16 | Esrange | MASER 12 | 259 km |
| 12 April 2013 | V17 | Esrange | TEXUS 50 | |
| 22 February 2015 | V20 | Esrange | CRYOFENIX | |
| 30 March 2015 | V13 | Andøya | HIFiRE 7 | |
| 23 April 2015 | V18 | Esrange | TEXUS 51 | |
| 27 April 2015 | V21 | Esrange | TEXUS 52 | |
| 30 July 2015 | V24 | Esrange | Mapheus 5 | |
| 1 December 2015 | V22 | Esrange | MASER 13 | |
| 23 January 2016 | V23 | Esrange | TEXUS 53 | |
| 7 December 2016 | V11 | Alcântara | MICROG 2 | |
| 23 January 2017 | V19 | Esrange | MAIUS 1 | |
| 13 May 2017 | V25 | Esrange | MAPHEUS 6 | |
| 30 June 2017 | V12 | Woomera | HIFiRE 4a / HIFiRE 4b | |
| 13 May 2018 | V26 | Esrange | TEXUS 54 | |
| 31 May 2018 | V27 | Esrange | TEXUS 55 | |
| 24 June 2019 | V?? | Esrange | MASER-14 | 260 km |
| 15 November 2019 | V?? | Esrange | TEXUS-56 | 256 km |
| 14 December 2021 | V32 | Alcântara | Cruzeiro Operation (14-X S) | 280 km |
| 1 October 2022 | V?? | Esrange | TEXUS-57 | |
| 23 October 2022 | V29 | Alcântara | Operação Santa Branca (MQ-PSM) | 227 km |
| 23 November 2022 | V?? | Esrange | S1X-3/MASER 15 (SubOrbital Express 3) | 260 km |
| 24 April 2023 | V?? | Esrange | TEXUS-58 | 250 km |
| 2 December 2023 | V?? | Esrange | MAIUS-2 | 234 km |
| 15 February 2024 | V?? | Esrange | TEXUS-59 | 264.5 km |
| 24 March 2024 | V?? | Esrange | TEXUS-60 | 251.7 km |
| 26 November 2024 | V?? | Esrange | MASER 16 (SubOrbital Express 4) | 256 km |

== Characteristics ==
VSB-30 configuration

VSB-30 has the following configuration:

- Length (mm): 12600
- Stages: 2
- Payload Mass (kg): 400
- Diameter (mm): 570
- Total takeoff mass (kg): 2570
- Apogee (Max km): 270

=== Stages ===
==== S-30 solid rocket stage ====
- Gross Mass: 1,200 kg (2,646 lb)
- Unfuelled mass: 341 kg (752 lb)
- Height: 3.30 m (10.80 ft)
- Diameter: 0.56 m (1.83 ft)
- Thrust: 102.00 kN (22,930 lbf)
- Burn time: 20 s

==== S-31 solid rocket stage ====
- Gross Mass: 900 kg (1,984 lb)
- Unfuelled mass: 284 kg (626 lb)
- Height: 3.20 m (10.40 ft)
- Diameter: 0.56 m (1.83 ft)
- Thrust: 240.00 kN (53,950 lbf)
- Burn time: 11 s

== S-31 rocket engine ==
The VSB-30 sounding rocket uses the S-31 motor as first stage. The S-31 is also used in other various configurations like the VSB-30 Improved Orion, S-31 Improved Orion, S-31 Improved Malemute and S-31 Improved Malemute Improved Orion.

The S-31 is a solid-fuel rocket motor developed and manufactured in Brazil by Avibras Aeroespacial.

=== S-31 specifications ===
- Type: Solid-fuel rocket motor
- Fuel: HTPB-based composite propellant
- Thrust: 240 kN
- Burn time: 11 seconds
- Diameter: 56 cm
- Length: 3.2 meters
- Fuel Mass: 284 kg
- Total Mass: 900 kg

== See also ==
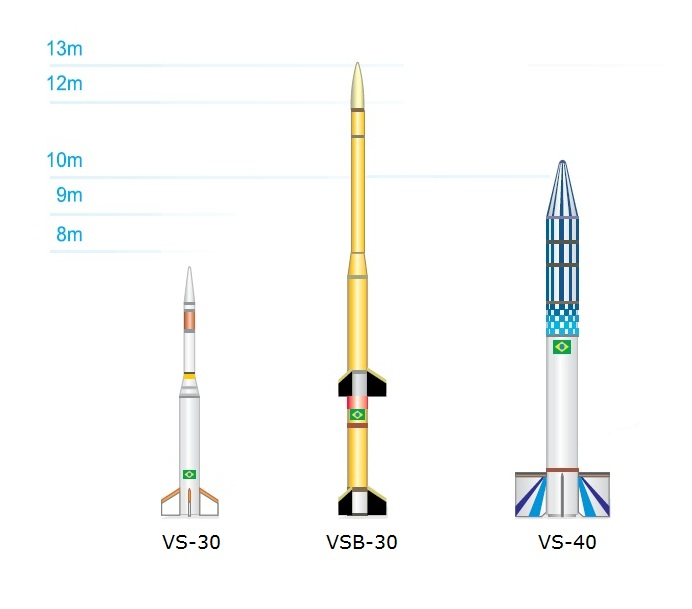
Brazilian VS rocket family

- VS-30
- VS-40
- List of rockets
