= VS-15 =

Brazilian rocket

- Function: Sounding rocket
- Country of origin: Brazil

Size
- Stages: 1

Launch history
- Status: Cancelled in 2013
- Launch sites: Alcântara

First stage - L-15
- Engines: 1
- Thrust: 15 kN
- Specific impulse: 321 s
- Propellant: LOX/RP-1

The VS-15 is a Brazilian sounding rocket. It consists of a single, liquid fuel recoverable stage, based on the new L-15 engine (with 15 kN of thrust). It would mainly qualify the L-15 engine in flight. The engine development project was canceled in 2013.

== Characteristics ==
- Thrust = 15 kN
- ISP = 321s
