= VS-40 =

Brazilian rocket

VS-40 (Foguete Suborbital VS-40)
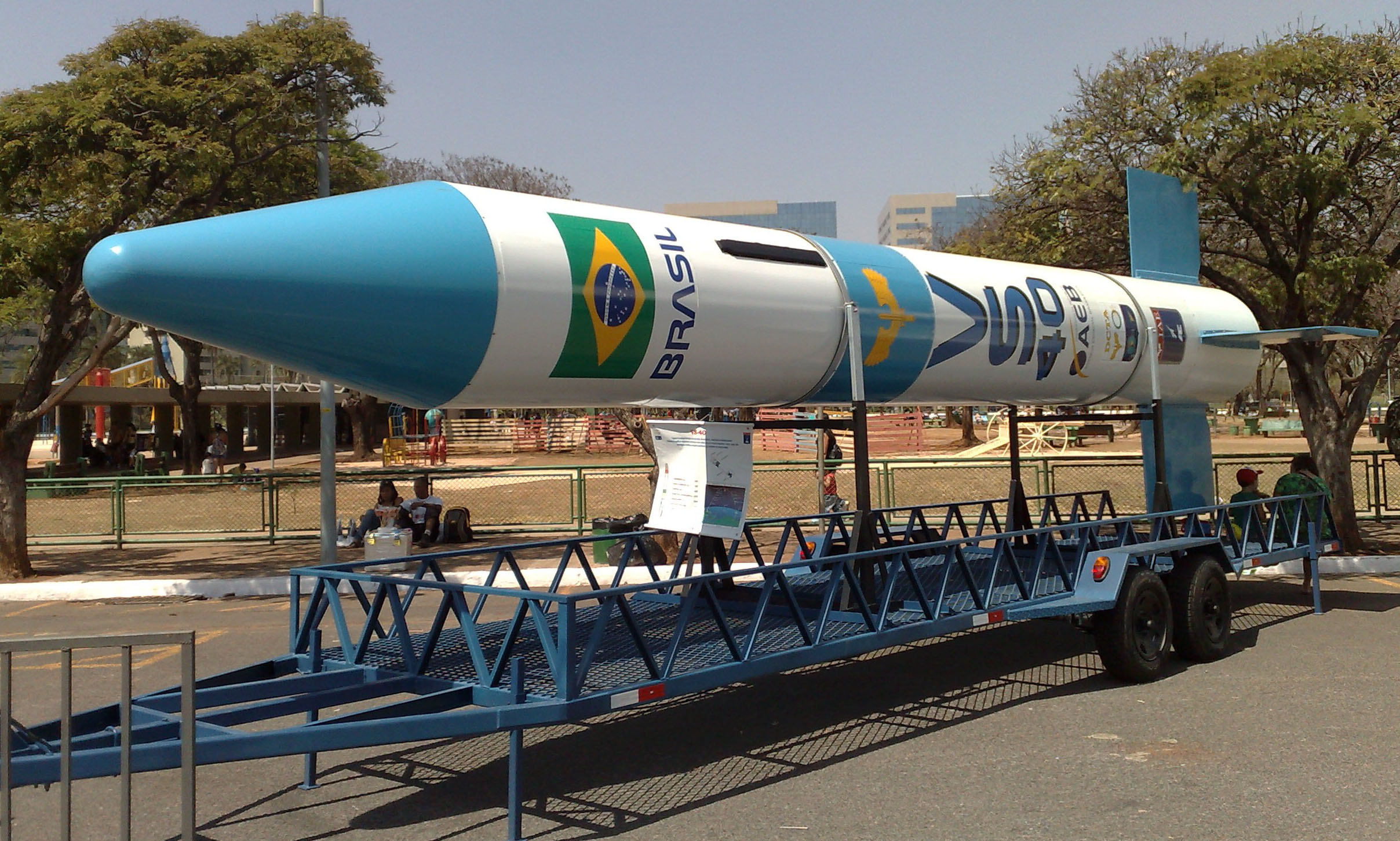
- VS-40 rocket on display in Brazil
- Function: Sounding rocket
- Country of origin: Brazil

Size
- Height: 9.5 m (31 ft)
- Diameter: 1.01 m (3 ft 4 in)
- Mass: 6,800 kg (15,000 lb)
- Stages: 2

Capacity

Payload to sub-orbital flight
- Altitude: 650 km (400 mi)
- Mass: 500 kg (1,100 lb)

Launch history
- Status: Active
- Launch sites: Alcântara Space Center, Andøya Space, Barreira do Inferno Launch Center
- Total launches: 3
- Failure: 1
- First flight: 2 April 1993

First stage – S40TM
- Gross mass: 4,200 kg (9,300 lb)
- Specific impulse: 275 seconds (2.70 km/s)
- Burn time: 56 seconds

Second stage – S44M
- Gross mass: 810 kg (1,790 lb)
- Maximum thrust: 33.24 kN (7,470 lb_{f})
- Specific impulse: 282 seconds (2.77 km/s)
- Burn time: 68 seconds

The VS-40 (Foguete Suborbital VS-40) is a Brazilian sounding rocket using solid fuel and stabilized aerodynamically.

The original version, VS-40, uses the S-40TM (4,200 kg) first stage engine and the S-44M (810 kg) second stage engine. This configuration corresponds to the upper stages of the VLS-1 rocket.

Version VS-40M used a S-40M engine for the first stage.

== Flights ==
VS40 performed the following flights:

Date	Version	Flight	Site	Mission
1993/04/02	VS-40	V01	Alcântara	Operação Santa Maria - Qualifying flight for the S44 engine. 760 seconds in micro-gravity.
1998/03/21	VS-40	V02	Alcântara	Operação Livramento - VAP-1 (Fokker) payload.
2012/06/22	VS-40M	V03	Andøya	SHEFEX (Sharp Edge Flight Experiment) II payload.
2015/11/13	VS-40M		Alcântara	Operação São Lourenço - SARA Suborbital 1 (reentry experiment) – Failure (exploded on pad)

A flight of VS-40M carrying "SARA Suborbital 2" was planned but eventually cancelled. A future flight of VS-40M carrying HIFiRE 8 is in development.

== Characteristics ==
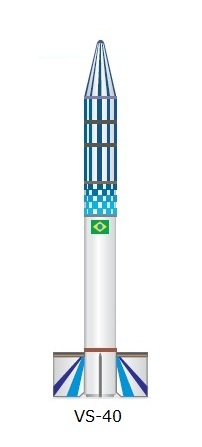
VS-40

- Length (mm) 6725
- Payload Mass (kg) 500
- Diameter (mm) 1000
- Total takeoff mass (kg) 6,737
- Mass of propellant (kg) 5,054
- Structural mass (kg) 1,028
- Apogee (km) 650
- Microgravity time (s) 760

== S-40 rocket engine ==
The S-40 is a solid-propellant rocket motor developed and manufactured by Avibras Aeroespacial, a Brazilian aerospace company, primarily for use in sounding rockets. Different versions were used on several rockets:

- S-40 - first stage of Sonda IV
- S-40TM - first stage of VS-40; third stage of VLS-1
- S-40M - first stage of VS-40M; second stage of VLM

=== S-40TM specifications ===
- Total mass: 5664 kg
- Unfueled mass: 1212kg
- Thrust: 208.39 kN
- SI: 275 seconds
- Burn time: 56 s

== S-44 rocket engine ==
The S-44 is a solid-propellant rocket motor developed by the Instituto de Aeronáutica e Espaço (IAE), part of Brazil’s Departamento de Ciência e Tecnologia Aeroespacial (DCTA). It was used as second stage of VS-40 and VS-40M; the third stage of VLM and the fourth stage of VLS-1.

=== S-44 specifications ===
- Total mass: 1025 kg
- Unfueled mass: 190 kg
- Thrust: 33.24 kN
- SI: 282 seconds
- Burn time: 68 s
