= Brazilian space program =

Space program of the Federative Republic of Brazil

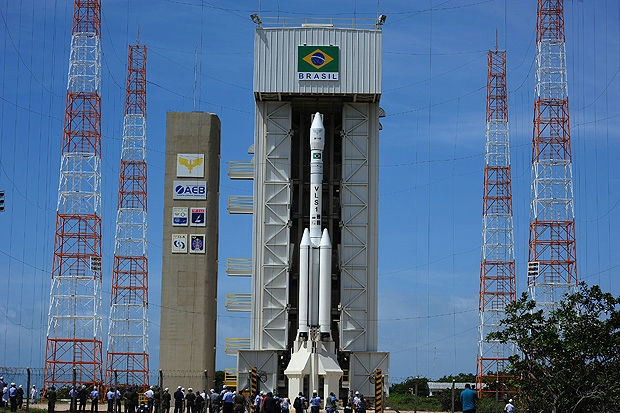
VLS on the launch pad

The Brazilian space program is the rocketry and space exploration programs conducted by Brazil from 1961, under GOCNAE (Group for the Organization of the National Commission on Space Activities) until the creation of the Brazilian Space Agency in 1994. It has significant capabilities in launch vehicles, launch sites, and satellite manufacturing. It is based at the National Institute for Space Research (INPE), under the Ministry of Science and Technology (MCT). Upon its founding the program was under complete military control, which hindered its development, as other countries (such as the United States) blocked technological development due to concerns over missile proliferation. In 1994, the space program was transferred to civilian control under the Brazilian Space Agency.

== History ==
Since 1964, in an attempt to build a satellite launch vehicle (Veículo Lançador de Satélite--VLS), Brazil has developed a series of sounding (research) rockets, named Sonda I, II, III, and IV. The early Sondas were test-launched from Barreira do Inferno Launch Center, near the city of Natal in the Northeast Region. The Sonda IV rocket was tested successfully on April 28, 1989. Subsequent launches were made from the Alcântara Launch Center (Centro de Lançamento de Alcântara--CLA), in Maranhão, President José Sarney's home state. The CLA, officially dedicated on February 21, 1990, cost more than US$470 million to develop. It is the closest launch center to the equator in the world (2.3 degrees south of the equator), making it attractive for launches of geostationary satellites. Equatorial launches from Brazil may require 20% less fuel than launches from Kennedy Space Center, but Polar orbit launches would require more fuel.

On February 9, 1993, the first satellite developed entirely in Brazil, the Data-Collecting Satellite (Satélite de Coleta de Dados—SCD-1), was launched. The SCD-1, sometimes referred to as the "green" satellite, is used by Brazilian National Institute for Space Research (INPE - Instituto Nacional de Pesquisas Espaciais) agencies. Both the SCD-1 The SCD-2, which was launched October 22, 1998, by a Pegasus rocket (a U.S. rocket), to collect environmental data.

On July 6, 1988, Brazil signed an agreement with China that calls for the joint development (between the INPE and the Chinese Space Agency) of two earth-imaging satellites to be launched by a Long March Chinese rocket from the Shanxi Launching site. Known as the China–Brazil Earth Resources Satellite program (Satélite Sino-Brasileiro de Recursos Terrestres--CBERS), the high-resolution CBERS will collect data from the entire planet and will be used for agriculture, geology, hydrology, and the environment. The Sino-Brazilian agreement was inactive from 1988 through 1991 because of Brazil's lack of funds. In October 1991 and November 1994, Brazil and China signed an additional agreements for the construction of the satellites, worth US$150 million. The CBERS-1 was scheduled to be launched in May 1997.

Embratel, a formerly state-controlled communications company in charge of the Brazilian Satellite Communication System (Sistema Brasileiro de Comunicação por Satélites--SBTS), owns and operates a series of satellites that are positioned in geostationary orbit over the equator. Arianespace, a French space and defense partner of France's Aérospatiale group, launched the first two Brasilsat satellites in February 1985 and March 1986.

Until 1994, the military directed most of the space program through the Ministry of Aeronautics, which is in charge of the Department of Science and Aerospace Technology (CTA, for Ciência & Tecnologia Aeroespacial). Created in 1950, the CTA is involved in research and development for the aerospace programs of the FAB (Brazilian Air Force). In 1965 the FAB created the Space Activities Center (Instituto de Atividades Espaciais—IAE), one of several institutes within the CTA, to develop rockets. Since its creation, the IAE has tested more than 2,000 rockets.

In 1971, a joint civilian-military committee, the Brazilian Commission for Space Activities (Comissão Brasileira de Atividades Espaciais - Cobae), was established and placed under the CSN (National Security Council). Cobae was chaired by the head of the Armed Forces General Staff (Estado-Maior das Forças Armadas—EMFA) and was in charge of the Complete Brazilian Space Mission (Missão Espacial Completa Brasileira--MECB). The MECB was created in 1981 to coordinate launch vehicles, launch sites, and the manufacturing of satellites.

On the civilian side, the MECB is headed by the INPE. Established in 1971, the INPE replaced the National Commission for Space Activities (Comissão Nacional de Atividades Espaciais--CNAE). The INPE is subordinate to the Ministry of Science and Technology and roughly the CTA's counterpart. The INPE develops satellites and conducts space and meteorological research. It has also been developing engines using liquid propellants since 1988, but with mixed results.

Within Brazil's MECB, civilians have been primarily responsible for satellite production, and the armed forces have been in charge of developing launch pads and rockets. Despite this division of labor, the armed forces were the dominant actors in the MECB, at least through 1993. Military officers occupied most of the high-ranking positions in the MECB.

=== Brazilian Space Agency ===
In an attempt to place the MECB more firmly in the hands of civilians, Brazil's President Itamar Franco signed a bill on February 10, 1994, creating the Brazilian Space Agency (Agência Espacial Brasileira--AEB). The AEB replaced Cobae, which acted merely as an advisory body and had no staff. The AEB, a semi-autonomous agency, has its own staff and responsibilities for policy implementation. It is led by a civilian, who is under the direct control of the president. The AEB oversees the MECB, but the Ministry of Aeronautics is still in charge of launch facilities and launch vehicles, and the INPE continues to direct the development of satellites. It remains to be seen, therefore, whether the AEB can effectively oversee the various ministries involved in the MECB.

The AEB was created in part to deflect criticism from the United States government, which viewed with alarm the involvement of Brazil's military in the MECB. The United States played a central role in the development of Brazil's MECB, beginning with its financial and technological support for the CTA and the INPE. In 1966 the United States supplied sounding rockets, which were launched subsequently by Brazil. Based on that technology, Brazil later developed larger boosters of its own.

The ties between Brazil and the United States were generally along functional lines within the two governments. The United States National Aeronautics and Space Administration (NASA) worked with the INPE, sharing data, helping to develop and implement scientific experiments, and training the institute's technicians and scientists. Likewise, the United States Air Force worked with Brazil's Ministry of Aeronautics and established a number of data-exchange agreements with the CTA that covered such matters as weather forecasting.

Brazil no longer relies as heavily on the United States for space technology. In 1981, it unveiled the MECB, an ambitious US$1 billion program with the aim of attaining self-sufficiency in space technology. At that time, Brazil committed itself to launching a series of four Brazilian-made satellites (two for weather forecasting and two for terrain photography) from Alcântara.

In further moves away from dependence on the United States, in the 1980s Brazil took steps to become self-sufficient in the production of ammonium perchlorate, an oxidizer for solid fuels. In addition to its indigenous research and development, Brazil now cooperates in its space program with Canada, the European Space Agency (ESA), Russia, France, and especially China. One joint satellite project with China is the China–Brazil Earth Resources Satellite. Brazil is also seeking space cooperation with new partners, such as Israel.

In the mid-1980s through the early 1990s, many United States policy makers were concerned with Brazil's MECB because of the possibility of diverting space-launch technology to a ballistic missile program. Although by mid-1997 Brazil had not produced a ballistic missile, its military had given high priority to the development of several missile systems, including the Piranha missile (MAA-1). Brazil's space-launch program, coupled with its artillery rocket technology, suggests that the country has the potential to develop advanced missiles, including ballistic missiles.

From 1987 to 1994, the United States sought to stifle the development of Brazil's ballistic missile program through the Missile Technology Control Regime (MTCR—see Glossary), formed on April 16, 1987. Given Brazil's advanced nuclear program, the United States was especially concerned that a potential Brazilian ballistic missile could eventually serve as a vehicle for a nuclear warhead. The United States restrictions on space technology to Brazil stalled Brazil's VLS (Satellite Launch Vehicle) program and ballistic missile research and development, strained United States security relations with Brazil, and prompted Brazil to explore closer ties with China, Russia, and various countries in Europe and the Middle East (especially Iraq). In October 1995, for example, Brazil offered Russia the use of its Alcântara base, to launch rockets.

In February 1994, Brazil announced that it would comply with MTCR guidelines. Such compliance would include export controls on Brazilian space and missile goods and technology. Brazil's accession to the MTCR coincided with various attempts by the United States to cooperate in space activities and seemed to signal a new era in space relations. Brazil's application for MTCR membership was accepted in October 1995. Thus, by the end of 1995 Brazil's space capabilities were improving, although they were modest by the standards of countries such as the United States and Russia. Some experts argued for the dismantlement of the VLS long-range rocket upon accession, in line with Argentina and South Africa discontinuing similar programs over weaponization concerns.

=== Controversies ===
In 2011, Wikileaks revealed that the U.S. government has tried to stop the creation and production of rockets in Brazil, demanding that Brazilian partners, such as Ukraine, not transfer their technology in this area to the country. The restriction was registered in a telegram sent by the U.S.' Department of State to their embassy in Brasilia, January 2009, as follows:

"We do not support Brazil's native space launch vehicle program. ... We want to remind the Ukrainian authorities that the US does not oppose the establishment of a launching platform in Alcântara, as long as such activity does not result in the transfer of rocket technologies to Brazil."

The United States also does not allow the launch of US satellites (or those manufactured by other countries but containing US components) from the Alcantara Launch Center, "because of our longstanding policy of not encouraging Brazil's native rocket program", according to another confidential document released.

=== Table of launch records ===
Brazil Launch Record (1983 to present)
Date	Launch Vehicle	Payload	Notes
2 April 1993	VS-40 PT-01	Santa Maria	
28 April 1997	VS-30 XV-01	DLR AL-VS30-223	
2 November 1997	Satellite Launcher Vehicle-1 F1	Brasil (Data Collection Satellite-2A)	Failure
21 March 1998	VS-40 PT-02	Livramento (VAP 1)	
15 March 1999	VS-30 XV-04	São Marcos	
11 December 1999	Satellite Launcher Vehicle-1 F2	Almenara (SACI 2)	Failure
6 February 2000	VS-30 XV-05	Lençóis Maranhenses	
21 August 2000	VS-30/Improved Orion V01	Baronesa	
9 December 2000	Sonda 3	XV-30 Alecrim (PSO)	
12 May 2002	Sonda 3	XV-31 Parnamirim (F2Glow-2)	
23 November 2002	VS-30/Improved Orion V02	Piraperna	
1 December 2002	VS-30 XV-06	Cumã	
22 August 2003	Satellite Launcher Vehicle-1 F3	São Luís (SATEC, Unosat, exploded during tests)	Failure
24 October 2004	VSB-30 V01	Cajuana	
19 July 2007	VSB-30 V04	Cumã II	
16 December 2007	VS-30 V07	Angicos (GPS technology mission)	
27 October 2008	Improved Orion V01	Parelhas	
29 May 2009	Improved Orion V02	Maracati I	
10 August 2009	Basic Training Rocket V01	FogTrein I Vôo 1	
13 August 2009	Basic Training Rocket V02	FogTrein I Vôo 2	
20 October 2009	Basic Training Rocket V03	FogTrein II Vôo 1	
21 October 2009	Basic Training Rocket V04	FogTrein II Vôo 2	
25 February 2010	Basic Training Rocket V05	Barreira I	
27 April 2010	Basic Training Rocket V06	Falcão I	
29 April 2010	Basic Training Rocket V07	Barreira II	
26 July 2010	Basic Training Rocket V08	Fogtrein I-2010 Vôo 1	
3 August 2010	FTI V01	Fogtrein I-2010 Vôo 2	
26 August 2010	Basic Training Rocket	Barreira III (canceled)	Canceled
20 September 2010	Basic Training Rocket V09	Fogtrein II-2010 Vôo 1	
30 September 2010	FTI V02	Fogtrein II-2010 Vôo 2	
6 December 2010	Improved Orion V03	Maracati II Vôo 1	
12 December 2010	VSB-30 V07	Maracati II Vôo 2 (MICROG 1A)	
27 April 2011	Basic Training Rocket V10	Barreira IV	
11 May 2011	Improved Orion V04	Camurupim	
26 May 2011	FTI V03	Fogtrein I-2011 Vôo 1	
27 May 2011	FTI V04	Fogtrein I-2011 Vôo 2	
16 June 2011	Basic Training Rocket V11	Falcão I-2011 Vôo 1	
17 June 2011	Basic Training Rocket V12	Falcão I-2011 Vôo 2	
31 August 2011	FTI V05	Fogtrein II-2011 Vôo 1	
2 September 2011	FTI V06	Fogtrein II-2011 Vôo 2	
20 October 2011	Basic Training Rocket F13	Barreira V	
25 November 2011	Improved Orion V05	Brasil-Alemanha Vôo 1	
2 December 2011	VS-30 V08	Brasil-Alemanha Vôo 2	
14 March 2012	Basic Training Rocket V14	Falcão I-2012	
29 March 2012	Basic Training Rocket V15	Valentim	
24 May 2012	Basic Training Rocket V16	Águia I–2012 Fase 1	
29 May 2012	Basic Training Rocket V17	Águia I-2012 Fase 2	
21 June 2012	Basic Training Rocket V18	Barreira VI	
8 August 2012	Basic Training Rocket V19	Falcão IV	
19 September 2012	Basic Training Rocket V20	Barreira VII	
27 September 2012	Basic Training Rocket V21	Falcão V	
31 October 2013	Basic Training Rocket V22	Falcão VI	
7 November 2012	Basic Training Rocket V23	Barreira VIII	
13 November 2012	FTI V07	Tangará I	
29 November 2012	FTI V08	Iguaíba Vôo 1	
8 December 2012	VS-30/Improved Orion V10	Iguaíba Vôo 2 (INPE 14)	
13 March 2013	Basic Training Rocket V24	Barreira IX	
23 May 2013	Basic Training Rocket V25	Falcão I-2013	
13 June 2013	FTI V09	Águia I-2013	
26 June 2013	FTI V10	Tangará I-2013	
8 August 2013	Basic Training Rocket V26	Falcão II-2013	
12 March 2014	Basic Training Rocket V27	Falcão I-2014 (AVIBRAS)	
9 May 2014	FTI V11	Águia I-2014	
21 August 2014	FTI V12	Águia II-2014	
28 August 2014	Basic Training Rocket V28	Barreira X	
2 September 2014	VS-30 V13/Estágio Propulsivo Líquido	L5 Raposa (Estágio Propulsivo Líquido-ME)	
2 October 2014	Basic Training Rocket V29	Barreira XI (do Inferno)	
10 December 2014	Basic Training Rocket V30	Barreira XII (XII Jornada Espacial)	
13 November 2015	VS-40M V03	São Lourenço (Satellite Atmospheric Reentry-Sub 1)	Failure
9 December 2018	VS-30 V14	PSR 1	
25 June 2020	Basic Training Rocket	Falcão I-2020	
October 2020	VSB-30 V32	Cruzeiro (Hypersonic Accelerator Vehicle, Scramjet 14-X S1 Demonstrator)	Date Changed
2020	VS-50	Dummy Payload (Test Flight)	Date Changed, Test Flight
2027	Vega C	Amazônia-1B (Remote Sensing Satellite-1B)	
TBD	TBD	GEOMET 1	
2021	VS-50	Hexafly-INT	
28 February 2021	PSLV C51 (Índia)	Amazonia 1	Successful launch
2022	VSB-30	Hypersonic Accelerator Vehicle (Scramjet 14-X S2 Demonstrator)	
2022	Microsatellite Launch Vehicle-1 (XVT-00)	Dummy Payload (Test Flight)	Test Flight
2023	TBD	Carponis 1 (Óptico)	
2023	TBD	LATTES 1 (Equatorial Atmosphere Research Satellite, Monitor e Imageador de Raios-X)	Date Changed
2023	VLX/Aquila 1	TBD	Test Flight?
2023	TBD	Amazônia-2 (Remote Sensing Satellite-2)	
2023	TBD	Carponis 2 (Óptico Nacionalizado)	
2024	TBD	SABIA-Mar 1 (SAC E)	
2024	TBD	Atticora (Comunicaçöes Táticas)	
2025	TBD	Lessonia 1	
2026	Aquila 2	TBD	
2026	TBD	Radar	
2020s	TBD	SABIA-Mar 2	
2020s	Microsatellite Launch Vehicle-1 V-01	SHEFEX 3	

== Brazilian satellites ==
- BrasilSat B1, Coverage
- BrasilSat B2, Coverage
- BrasilSat B3, Coverage
- BrasilSat B4, Coverage
- BrasilSat A2, USA Coverage
- Star One C1, launched on November 14, 2007, Band C Coverage, Band Ku Coverage, Band Ku Coverage – Mercosul

== See also ==
- Brazilian General Command for Aerospace Technology (CTA)
- Brazilian Space Agency
- Department of Aerospace Science and Technology
- National Institute for Space Research (INPE)
