= Sharp Edge Flight Experiment =

Program of the Deutsches Zentrum für Luft- und Raumfahrt

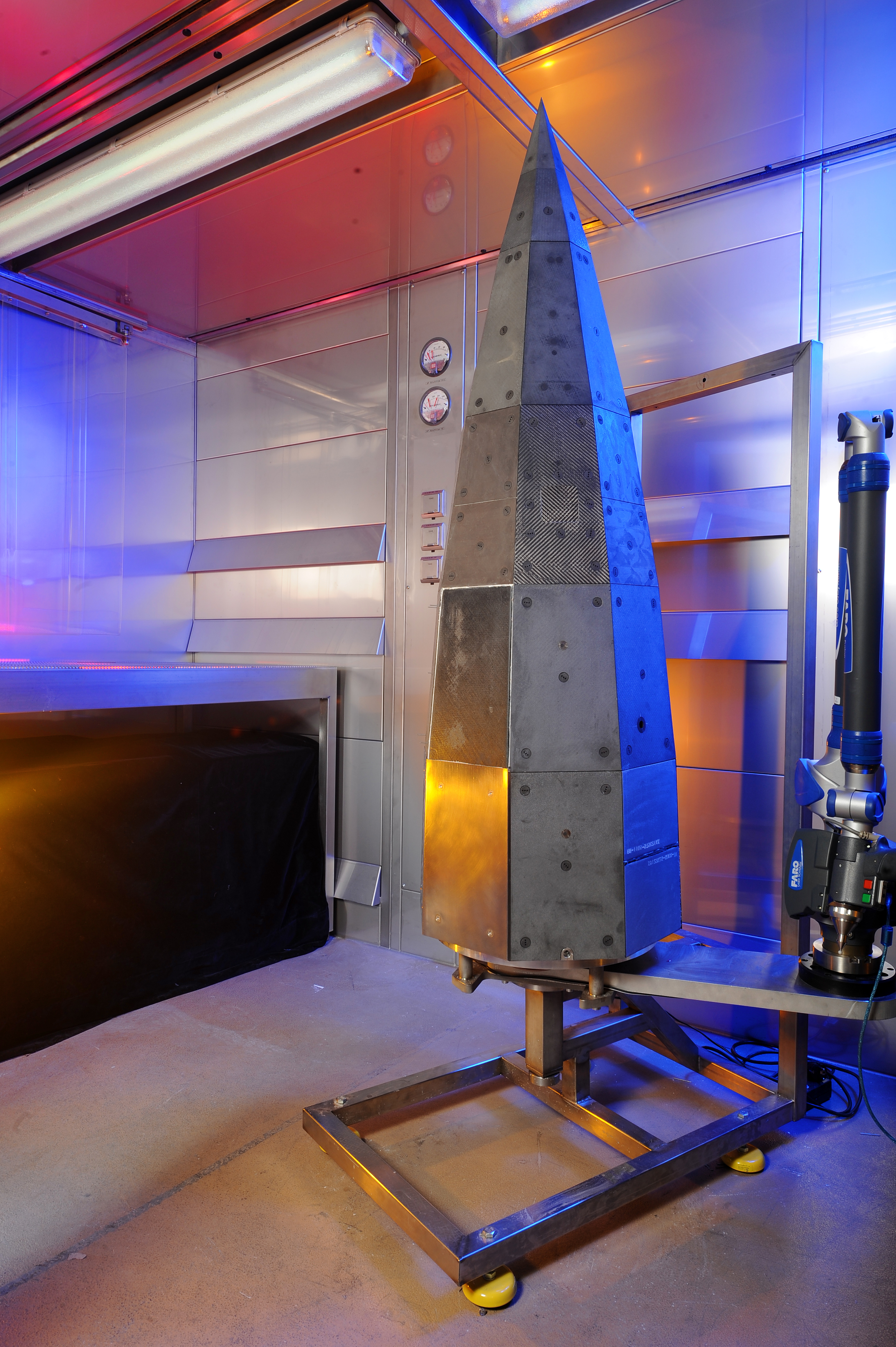
The assembled SHEFEX II body.

SHEFEX (Sharp Edge Flight Experiment), is an experiment conducted by the German Aerospace Center (DLR), for the development of some new, cheaper and safer design principles for space capsules, hypersonic vehicles and spaceplanes with re-entry capability in the atmosphere and their integration into a complete system.

DLR explained the objectives of SHEFEX: The aim of the research is a space plane that is usable for experiments under microgravity from 2020 on. It is set to finish with a space plane project named REX Freeflyer (REX for Returnable experiment, German: Rückkehrexperiment).

During re-entry of spacecraft into the Earth's atmosphere, the high velocity of the spacecraft together with friction and displacement of air molecules leads to temperatures of over 2000 °C. In order to avoid catastrophic failure upon re-entry due to excess heat, current spacecraft mostly rely on very expensive and sometimes fragile materials for their heat shields.

== First spacecraft with sharp corners and edges ==
The namesake idea for the sharp-edged flight experiment of Hendrik Weihs, coordinator for returning technologies DLR, is an entirely new form for a spacecraft, namely with sharp corners and edges instead of the rounded shapes ubiquitously used in present-day space flight. Flat tile shapes can be produced at a lower cost than highly individual rounded shapes.

Dr. Klaus Hannemann, Head of the spacecraft department at the DLR Institute of Aerodynamics and Flow Technology in Göttingen explains the fundamental advantage of the concept:

"A space shuttle has more than 25,000 differently shaped tiles. The simple shape of Shefex tiles should lower the maintenance costs of the thermal protection system and a simple replacement of tiles in space would be possible."

Additionally, the project is aimed at improving aerodynamics. General Project Manager Hendrik Weihs said:

"The capsule almost achieves the aerodynamic characteristics of a space shuttle, but is smaller and does not need wings."

Programmatically the DLR said:

"Judging from experience in the development of thermal protection systems, curved outer contours with high accuracy requirements were identified as a major cost driver. Large, curved fiber-ceramic structures require sophisticated production tools and require auxiliary molds and optimized manufacturing for each individual component. It is therefore possible to reduce costs through simplification by tessellating the outer contour with flat tiles with only few distinct shapes. It is possible in principle to produce different flat tiles from a basic tile by cropping. This also leads to significant savings in maintenance and replacement of damaged tiles. Problems arise, however, from the fluid dynamics around the sharp edges and corners, which give rise to very high temperatures that must be controlled by new technologies, such as actively cooled elements. Sharp edges have aerodynamic advantages as well, causing lower drag in hypersonic flight conditions."

== SHEFEX I ==
SHEFEX I was the first experimental vehicle of the SHEFEX project and launched on Thursday, 27 October 2005 from the Andøya Rocket Range in Norway. Shefex I reached a height of about 200 km over the North Sea. Within 20 seconds, the vehicle re-entered Earth's atmosphere at almost seven times the speed of sound. The measured data and live images of the on-board camera were transferred directly to the ground station. However, during the activation of the parachute system an error occurred that led to the loss of the parachute system and consequently to the loss of the flight unit. According to the DLR, the evaluation of the data provided important insights so that SHEFEX I could be seen as a great success from the perspective of the DLR. For the flight, a VS-30 Orion sounding rocket was used, which consisted of a Brazilian VS-30 first stage and a HAWK rocket as the second stage. The cost of the three-year project was approximately 4 million euros. It was part of the space program of the Helmholtz Association of German Research Centers (HGF) and the DLR.

== SHEFEX II ==
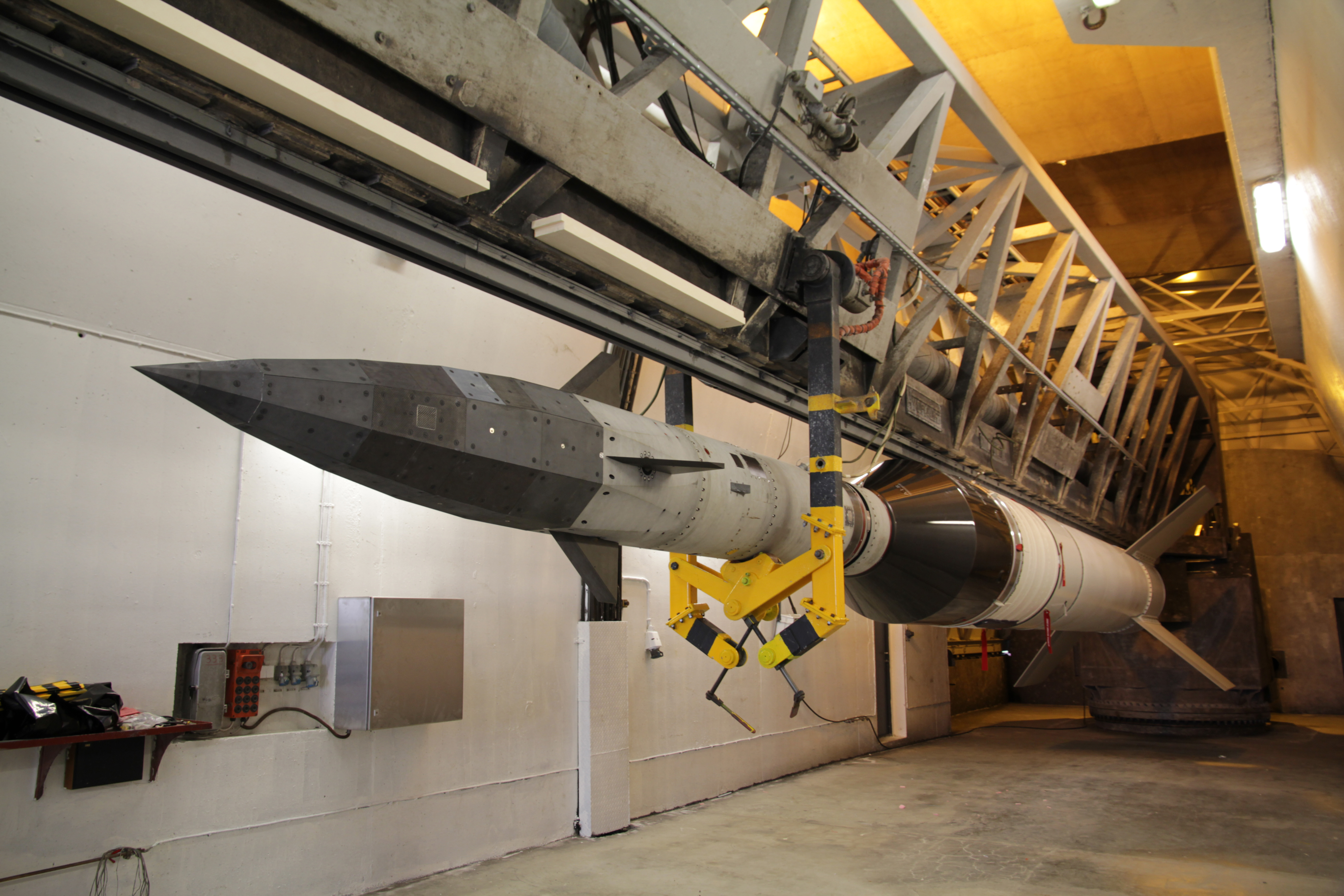
SHEFEX II atop of the VS-40M rocket at Andøya Rocket Range, being prepared for launch

With SHEFEX II, nine different thermal protection systems were to be evaluated on the facetted skin, mainly new fiber ceramics. Additionally, the aerospace companies EADS Astrium and MT Aerospace as well as Boeing used some of the surface of SHEFEX II for their own experiments. The vehicle was equipped with sensors to measure pressure, heat flux, and temperature in the vehicle tip.

On 22 June 2012, SHEFEX II was launched from the same launch station, the Andøya Rocket Range in Norway. It reached a height of about 180 kilometers and a speed of about 11,000 kilometers per hour (eleven times the speed of sound). The rocket used was the Brazilian VS-40. During its re-entry, SHEFEX II survived temperatures above 2500 °C, while sending data from the 300 different sensors to the ground station.

== SHEFEX III ==
SHEFEX III is a small space plane-like vehicle. It should fly even faster and stay in the air for 15 minutes, far longer than the previous two experiments. Its launch is expected in the 2020s on a Brazilian VLM rocket.

== REX Free Flyer (SHEFEX IV) ==
The REX-Free Flyer is planned as a first application of the experience collected from SHEFEX. This system should serve as a free-flying platform for high quality microgravity experiments over several days. The possibility of controlled return and a modular design of the experiment trays, that closely resemble those found on sounding rockets, should give experimenters quick and inexpensive access to their experiments.
