= Department of Aerospace Science and Technology =

Brazilian aerospace military research department

Coordinates: 23°12′34.78″S 45°52′17.18″W

Department of Science and Aerospace Technology
- Departamento de Ciência e Tecnologia Aeroespacial
- Part of Brazilian Air Force
- São José dos Campos, São Paulo

Site information
- Type: Research Center
- Controlled by: Brazilian Air Force
- Website: www.cta.br

Site history
- In use: 1953 - present

The Brazilian Department of Science and Aerospace Technology (Portuguese: Departamento de Ciência e Tecnologia Aeroespacial; DCTA) is the national military research center for aviation and space flight. It is subordinated to the Brazilian Air Force (FAB).

It coordinates all technical and scientific activities related to the aerospace sector in which there are interests by the Ministry of Defense. It was established in 1953. It currently employs several thousand civilian and military personnel.

== Institutes ==
The DCTA has four institutes within its campus.

=== Aeronautics and Space Institute (IAE) ===
Aeronautics and Space Institute (Instituto de Aeronaútica e Espaço). It develops projects in the aeronautical, airspace and defense sectors, co-responsible for the execution of the Brazilian Space Mission.

=== Aeronautics Institute of Technology (ITA) ===
Aeronautics Institute of Technology (Instituto Tecnológico de Aeronáutica) is one of the main educational colleges of the Brazilian Air Force.

=== Institute for Advanced Studies (IEAv) ===
Institute for Advanced Studies (Instituto de Estudos Avançados). Responsible for the development of pure and applied sciences: photonics, nuclear energy, applied physics, remote sensor systems and decision support systems. In 2006, the IEAv inaugurated the T3 Hypersonic wind tunnel, the largest in Latin America.

=== Industrial Promotion and Coordination Institute (IFI) ===
Industrial Promotion and Coordination Institute (Instituto de Fomento e Coodernação Industrial). It provides military aeronautical certification and aerospace equipment approval, acting as an interface between the institutes and the industry. Until 2006, it carried out the civil aircraft certification activities, today under the National Civil Aviation Agency responsibilities.

=== Flight Testing and Research Institute (IPEV) ===
Flight Testing and Research Institute (Instituto de Pesquisas e Ensaios em Voo). This institute is responsible for the instruction and fulfillment of flight testing campaigns (founded 1953). IPEV has a dedicated Air Force Squadron, based at CTA using the A-29A Super Tucano, C-95BM & CM Bandeirante, and the C-97 Brasília.

== Museum ==
The DCTA is also responsible managing for the Brazilian Aerospace Memorial (Memorial Aerospacial Brasileiro - MAB). It is located in São José dos Campos, São Paulo, Brazil.

== See also ==
- Brazilian Organization for the Development of Aeronautical Certification
- Brazilian Space Agency
- Brazilian space program
- Brazilian National Institute for Space Research
- Instituto Tecnológico de Aeronáutica
- Institute of Aeronautics and Space
- List of aerospace flight test centres
- Marcos Pontes, the first Brazilian in space
