= Canopus 2 =

Argentine sub-orbital sounding rocket

Canopus 2 was a single stage, sub-orbital sounding rocket that was built by Argentina.

== Canopus 1 ==
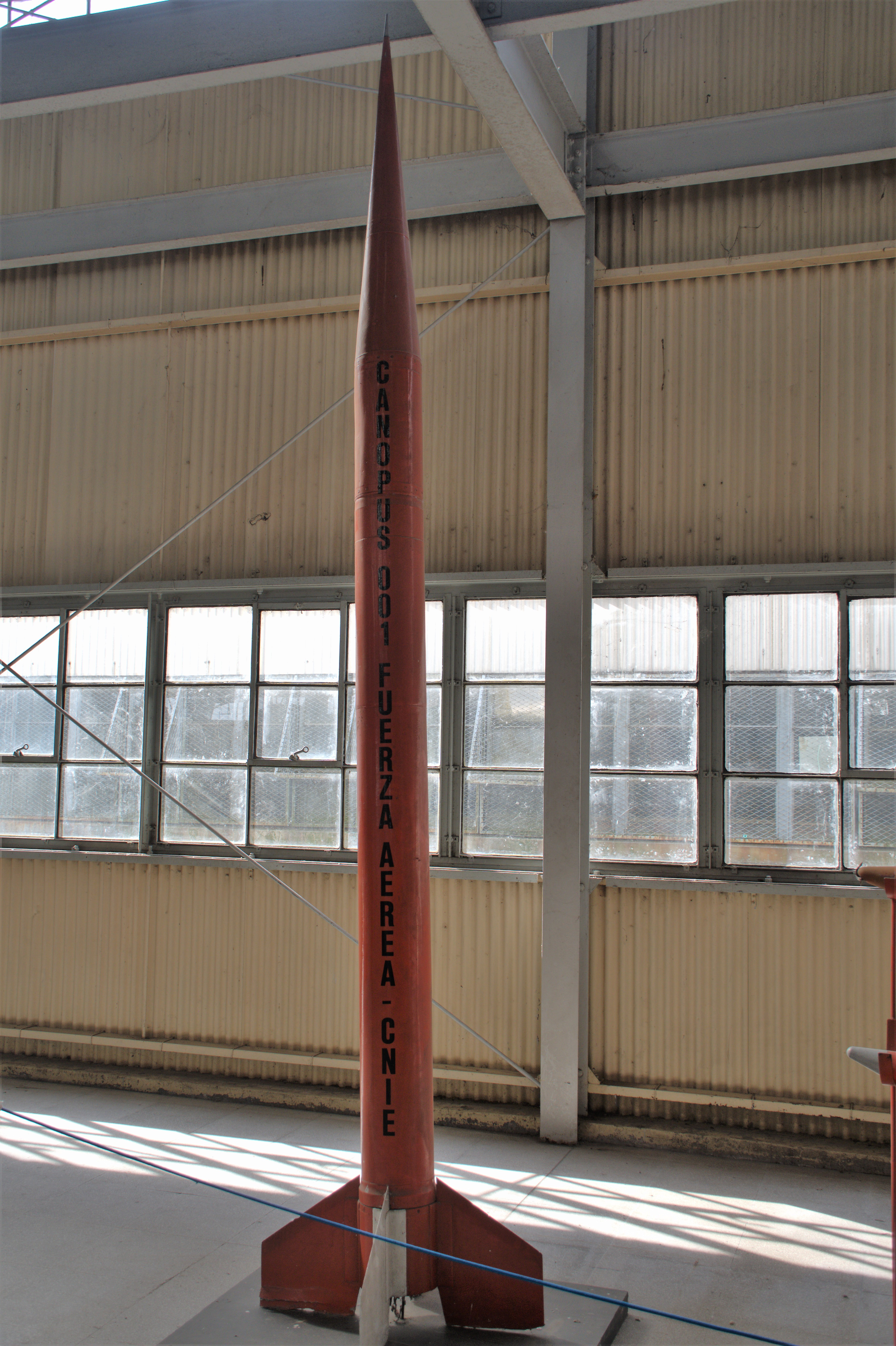
Canopus 1 at Museo Nacional de Aeronáutica

A first version, Canopus 1, was tested between 1966 and 1967. Canopus 1 was also used as the first stage of the Rigel sounding rocket between 1969 and 1973.

=== Launches ===
Canopus 1 was launched two times from CELPA Chamical:

Date	Mission Type	Nation	Apogee
November 1966	Test mission	Argentina	40 km
July 1967	Test mission	Argentina	40 km

== Canopus 2 ==
Canopus 2 diagram

Canopus 2 was introduced in 1969. There were a total of three launches during 1969 from CELPA Chamical and CELPA Mar Chiquita with no failures. Another launch happened in 1971 from CELPA Chamical. The launch apogee was 150 kilometres in altitude. The vehicle had a length of 4 metres and launch mass of 300 kilograms. It was capable of lifting a 50 kg payload to an altitude of 100 km, and on some flights had an apogee of 150 kilometres.

Canopus 2 was also used for both stages of Castor A and the second stage of Tauro sounding rocket.

=== Launches ===
Canopus 2 was launched four times:

Date	Mission Type	Nation	Apogee
1969 April 16	Test mission	Argentina	150 km (90 mi)
1969 October 23	Test mission	Argentina	150 km (90 mi)
1969 December 23	Test / biology mission	Argentina	150 km (90 mi)
1971 November 5		Argentina	
