= Castor A =

Argentine sounding rocket

Castor
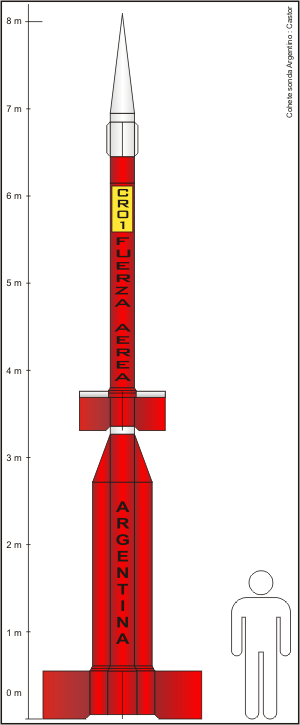
- Function: Sounding rocket
- Manufacturer: Instituto de Investigaciones Aeronáuticas y Espaciales (IIAE)
- Country of origin: Argentina

Size
- Height: 8 m (26 ft)
- Diameter: 0.69 m (2 ft 3 in)
- Stages: 2

Launch history
- Launch sites: CELPA Chamical, Vice Commodore Marambio Base, Chilca
- Total launches: 7
- Success(es): 6
- Failure: 1
- First flight: December 22, 1969
- Last flight: March 22, 1979

stage – First Stage
- Powered by: 4 Canopus II

stage – Second Stage
- Powered by: 1 Canopus II

The Castor A was an Argentine sounding rocket designed in 1969 by the Instituto de Investigaciones Aeronáuticas y Espaciales (IIAE).

The rocket featured a two-stage configuration, utilizing five Canopus II rockets (four in the first stage and one in the second). It was capable of placing a 75 kg (165 lb) payload at a 400 km altitude.

Throughout its operational lifespan, the Castor A was launched seven times. Experiencing one failed launch, it had a success rate of approximately 83.3%.

== Launches ==
Castor was launched seven times:

| Date | Mission Type | Nation | Agency | Apogee | Launch site |
|---|---|---|---|---|---|
| December 22, 1969 | Test mission | Argentina | IIAE | 52 km | CELPA Chamical |
| December 19, 1970 | Test mission | Argentina | IIAE | 45 km | CELPA Chamical |
| November 22, 1973 | Ion beam Ionosphere mission | Germany | MPE | 406 km | CELPA Chamical |
| September 30, 1975 | Ionosphere mission | Germany | MPE | 400 km | Vice Commodore Marambio Base, Antarctica |
| October 3, 1975 | Ionosphere mission | Germany | MPE | 400 km | Vice Commodore Marambio Base, Antarctica |
| March 21, 1979, 11:49 PM | Spread F Barium release mission | Germany | DFVLR | Failure | Chilca, Peru |
| March 22, 1979, 11:59 PM | Spread F Barium release mission | Germany | DFVLR | 268 km | Chilca, Peru |

== Specifications ==
- Apogee: 400 km
- Total mass: 355 kg
- Diameter: 69 cm
- Length: 8 m

== Images ==
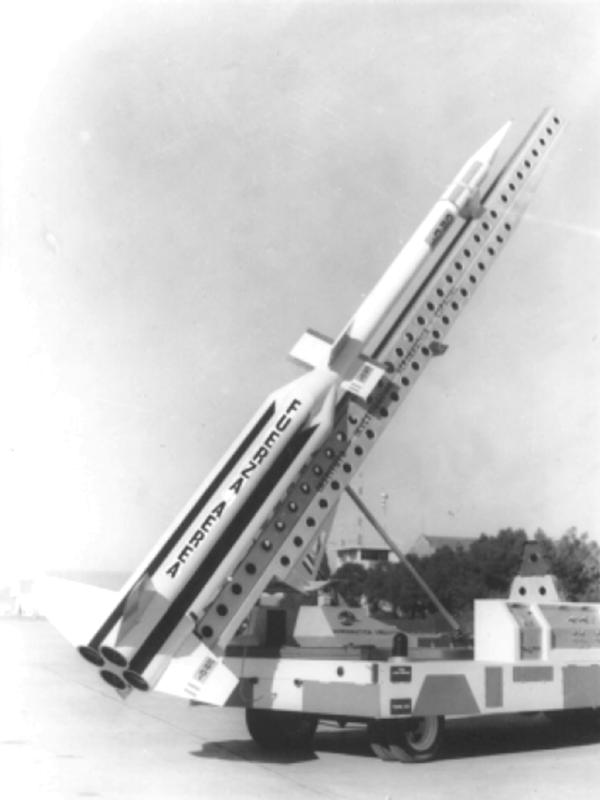
First Castor (CRX-01) at CELPA Chamical

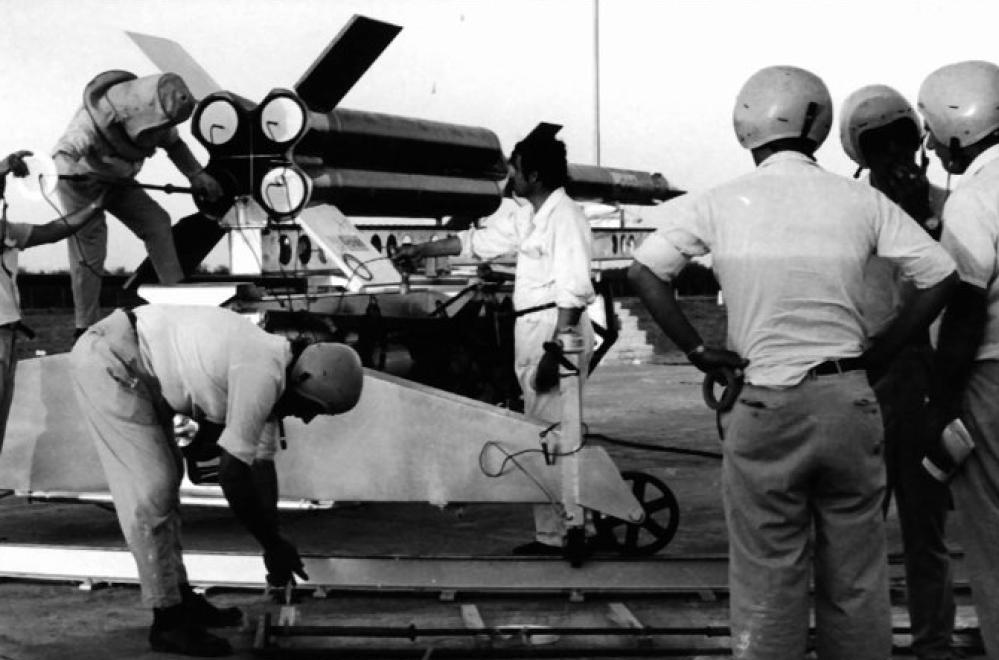
Castor launch preparations
