= Barreira do Inferno Launch Center =

Satellite launching facility of the Brazilian Space Agency

Barreira do Inferno Launch Center Centro de Lançamento da Barreira do Inferno
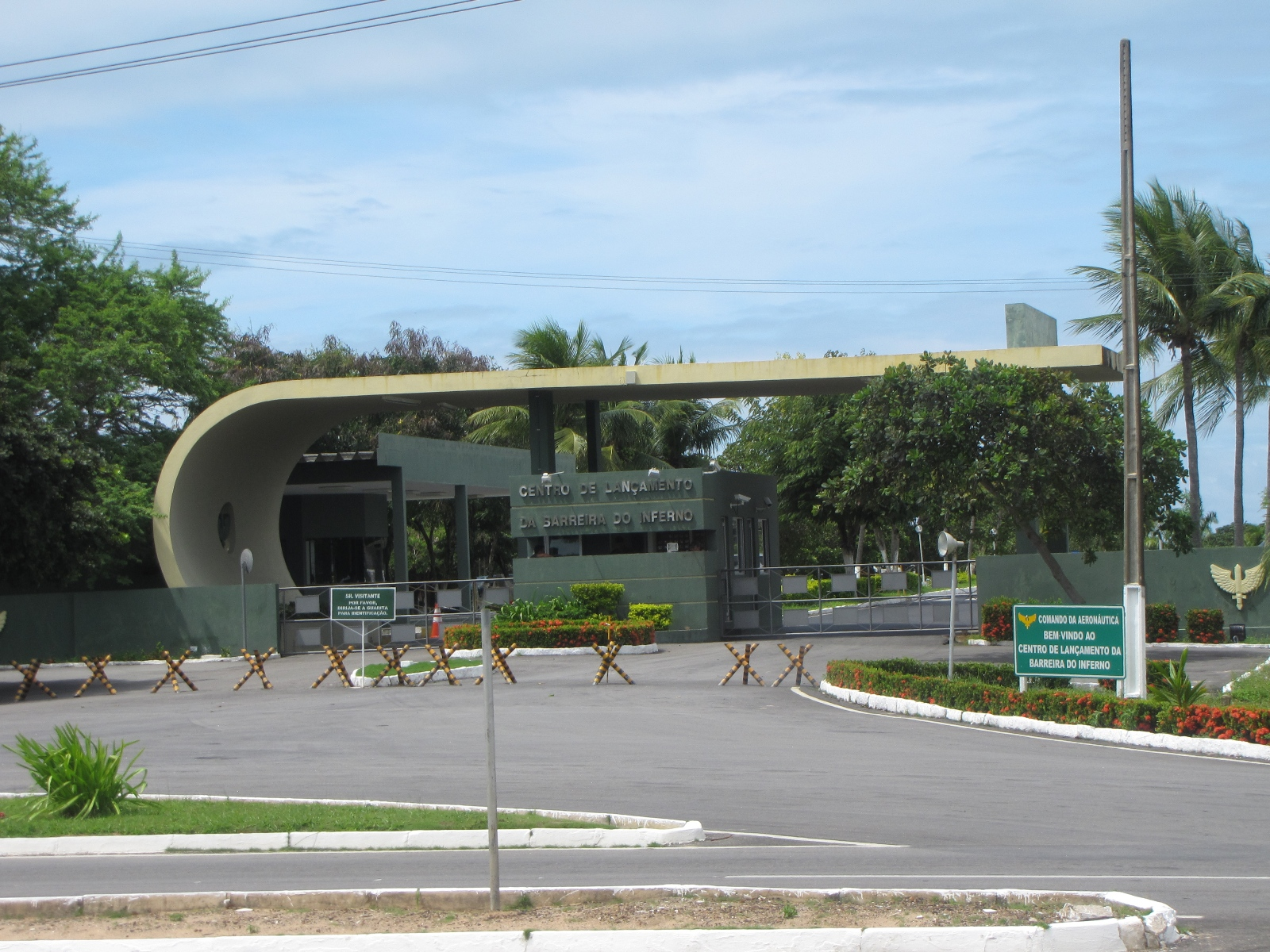

- Location in Rio Grande do Norte
- IATA: none; ICAO: none

Summary
- Airport type: Military base; Spaceport
- Operator: Brazilian Air Force; Brazilian Space Agency
- Location: Parnamirim, Rio Grande do Norte, Brazil
- Built: 1965
- In use: 1965–2007
- Coordinates: 05°55′30″S 035°09′47″W
- Interactive map of Barreira do Inferno Launch Center

The Barreira do Inferno Launch Center (Portuguese: Centro de Lançamento da Barreira do Inferno; CLBI, transl. 'Hell's Barrier') is a rocket launch base of the Brazilian Space Agency. It was created in 1965, and is located near Ponta Negra beach, near Natal, the capital of the state of Rio Grande do Norte. It has been used for 233 launches from 1965 to 2007, reaching up to 1100 kilometers in altitude.

It provides tracking support for launches from the Alcântara Launch Center and Guiana Space Centre.

== Launches ==
The following rockets have been launched from CLBI:

- Aerobee 150
- Javelin
- Black Brant 4A
- Black Brant 4B
- Black Brant 5C
- Black Brant 8B
- Boosted Dart
- Castor Lance
- Cuckoo 4
- Loki-Dart
- Nike-Apache
- Nike-Cajun
- Nike-Iroquois
- Nike Orion
- Nike-Tomahawk
- Orion
- Paiute Tomahawk
- PESL
- Rocketsonde
- Skylark 12
- Sonda 3
- Sonda 4
- Super Arcas
- VLS-R1
- VS-30

== Gallery ==
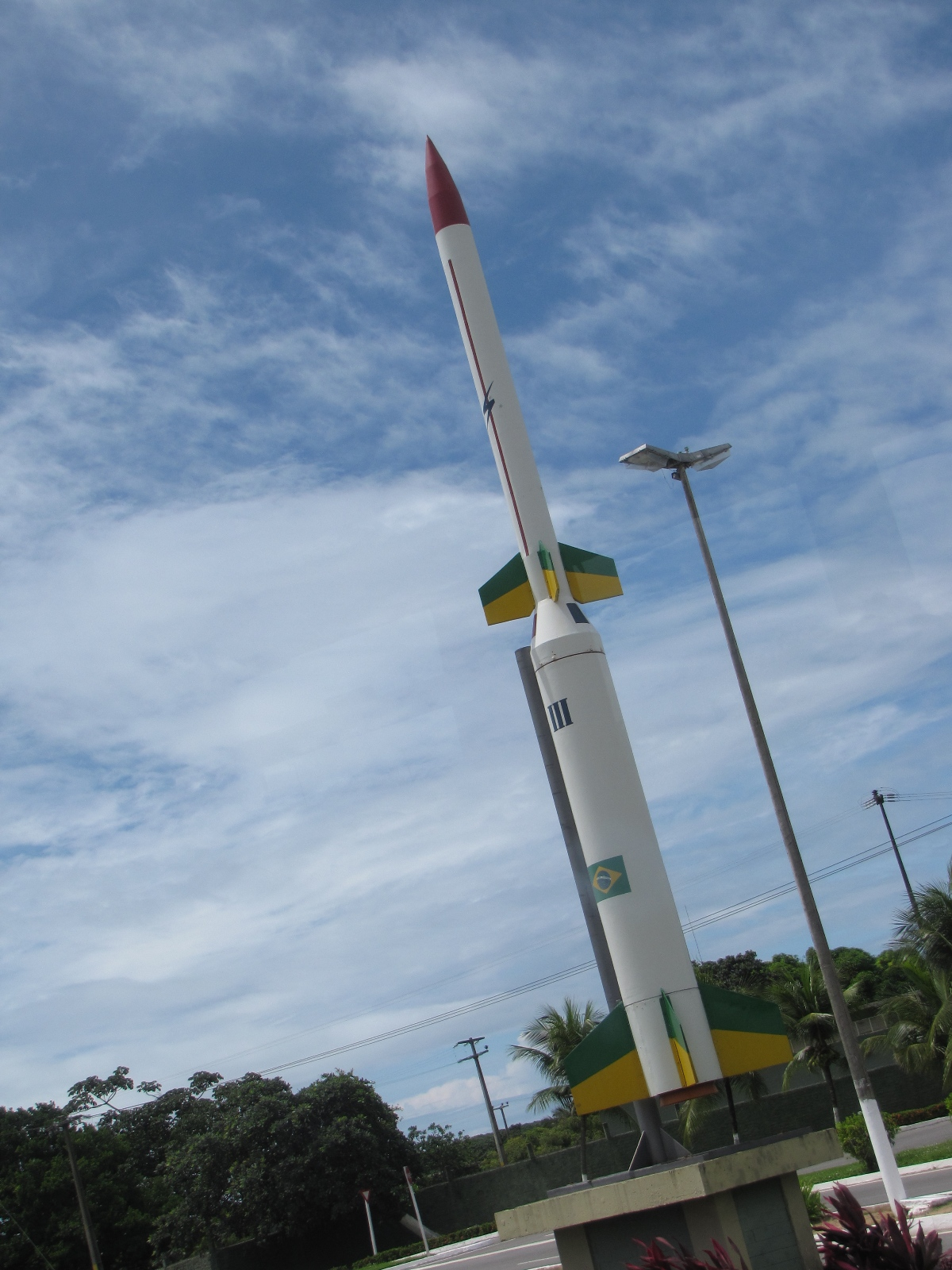
Rocket display at Barreira do Inferno

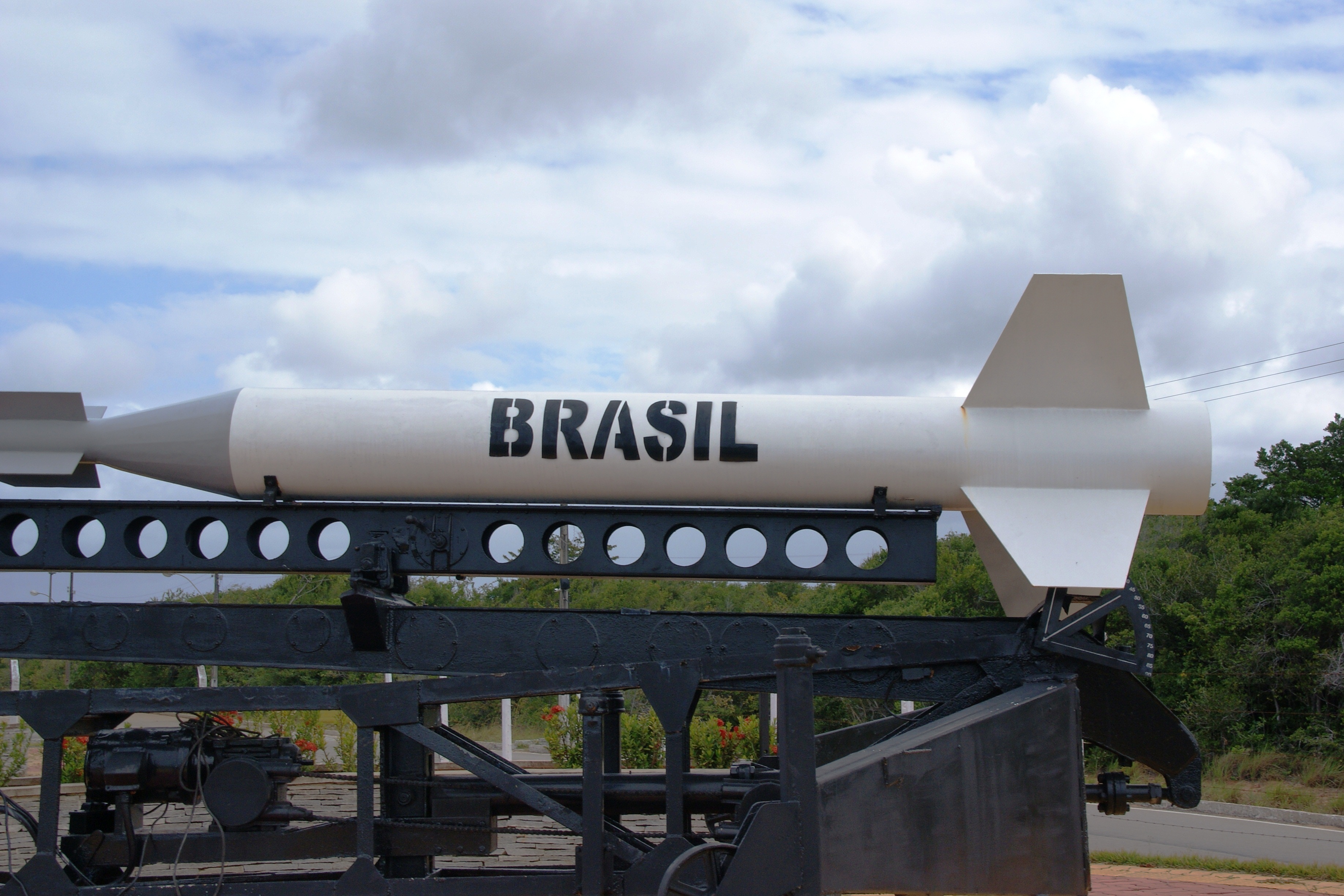
Air Defence Museum, Barreira do Inferno

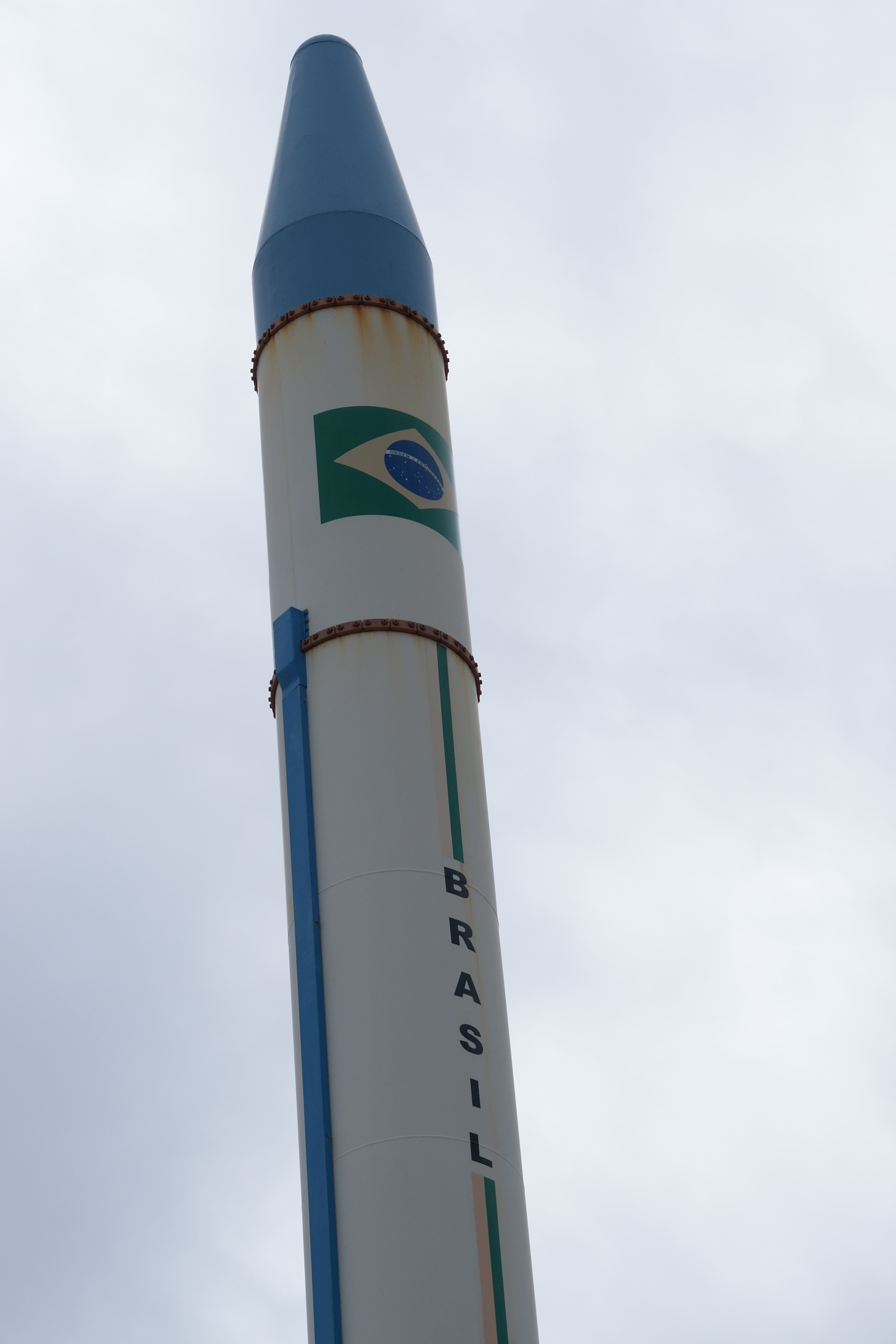
Air Defence Museum, Barreira do Inferno

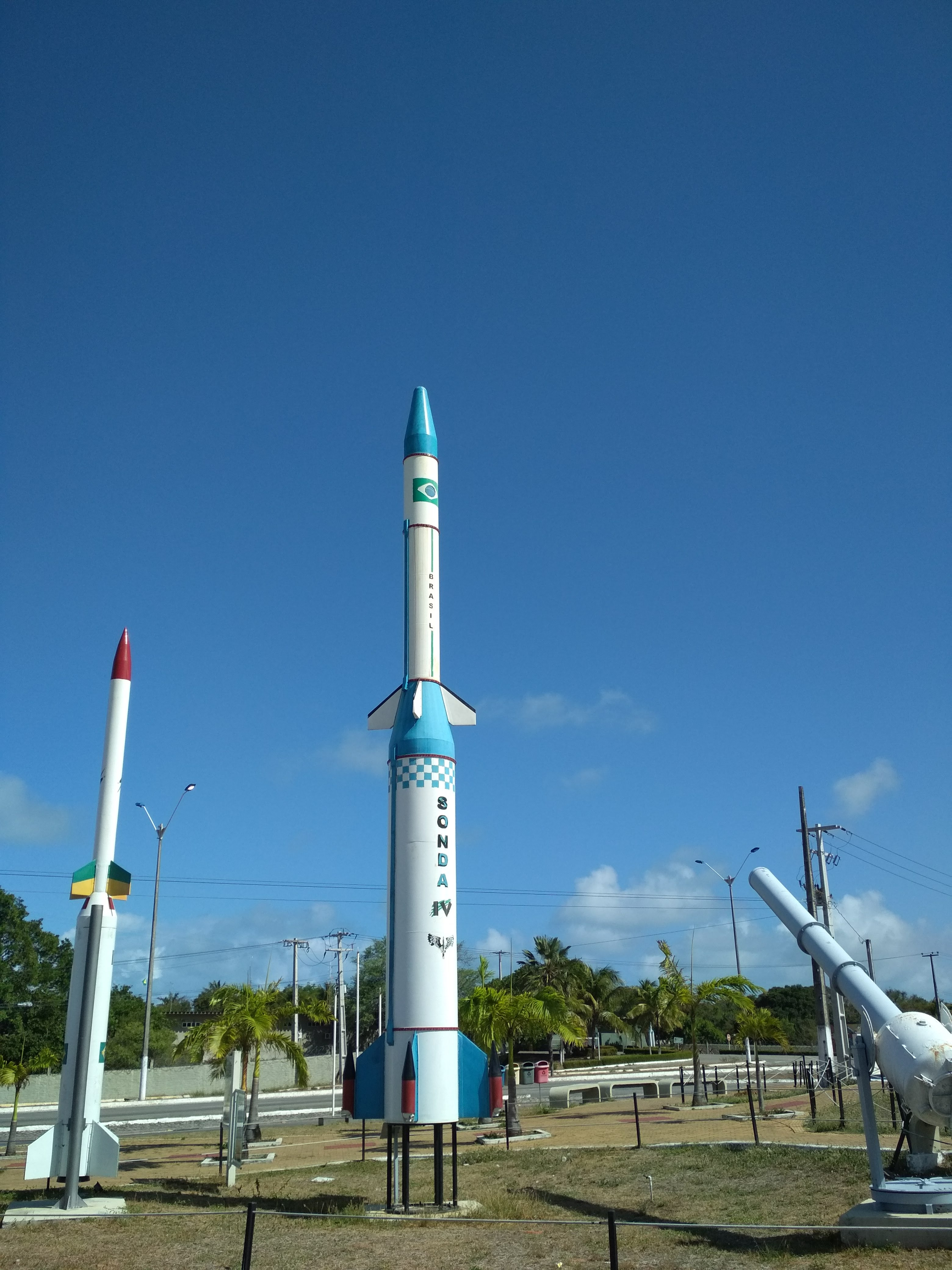
Rocket displays at Barreira do Inferno Launch Center

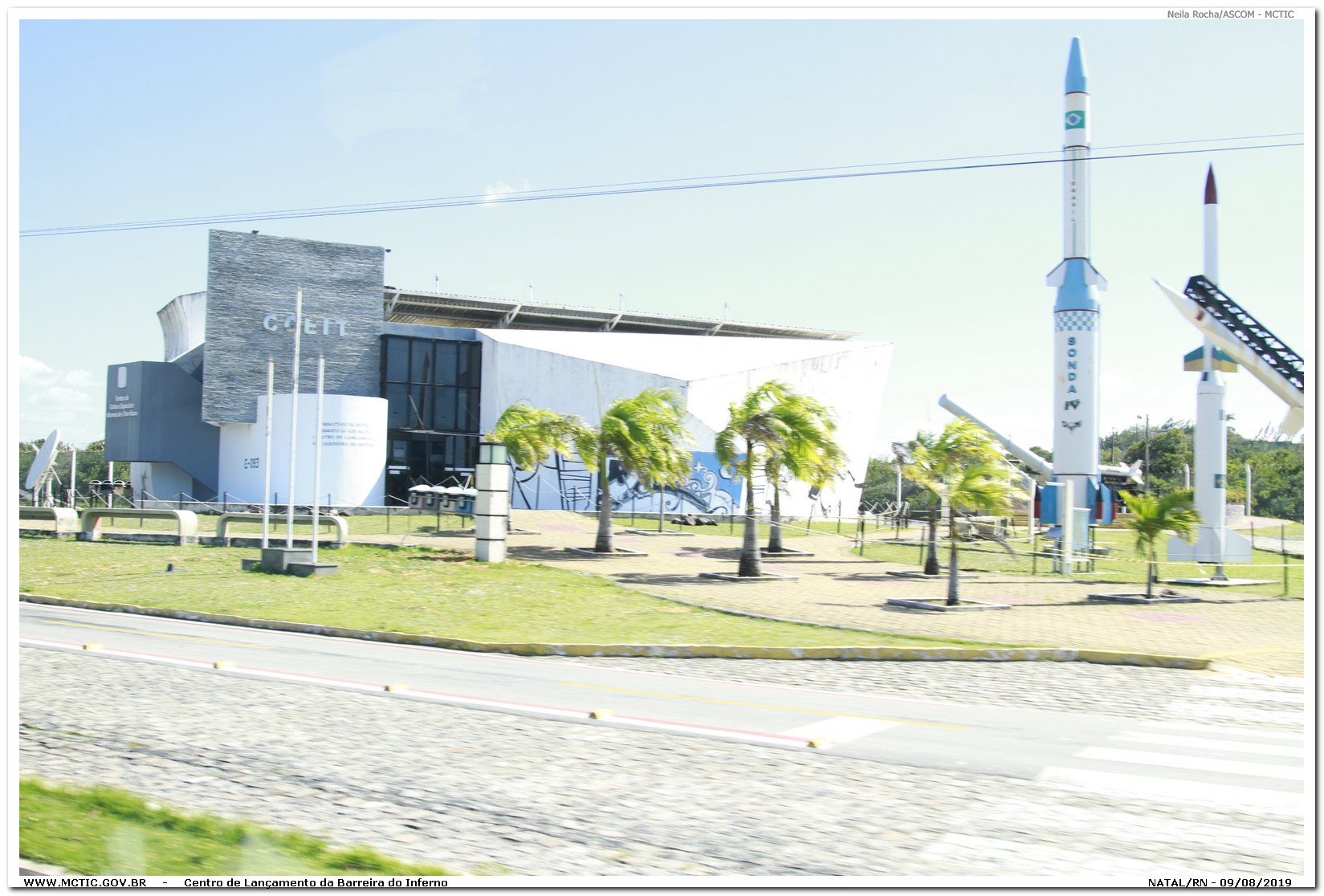
Barreira do Inferno Launch Center complex

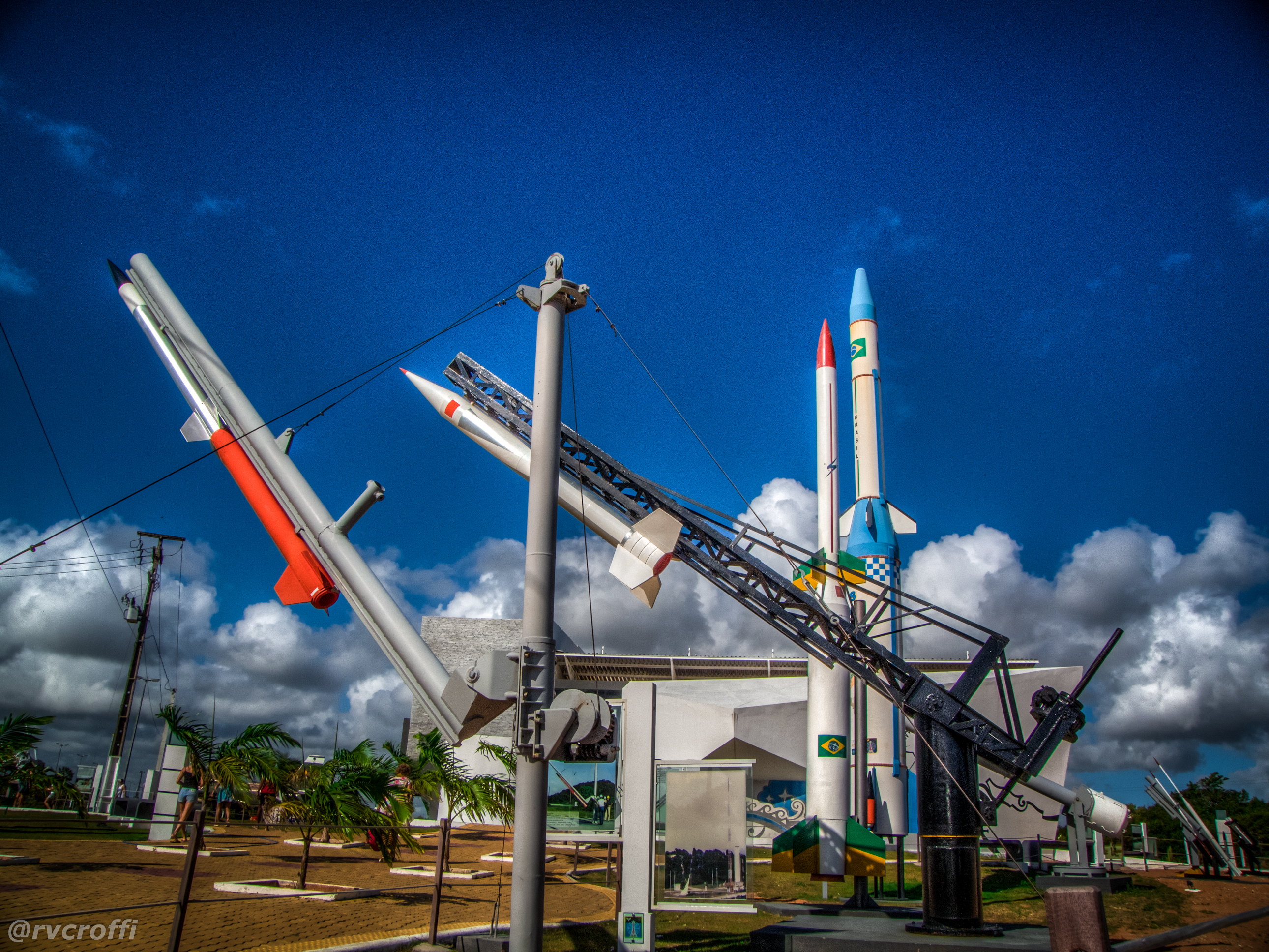
Rocket displays at Barreira do Inferno Launch Center

Launch of a Black Brant rocket in 1973 from Barreira do Inferno
