= Tauro (rocket) =

Argentinian sounding rocket

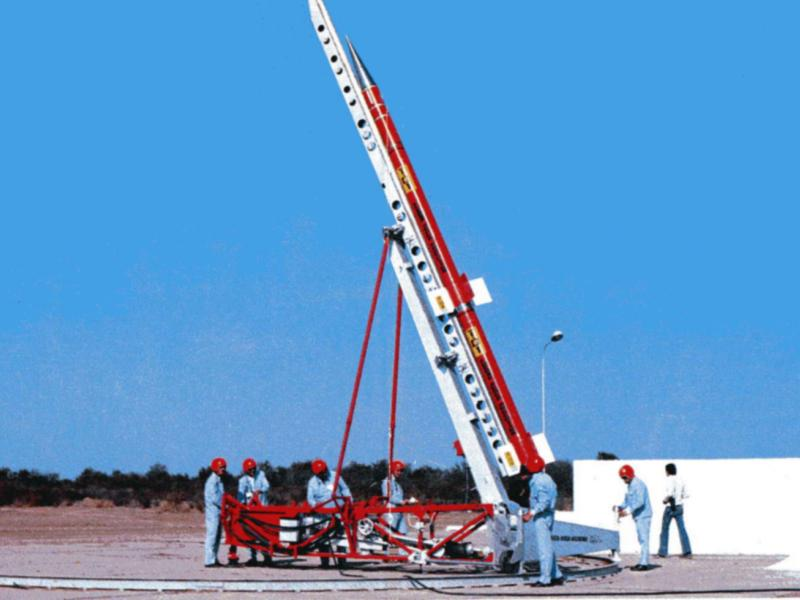
- Tauro T-01 rocket at CELPA, Chamical
- Function: sounding rocket
- Manufacturer: Instituto de Investigaciones Aeronáuticas y Espaciales (IIAE)
- Country of origin: Argentina

Size
- Height: 7.6 m (25 ft)
- Diameter: 0.28 m (11 in)
- Mass: 1,200 kg (2,600 lb)
- Stages: 2

Capacity

Launch history
- Launch sites: CELPA Chamical
- Total launches: 9
- First flight: July 1977
- Last flight: December 10, 1981

First stage - Canopus 2
- Burn time: 18 seconds
- Propellant: solid

Second stage Canopus 2
- Burn time: 18 seconds
- Propellant: solid

Tauro was an Argentinian sounding rocket developed in 1977. It was a two-stage solid fuel rocket (two Canopus stages), used between 1977 and 1981.

== Description ==
Built by Instituto de Investigaciones Aeronáuticas y Espaciales (IIAE), it was capable of sending a 100 kg payload to an altitude of 120 km. Both stages burned a polyurethane composite and had a diameter of 28 cm. Total weight of Tauro was 1200 kg with a length of 7.6 m.

== Launches ==
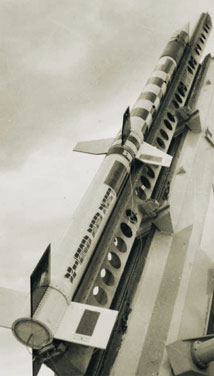
Tauro on launch ramp at CELPA, Chamical, February 11, 1979

Tauro was launched nine times from CELPA (Centro de Ensayo y Lanzamiento de Proyectiles Autopropulsados), Chamical.

The first Tauro (Tauro T-01) was launched in July 1977. A second rocket (Tauro T-02) was launched on February 2, 1979.

The last flight (Tauro T-09) happened on December 10, 1981, equipped with cameras for earth surface photography from high altitudes. The photographic payload was successfully recovered.
