= Rigel (rocket) =

Argentine sounding rocket

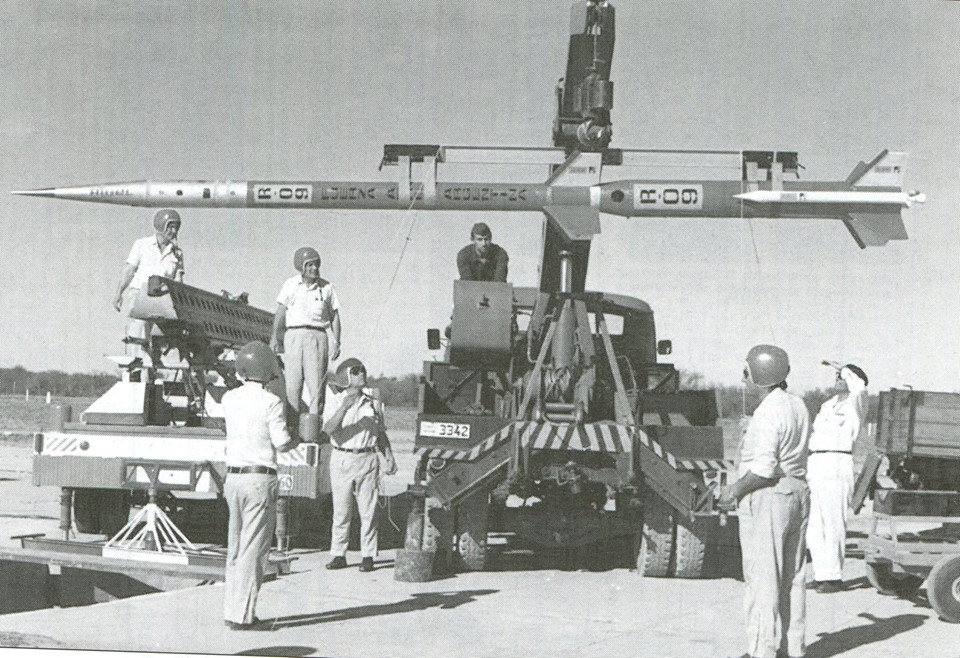
- Rigel rocket launch, December 16, 1967
- Function: sounding rocket
- Country of origin: Argentina

Size
- Height: 6.3 m (21 ft)
- Diameter: 0.228 m (9.0 in)
- Mass: 300 kg (660 lb)
- Stages: 2

Capacity

Launch history
- Launch sites: CELPA Chamical
- First flight: 1967
- Last flight: 1974

First stage - Canopus 1
- Burn time: 12 seconds
- Propellant: Solid

Second stage Orion-2
- Thrust: 55 kg
- Burn time: 12 seconds
- Propellant: Solid

Rigel was an Argentine two-stage sounding rocket used between 1967 and 1974, featuring a Canopus 1 first stage and an Orion-2 second stage. Designed for atmospheric and ionospheric research, it had a mass of 300 kg, a length of 6.3 meters, a diameter of 0.228 metres, and could reach altitudes up to 310 km.

Seven launches were conducted, including experiments for atmospheric studies and barium releases to study ionospheric phenomena. Launches took place at CELPA and included both test and scientific missions.

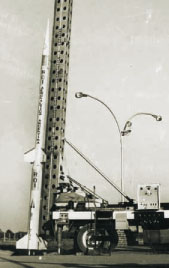
Rigel sounding rocket

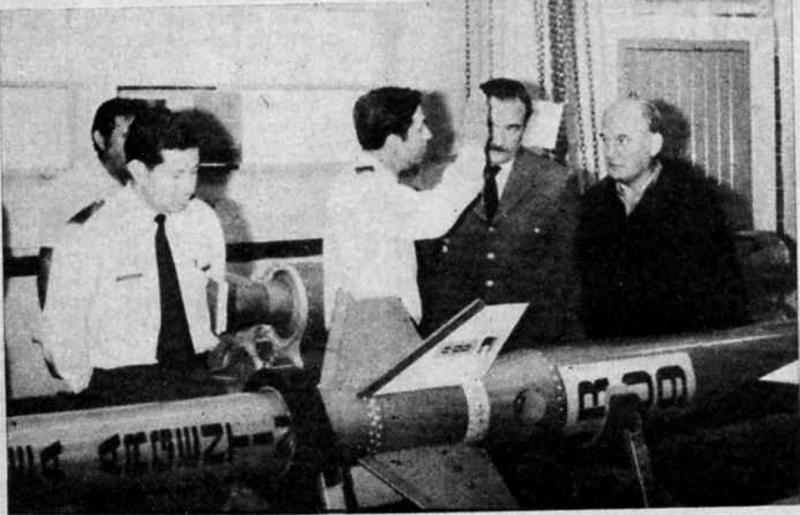
Rigel R-09 sounding rocket

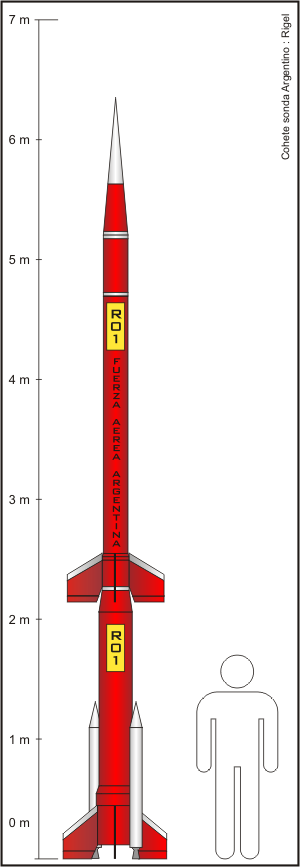
Rigel sounding rocket

== Launches ==
Rigel was launched from CELPA between 1967 and 1974. The following table on launches, compiled from the available sources, is incomplete:

Rigel flights
Date	Mission Type	Apogee
1967 December 16	Test flight	
1969 September 12	Test flight	250 km (150 mi)
1969 December 22	Test flight	250 km (150 mi)
1972 November 2	MPE Barium release, EXP 63 Aeronomy / ionosphere mission	240 km (140 mi)
1972 November 4	MPE Barium release, EXP 64 Aeronomy / ionosphere mission	252 km (156 mi)
1972 November 11	MPE Barium release, EXP 65 Ionosphere mission	260 km (160 mi)
1973 November 18	Ionosphere mission, second stage test	250 km (150 mi)
1973 November 19	Ionosphere mission	260 km (160 mi)
1974 July 4	Operativo Astro X	
1974 July 18	Operativo Astro X	
