= Mar Chiquita =

Coastal lagoon in the southeast province of Buenos Aires in eastern Argentina

Coordinates: 37°44′45″S 57°25′39″W

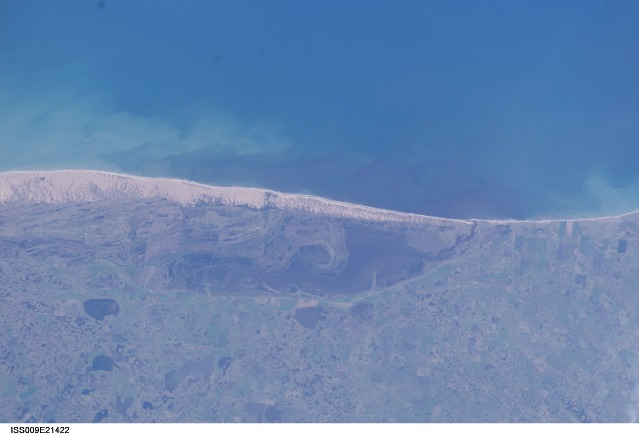
- Interactive map of Mar Chiquita
- Location: southeast province of Buenos Aires in eastern Argentina
- Area: 560.3 square kilometres (216.3 sq mi)
- Designated: 1995
- World Heritage site: UNESCO Biosphere Reserve

Mar Chiquita is a coastal lagoon in the southeast province of Buenos Aires in eastern Argentina. It is located by within the Atlantic Coast, 30 km north of Mar del Plata.

The area is a natural reserve where a number of animal species live around Mar Chiquita. There is a small resort on the southern side of the lagoon with population of 487 people as of 2010.

The location was also used as a suborbital launch site at coordinates 37°45' south, 57°25' west between 1968 and 1972; eight sounding rockets of the types Arcas, two rockets of the type Orion-1, and a rocket of the type Dragon, were launched from the site.

Mar Chiquita was designated a Biosphere Reserve by UNESCO in 1995. It was designated a wildlife refuge in 1998 by the Government of Argentina. The refuge covers an area of 560.3 km^{2}.

== See also ==
- CELPA (Mar Chiquita)
- Rocket launch sites
