= Sonda (rocket) =

Family of sounding rockets

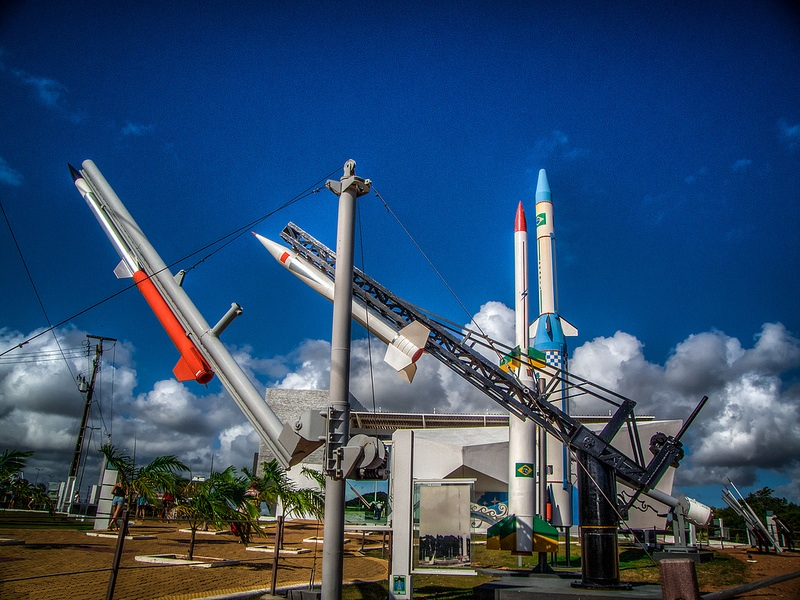
Sonda rockets family portrait

Side-by-side comparison of Sonda rockets, to scale

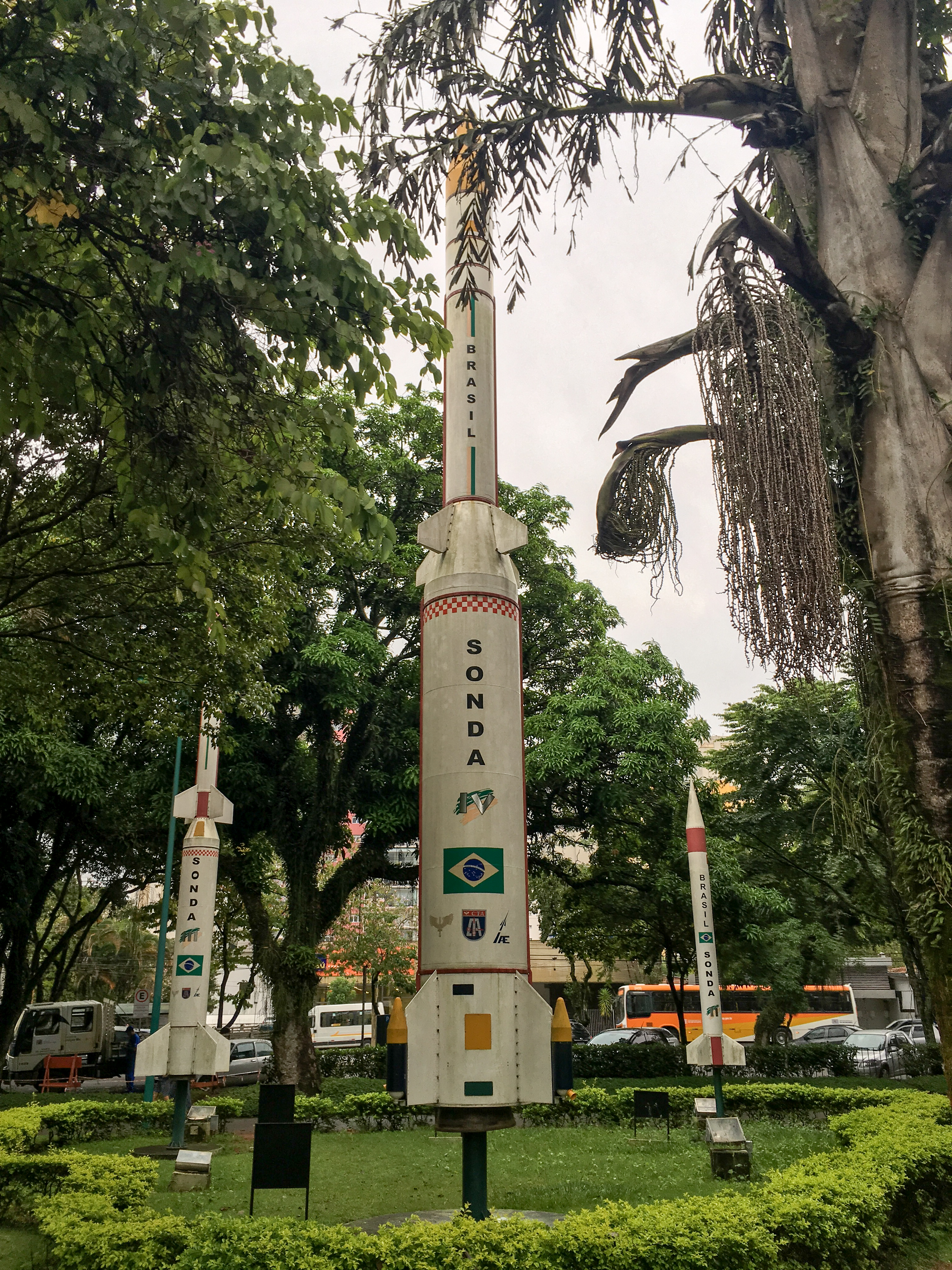
Sonda II, III and IV on display at Parque Santos Dumont

Sonda ("Probe" in English) is a family of Brazilian-built sounding rockets which serves as an R&D path to the VLS (Portuguese: Veículo Lançador de Satélites) orbital rocket. Launches started in 1965 and continue to this day. Launch sites include Wallops Island, Andøya, Kiruna, Natal, Alcântara, Cassino and SvalRak.

== Sonda I ==
The Sonda I is a two stage rocket (S-10-1 & S-10-2 rocket stages) with a maximum flight altitude of 65 km, a liftoff thrust of 27 kN a total mass of 100 kg, a diameter of 11 cm and a length of 4.5 metres. It was launched 9 times between 1965 and 1966.

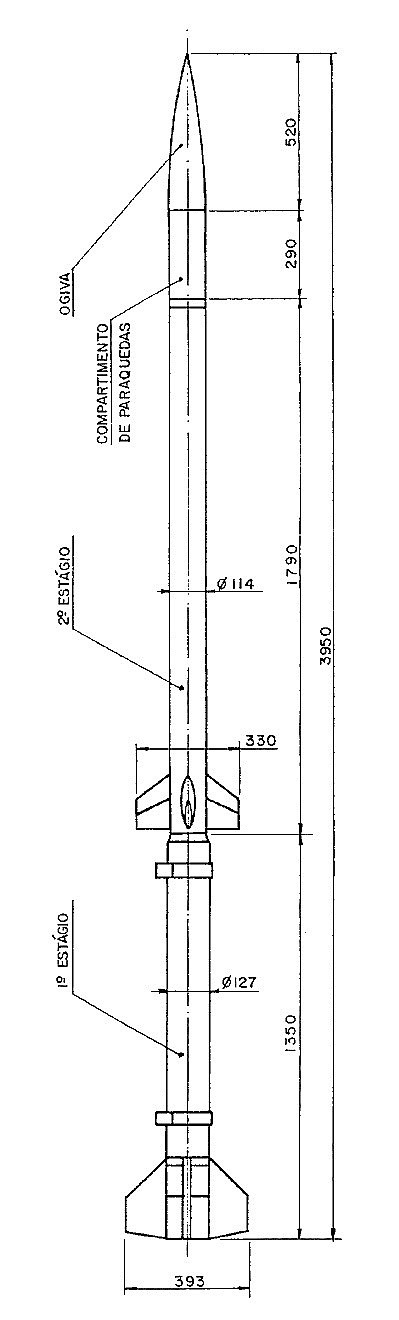
Diagram with Sonda I rocket dimensions

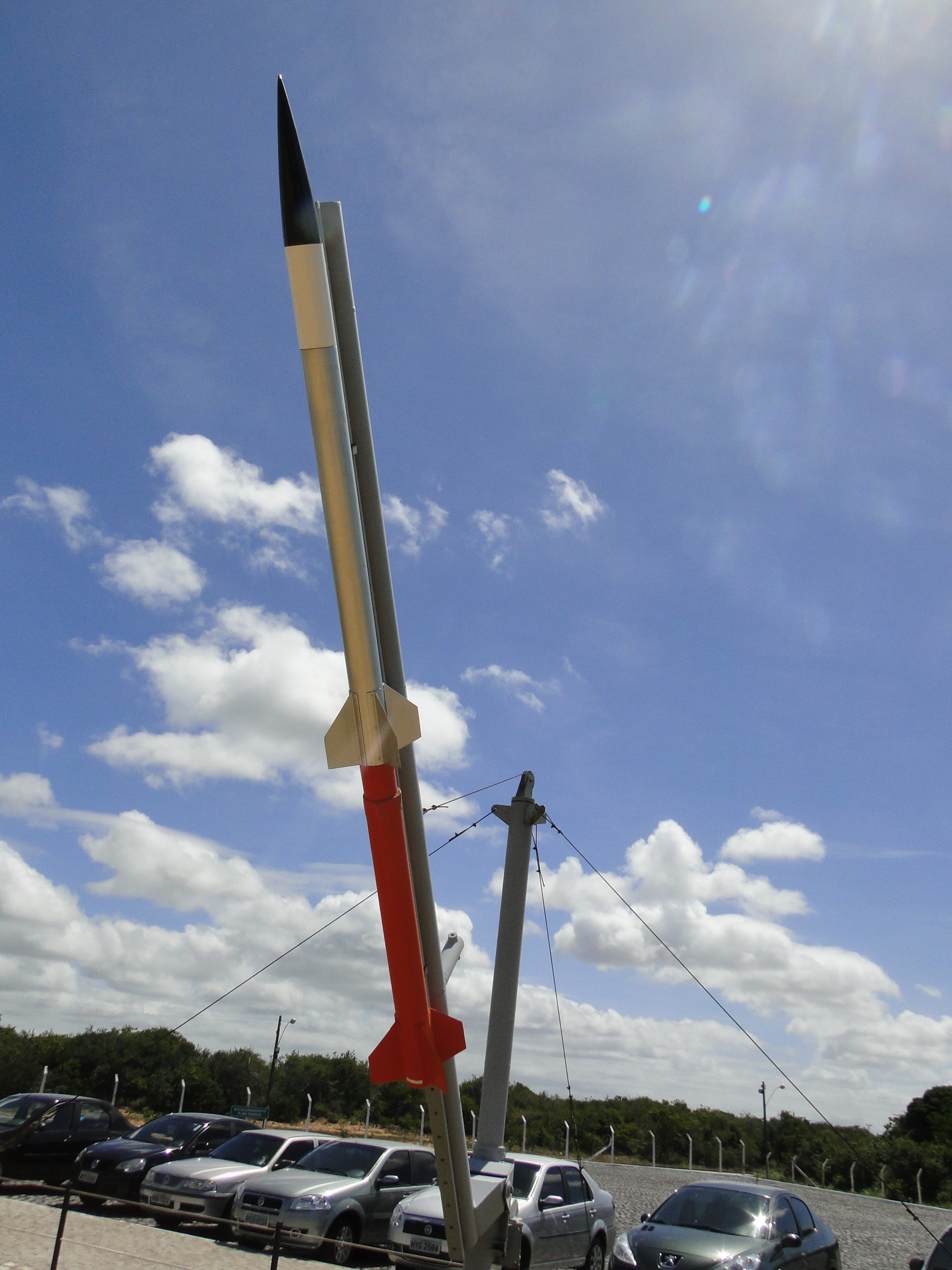
Sonda I on display

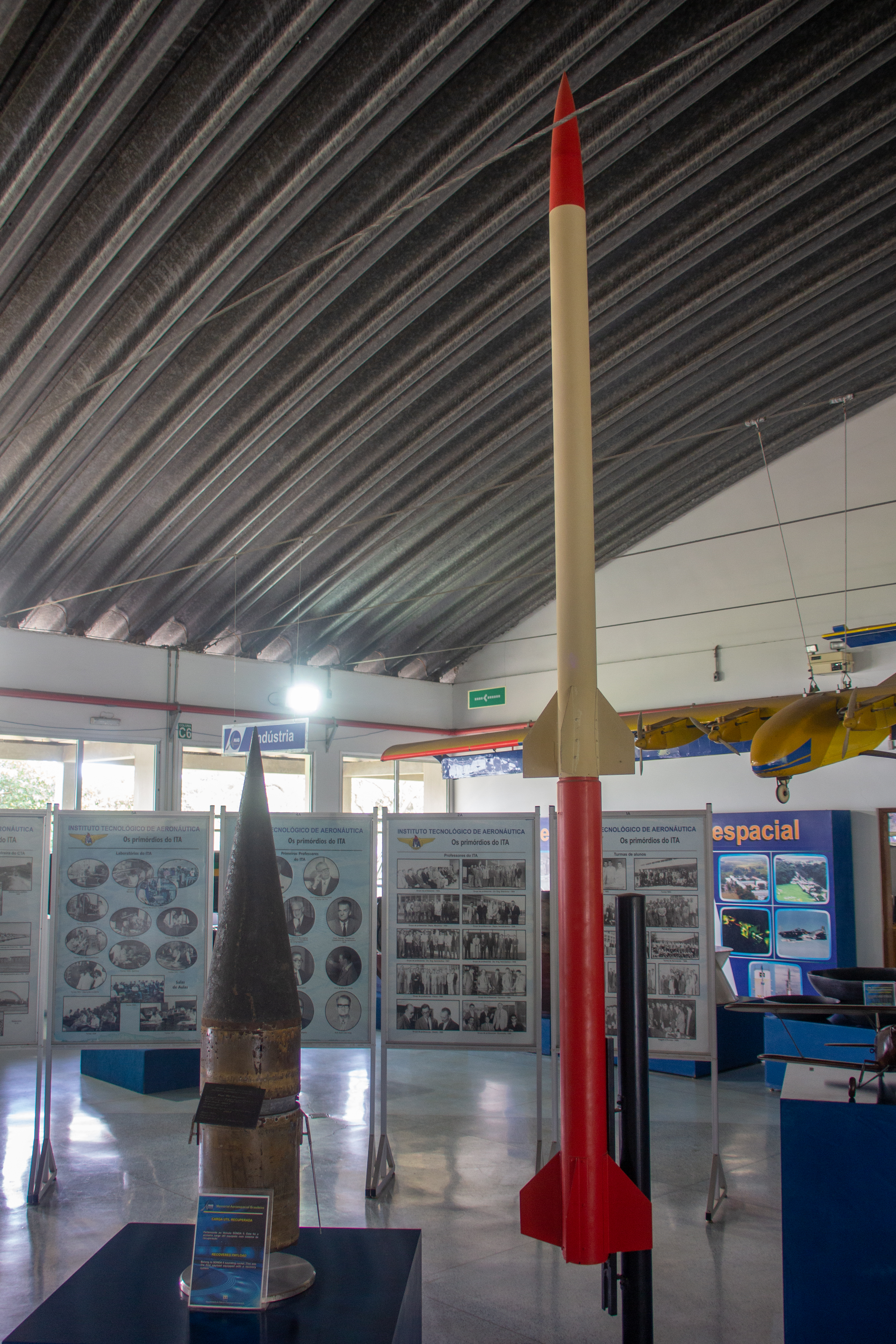
Sonda 1 (right) at Memorial Aeroespacial Brasileiro

== Sonda II ==
The Sonda II is a single stage rocket (S-20 rocket stage) with a maximum flight altitude of 180 km, a liftoff thrust of 36 kN, a total mass of 400 kg, a core diameter of 0.30 m and a total length of 5.60 m. It was launched 7 times between 1990 and 1996.

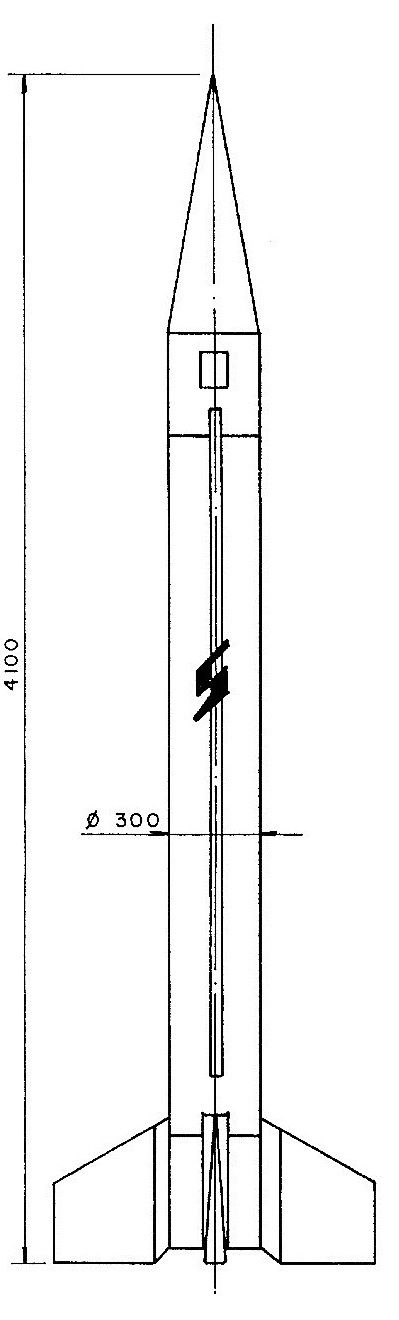
Diagram with Sonda II rocket dimensions

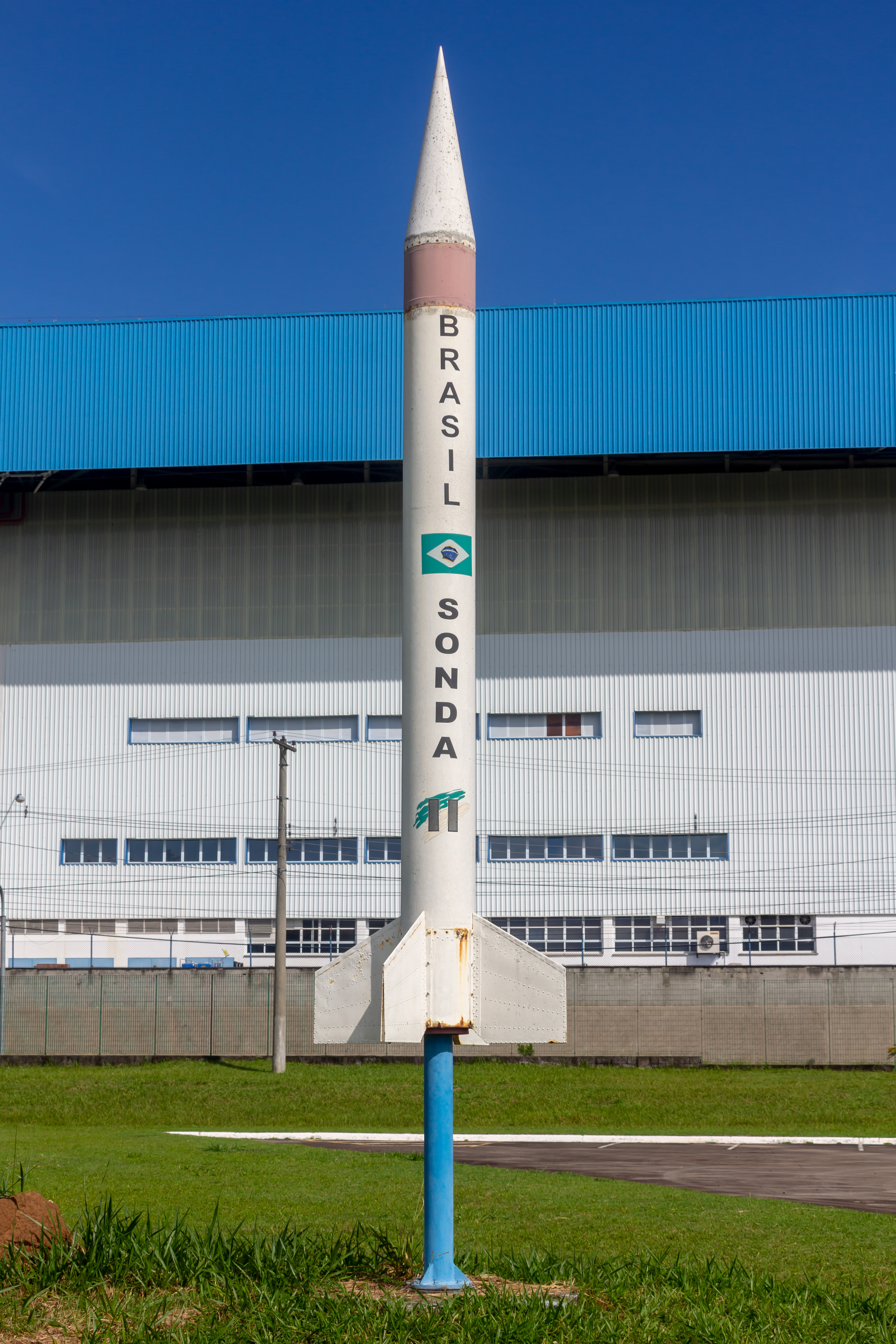
Sonda II at Memorial Aeroespacial Brasileiro

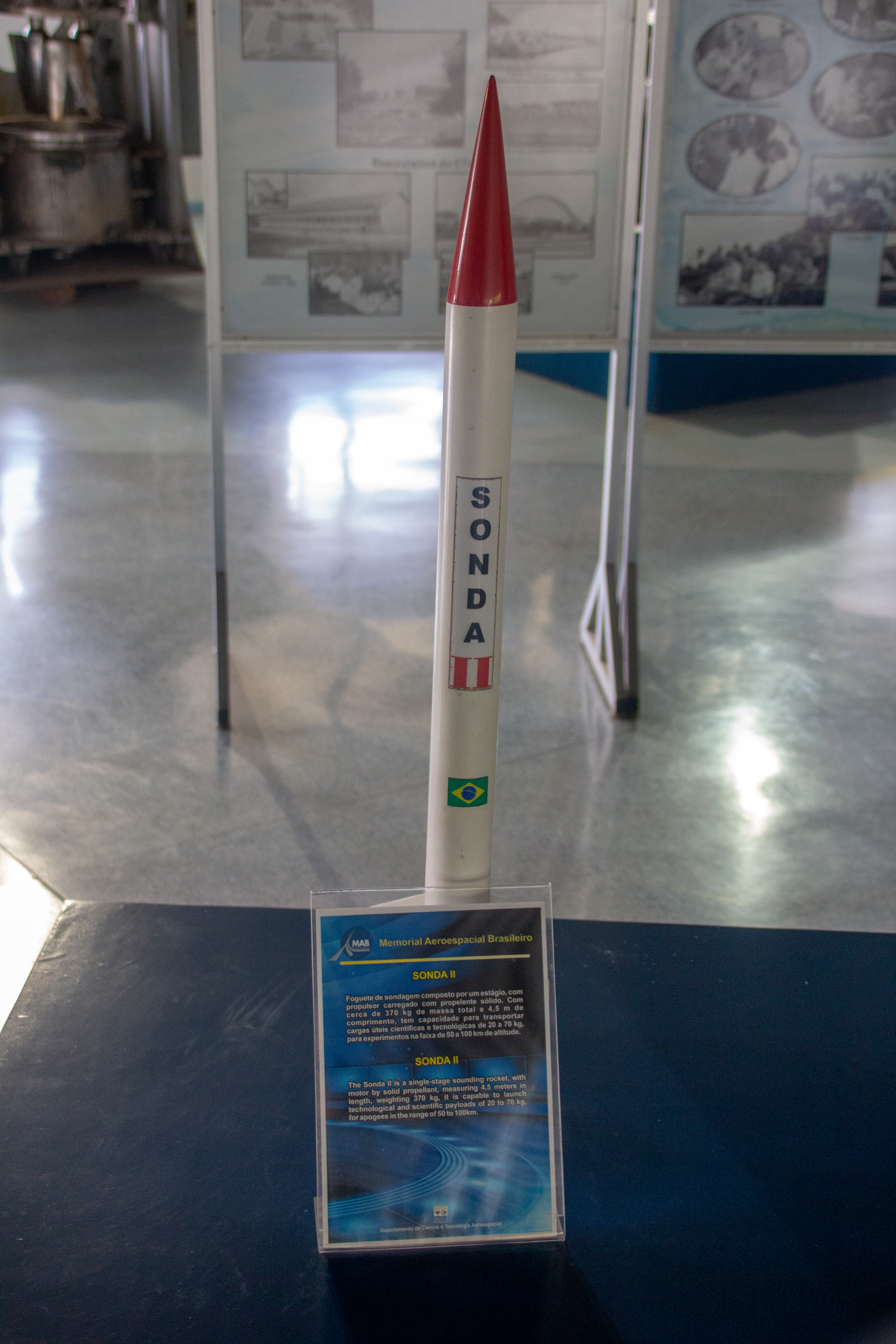
Sonda II at Memorial Aeroespacial Brasileiro

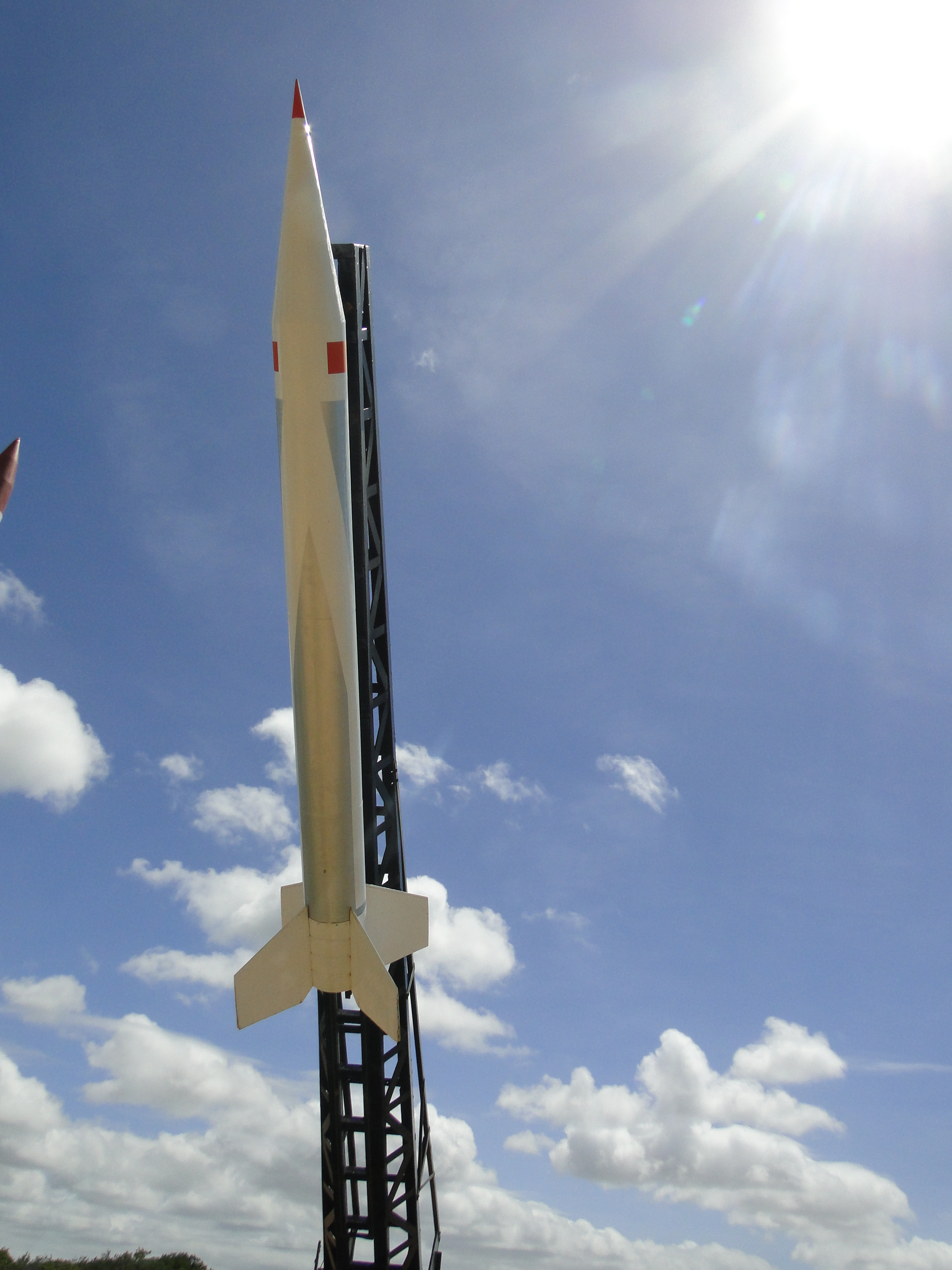
Sonda II on display

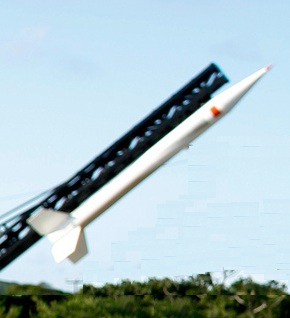
Sonda II on display

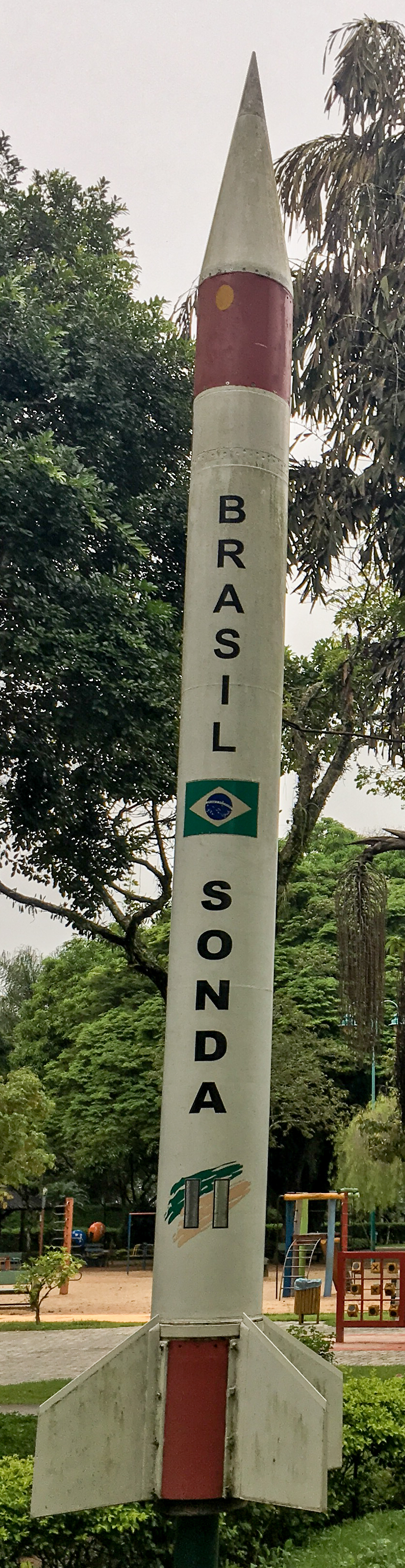
Sonda II at Parque Santos Dumont

== Sonda III ==
Sonda III is a two stage rocket available in three versions, the Sonda III (S-30 & S-20 rocket stages), the Sonda III M1 (S-30 & S-23 rocket stages) and the Sonda IIIA (S-30 & S-33 rocket stages). The first two versions rockets have a maximum flight altitude of 600 km, a liftoff thrust of 102 kN, a diameter of 0.30 m and a length of 8 m. However Sonda III weighs 1500 kg while Sonda III M1 weighs 1400 kg at launch. It was launched 27 times between 1976 and 2002.

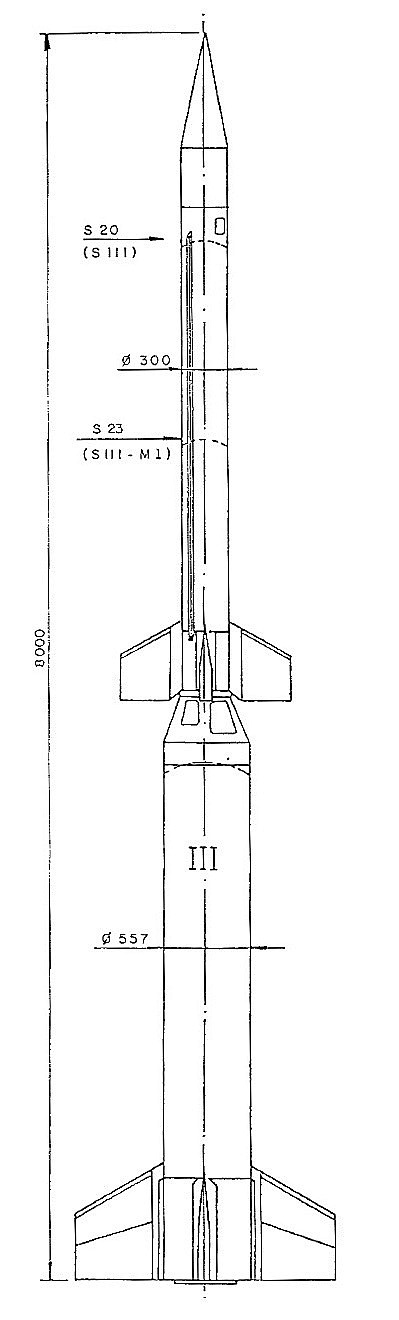
Diagram with Sonda III rocket dimensions

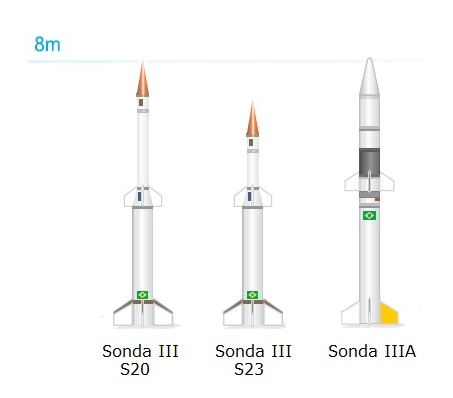
Sonda III rocket variations

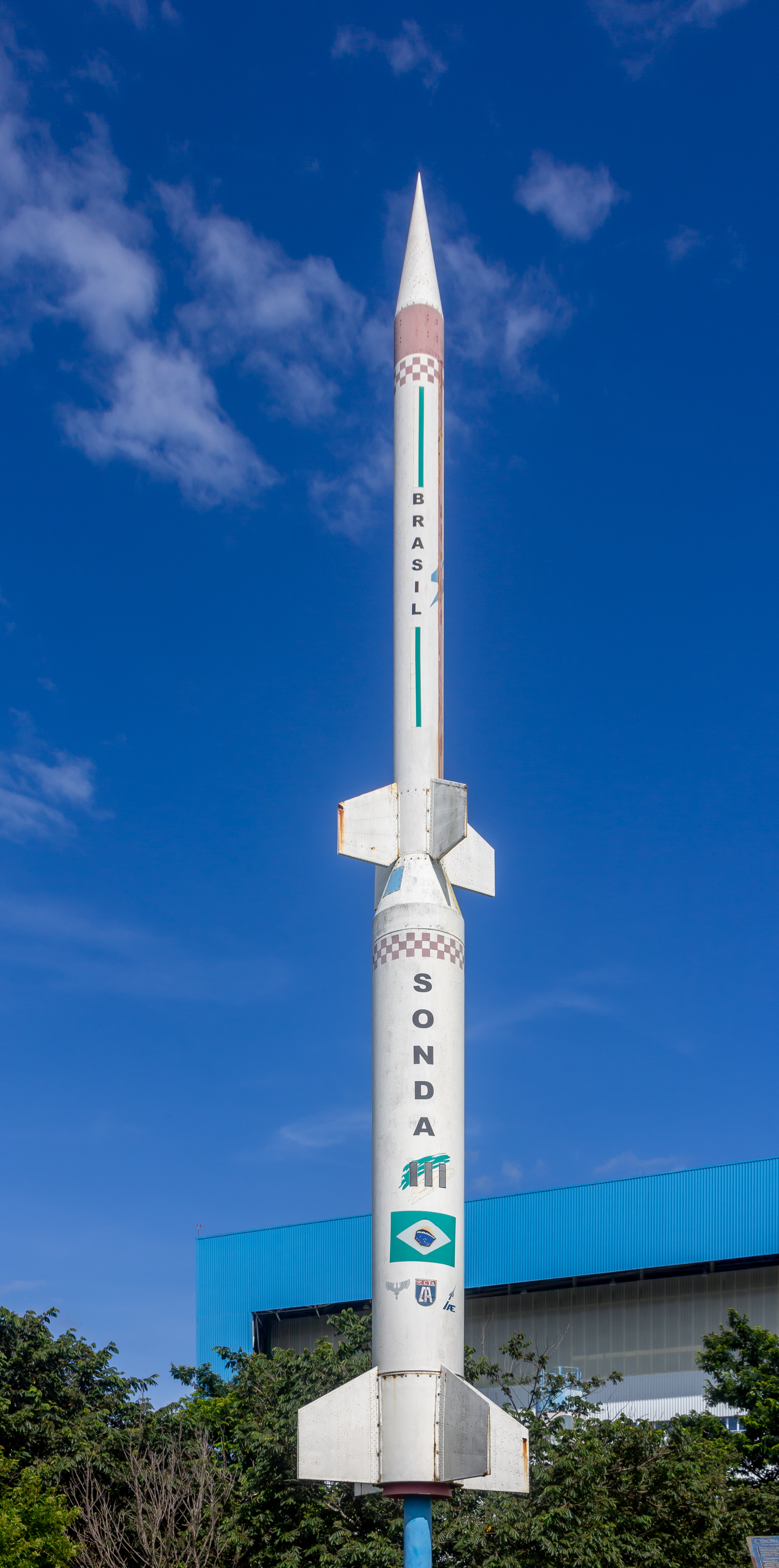
Sonda III at Memorial Aeroespacial Brasileiro

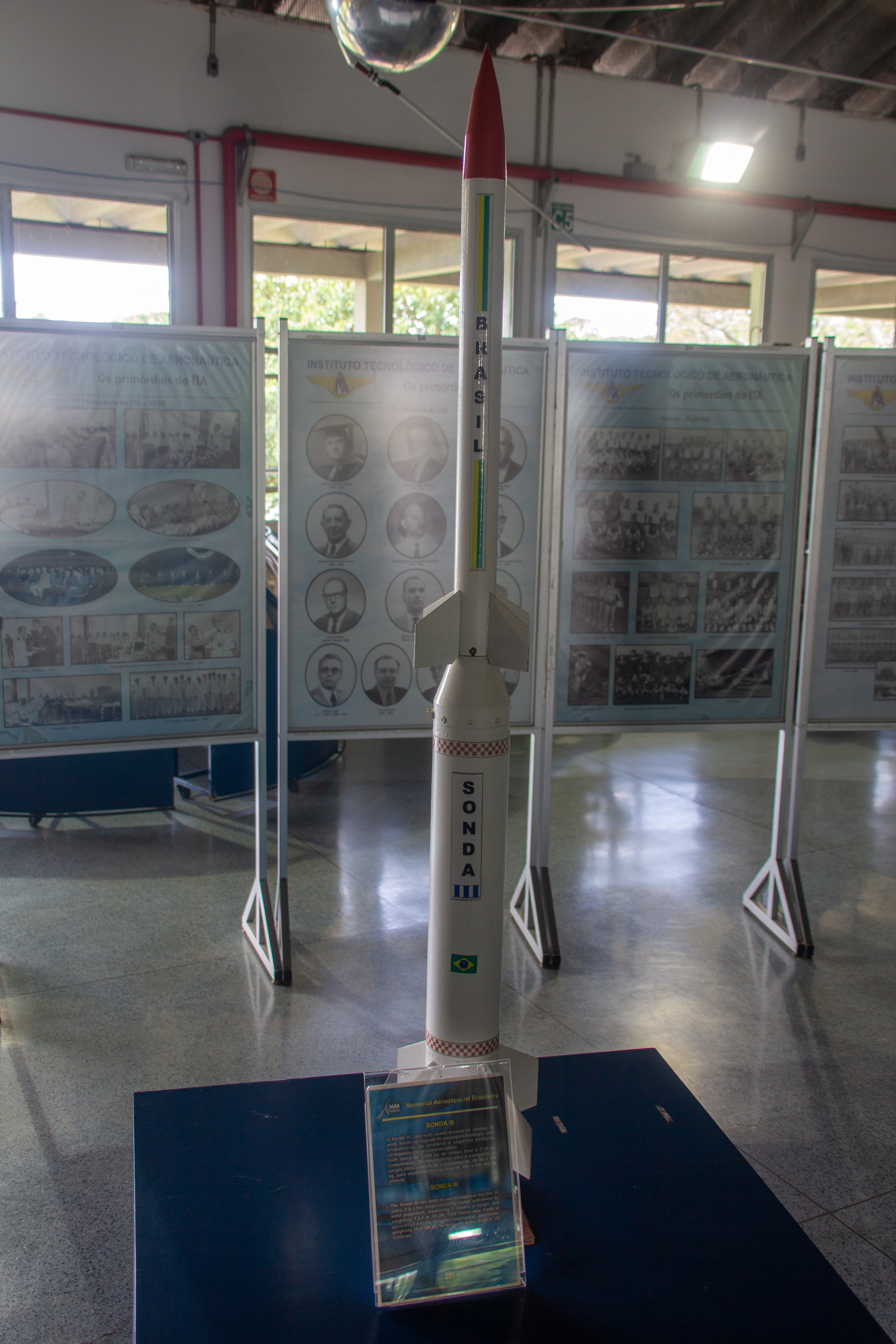
Sonda III at Memorial Aeroespacial Brasileiro

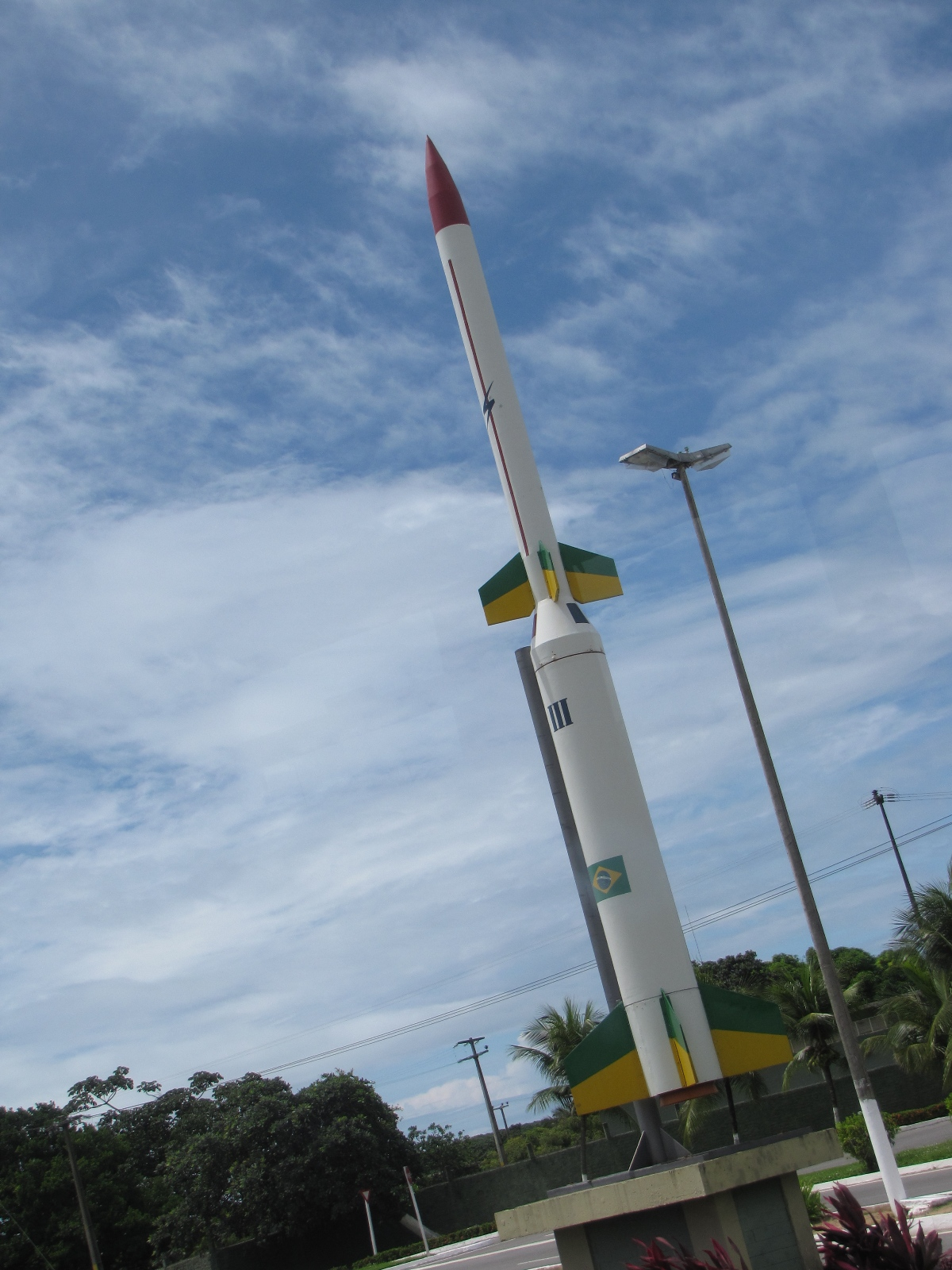
Sonda III at Barreira do Inferno

Sonda III on display

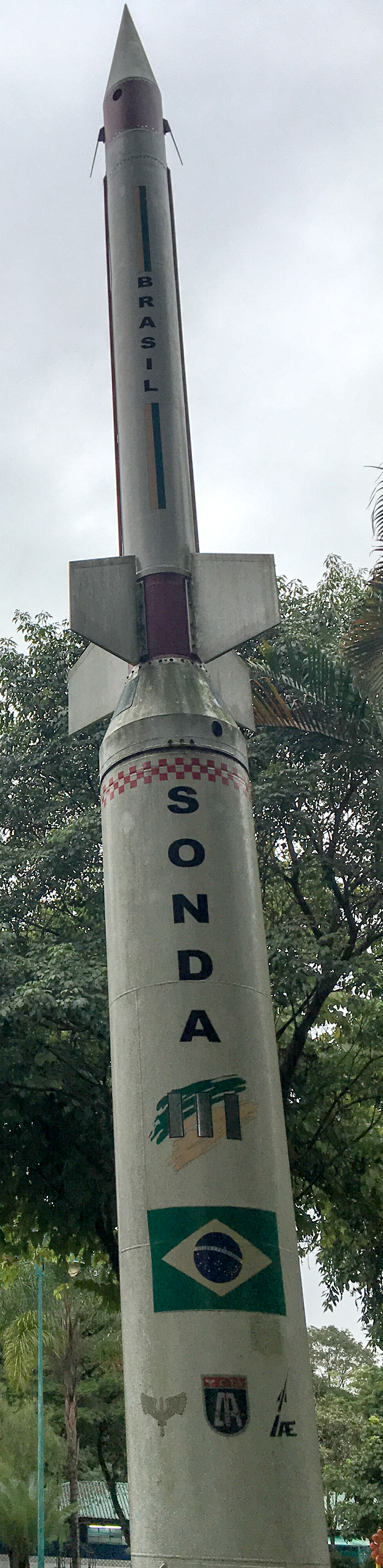
Sonda III at Parque Santos Dumont

== Sonda IV ==
Sonda IV is a two stage rocket (S-40 & S-43 rocket stages) with a maximum flight altitude of 800 km, a liftoff thrust of 203.00 kN, a total mass of 7200 kg, a diameter of 1.01 m and a length of 11 m. It was launched 7 times between 1984 and 1990.

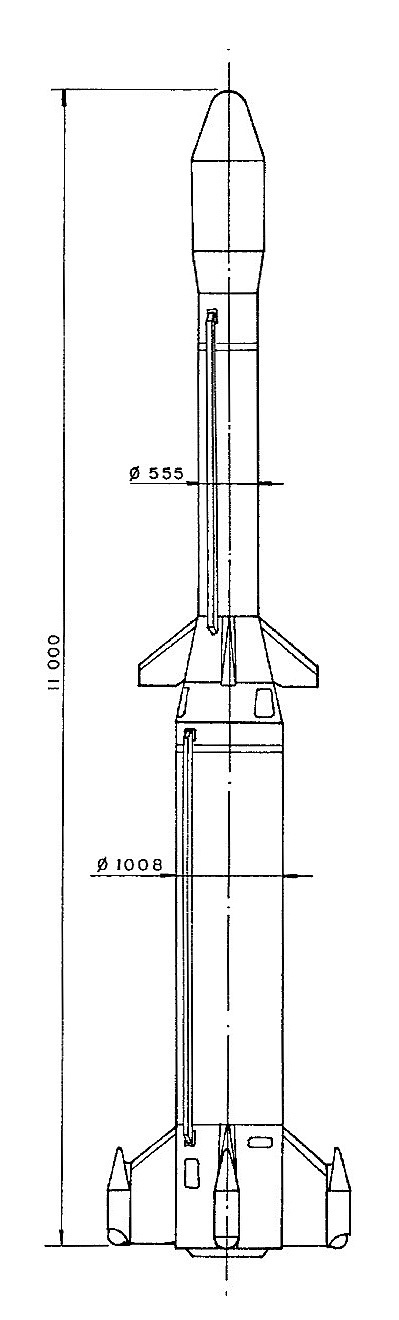
Diagram with Sonda IV rocket dimensions

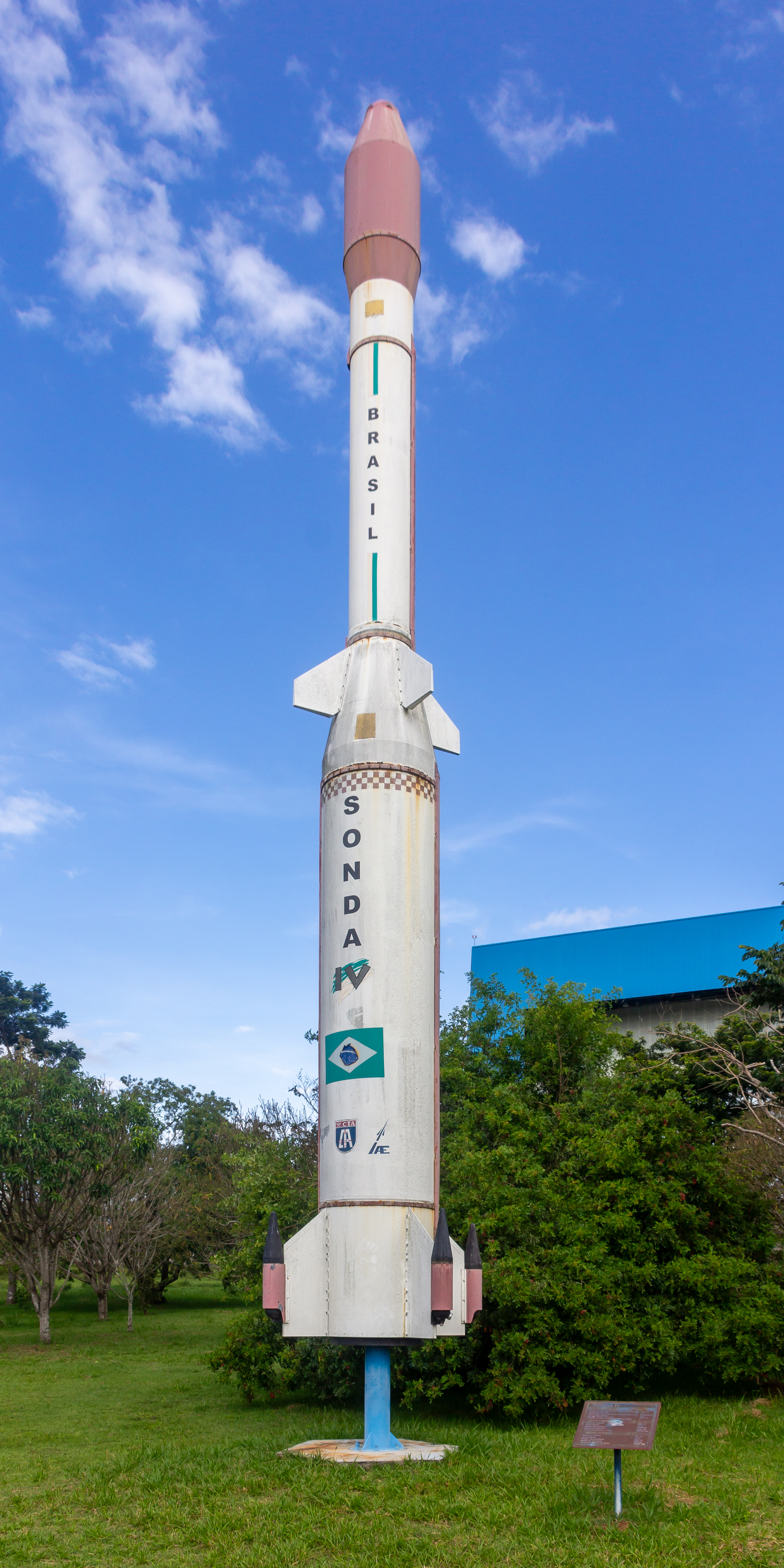
Sonda IV at Memorial Aeroespacial Brasileiro

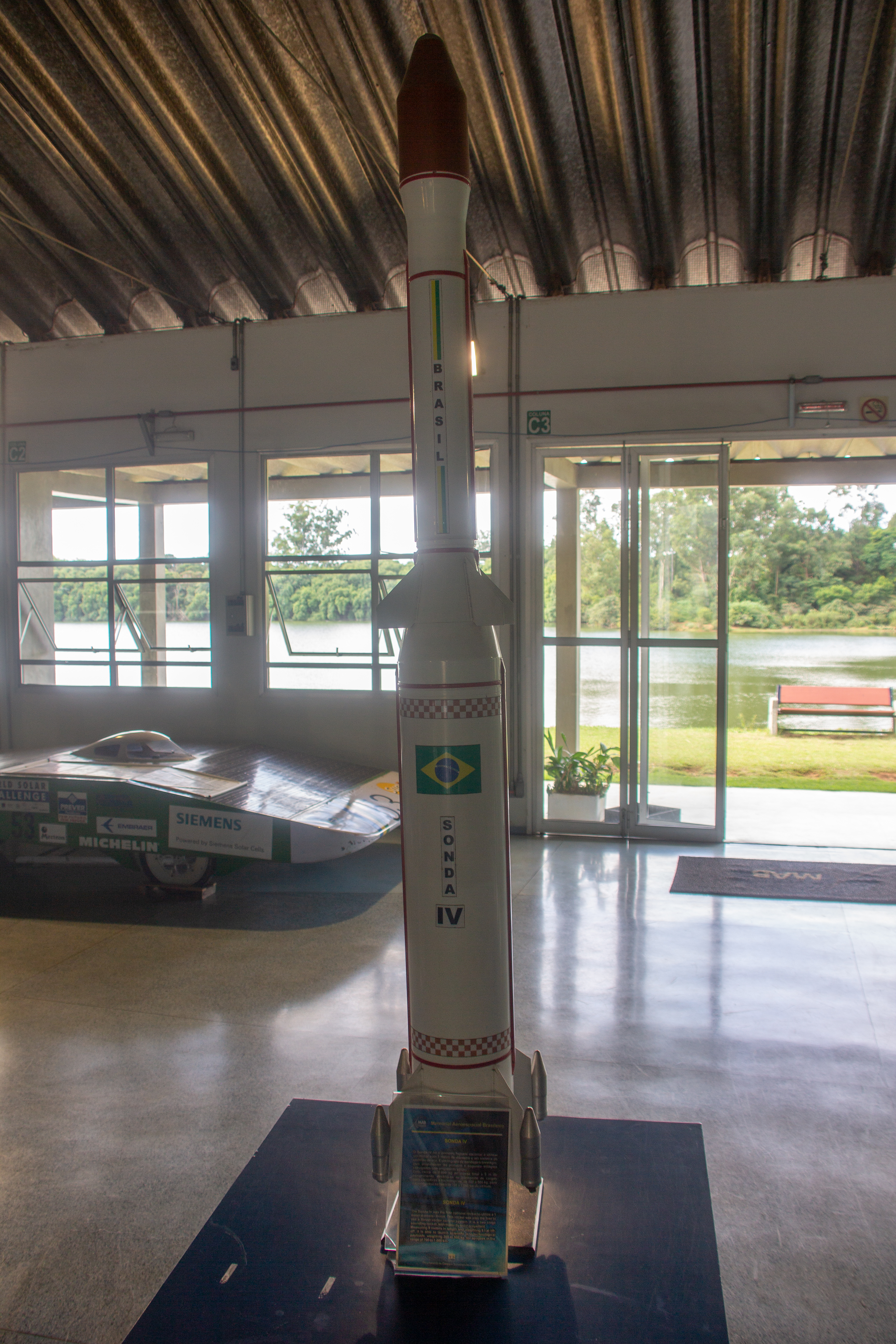
Sonda IV at Memorial Aeroespacial Brasileiro

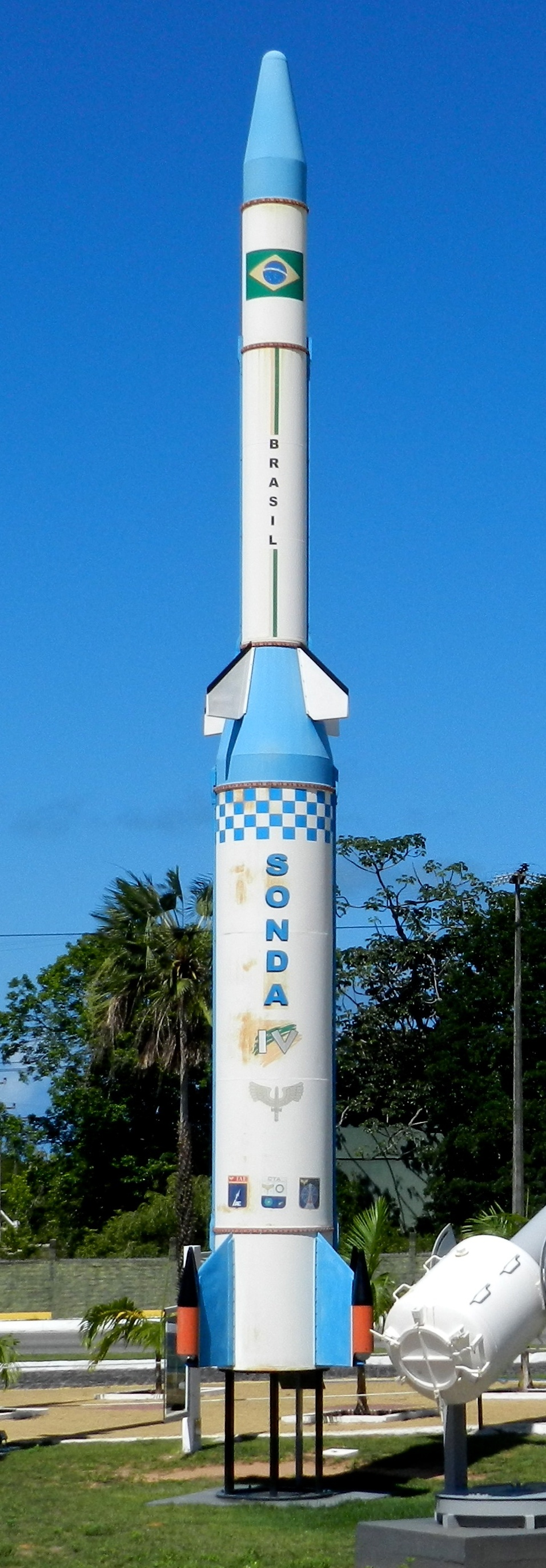
Sonda IV on display

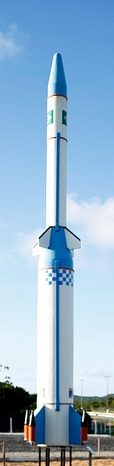
Sonda IV on display

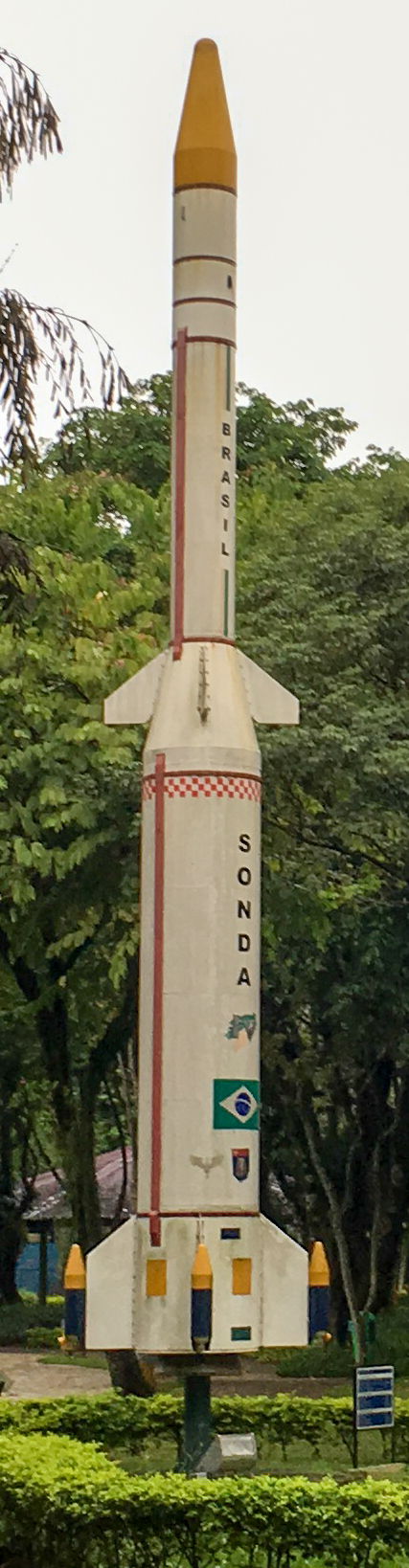
Sonda IV at Parque Santos Dumont

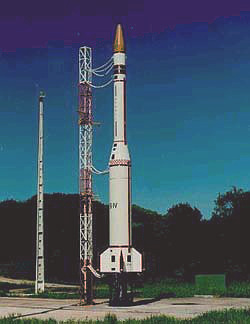
Sonda IV on pad

== Stages and engines ==
The Sonda series uses the following stages and engines:

=== S-10-1 rocket stage ===
The S-10-1 rocket stage has the following specifications:

- Engine: Sonda 1 Booster
- Developer: IAE
- Thrust: 27.00 kN (6,070 lbf)
- Gross mass: 30 kg (66 lb)
- Unfuelled mass: 15 kg (33 lb)
- Height: 1.50 m (4.90 ft)
- Diameter: 0.13 m (0.42 ft)
- Usage: Sonda I first stage

=== S-10-2 rocket stage ===
The S-10-2 rocket stage has the following specifications:

- Engine: Sonda 1
- Developer: IAE
- Gross mass: 30 kg (66 lb)
- Unfuelled mass: 14 kg (30 lb)
- Height: 2.10 m (6.80 ft)
- Diameter: 0.11 m (0.36 ft)
- Thrust: 4.20 kN (944 lbf)
- Burn time: 32 s
- Usage: Sonda I second stage

=== S-20 rocket stage ===
The S-20 rocket stage has the following specifications:

- Engine: S-20
- Developer: Avibras
- Thrust: 36.00 kN (8,093 lbf)
- Gross mass: 300 kg (660 lb)
- Unfuelled mass: 77 kg (169 lb)
- Height: 4.20 m (13.70 ft)
- Diameter: 0.30 m (0.98 ft)
- Thrust: 36.00 kN (8,093 lbf)
- Burn time: 20 s.
- Usage: Sonda II, Sonda III second stage

=== S-23 rocket stage ===
The S-23 rocket stage has the following specifications:

- Engine: S-23
- Developer: Avibras
- Gross mass: 200 kg (440 lb).
- Unfuelled mass: 69 kg (152 lb).
- Height: 2.20 m (7.20 ft).
- Diameter: 0.30 m (0.98 ft).
- Thrust: 18.00 kN (4,046 lbf).
- Burn time: 20 s
- Usage: Sonda III M1 second stage

=== S-30 rocket stage ===
The S-30 rocket stage has the following specifications:

- Usage: Sonda III series first stage, VLS fourth stage, VS-30 Orion and VSB-30 first stage

=== S-33 rocket stage ===
The S-33 rocket stage has the following specifications:

- Usage: Sonda IIIA second stage

=== S-40 rocket stage ===
The S-40 rocket stage has the following specifications:

- Usage: Sonda IV first stage, VS-40 and VS-40M second stage, VLS third stage

=== S-43 rocket stage ===
The S-43 rocket stage has the following specifications:

- Engine: S-43
- Developer: IAE
- Chamber Pressure: 56.20 bar
- Area Ratio: 12.82
- Gross mass: 8,425 kg (18,573 lb)
- Unfuelled mass: 1,245 kg (2,744 lb)
- Height: 9.00 m (29.50 ft)
- Diameter: 1.00 m (3.20 ft)
- Thrust: 303.00 kN (68,117 lbf)
- Specific impulse: 265 s
- Specific impulse sea level: 225 s
- Burn time: 59 s
- Usage: Sonda IV second stage, VLS first second stage engines
