= CELPA (El Chamical) =

CELPA I (El Chamical)
- Centro de Experimentación y Lanzamiento de Proyectiles Autopropulsados
- La Rioja Province, Argentina
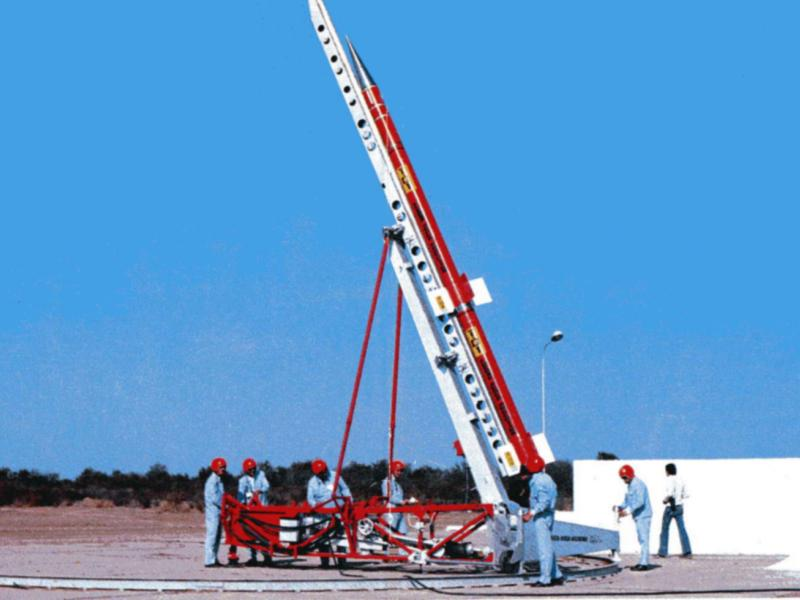
- Tauro T-01 rocket at CELPA Chamical

Site information
- Type: rocket launch site
- Operator: Argentine Air Force, Argentine Army
- Website: https://www.argentina.gob.ar/fuerzaaerea/direccion-general-de-investigacion-y-desarrollo/centro-de-experimentacion-y-de-lanzamiento-de

Location
- Location in Argentina
- Coordinates: 38°30′S 66°19′W

Site history
- Built: 1963
- In use: 1963 to 1973

CELPA I (El Chamical) (Centro de Experimentación y Lanzamiento de Proyectiles Autopropulsados) was a rocket launch site in Argentina, near El Chamical at 38°30′S 66°19′W, in the La Rioja Province.

The launch site was in service between 1963 and 1973 and was mainly used for launching rockets of the types Centauro, Judi Dart, Orión, Rigel, Centaure and Boosted Dart.

A second CELPA compound was built in 1964 in Mar Chiquita, north of Mar del Plata, under the name of CELPA Atlántico.

== See also ==
- CELPA (Mar Chiquita)
