= CELPA (Mar Chiquita) =

CELPA II (Mar Chiquita)
- Centro de Experimentación y Lanzamiento de Proyectiles Autopropulsados
- Mar Chiquita, Argentina (north of Mar del Plata)

Site information
- Type: rocket launch site
- Operator: Argentine Air Force, Argentine Army

Location
- Location in Argentina
- Coordinates: 37°43′36″S 57°24′54″W

Site history
- Built: 1968
- In use: 1968 to 1976; 2025

CELPA II (Mar Chiquita) also known as CELPA II Atlántico (Centro de Experimentación y Lanzamiento de Proyectiles Autopropulsados) is a rocket launch site in Mar Chiquita, Argentina, north of Mar del Plata.

The launch site was in service from 1968 to 1976 and was mainly used for launching rockets of the types Orión-2, Arcas, Rocketsonde and Dragon I. The tests from CELPA Atlántico were sponsored by the United Nations since 1969. There was a total number of 69 tests. The compound was used by agencies like NASA, Meteorological Rocket Network (USA), CNES (France) and CONAE (Argentina).

As of 2016, the site is used by the Argentine Air Force and Army to test anti-aircraft weaponry.

In 2025 the MET 1-SO "Escorpio" sounding rocket was launched from the site, followed by MET 2-SO "CRUX".

== See also ==
- CELPA (El Chamical)
