= Boosted Dart =

American sounding rocket

Boosted Dart is a United States single stage sounding rocket of the Loki family. Between 1966 and 1968, 39 of these rockets were launched by NASA. The Boosted Dart has a length of 3.30 meters, a diameter of 0.1 meters and a maximum flight altitude of 75 kilometers.
