= Orión (rocket) =

Orión was the designation of a sounding rocket family of Argentina, which was launched between 1965 and 1971 at CELPA (El Chamical), CELPA (Mar Chiquita), Tartagal and Wallops Island.

Developed by the Instituto de Investigaciones Aeronauticas y Espaciales (IIAE), An Orión flight on August 13, 1966 that reached an apogee of 114 km, surpassing the Kármán line, made Argentina the first South American nation to launch a rocket into space.

== Orión-1 ==
Orión-1
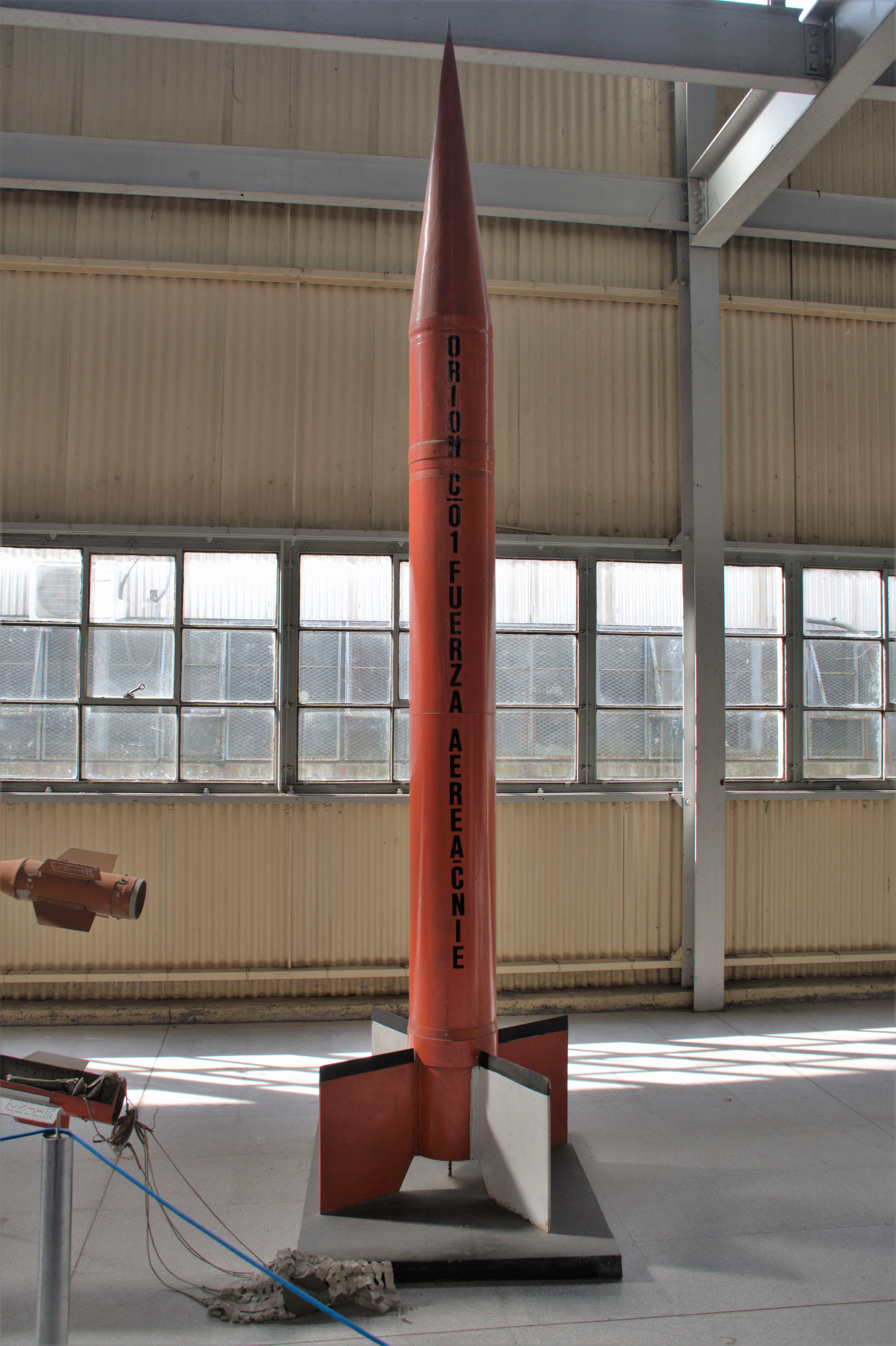
- Orión-1 at the National Aeronautics Museum of Argentina
- Function: Sounding rocket
- Manufacturer: Instituto de Investigaciones Aeronáuticas y Espaciales (IIAE)
- Country of origin: Argentina

Size
- Height: 3 m (9.8 ft)
- Diameter: 0.21 m (8.3 in)
- Mass: 100 kg (220 lb)
- Stages: 1

Capacity

Launch history
- Launch sites: CELPA Chamical
- Total launches: 2
- Success(es): 2
- First flight: October 1, 1965
- Last flight: July 1, 1966

First stage - Orión
- Burn time: 12 seconds
- Propellant: solid
- Fuel & Oxidizer mass/volume: 55 kg (121 lb)

The first version Orión-1 was flown twice in 1965 and 1966 from CELPA (El Chamical), in order to test the engines and technologies.

It had a length of 3.00 m (9.84 ft), a diameter of 21 cm (8.3 in) and a weight of 100-kilogram (220 lb). Apogee was 80 km (50 mi) for a 10-kilogram (22 lb) payload. Solid fuel mass was 55-kilogram (121 lb) with a burn time of 12 seconds.

=== Launches ===
Table of Orión-1 launches:

Date	Launch site	Launch Vehicle	Mission Type	Apogee
1965 October 1	CELPA	Orión-1	Test mission	90 km (55 mi)
1966 July 1	CELPA	Orión-1	Test mission	90 km (55 mi)

=== Gallery ===
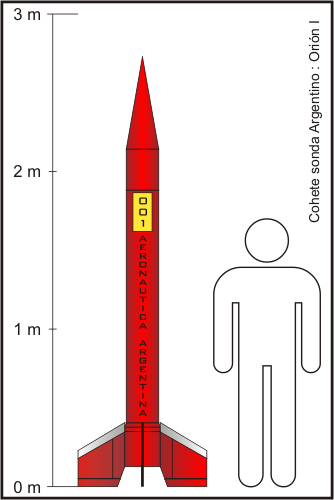
Orión-1 diagram

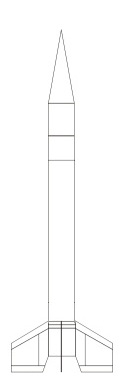
Orión-1 diagram

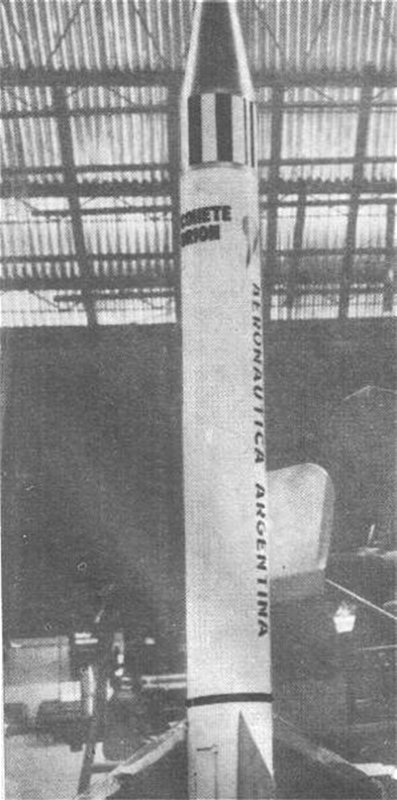
Orión-1 photo

== Orión-2 ==
Orión-2
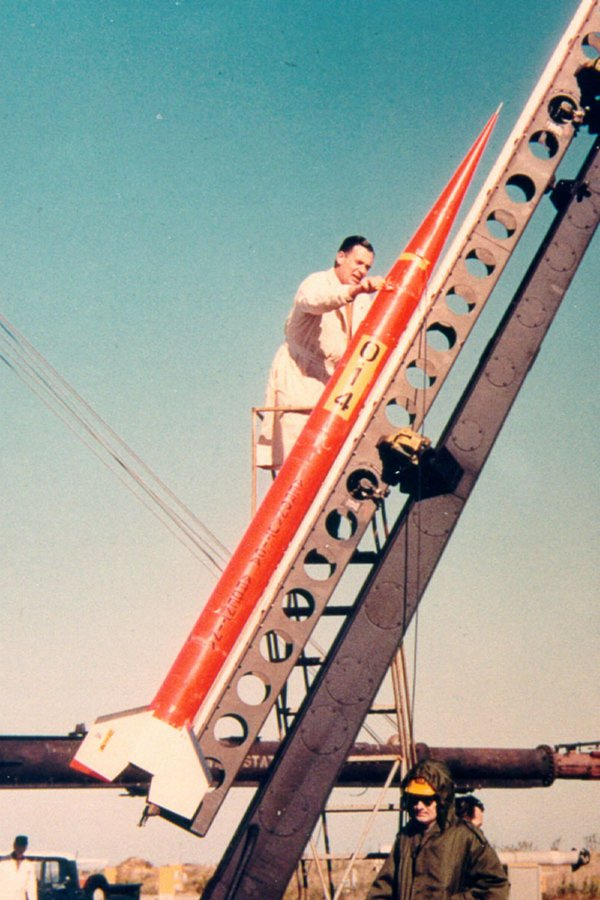
- Launch preparations for Orión-2 O-14 (1967)
- Function: Sounding rocket
- Manufacturer: Instituto de Investigaciones Aeronáuticas y Espaciales (IIAE)
- Country of origin: Argentina

Size
- Height: 3.77 m (12.4 ft)
- Diameter: 0.21 m (8.3 in)
- Mass: 100 kg (220 lb)
- Stages: 1

Capacity

Launch history
- Launch sites: Wallops Island, CELPA (El Chamical), CELPA (Mar Chiquita), Tartagal
- Total launches: 22
- First flight: May 19, 1966
- Last flight: December 19, 1971

First stage - Orión
- Burn time: 12 seconds
- Propellant: solid
- Fuel & Oxidizer mass/volume: 55 kg (121 lb)

In November 1966, three tests of the updated Orión-2 took place from Wallops Island.

This version had a gross takeoff mass of 100 kg (220 lb) and could carry a 25-kilogram (55 lb) payload to an apogee of 160 km (99 mi). Its dimensions were 3.77 m (12.4 ft) in length and 21 cm (8.3 in) in diameter.

Orión-2 was launched 22 times from 1966 to 1971. Besides Wallops, launch sites included CELPA (El Chamical), CELPA (Mar Chiquita) and Tartagal.

=== Launches ===
Table of Orión-2 launches:

Date	Launch site	Launch Vehicle	Mission Type	Apogee
1966 May 19	CELPA	Orión-2	Test mission	100 km (60 mi)
1966 August 13	CELPA	Orión-2	Test mission	114 km (70 mi)
1966 September 1	CELPA	Orión-2	Test mission	90 km (55 mi)
1966 November 4	Wallops Island	Orión-2	Test mission	90 km (55 mi)
1966 November 7	Wallops Island	Orión-2	Failure	0 km (0 mi)
1966 November 9	Wallops Island	Orión-2	Test mission	82 km (50 mi)
1966 November 12	Tartagal	Orión-2	Eclipse mission	90 km (55 mi)
1966 November 12	Tartagal	Orión-2	Eclipse mission	90 km (55 mi)
1966 November 12	Tartagal	Orión-2	Eclipse mission	90 km (55 mi)
1967 May 19	CELPA	Orión-2	Rat payload	90 km (55 mi)
1967 September 6	CELPA	Orión-2	Aeronomy mission	90 km (55 mi)
1967 September 7	CELPA	Orión-2	Aeronomy mission	90 km (55 mi)
1967 September 7	CELPA	Orión-2	Aeronomy mission	90 km (55 mi)
1967 December 14	CELPA	Orión-2	X-ray astronomy mission	35 km (21 mi)
1967 December 16	CELPA	Orión-2	X-ray astronomy mission	70 km (43 mi)
1968 January 24	Mar Chiquita	Orión-2	Chemical release mission	90 km (55 mi)
1968 November 27	Mar Chiquita	Orión-2	Chaff	56 km (34 mi)
1969 May 28	CELPA	Orión-2	Biological mission	90 km (55 mi)
1969 August 30	CELPA	Orión-2	X-ray astronomy mission	90 km (55 mi)
1969 August 30	CELPA	Orión-2	Biological mission	90 km (55 mi)
1970 May 3	Mar Chiquita	Orión-2	Chemical release/fields mission	90 km (55 mi)
1971 December 19	CELPA	Orión-2	Test mission	106 km (65 mi)

=== Gallery ===
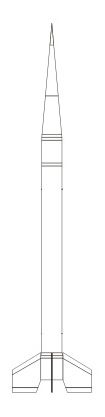
Orión-2 diagram

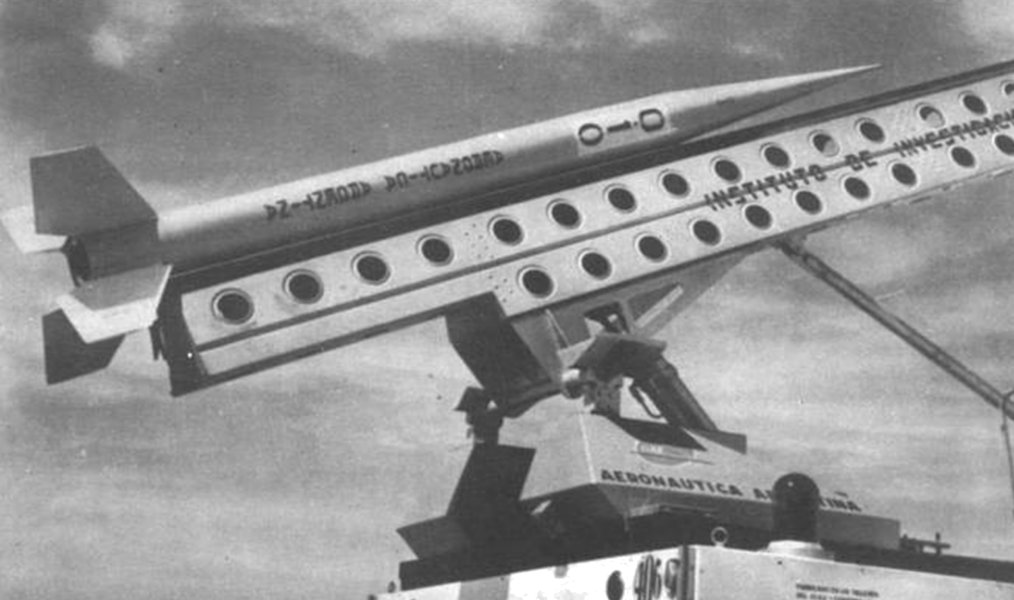
Orión-2 O-10 on the launch ramp

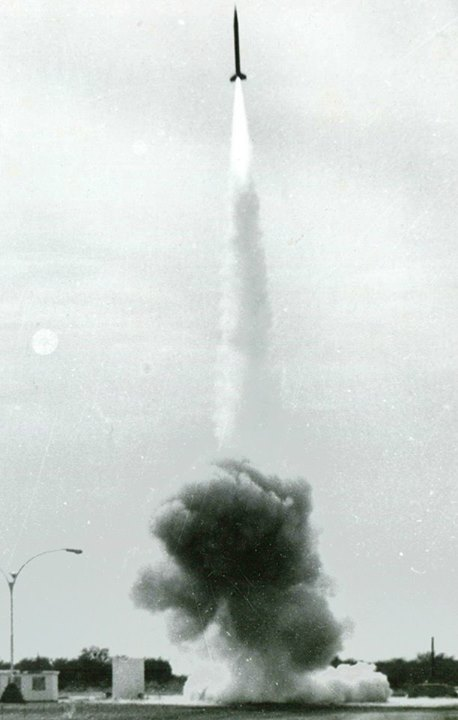
Orión-2 launch from Chamical (August 13, 1966)

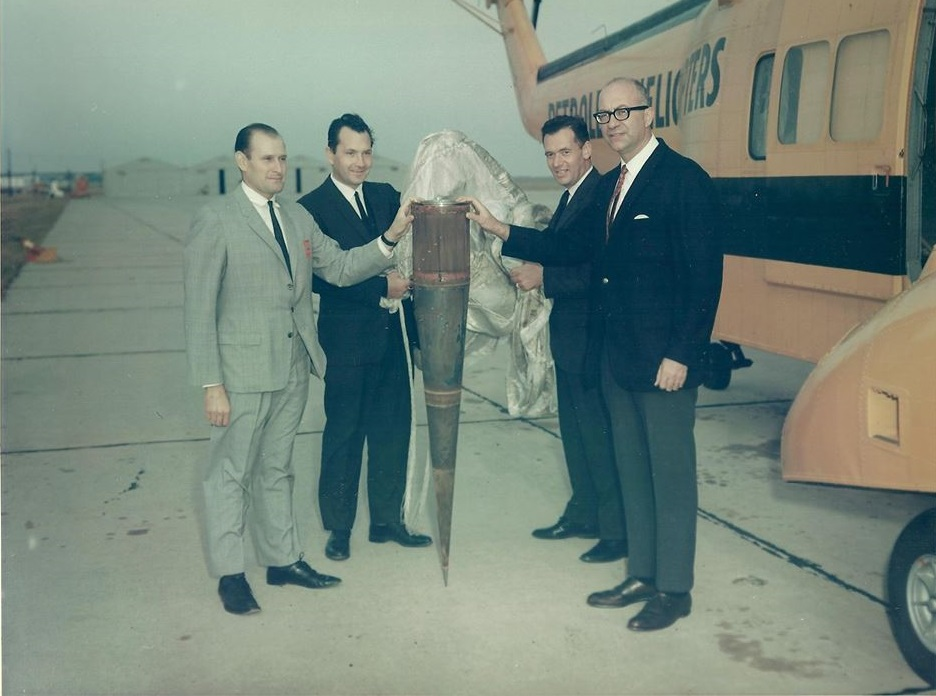
Payload recovered from Orión-2 at Wallops Island (November 1966)

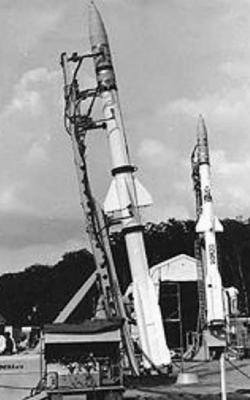
Orión-2 rockets prepared for solar eclipse observations (November 10, 1966)
