= National Space Activities Commission =

Argentine space agency

- Comisión Nacional de Actividades Espaciales

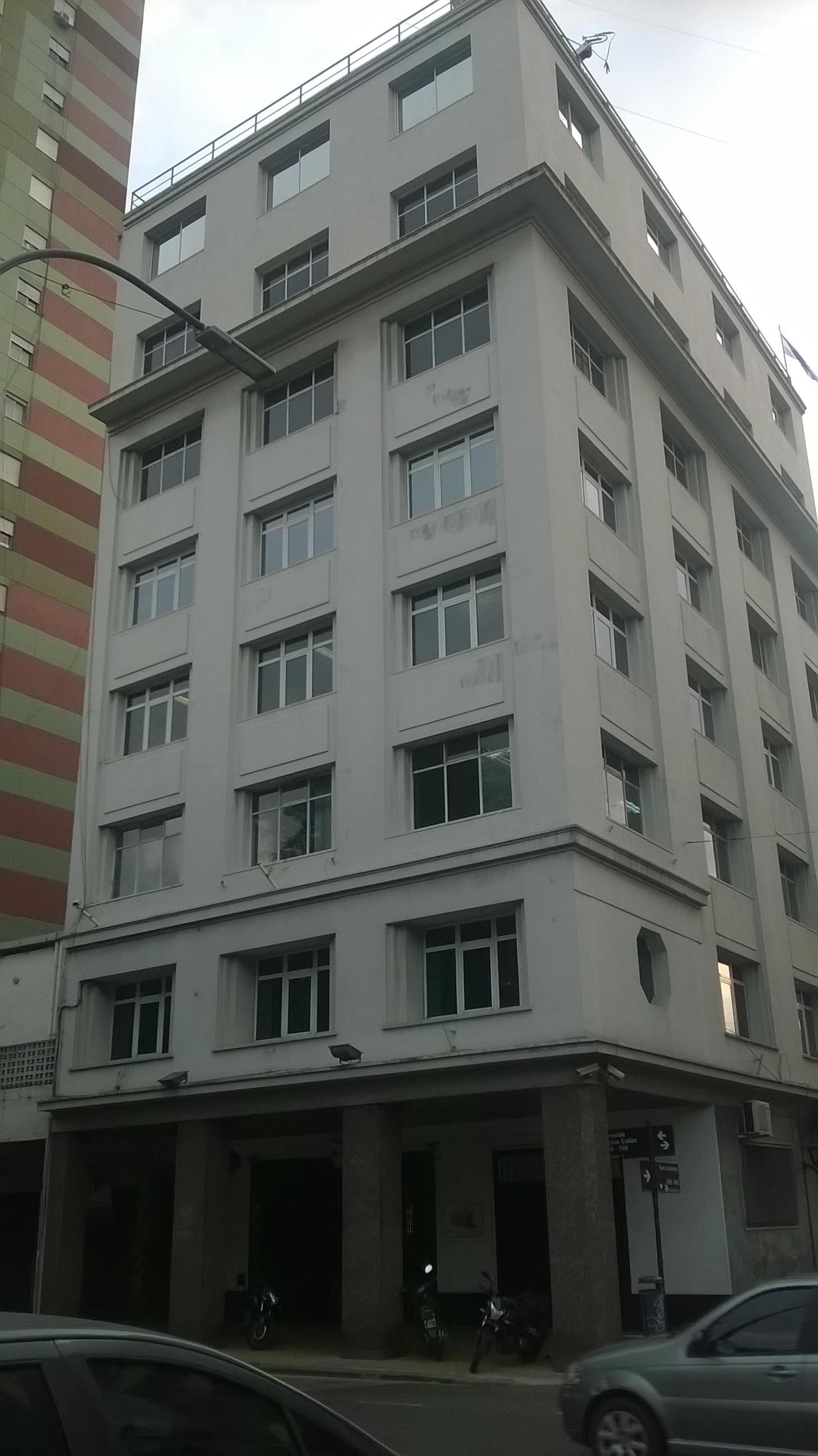
- CONAE headquarters in Buenos Aires

Agency overview
- Formed: 28 January 1960; 66 years ago (As CNIE); 28 May 1991; 35 years ago (As CONAE)
- Preceding agency: CNIE (1960-1991)
- Jurisdiction: Argentine government
- Headquarters: Av. Paseo Colón 751, Buenos Aires
- Employees: 1,000+
- Annual budget: ▲7.458 billion ARS (US$77.5 million) (2021)
- Agency executive: Josefina Pérès, Executive and Technical Director
- Website: argentina.gob.ar/ciencia/conae

The National Space Activities Commission (Spanish: Comisión Nacional de Actividades Espaciales, CONAE) is the civilian agency of the government of Argentina in charge of the national space programme.

== History ==
=== Sociedad Argentina Interplanetaria ===
During the 1940s, Teófilo Tabanera organized a group of foreign and Argentine specialists as the Sociedad Argentina Interplanetaria, SAI (Argentine Interplanetary Society). Tabanera's efforts ensured that Argentina was the first Latin American nation to create a spaceflight organisation and in 1952 was one of the founding members of the International Astronautical Federation. Argentine Aldo Cocca was a pioneer in space law and helped originate the idea of space being the common heritage of humankind, later enshrined in United Nations treaties of the 1960s.

=== Comisión Nacional de Investigaciones Espaciales ===
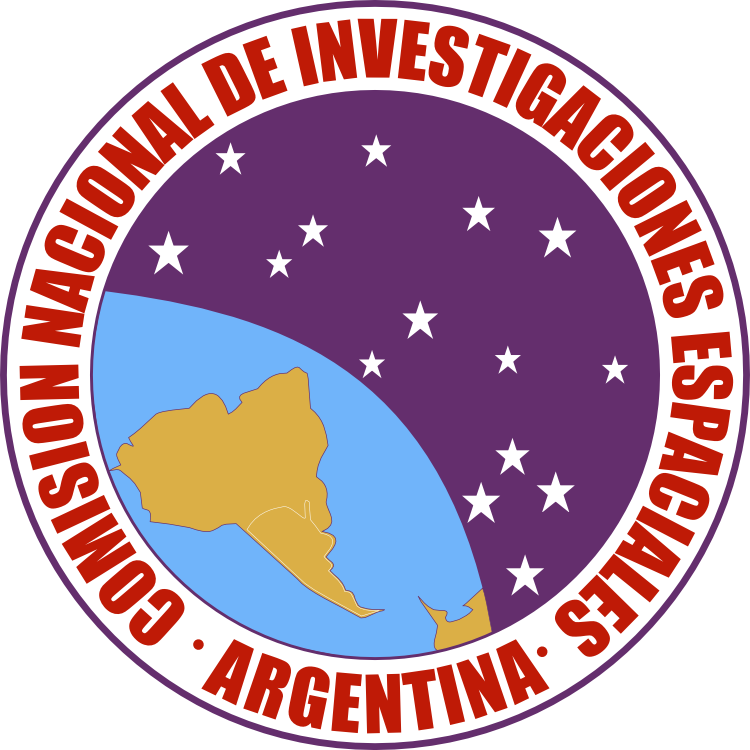
Logo Comisión Nacional de Investigaciones Espaciales CNIE

In 1960, Tabanera was named head of the newly created Comisión Nacional de Investigaciones Espaciales "CNIE" (National Commission for Space Research), a forerunner agency founded in 1960.

CNIE worked with the Argentine Air Force's Instituto de Investigaciones Aeronáuticas y Espaciales (IIAE) to develop a number of indigenous multistage high-altitude sounding rockets and missiles (Alfa Centauro and Beta Centauro in 1961, Gamma Centauro in 1962, Proson-M1 in 1963, Orión-1 in 1965, Orión-2 and Canopus I in 1966, Rigel, Canopus II and Castor in 1969 and Tauro in 1977). Argentina was the first country in Latin America to send an object into space using an indigenously developed rocket.

In October 1968, a committee of French studies (from the CNES) visited the airport to conduct a survey and trace maps and planes, planning to carrying out a bi-national project called EOLO that involved launching from three bases in Argentina (Mendoza, Neuquén, and Tierra del Fuego), small super pressure balloons which would be interrogated by a satellite during its flight. Once checked the appropriate soil conditions, in April of the following year, the Command-in-Chief of the Argentine Air Force formally requested to the Mendoza provincial State a grant the loan of a portion of land located in the north side of the airport, to establish the station. As requested, the province gave the land required as free loan extended for five years. After that time, the remaining facilities would be taken by the local government. The program, from the CNIE's side, was initially managed from the Argentine Air Force Condor Headquarters in Buenos Aires by EE Ingeniero Enrique Setaro. Upon the starting of the operational phase of the program the CNIE replaced him with an Air Force officer.

During the 1970s, Argentina regularly launched the American two-stage solid-propellant Castor rocket up to 500 kilometers altitude. This rocket carried international experiments for several countries.

In the 1970s the CNIE signed an agreement with the French Centre National d'Études Spatiales (CNES) (English: National Centre for Space Studies) to create and implement the EOLO Program. It would involve the launch of 500 stratospheric air balloons into the Earth's stratosphere to study the dynamics of air displacement. The stratosphere is the second major layer of Earth's atmosphere, just above the troposphere, and below the mesosphere. The stratosphere is stratified (layered) in temperature, with warmer layers higher and cooler layers closer to the Earth; this increase of temperature with altitude is a result of the absorption of the Sun's ultraviolet radiation (shortened UV) by the ozone layer.

=== Condor Program ===
In the 1980s, Argentina took part in a multinational effort to develop the Condor missile. Under United States pressure, the Condor program was cancelled in 1991. The associated development and production facilities at Falda del Carmen were closed down, the Fabrica Militar de Aviones, which concentrated on development of surveillance satellites for Earth resource and environmental monitoring.

=== Comisión Nacional de Actividades Espaciales ===
The present commission (CONAE) was created on 28 May 1991, during the government of Carlos Menem, after the cancellation of the military Condor missile program in an attempt to move all the commission efforts to civilian purposes. It received the Air Force aerospace facilities in Córdoba and Buenos Aires of the former CNIE, as well as some of the civil personnel involved in the cancelled project.

Since the 1990s the new commission signed agreements with NASA and European agencies and has developed a number of Earth Observation satellites, including SAC-A, the failed mission SAC-B, and the SAC-C launched in 2000 and still operating.

The administration of Cristina Fernández de Kirchner renationalizes Fabrica Militar de Aviones in 2009 and the Falda del Carmen facility has been reactivated to support the development of the new Tronador II rocket. Defense missile and rocket development has been restarted under the umbrella of CITEFA.

== Teófilo Tabanera Space Center ==
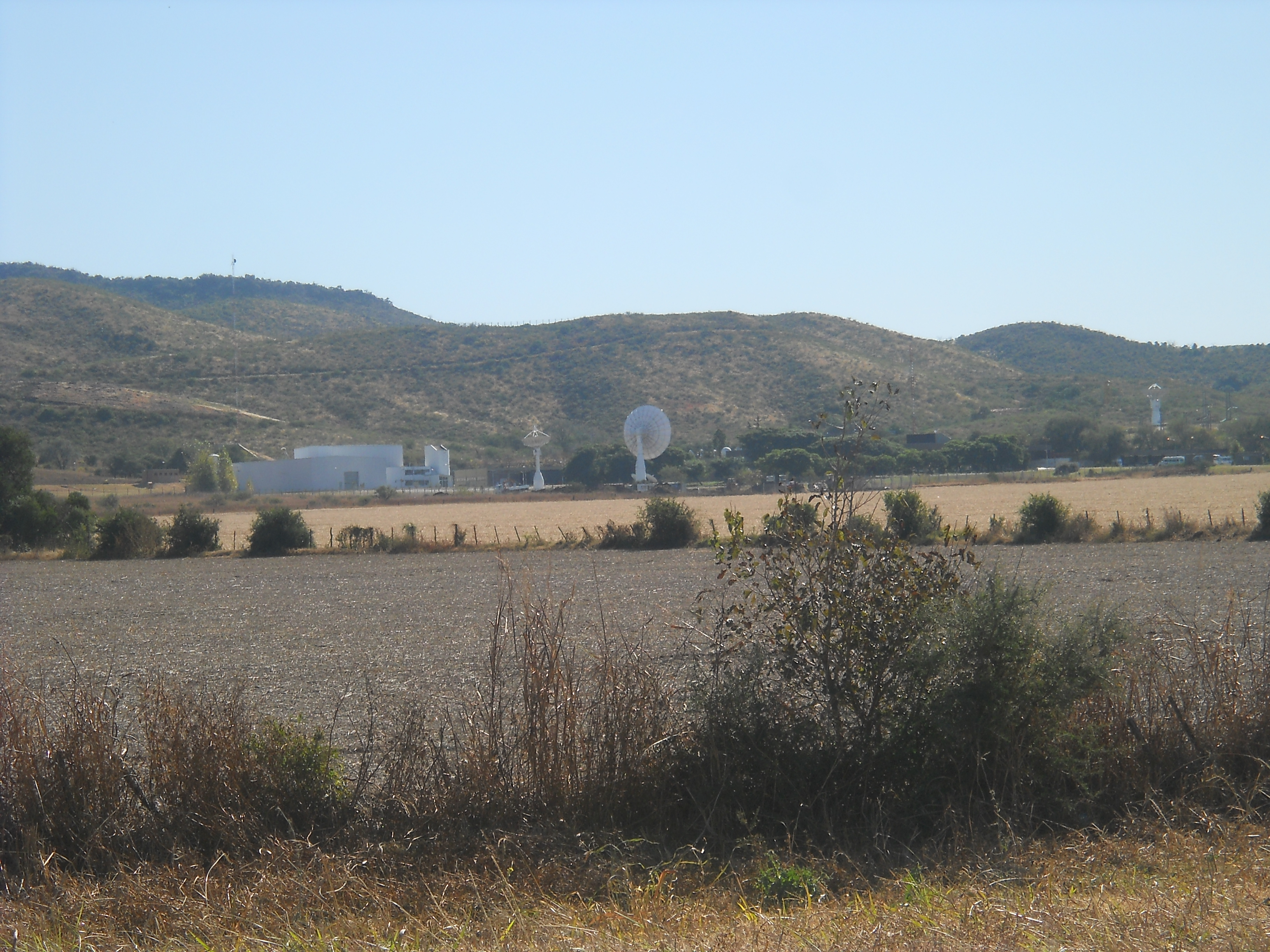
Teófilo Tabanera Space Center (CETT)

Córdoba Ground Station (ETC) antennas tracking a satellite

The Teófilo Tabanera Space Center, or CETT (Centro Espacial Teófilo Tabanera), is located 30 km southwest from Córdoba, in a region called Falda del Carmen and houses the following installations:

=== Cordoba Ground Station ===
Responsible for the tracking, command and control (TT&C) of the Argentine satellites, and for the ingestion, cataloging and archiving of satellite data products. CONAE's Córdoba Ground Station (ETC) has been in operation since 1997. It has capacity for data reception and TT&C. Currently, it receives data from 12 international satellites, besides the data from Argentine missions. The National Space Program foresees the setting up of a second ground station in Ushuaia, Tierra del Fuego Province, at the southern tip of Argentina, to enable the collection of data on the Antarctic continent.

=== Mission Operation Center ===
Responsible for planning, commands elaboration and monitoring the Argentine satellites. Today the SAC-C Mission Operation Center is fully operative and SAC-D mission operation centre is being implemented in order to control the SAC-D/Aquarius satellites launched on 10 June 2011.

=== Testing and Integration Facilities ===
Testing and Integration Facilities are specialized spaces where different components of space missions, such as satellites, spacecraft, and instruments, are tested, assembled, and integrated. These facilities play an important role in ensuring that the equipment and technology intended for space missions function properly and reliably.

=== Institute for Advance Space Studies "Mario Gulich" ===
For the promotion of advanced knowledge and innovative use of space information, it also aims at developing highly skilled human resources. It has been named in honor of former CONAE physicist Mario Gulich, who conceived the first Argentine satellite for scientific applications: the SAC-B. Mr. Gulich died in 1994.

== Tronador II test site ==
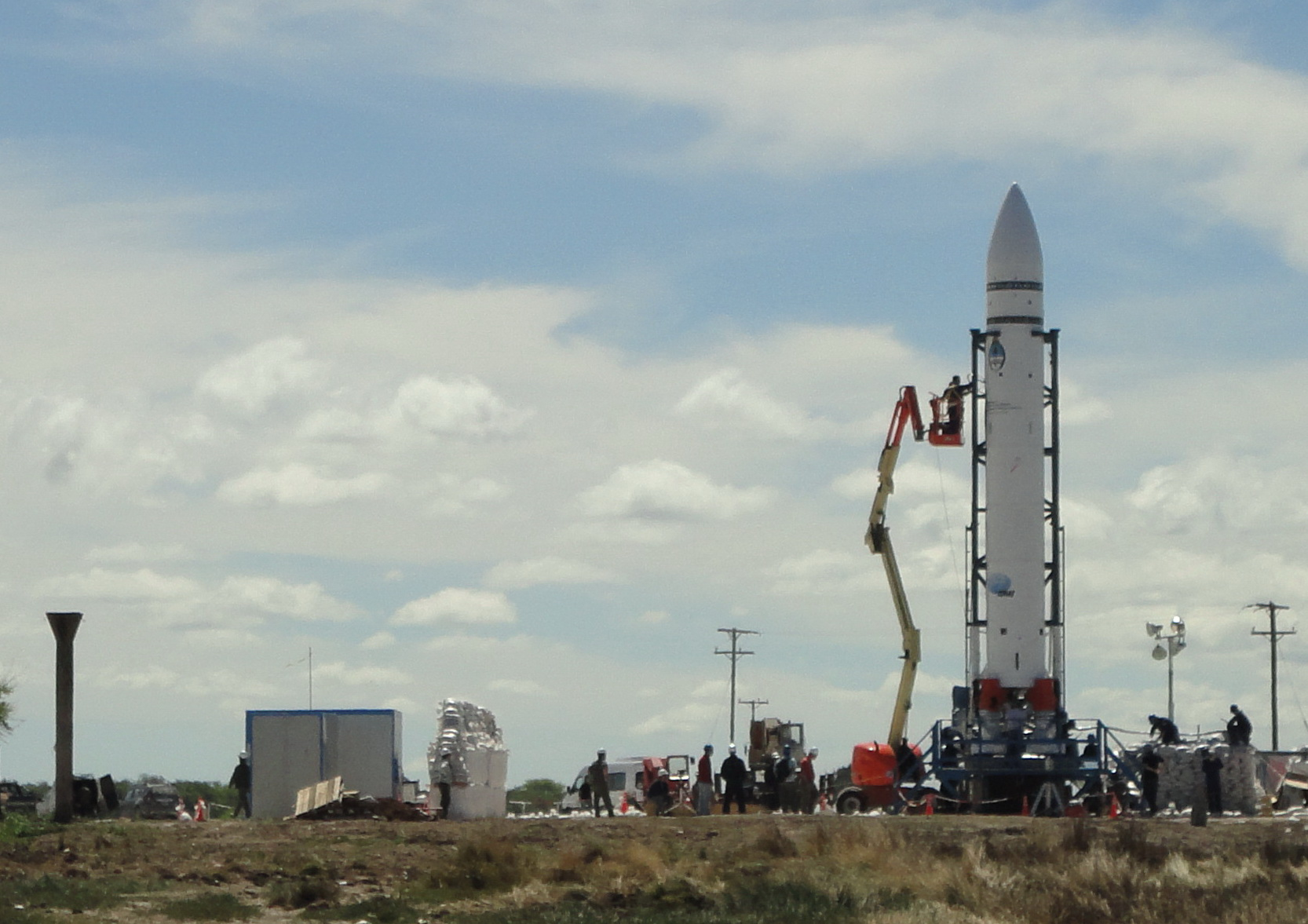
VEx-1A at its launch pad, Punta Indio Spaceport

CONAE built a rocket test site at Las Pipinas, Punta Indio Partido (35.523496°S 57.1846139°W) in the Buenos Aires Province, named "Polo Espacial de Punta Indio". It is intended to test the Vex rockets, technological demonstrators for the Tronador II launcher.

== Tronador II launch site ==
The Tronador launch site will be called "Complejo Argentino de Acceso Al Espacio" (Argentine Space Access complex), located at Puerto Belgrano Naval Base.

== Satellite systems ==
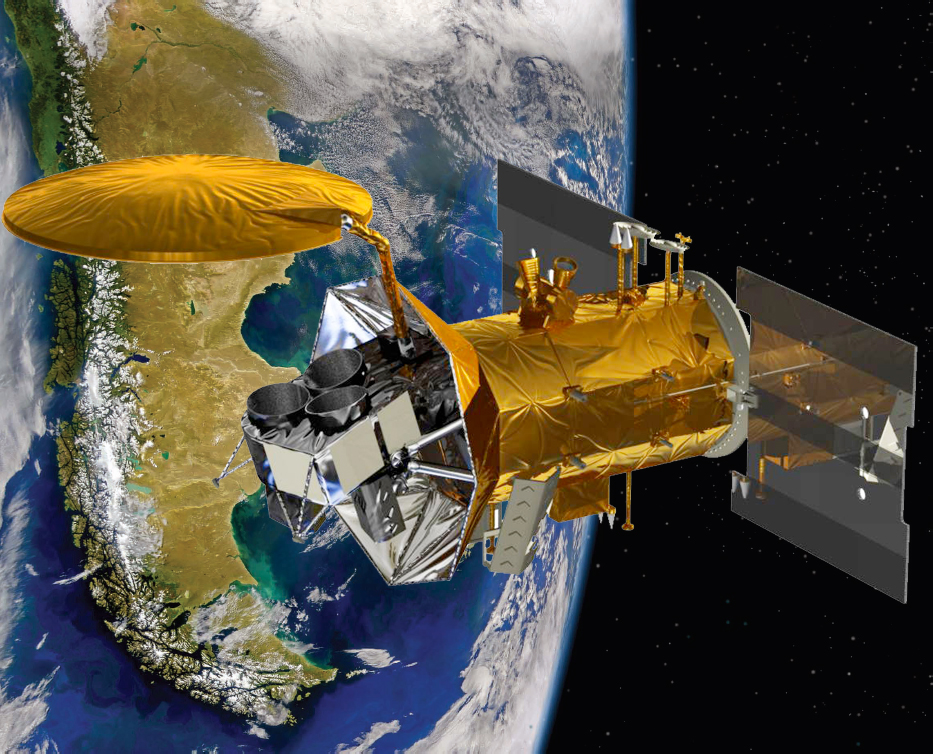
SAC-D

The national space program provides for two satellite series and both are devoted to Earth observation: one with main Argentine instruments in the optical range (SAC) and the other one in the microwave range (SAOCOM).

=== SAC series ===
The SAC series has been developed by the CONAE together with the Argentine company INVAP and a number of local universities, in close cooperation with the NASA. It has also included the participation of Brazil, Denmark, Italy and Germany.

In 2019, five Argentine satellites have been launched: SAC-A, a technological demonstration satellite, SAC-B, which was devoted to scientific research, SAC-C, the first Earth Observation Satellite of Argentina, SAC-D and SAOCOM 1A.

In this context, CONAE has joined efforts with NASA in the creation of the First International Earth Observation Constellation, with Argentine SAC-C and the U.S. Landsat 7, EO-1 and Terra missions.

The satellite launched by CONAE was SAC-D/Aquarius, which was launched on 10 June 10, 2011. It will carry the NASA-provided Aquarius mission for taking measurements of sea salinity which will contribute to the better understanding of the environment, together with CONAE-provided sensors which will contribute to monitoring possible fire focuses.

==== Past missions ====
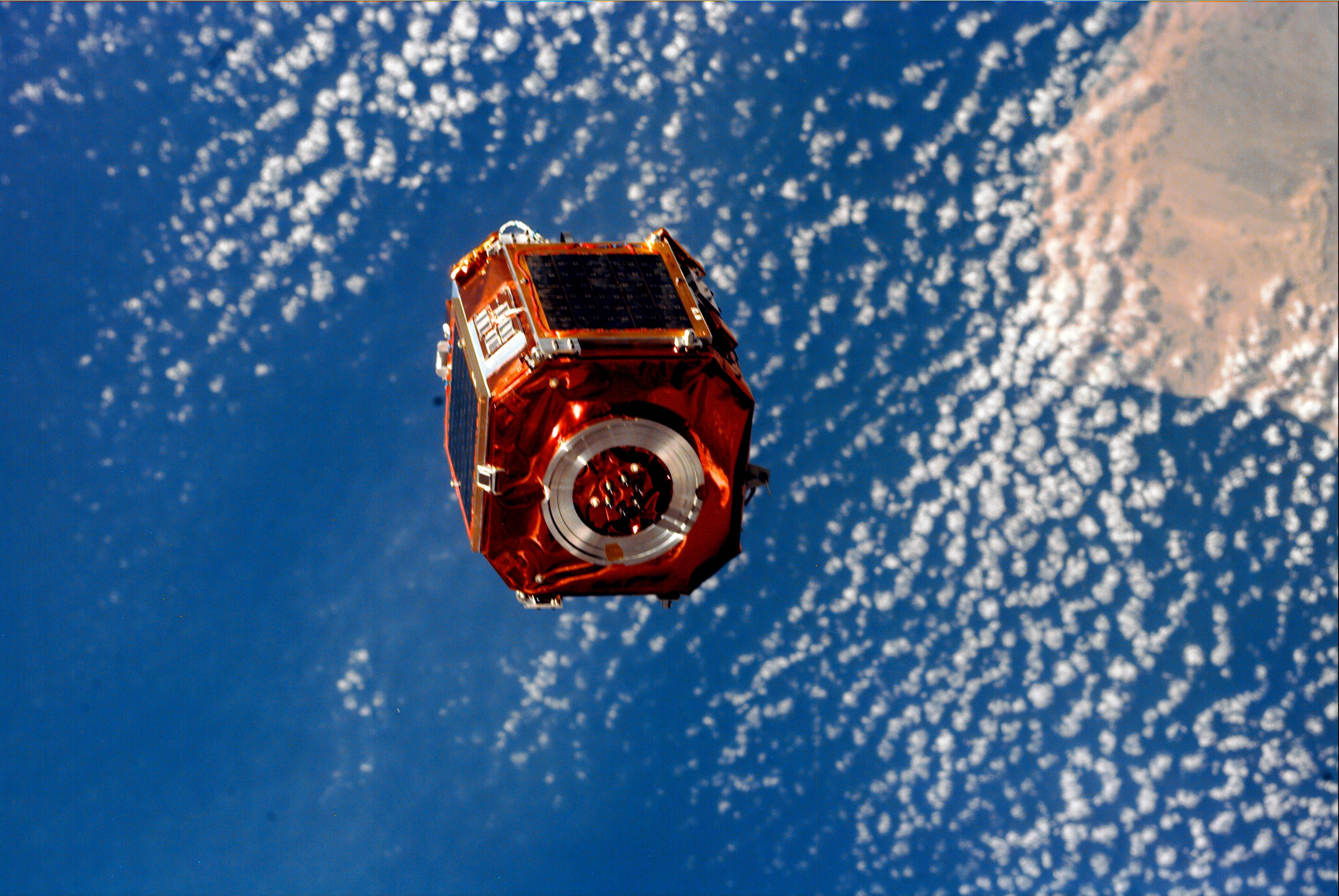
SAC-A view from the Space Shuttle

- SAC-A: 3 December 1998 (Space Shuttle). Conceived to test systems and as a technological model. The satellite burned up upon entering the atmosphere on October 25, 1999.
- SAC-B: 4 November 1996 (Pegasus rocket). The first Argentine scientific satellite, whose main goal was the study of solar physics and astrophysics. Launching problems prevented it from being deployed in orbit. As it was still attached to the rocket, it could not recharge its batteries through its solar panels and was only operated while the batteries lasted. The satellite re-entered the Earth's atmosphere on April 7, 2002.
- SAC-C: 21 November 2000 (Delta rocket). Launched as part of the AM Constellation together with NASA's Landsat 7, TERRA and EO-1. Carried among other instruments a Multispectral Medium Resolution Scanner (MMRS), a High-Resolution Technological Camera (HRTC), a High Sensitivity Camera (HSC) and the GPS Occultation and Passive reflection Experiment (GOLPE). All instruments were provided by CONAE except GOLPE, which was provided by NASA. On 15 August 2013 communication with the satellite was suddenly lost. It had completed its primary mission and far exceeded its original five-year planned life.
- SAC-D/Aquarius: SAC-D was launched on 19 June 2011. Part of a cooperation program between CONAE and NASA (Goddard Space Flight Center and JPL). It carries seven instruments to study the environment, and a technology demonstration.
- SAOCOM 1A: 8 October 2018 by a Falcon 9 of SpaceX. It is an Earth observation satellite.

==== Future missions ====
- SABIA-Mar 1 (SAC-E): launch in 2024. Satellite for the observation and information recollection on water and food on the Mercosur area, developed together with the Brazilian Space Agency.
- SAC-F: Unknown launch date.

=== SAOCOM series ===
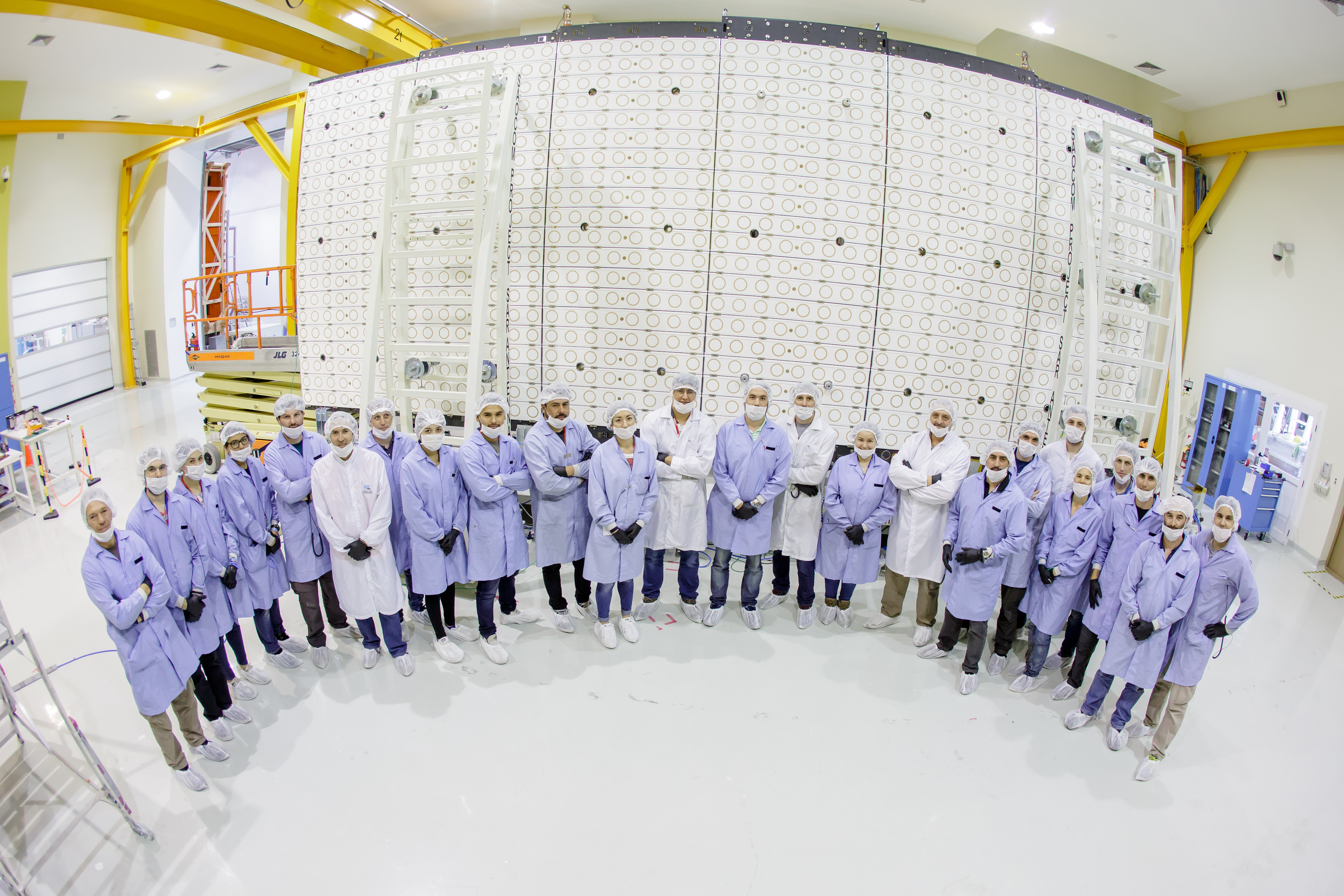
A SAOCOM SAR antenna.

On the other hand, the SAOCOM series involves the construction of two missions with an L-band full polarimetric Synthetic Aperture Radar (SAR) as main payload, with Belgium and Italian partnership.

==== Future missions ====
- SAOCOM: Under development. Satellite that will carry a Synthetic Aperture Radar (SAR), and will be part of a constellation of other satellites in partnership with the Italian Space Agency (ASI).

=== SARE ===
The SARE satellites are under study. They will weigh around 200 kg and employ nanotechnology.

== Launch vehicles ==
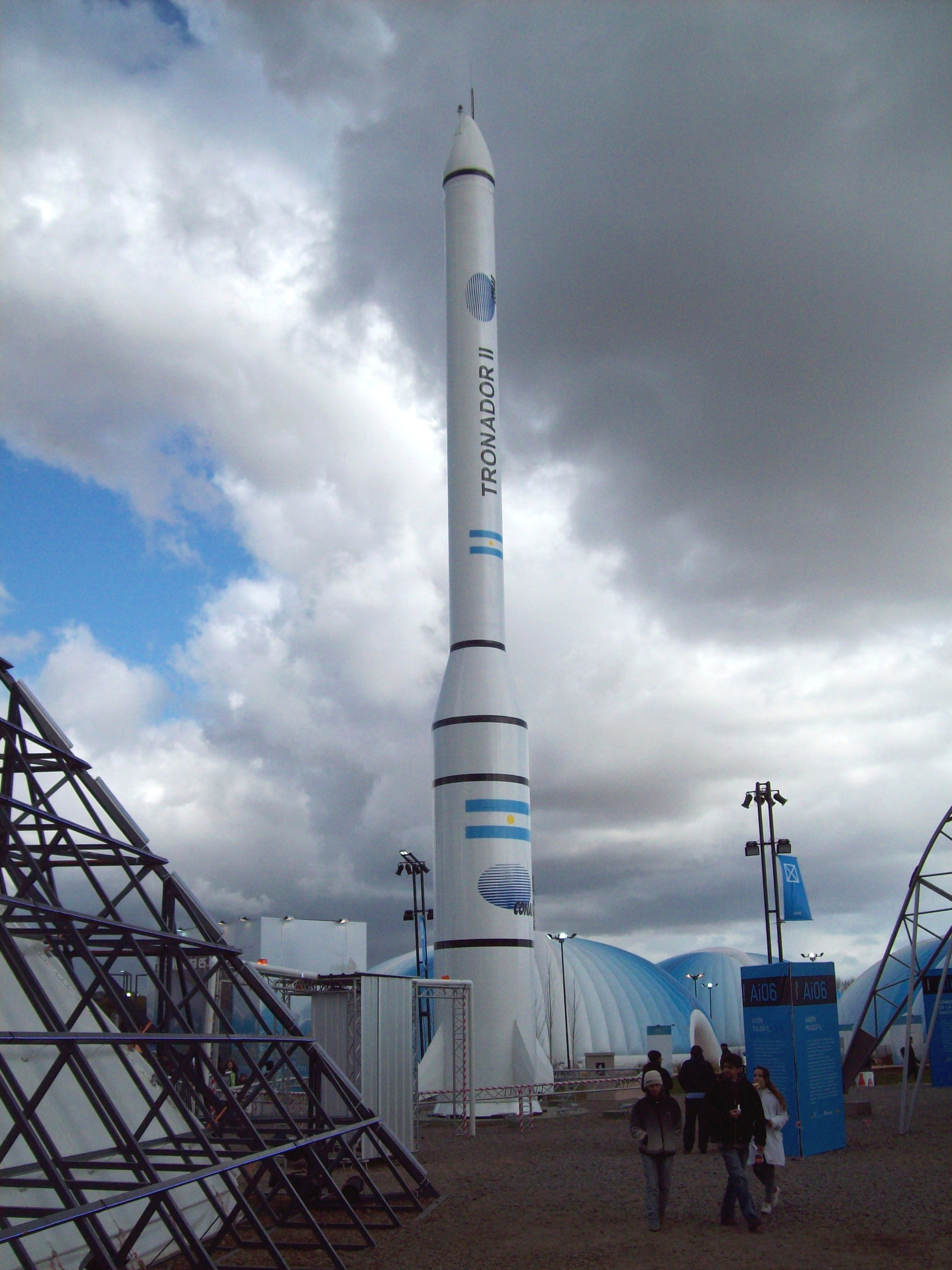
Tronador II rocket

The Tronador, under development, is a multi-stage satellite launcher. It was expected to start flight tests in 2012. The T-4000 third stage test-rocket (with a diameter of 43.8 cm) is also being developed, with the current version using a liquid propellant engine of 40 kN trust. However, in the last 4 years, 1 third stage prototype and 1 first stage pre-prototype launch attempts have been unsuccessful. The last of these attempts ended with the rocket falling in the side of the launcher structure without any fire or explosion due to the rocket being loaded with only 460 kg of fuel for a short combustion in order to test the engine in flight for a few seconds, no material, human or environmental harm resulting.

== Airborne systems ==
CONAE is actually operating a self developed airborne SAR called SARAT. The radar is capable of obtaining full polarimetric L-band data with a resolution of 3 x 0.4 m. It is intended as a pre-SAOCOM test bench.

== International cooperation ==
These missions will be part of the Italian-Argentine System of Satellites for Emergency Management (SIASGE), together with the Italian COSMO-SkyMed missions (see related article Orfeo Programme). Knowing the great advantages of combining the information provided by L and X Band radars and the convenience of a shorter revisit period, Argentina and Italy are joining efforts to develop this system, which will be fully devoted the provision of information to lessen the consequences of natural disasters.

CONAE, in July 2003, joined the International Charter 'Space and Major Disasters', which aims to provide a unified system of space data acquisition and delivery to those affected by natural or man-made disasters through authorized users.

The agency secured an agreement with the European Space Agency on 24 June 2009, for the installation of a 35-m antenna and other mission support facilities at the Pierre Auger Observatory, near Malargüe, Mendoza. The facility will contribute to the ESA's Mars Express, Venus Express, and Rosetta space probe projects, as well as CONAE's own, domestic research and the ESA's planned Deep Space project. One of only three such ESA installations in the world, the new antenna will create a triangulation which will allow the ESA to ensure mission coverage around the clock.

== See also ==
- List of government space agencies
- INVAP – Argentine technology company
- ARSAT – Argentine government-owned telecommunications company incorporated in 2006
