= Conae =

Conae may refer to:

- CONAE, Argentina space agency
- 7213 Conae main belt asteroid
