= SAOCOM =

Argentinian Earth observation satellite

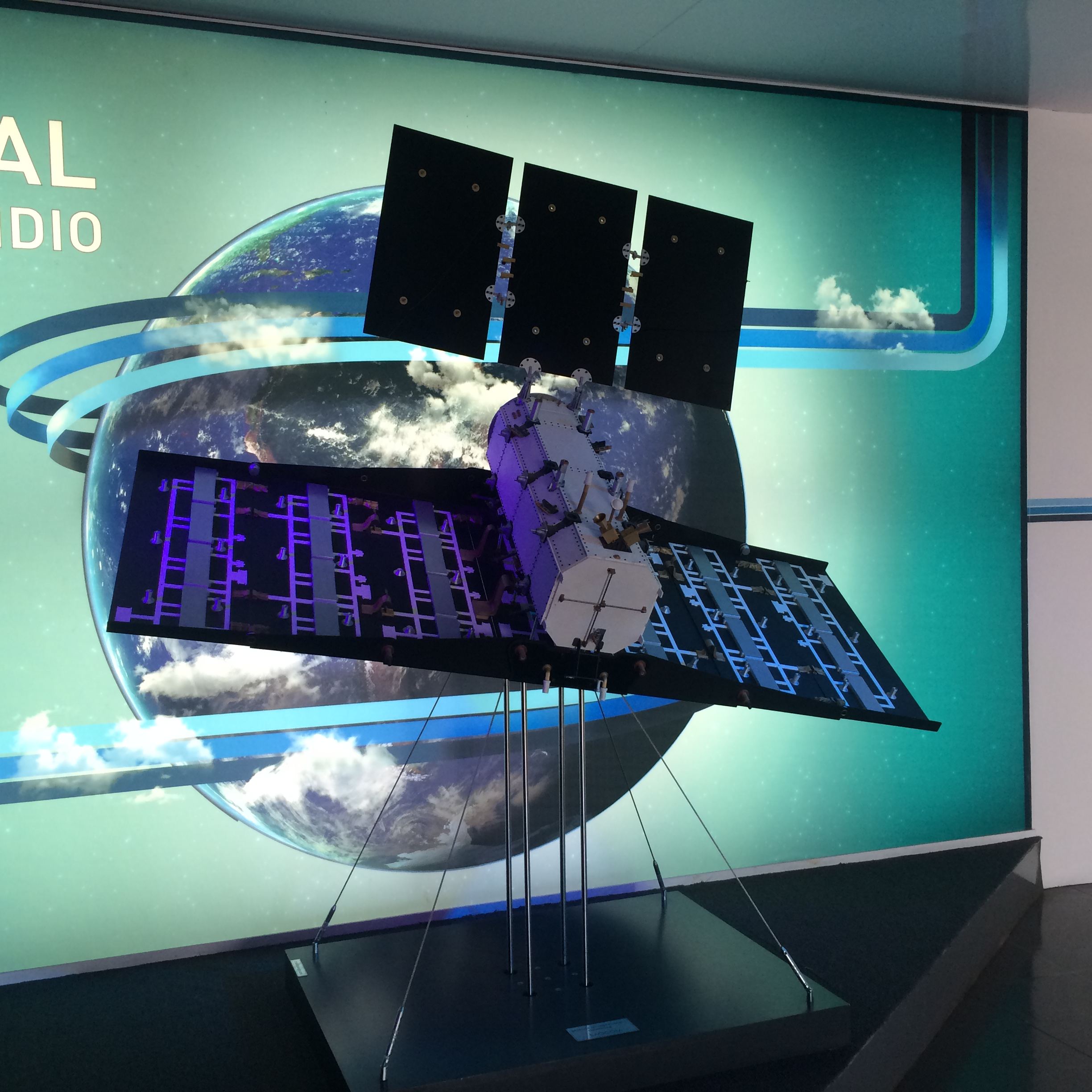
- Mockup of the SAOCOM satellite.
- Mission type: Earth-observation satellites
- Operator: CONAE
- COSPAR ID: 2018-076A (SAOCOM 1A); 2020-059A (SAOCOM 1B)
- SATCAT no.: 43641 (SAOCOM 1A); 46265 (SAOCOM 1B)
- Mission duration: 5 years (planned)

Spacecraft properties
- Spacecraft: SAOCOM
- Bus: SAC-C
- Manufacturer: INVAP
- Launch mass: 3050 kg
- Dry mass: 1600 kg

Start of mission
- Launch date: 8 October 2018, 02:21:28 UTC (SAOCOM 1A); 30 August 2020, 23:19 UTC (SAOCOM 1B)
- Rocket: Falcon 9 Block 5
- Launch site: Vandenberg Air Force Base, SLC-4E (SAOCOM 1A); CCAFS, SLC-40 (SAOCOM 1B)
- Contractor: SpaceX

Orbital parameters
- Reference system: Geocentric orbit
- Regime: Sun-synchronous orbit
- Altitude: 620 km
- Inclination: 97.89°
- Period: 97.2 minutes
- Repeat interval: 16 days

Transponders
- Band: 1 L-band (each); 2 X-band (each)
- Coverage area: Earth

SAOCOM (Satélite Argentino de Observación COn Microondas, Spanish for Argentine Microwaves Observation Satellite) is an Earth observation satellite constellation of Argentina's space agency CONAE. Two satellites are already orbiting the Earth in a Sun-synchronous orbit. The second one was launched on 30 August 2020.

CONAE contracted the company INVAP as main contractor for the project.

== Configuration ==
The two satellites, SAOCOM 1A and SAOCOM 1B, both are equipped with an L-band (about 1.275 GHz) full polarimetric synthetic-aperture radar (SAR) to help predict and monitor the mitigation of natural disasters. Each satellite has a mass of 3,050 kg (6,720 lb).

== History ==
Due to delays in the development of satellites, both launches were postponed for 2012 and 2013. Further delays pushed the launch dates back tentatively towards 2014 and 2015. By 2016, SAOCOM 1A was scheduled for launch in December 2016, and SAOCOM 1B in December 2017. In April 2016, the launch dates for SAOCOM 1A and SAOCOM 1B were further pushed back to October 2017 and October 2018. SAOCOM 1A was eventually launched on 8 October 2018 and SAOCOM 1B was launched on 30 August 2020.

== SAOCOM 1A ==
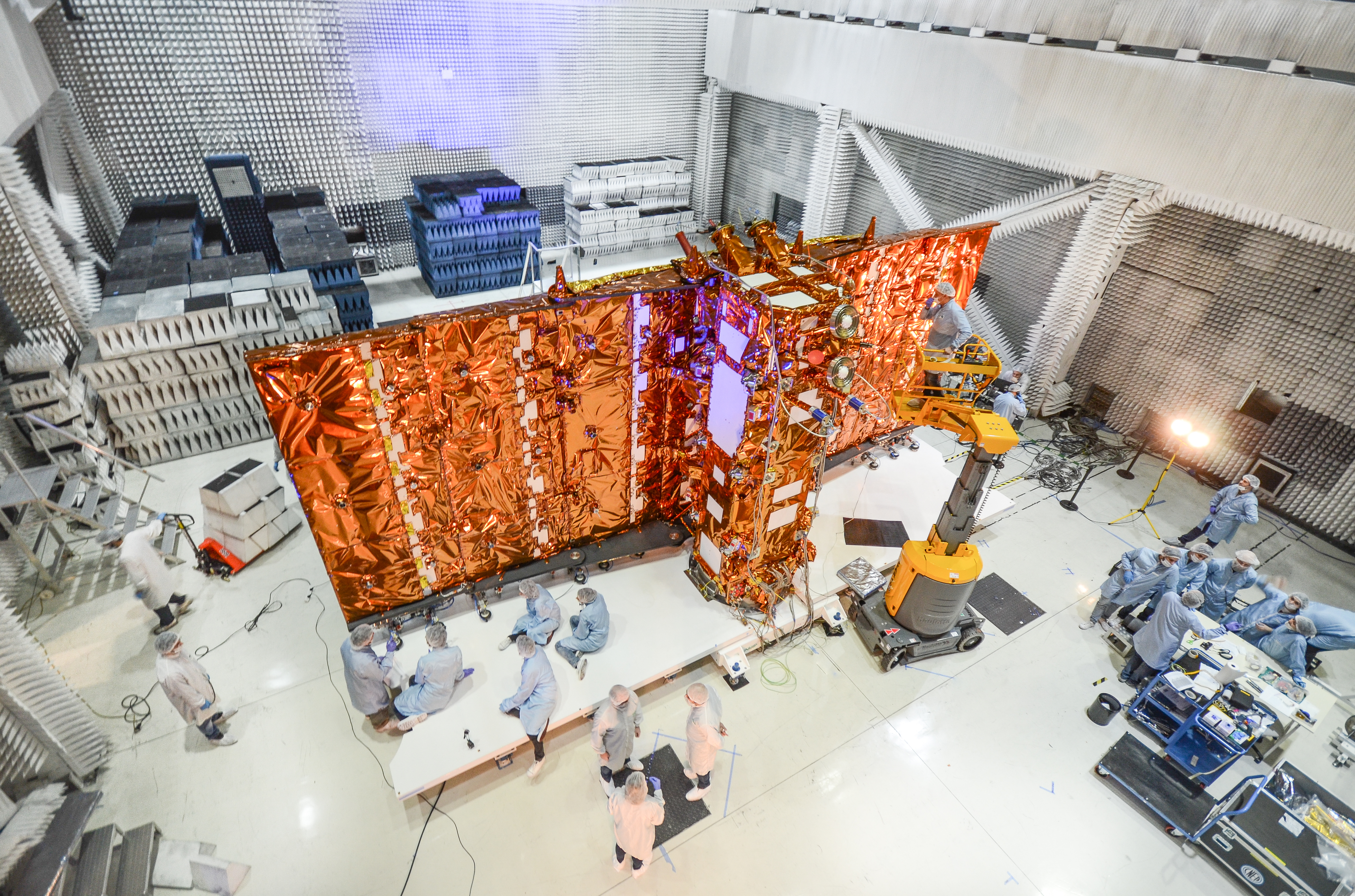
The satellite SAOCOM 1A at CEATSA, in Argentina, in July 2018.

SAOCOM 1A was launched on a polar orbit on 8 October 2018 at 02:21:28 UTC.

The SAOCOM (Satélite Argentino de Observación Con Microondas) constellation comprises two L-band SAR satellites. The mission is headed by Comisión Nacional de Actividades Espaciales (CONAE). INVAP is the prime contractor for the design and construction of the SAOCOM 1A spacecraft and its SAR payload. The SAOCOM 1A spacecraft benefit from the heritage of the SAC-C spacecraft platform.

Synthetic-aperture radar (SAR-L), an L-Band instrument featuring standard, high resolution and global coverage operational modes with resolution ranging from 7 to 100 m, and swath within 50 to 400 km. It features a dedicated high capacity Solid State Recorder (50 to 100 Gbits) for image storage, and a high bit rate downlink system (two X-band channels at 150 Mbits/s each).

The SAOCOM system operates jointly with the Italian COSMO-SkyMed constellation in X-band to provide frequent information relevant for emergency management. This approach of a two SAOCOM and a four COSMO-SkyMed spacecraft configuration offers an effective means of a twice-daily coverage capability. By joining forces, both agencies are able to generate SAR products in X-band and in L-band for their customers.

== SAOCOM 1B ==
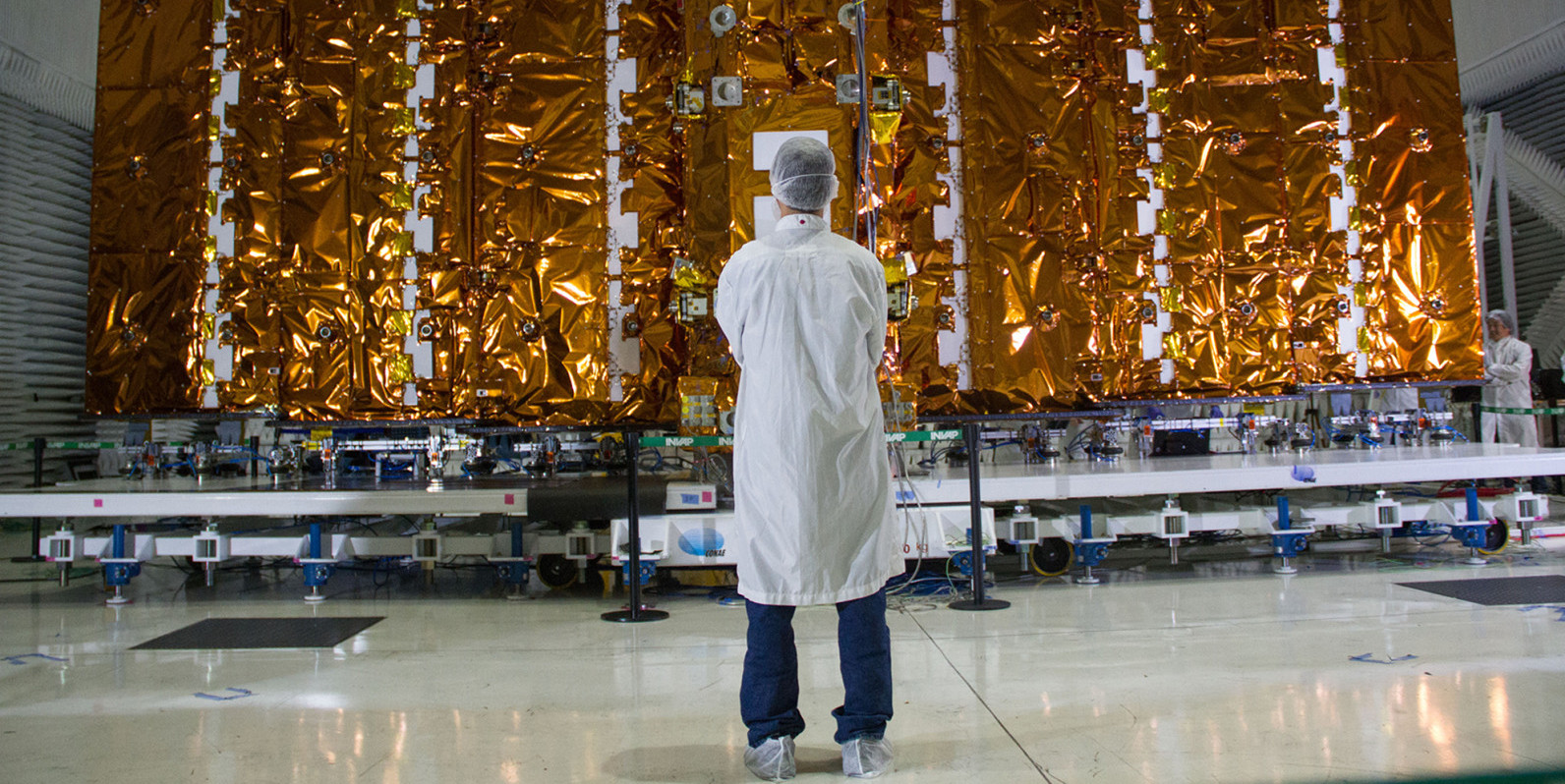
The satellite SAOCOM-1B in INVAP.

A SpaceX Falcon 9 rocket launched the SAOCOM 1B satellite for CONAE, Argentina's space agency, on 30 August 2020. SAOCOM 1B is the second of two SAOCOM 1-series Earth observation satellites designed to provide radar imagery to help emergency responders and monitor the environment, including the collection of soil moisture measurements. This mission was originally scheduled to launch January 2020 from Vandenberg Air Force Base, California but was launched from Cape Canaveral on 30 August 2020 at 23:18 UTC which make it the first use of the southern polar corridor to reach orbit from the Cape Canaveral since 1969. SAOCOM-1b is in a Sun-synchronous orbit.

Two small rideshare payloads are ridden into orbit with SAOCOM 1B. After releasing SAOCOM 1B around 14 minutes into the mission, the Falcon 9 deployed two smaller satellites named GNOMES 1 and Tyvak 0172 about an hour after liftoff, according to SpaceX.

== Launch and operations ==
SAOCOM 1A was launched on 8 October 2018, at 02:22 UTC. The satellite was deployed into a polar orbit. The Falcon 9 rocket booster landed as planned at Landing Zone 4 at the Vandenberg Air Force Base, making it SpaceX's first land landing for a launch occurring on the Pacific coast.

The same orbit is used for SAOCOM 1B on launch from Cape Canaveral Air Force Station, pad SLC-40. This is an unusual launch from Cape Canaveral as the trajectory turned back to the west to skirt the southern coast of Florida and then fly over Cuba for the polar orbit. The four-time-flown Falcon 9 rocket booster successfully landed as planned at Landing Zone 1 at the Cape Canaveral, just a few miles from the launch site.

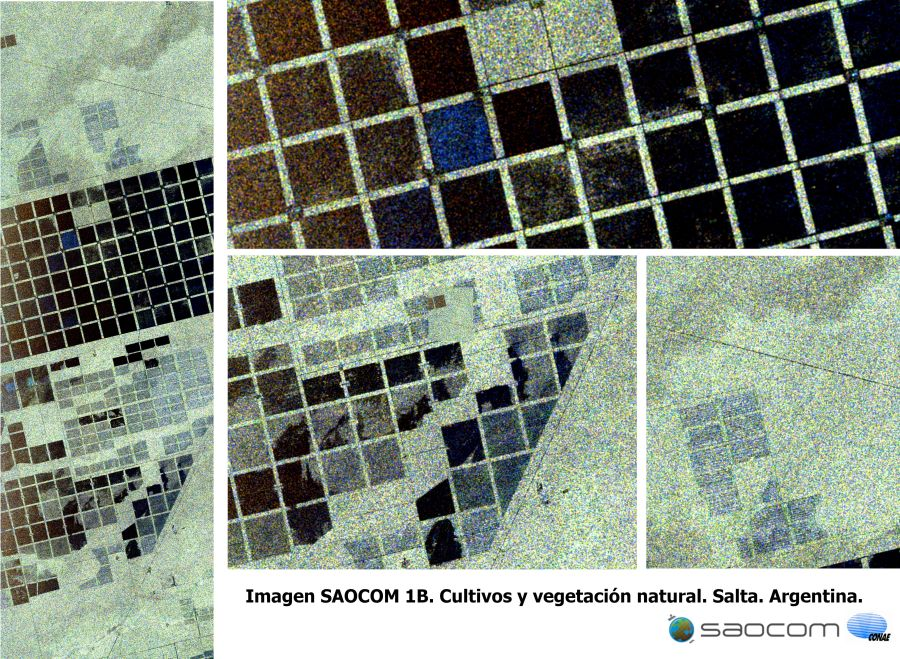

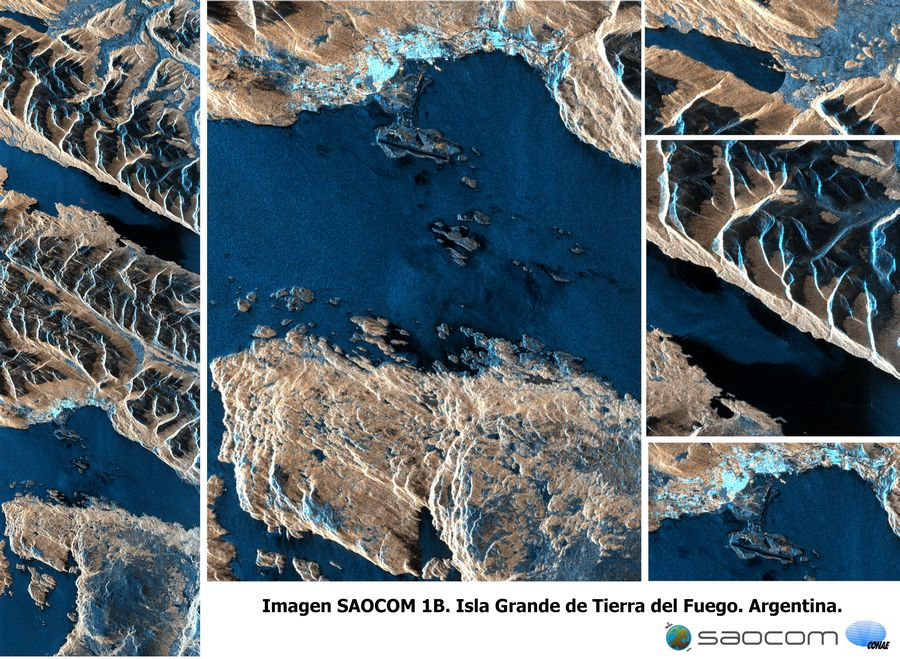

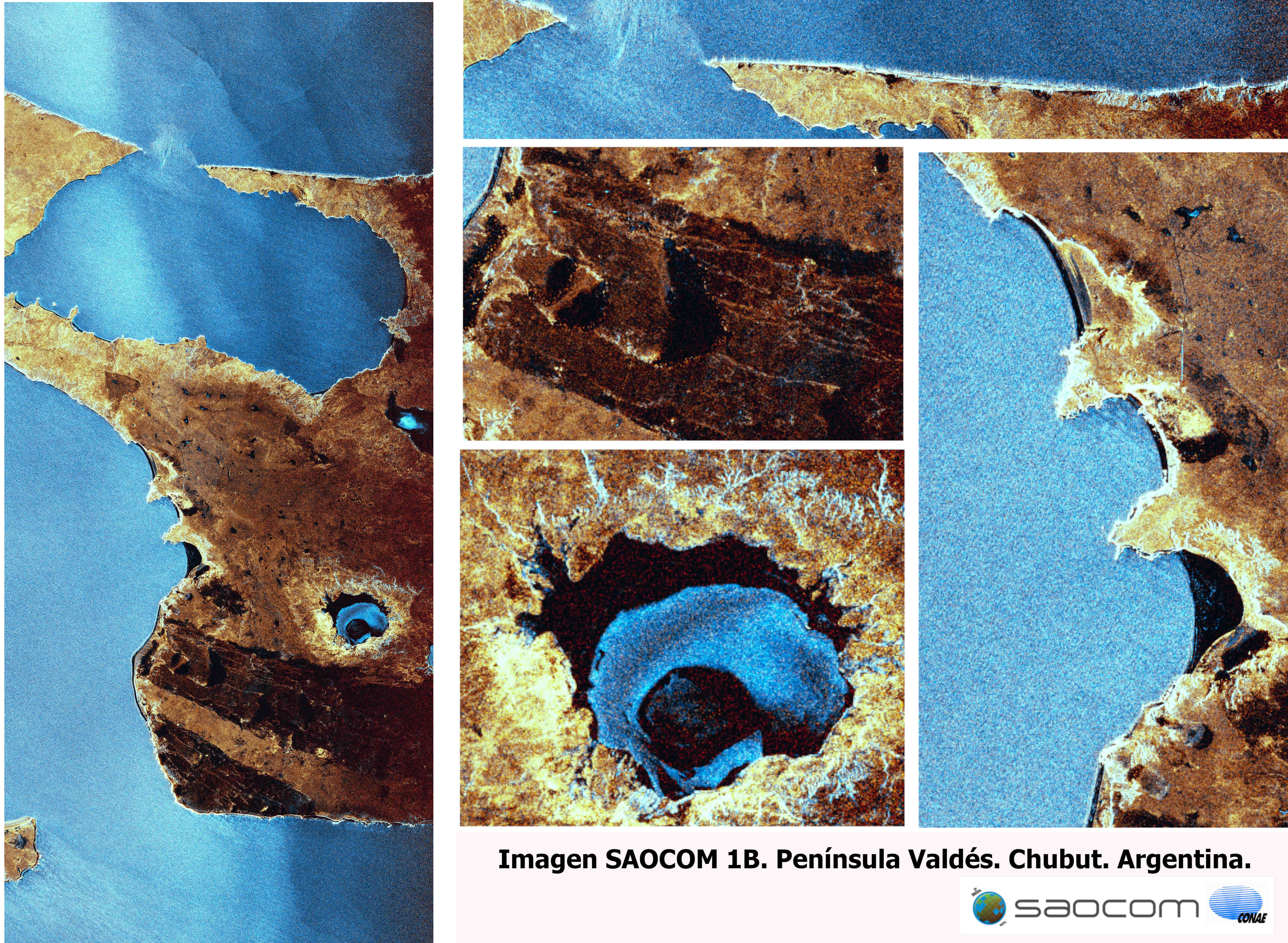

== SIASGE constellation ==
These two satellites operate jointly with four X-band (~9.6 GHz) SAR-equipped COSMO-SkyMed satellites from the Italian Space Agency (ASI), to form the Italian-Argentine System of Satellites for Emergency Management (Sistema Italo-Argentino de Satélites para la Gestión de Emergencias) (SIASGE) constellation. A successful design review was held at the Argentinian space centre Teófilo Tabanera near the city of Córdoba, Argentina on 16 and 17 October 2012. In May 2015, the two agencies decided to expand the SIAGSE system by adding two additional COSMO-SkyMed (CSG-1 and CSG-2) satellites and two additional SAOCOM satellites, SAOCOM 2A (launch in August 2028) and SAOCOM 2B (launch in August 2030). This would raise the SIAGSE constellation total number of satellites to 10.
