= Satellite flare =

Visual phenomenon caused by satellites

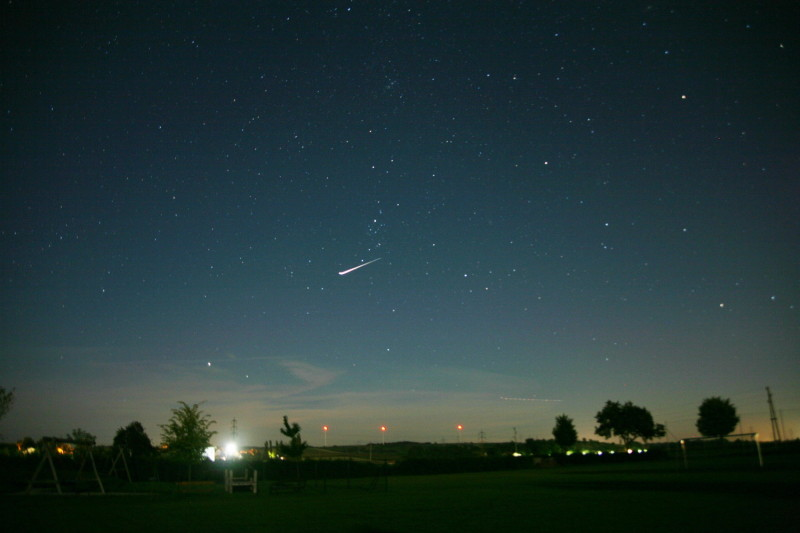
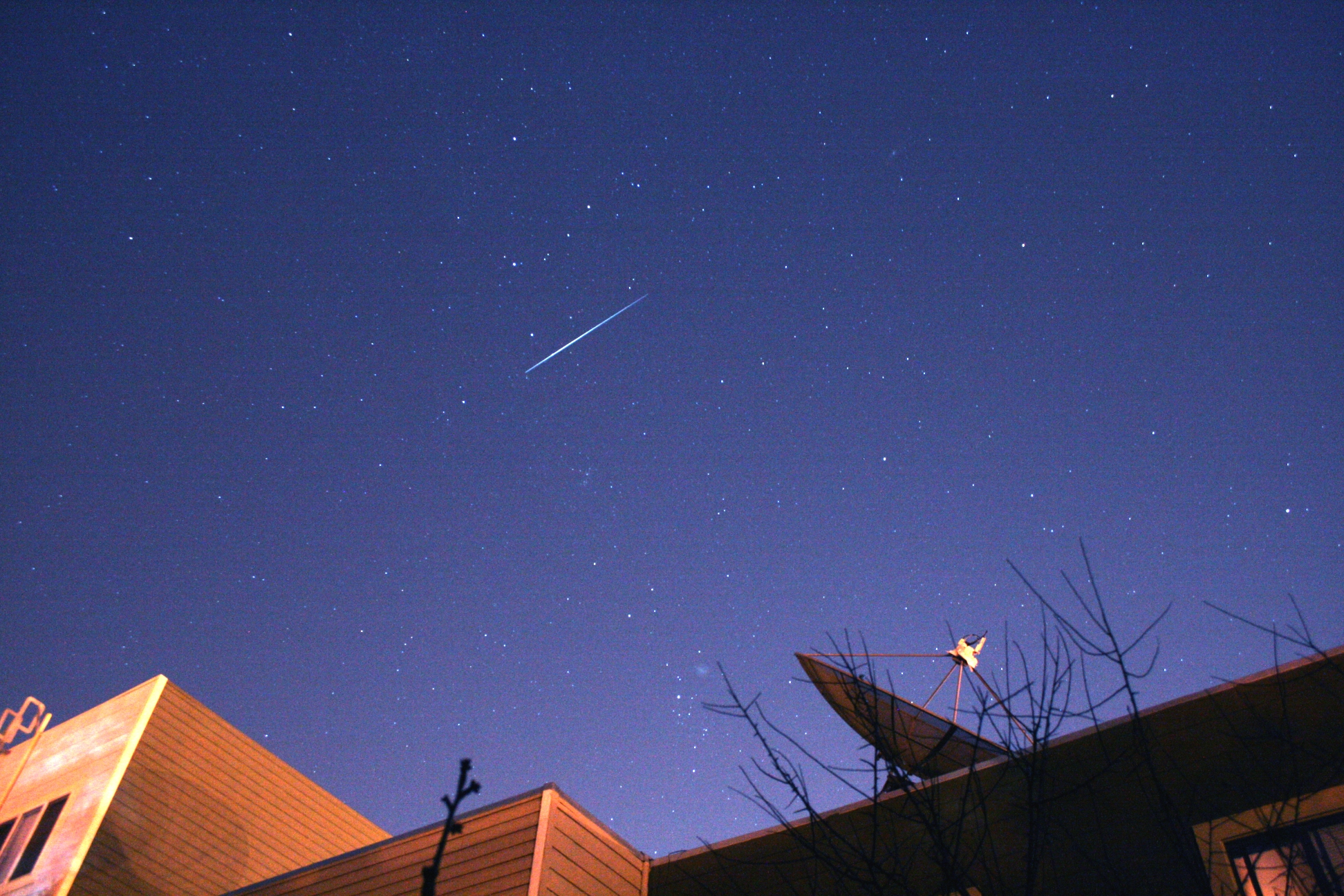
- Top: a simulated animation of a typical Iridium flare
- Bottom: Both images show a flare of an Iridium satellite. Comet Holmes can be seen in the right image, slightly above the tree branch.

Satellite flare, also known as satellite glint, is a brief and bright "flare" in visibility of a satellite. It is caused by the temporary direct reflection of light from the surface of a spacecraft in orbit, such as from its solar panels or antennas (e.g., synthetic aperture radar), toward an observer. As a form of light pollution it can negatively affect ground-based astronomy, stargazing, and indigenous people.

Many satellites flare with magnitudes bright enough to see with the unaided eye, i.e. brighter than magnitude +6.5. Smaller magnitude numbers are brighter, so negative magnitudes are brighter than positive magnitudes, i.e. the scale is reverse logarithmic.

The Iridium constellation was one of the first anthropogenic sources of near-space light pollution to draw criticism. Larger satellite constellations, like OneWeb and Starlink, have received increased criticism. Scientific and policy analyses have raised questions about which regulatory bodies hold jurisdiction over human actions that obscure starlight in ways that affect astronomy, stargazers, and indigenous communities.

== Controlled satellites ==
Flaring from reflection of the Sun

The time and place of the satellite's flare can be predicted only when the satellite is controlled, and its orientation in space is known. In this case it is possible to predict the exact time of the flare, its place in the sky, the brightness and duration.

=== Iridium flares ===
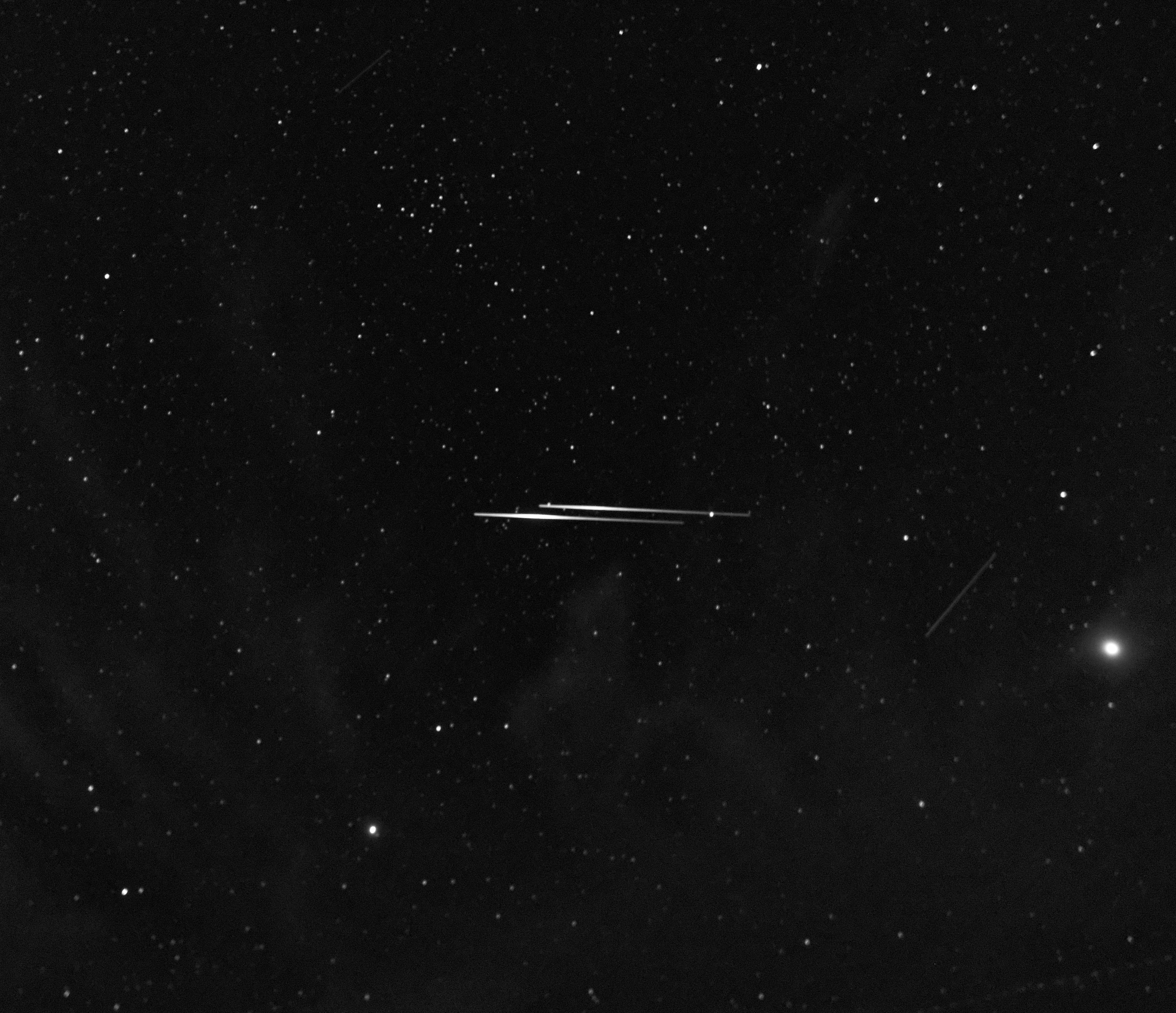
Double flare - Iridium 6 and its replacement, #51, both flare in a 21-second exposure.

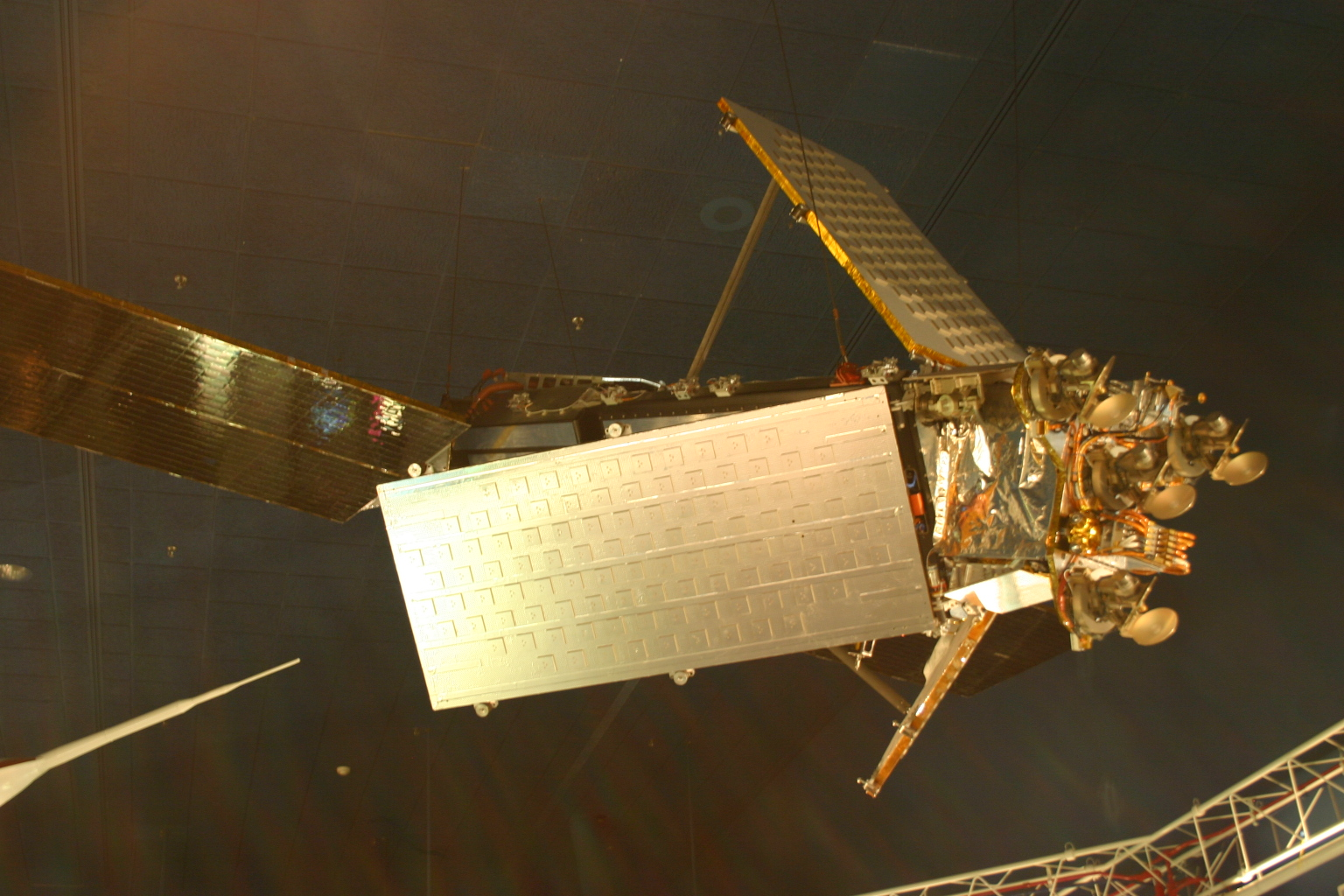
First-generation Iridium satellite. Antennas can be seen in front, and solar panels in the back.

The first generation of the Iridium constellation launched a total of 95 telecommunication satellites in low Earth orbit which were known to cause Iridium flares, the brightest flares of all orbiting satellites, starting in 1997. From 2017 to 2019 they were replaced with a new generation that does not produce flares, with the first generation completely deorbited by 27 December 2019.

While the first-generation Iridium satellites were still controlled, their flares could be predicted. These Iridium communication satellites had three polished door-sized antennas, 120° apart and at 40° angles with the main bus. The forward antenna faced the direction the satellite is traveling. Occasionally, an antenna reflects sunlight directly down at Earth, creating a predictable and quickly moving illuminated spot on the surface below of about 10 km (6 mi) diameter. To an observer this looks like a bright flash, or flare in the sky, with a duration of a few seconds.

Ranging up to −9.5 magnitude, some of the flares were so bright that they could be seen in the daytime. This flashing caused some annoyance to astronomers, as the flares occasionally disturbed observations.

As the Iridium constellation consisted of 66 working satellites, Iridium flares were visible quite often (2 to 4 times per night). Flares of brightness −5 magnitude occurred 3 to 4 times per week, and −8 magnitude were visible 3 to 5 times per month for stationary observers.

Flares could also occur from solar panels, but they were not as bright (up to −3.5 magnitude). Such flares lasted about twice as long as those from the main mission antennas (MMA), because the so-called "mirror angle" for the solar panels was twice that for the MMAs. There were also rare cases of flares from MMAs and solar panels, or two MMAs (front and either right or left) of one satellite in a single pass.

The flares were bright enough to be seen at night in big cities where light pollution usually prevents most stellar observation. When not flaring, the satellites were often visible crossing the night sky at a typical magnitude of 6, similar to a dim star.

=== Mega-constellations ===
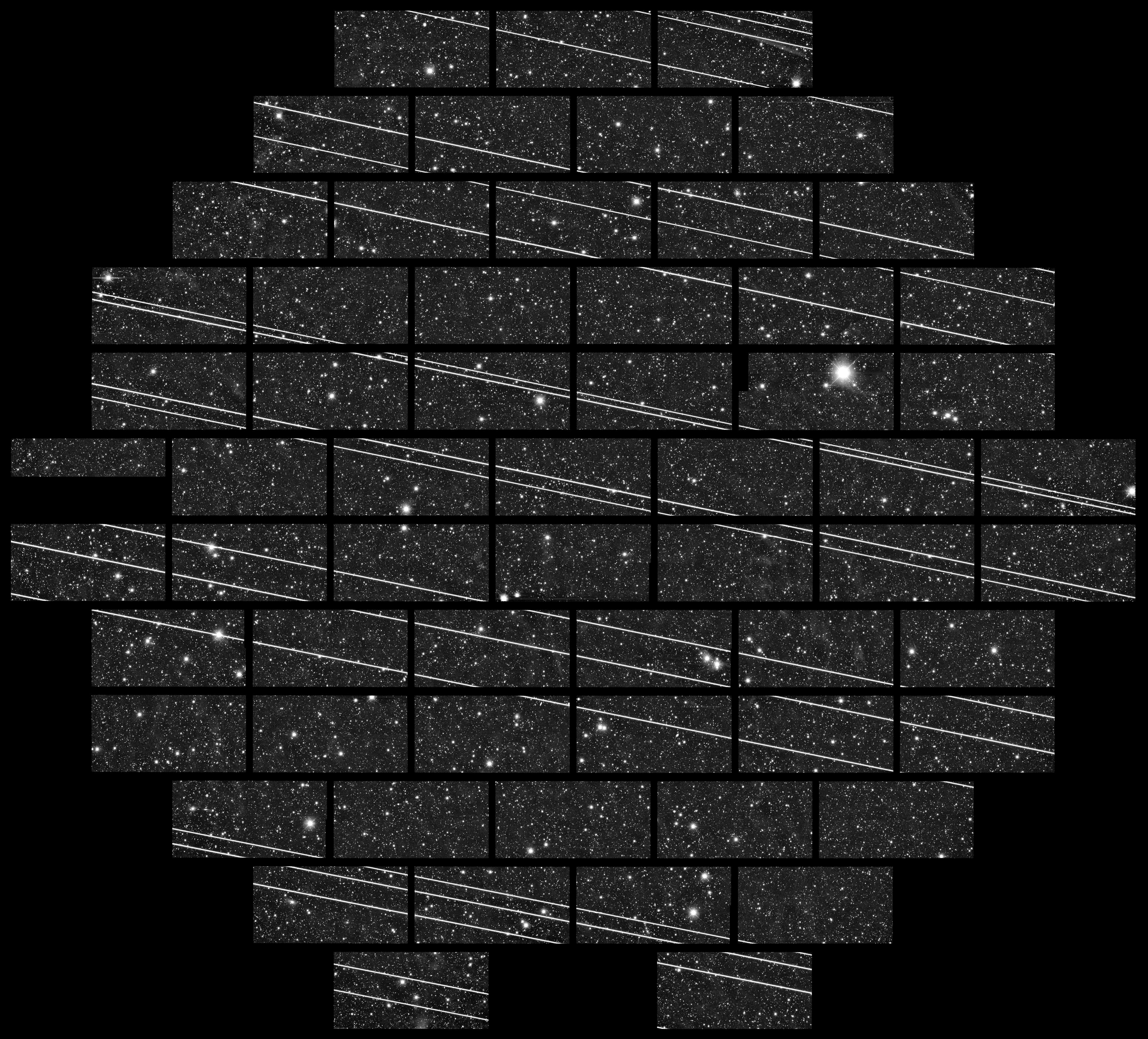
333 seconds-exposure containing 19 streaks due to Starlink satellites

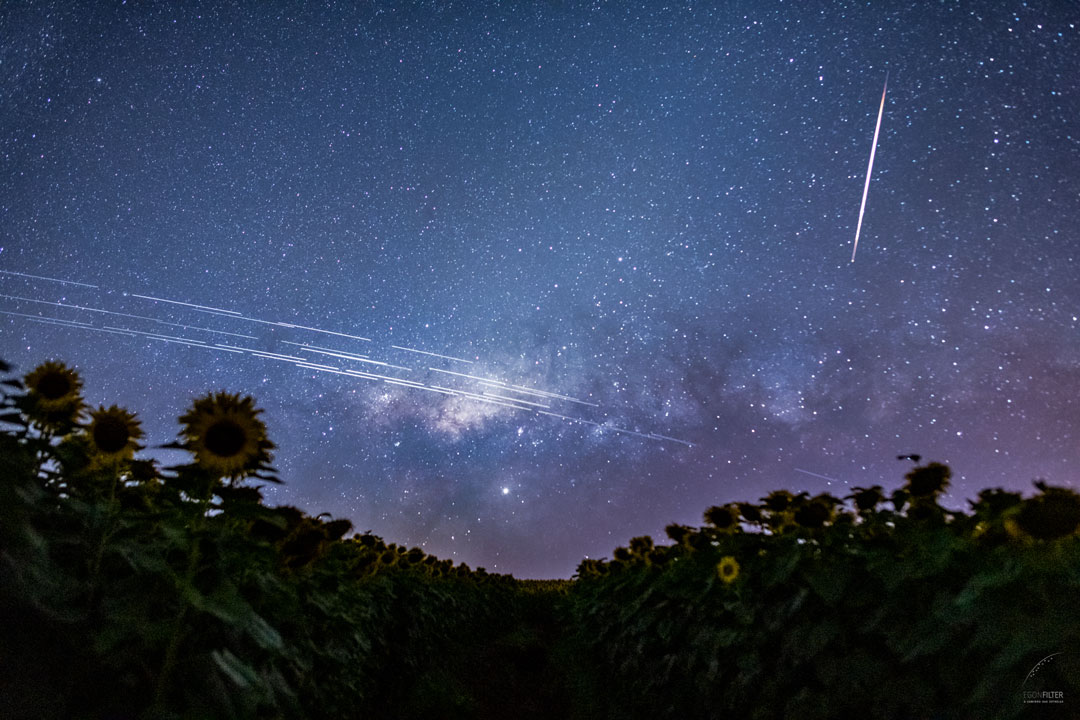
Starlink Satellite Trails over Brazil alongside a shooting star - NASA's Astronomy Picture of the Day, 10 December 2019.

Low-orbit satellite constellations such as Starlink are a concern for astronomers, stargazers, and indigenous communities because of light pollution.

In February 2020, the Russian Academy of Sciences said it would send a letter to the United Nations complaining that Starlink's satellites will damage "30-40% of astronomical images." In addition to their impact on ground-based astronomy, the ongoing expansion of mega-constellations has the potential to harm spaced-based telescope observations.

Numerous satellite operators have criticized SpaceX for attempting to overwhelm the FCC with paperwork as a means to gain approval to launch 42,000 satellites, which has raised questions about which aspects of space law pertain to light pollution from satellites.

SpaceX and Elon Musk have asserted in meetings with the National Academy of Sciences and in FCC filings that "SpaceX is committed to reducing satellite brightness to allow enjoyment of the skies and not thwart scientific discovery" and that its objectives are (1) to "make the satellites generally invisible to the naked eye within a week of launch", and (2) to "minimize Starlink's impact on astronomy by darkening satellites so they do not saturate observatory detectors." There are more than 10,400 Starlink satellites in orbit as of June 2026.

=== Starlink Flares ===
Starlink satellites can flare repeatedly in an isolated area of the sky, typically directly above the sun (below the horizon) as they transit the highest latitude of their orbits. This phenomenon is most obvious when satellites are low over the horizon, and is due to the large number of Starlink satellites that are orbiting the Earth, predominantly at ~53° orbital inclination.

The flares from Starlink have been misidentified as UFOs by airline pilots due to their unusual repetitive nature, which is visually analogous to a car's headlights at night getting brighter (then dimmer) as it rounds a turn. At cruising altitudes for commercial aircraft at night, pilots looking toward the setting or rising sun can often see the "racetrack" reflections from multiple satellites in criss-crossing orbits. As of 2026 there were a number of 'mystery light' sightings in Australia that were later identified as Starlink flares using Astronomy software applications.

=== Indigenous astronomy ===
Satellite constellations also present challenges to Indigenous astronomy and traditional practices that rely on the night sky, such as Polynesian wayfinding.

=== Other satellite flares ===
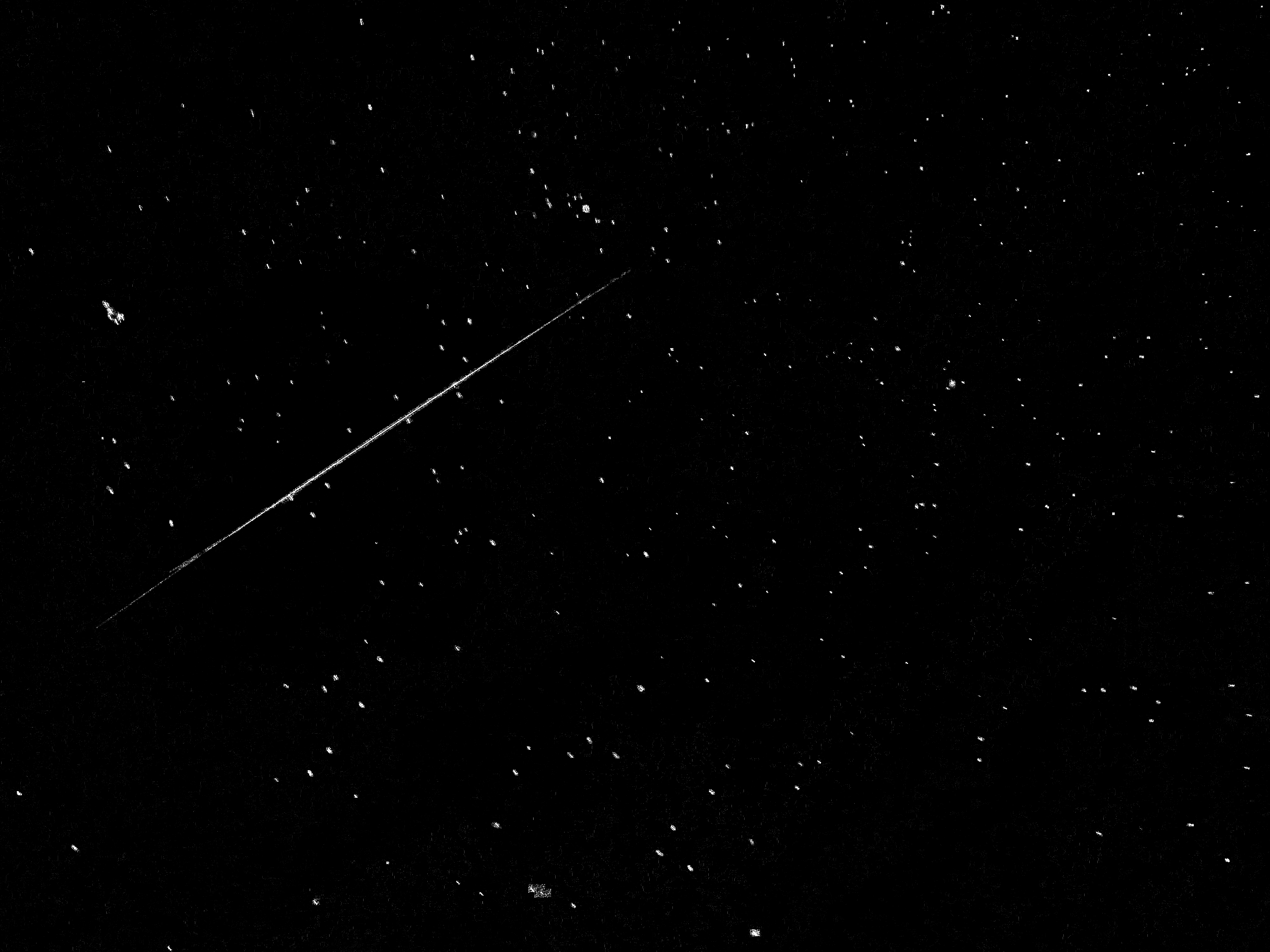
A COSMO-SkyMed flare

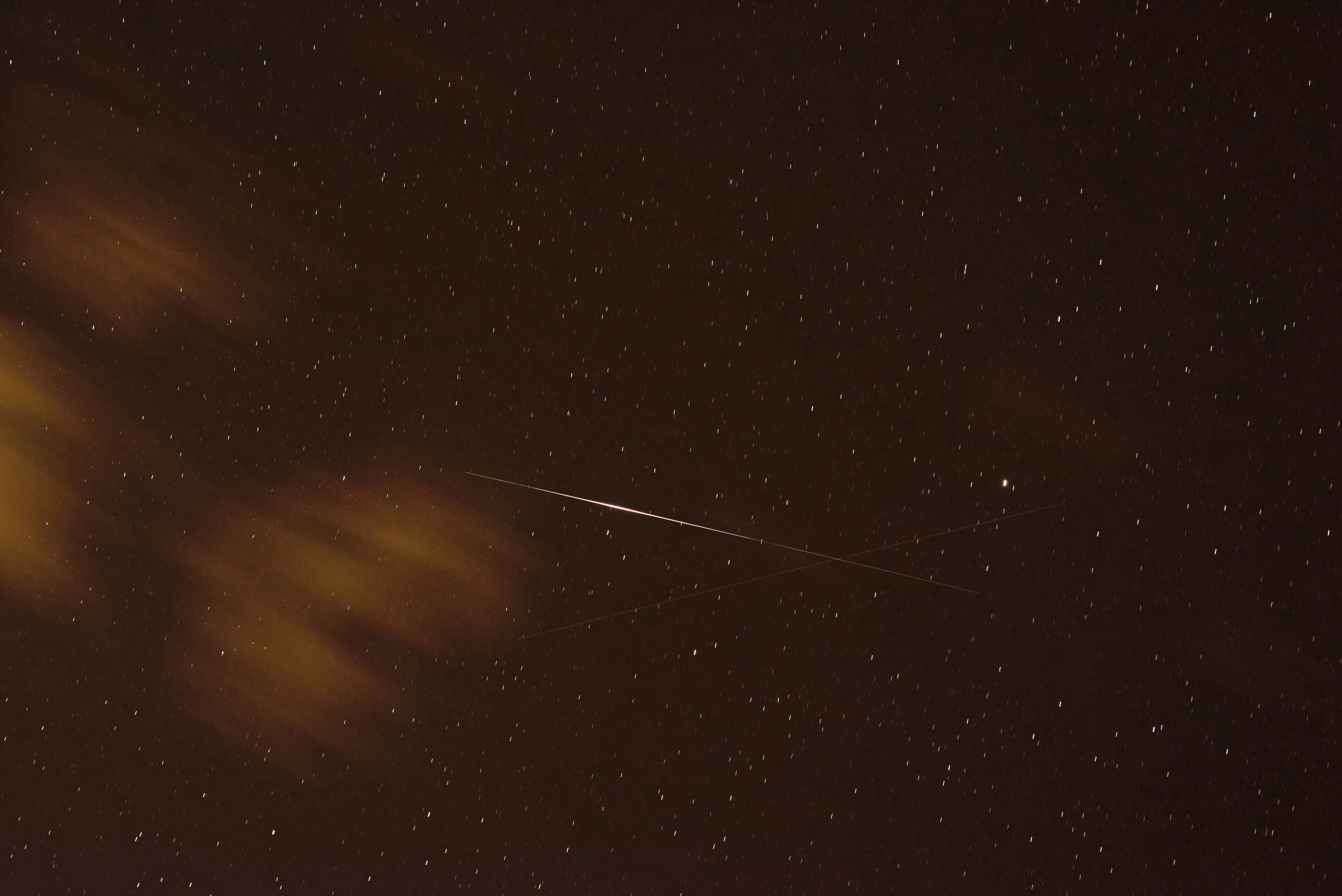
A MetOp-A flare

Many other controlled satellites also flare to magnitudes visible to the naked eye, i.e. larger than +6.5.

MetOp-B and C, however, can produce predictable flares up to −5 magnitude (MetOp-A is no longer controlled) . Four COSMO-SkyMed satellites can produce flares up to -3 magnitude, and lasting much longer than the Iridium flares. The Terrasar X and Tandem X also can produce predictable flares up to -3 magnitude.

The International Space Station (ISS) is known to cause bright ISS flares.

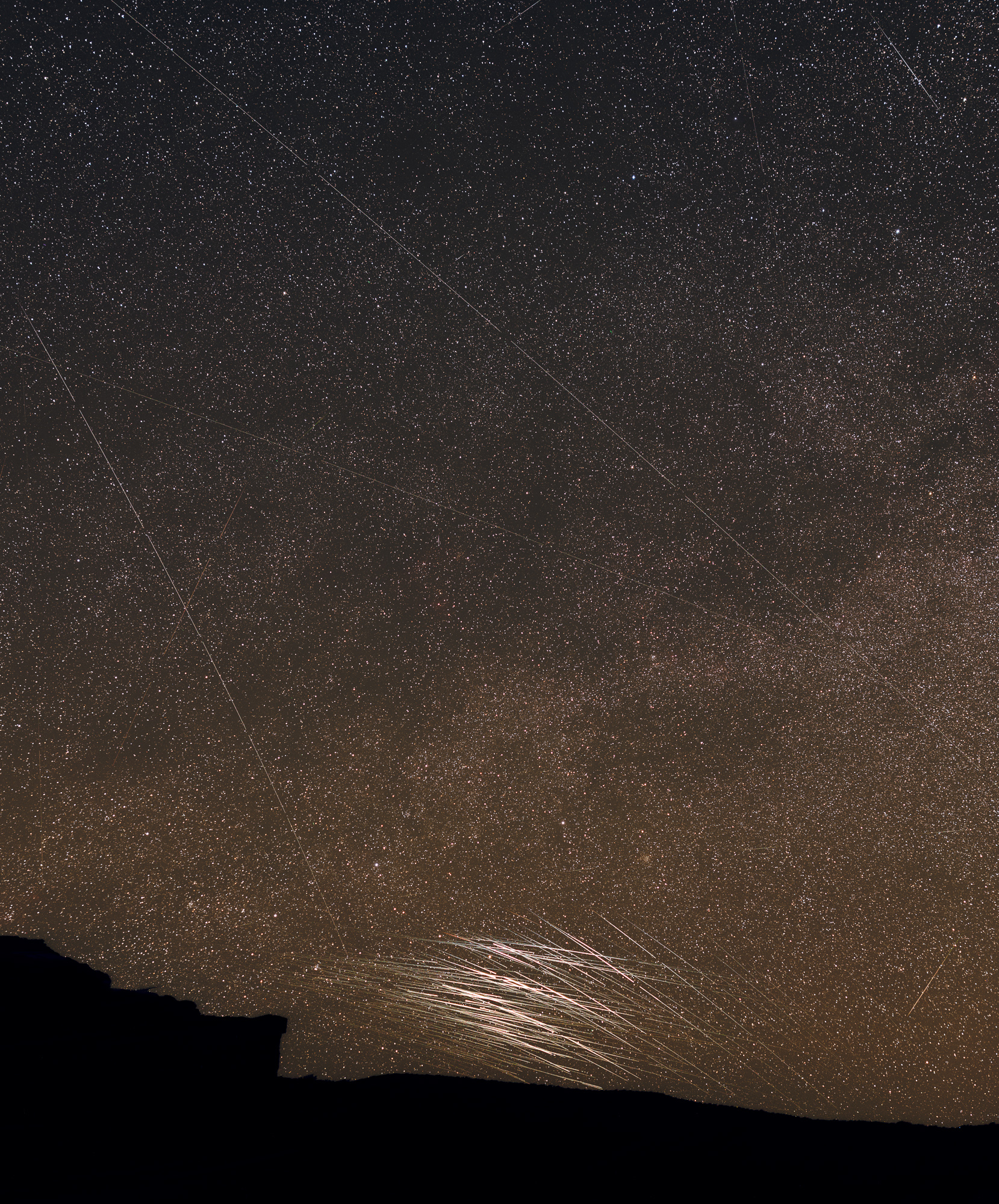
Composite image showing 27 minutes of Starlink satellite flares near the constellation Cassiopeia, 4/24/23

== Uncontrolled satellites ==
When a satellite goes out of control, it becomes possible to predict only a trajectory of its pass, while it becomes virtually impossible to accurately predict any flaring. These non-operational satellites are also described as "tumbling". This category includes many rotating rocket bodies, some failed Iridium satellites, ALOS satellite (which can produce flashes up to −10 mag), etc. The most important and valuable information about tumbling satellites is the period of flashes. It can vary from 0.5 seconds (rapidly rotating objects) to a minute or more (slowly rotating objects). Other important characteristics are the amplitude of changes in brightness and period of repetition of these changes.

== Observation ==
Satellite flares are visible in this timelapse of the Hello, World photo sequence taken from the Artemis II spacecraft. Below the flaring satellites, aurorae, airglow, afterglow, and lightning are also visible.

While satellites may be seen by chance, there are websites and mobile apps this provide location-specific information as to when and where in the sky a satellite flare may be seen (for controlled satellites), or trajectory of a tumbling satellite's pass (for uncontrolled satellites) in the sky.

Reflections from satellites and other human space objects are sometimes reported as unidentified flying objects (UFOs), and are often a result of repetitive observations in an isolated area of the sky over a short time period.

== See also ==
- NanoSail-D
- Humanity Star
