= COSMO-1 =

Imaging satellite

- Names: COSMO-SkyMed 1
- Mission type: Radar imaging
- Operator: ASI / MDD
- COSPAR ID: 2007-023A
- SATCAT no.: 31598
- Mission duration: 5 years (planned); 17 years, 8 months and 25 days (in progress)

Spacecraft properties
- Spacecraft: COSMO-SkyMed 1
- Bus: PRIMA
- Manufacturer: Thales Alenia Space
- Launch mass: 1,700 kg (3,700 lb)

Start of mission
- Launch date: 8 June 2007, 02:34:00 UTC
- Rocket: Delta II 7420-10C (D324)
- Launch site: Vandenberg, SLC-2W
- Contractor: United Launch Alliance
- Entered service: 2007

Orbital parameters
- Reference system: Geocentric orbit
- Regime: Sun-synchronous orbit
- Perigee altitude: 628.7 km (390.7 mi)
- Apogee altitude: 630.7 km (391.9 mi)
- Inclination: 97.88°
- Period: 97.16 minutes

COSMO-1 or COSMO-SkyMed 1 is an Italian radar imaging satellite. Launched in 2007, it was the first of four COSMO-SkyMed satellites to be placed into orbit. The spacecraft is operated by the Italian Space Agency (ASI), in conjunction with Italy's Ministry of Defence. It uses synthetic-aperture radar to produce images for civilian, commercial and military purposes.

== Spacecraft description ==
COSMO-1 was constructed by Thales Alenia Space, based on the PRIMA (PRecursore IperSpettrale della Missione Applicativa) satellite bus. It was the first PRIMA-based spacecraft to be launched. Designed for a five-year mission.

== Launch ==
ASI awarded Boeing a contract to launch COSMO-1, with the launch being subcontracted to United Launch Alliance when it was formed to take over Delta launch operations. The launch took place at 02:34:00 UTC on 8 June 2007. A Delta II launch vehicle in the 7420-10C configuration, flight number Delta 324, lifted off from SLC-2W at Vandenberg Air Force Base, successfully injecting the satellite into low Earth orbit. Spacecraft separation occurred 58 minutes and 5 seconds after liftoff.

== Mission ==
The satellite operates in a Sun-synchronous orbit. An orbit with a perigee of 629 km (391 mi), an apogee of 631 km (392 mi), inclined at 97.88° to the equator. It has an orbital period of 97.16 minutes.
