= Centauro (sounding rocket) =

Argentinian solid fuel sounding rockets

The Centauro series is a family of Argentinian solid-fuel sounding rockets developed by the Instituto de Investigaciones Aeronauticas y Espaciales (IIAE). This family includes Alfa, Beta, and Gamma Centauro.

Alfa Centauro was a single-stage rocket, launched in 1961 from Santo Tomás base.

Beta Centauro followed the same year, demonstrating two-stage capability and leading to advancements in payload delivery and high altitude measurements. Further launches from Santo Tomás and CELPA Chamical refined rocketry techniques. Notably, the "sodium cloud" operation in 1963 provided valuable atmospheric data.

The Gamma Centauro, also a two-stage vehicle, was tested after 1964, notably from Antarctica.

== Alfa Centauro ==
Alfa Centauro
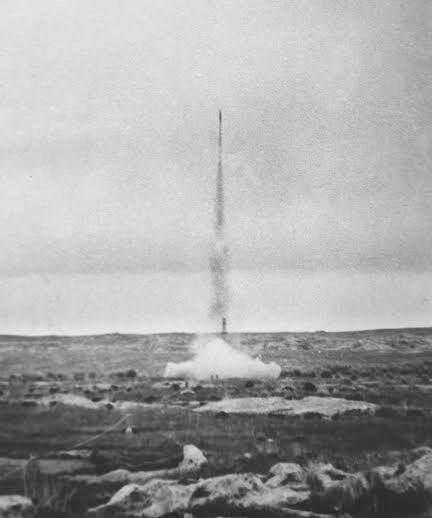
- Alfa Centauro first launch (APEX A1-02)
- Function: sounding rocket
- Manufacturer: Instituto de Investigaciones Aeronauticas y Espaciales (IIAE)
- Country of origin: Argentina

Size
- Height: 2.705 m
- Diameter: 101 mm
- Mass: 28 kg
- Stages: 1

Capacity

Launch history
- Launch sites: Santo Tomás base
- Total launches: 14
- First flight: February 2, 1961

First stage
- Specific impulse: 200 s
- Burn time: 1.23 s
- Propellant: Solid (nitrocellulose, nitroglycerin and additives)
- Fuel & Oxidizer mass/volume: 11 kg

Built entirely in Argentina and under the control of the Argentine Air Force, Alfa Centauro measured 2.7 m in length and 101 mm in diameter (at the warhead), with a total maximum weight of 28 kg and only 3.3 kg of payload. The solid fuel used consisted of a mix of nitrocellulose, nitroglycerin and additives.

=== Details ===
The main characteristics of the Alfa Centauro sounding rocket were:

- Apogee: 20 km
- Payload: 3.3 kg
- Length: 2705 mm
- Launch weight: 28 kg
- Payload length: 1088 mm
- Payload diameter: 101 mm
- Delta-v: 1800 kg/sec.
- Specific impulse: 200 s
- Burn time: 1.23 s
- Rocket motor length: 1617 mm
- Rocket motor diameter: 94 mm
- Propellant weight: ~11 kg

=== Flights ===
The first launch took place on February 2, 1961, from the Santo Tomás base in the Achala Pampa in the province of Córdoba. The rocket was named APEX A1-02 and reached an altitude of 20 km.

== Beta Centauro ==
Beta Centauro
- Function: sounding rocket
- Manufacturer: Instituto de Investigaciones Aeronauticas y Espaciales (IIAE)
- Country of origin: Argentina

Size
- Height: 3.812 m
- Diameter: 94 mm
- Mass: 47.3 kg
- Stages: 2

Capacity

Launch history
- Launch sites: Santo Tomás base, CELPA Chamical
- First flight: September 30, 1961

First stage
- Specific impulse: 200 s
- Burn time: 1.23 s
- Propellant: Solid (nitrocellulose, nitroglycerin and additives)
- Fuel & Oxidizer mass/volume: 11 kg

Second stage
- Burn time: 1 s
- Propellant: 4.5 kg

Beta Centauro, a two-stage sounding rocket, had a length of 3,812 mm. The first stage (similar to Alfa Centauro) measured 1,769 mm with a diameter of 94 mm, and the second stage was 1,173 mm long with 79.5 mm in diameter.

=== Details ===
The main characteristics of the Beta Centauro sounding rocket were:

- Apogee: 25 km
- Payload: 3.3 kg
- Length: 3700 mm
- Launch weight: 47.3 kg
- Specific impulse: 200 s
- First stage length: 1769 mm
- First stage delta-v: 1800 kg/sec.
- First stage burn time: 1.23 s
- First stage diameter: 94 mm
- First stage propellant weight: ~11 kg
- Second stage length: 1173 mm
- Second stage delta-v: 900 kg/sec.
- Second stage burn time: 1 s
- Second stage diameter: 79.5 mm
- Second stage propellant weight: ~4.5 kg

=== Flights ===
Beta Centauro was first launched on September 30, 1961. The rocket was designated APEX-A1-S2-015 and aimed to experiment with the separation of the two stages and to test the measurements and instruments of the vehicle: flight speed, range, atmospheric pressure, among other parameters. The launch was successful, and the rocket reached an altitude of 25 km.

On October 13, 1961, the Aerospace Institute conducted the second launch of the rocket (APEX-A1-S2-016) at the same base. Another Centauro rocket was launched on May 10, 1962, coinciding with the start of activities at the CELPA base in Chamical, La Rioja.

On February 19, 1962, five new launches were carried out from the Santo Tomás Base, where the new Scar 2.65 engines were tested for the first time, successfully recovering the capsules with their payloads in all cases, allowing the measurement of the altitude at which the separation occurred.

On November 15, 27, and 30, Centauro rockets were launched, the last two for aeronomy purposes, all three launched from the CELPA Chamical base, La Rioja province. On December 8 and 9, Centauro rockets were launched again, also for aeronomy purposes and with successful results. Throughout that year, the experiments were successful and yielded significant advances, with a total of 18 launches carried out.

On May 25, 1963, the Centauro 35 launch was undertaken for the "sodium cloud" operation, resulting in wind and turbulence measurements, reaching an altitude of 189 km.

Experiments with the Beta Centauro allowed for the refinement of payload takeoff and altitude measurements, continuing from 1964 with the Orion sounding rocket.

== Gamma Centauro ==
Gama Centauro
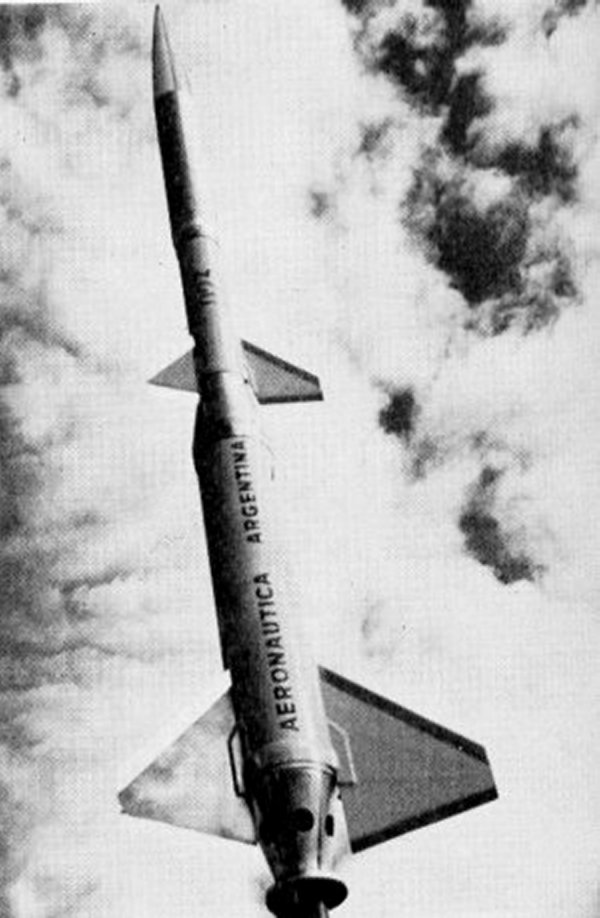
- Gamma Centauro in flight
- Function: sounding rocket
- Manufacturer: Instituto de Investigaciones Aeronauticas y Espaciales (IIAE)
- Country of origin: Argentina

Size
- Height: 2.430 m
- Diameter: 130 mm
- Mass: 27 kg
- Stages: 2

Capacity

Launch history
- Launch sites: Puente del Inca, Matienzo Base, CELPA Chamical
- Total launches: 13
- First flight: December 6, 1962
- Last flight: February 8, 1965

First stage
- Specific impulse: 225 s
- Propellant: solid
- Fuel & Oxidizer mass/volume: 11 kg

Second stage
- Specific impulse: 212 s
- Propellant: solid

Gamma Centauro was a two-stage rocket, with a length of 2.43 m and a diameter of 13 cm, capable of sending a 5 kg payload to an apogee of 59 km.

=== Details ===
Main characteristics of the Gamma Centauro sounding rocket were:

- Apogee: 59 km
- Payload: 5 kg
- Length: 2430 mm
- Launch weight: 27 kg
- First stage specific impulse: 225 s
- First stage length: 800 mm
- First stage diameter: 130 mm
- First stage propellant weight: 11 kg
- Second stage specific impulse: 212 s
- Second stage length: 1600 mm
- Second stage diameter: 90 mm
- Second stage propellant weight: ~4 kg

=== Flights ===
Gamma Centauro was first tested on December 6, 1962. The following year, several tests of models I and II were conducted at CELPA.

On August 27, 1964, the "Operation Inca" mission was carried out in the province of Mendoza (more precisely near the Puente del Inca). During the operation, a vehicle was propelled to an altitude of 35 km, and the payload was recovered by parachute. The model served to test the equipment that would later be part of the next project in Antarctica in 1965, including the launch tower and the polyethylene cover with heating that maintained the cabin at a temperature of 25 °C.

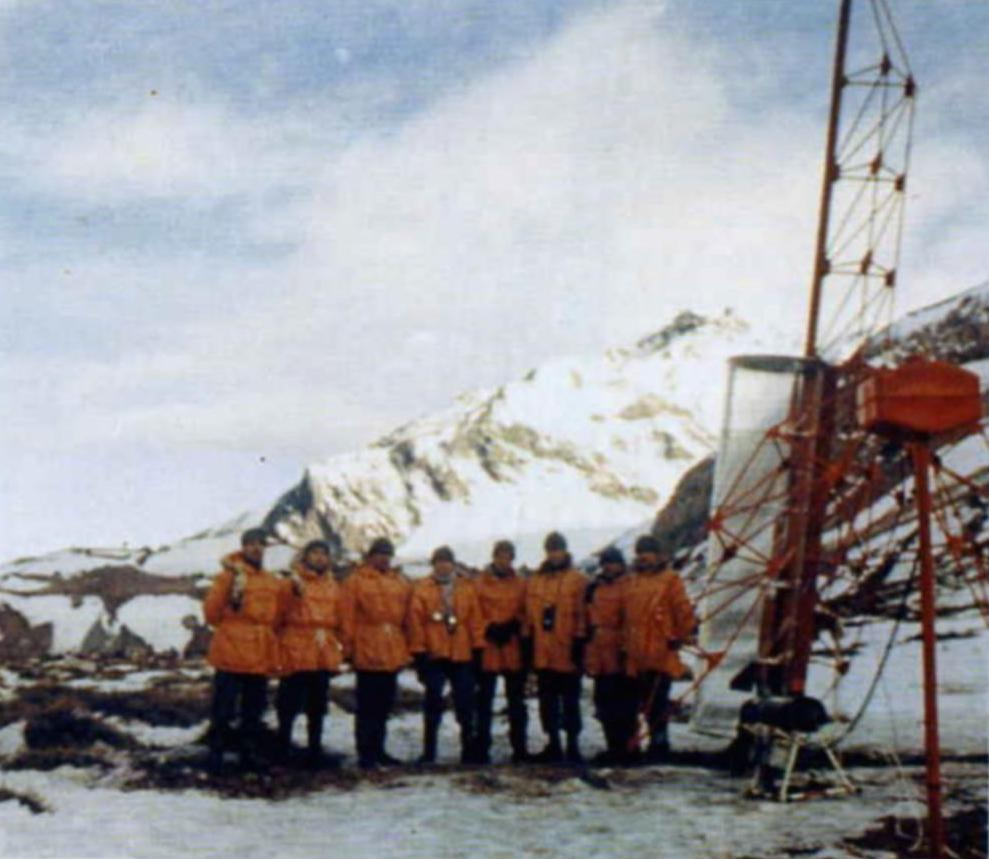
Gamma Centauro launch ramp in Antarctica (1964)

Gamma Centaur tests continued in February 1965 when, for the first time, two Gamma Centaur rockets were simultaneously launched from the CELPA Experimentation Center, and two others from the Matienzo Base in Antarctica. Two sounding balloons assembled by the National University of Tucumán were also tested, reaching an altitude of 24 km.

In this way, Argentina became the third country, after the Soviet Union and the United States, to undertake aerospace activities from Antarctica. The resulting experiences were used to analyze flight and study X-rays in the atmosphere. In August, four tests were carried out with Gamma Centauro rockets from the CELPA base, all successful.
