= COSMO-SkyMed =

Italian radar observation satellite system

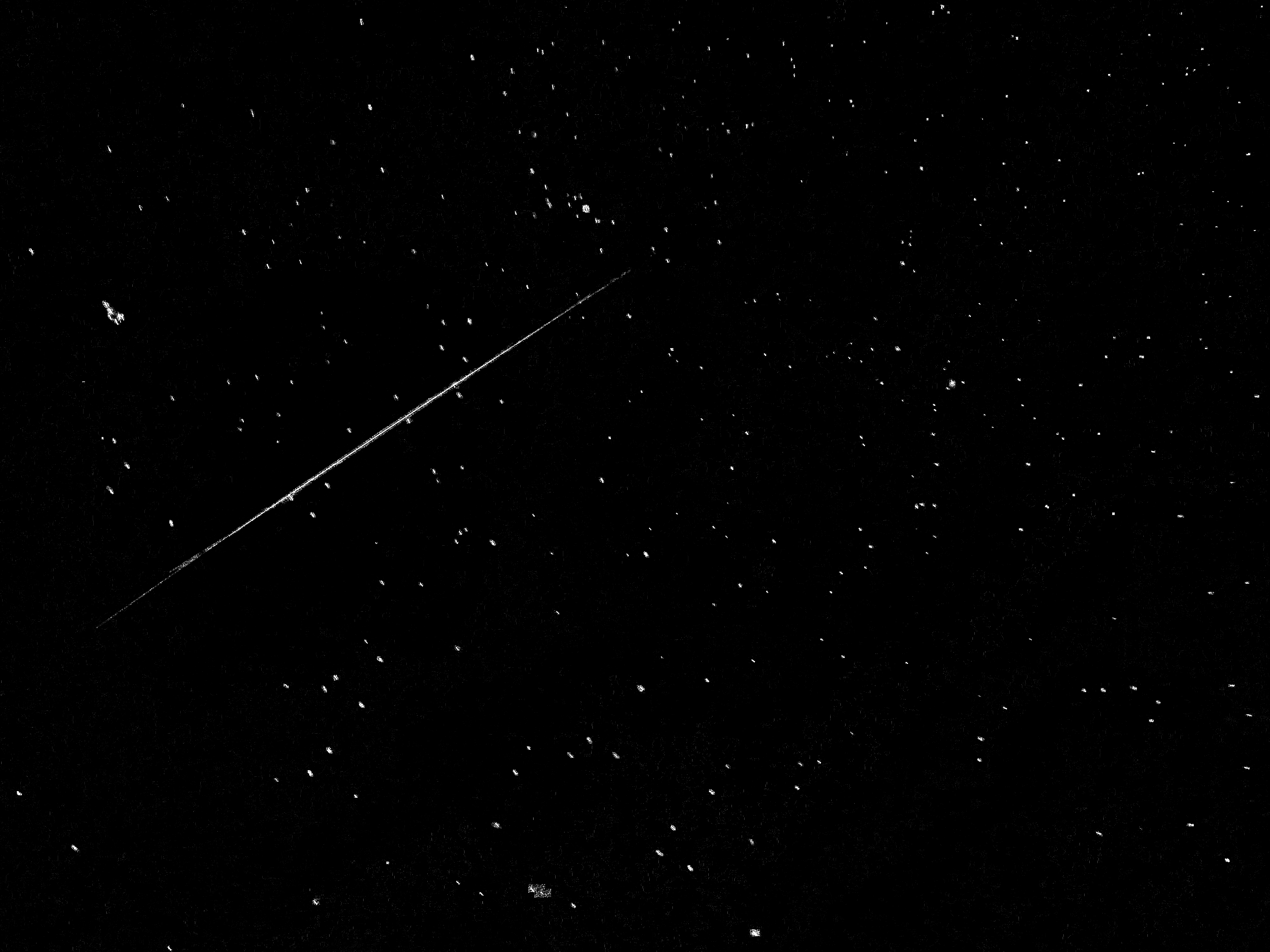
- A COSMO-SkyMed flare above the UK
- Manufacturer: Thales Alenia Space
- Country of origin: Italy
- Operator: ASI
- Applications: Earth observation radar
- Website: http://www.cosmo-skymed.it/it/index.htm

Specifications
- Bus: PRIMA
- Launch mass: 1,700 kg (3,700 lb)
- Power: 4 kW
- Regime: Sun-synchronous orbit
- Design life: 5 years (planned)

Production
- Status: Operational
- On order: 4
- Built: 4
- Launched: 4
- Operational: 4
- Maiden launch: COSMO-1; 23 June 2007, 02:34:00 UTC
- Last launch: COSMO-4; 5 November 2010, 02:20:03 UTC

COSMO-SkyMed (COnstellation of small Satellites for the Mediterranean basin Observation) is an Earth-observation satellite space-based radar system funded by the Italian Ministry of Research and Ministry of Defence and conducted by the Italian Space Agency (ASI), intended for both military and civilian use. The prime contractor for the spacecraft was Thales Alenia Space. COSMO SkyMed is a constellation of four dual use Intelligence, surveillance, target acquisition, and reconnaissance (ISR) Earth observation satellites with a synthetic-aperture radar (SAR) as main payload, the result of the intuition of Giorgio Perrotta in the early nineties. The synthetic-aperture radar was developed starting in the late nineties with the SAR 2000 program funded by ASI.

The space segment of the system includes four identical medium-sized 1,700 kg (3,700 lb) satellites called COSMO-SkyMed (or COSMO) 1, 2, 3, 4, equipped with synthetic-aperture radar (SAR) sensors with global coverage of the planet. Observations of an area of interest can be repeated several times a day in all-weather conditions. The imagery is applied to defense and security assurance in Italy and other countries, seismic hazard analysis, environmental disaster monitoring, and agricultural mapping.

== COSMO-SkyMed first generation ==
The four satellites are in Sun-synchronous polar orbits with a 97.90° inclination at a nominal altitude of 619 km (385 mi) and an orbital period of 97.20 minutes. The local time ascending node at the equator is 06:00. The operating life of each satellite is estimated to be 5 years. Each satellite repeats the same ground track every 16 days. They cross the equator at approximately 06:00 and 18:00 local-time each day and can image any point twice each day. The satellites are phased in the same orbital plane, with COSMO-SkyMed's 1, 3, and 2 at 90° intervals followed by COSMO-SkyMed 4 at 67.5° after COSMO-SkyMed 2. The offset of satellite 4 allows a one-day interferometry mode for elevation information. The Sun-synchronous orbit (SSO) is used due to power (Electrical Power Subsystem) and revisit time requirements.

The satellites' main components are:

- Two solar arrays for 3.8 kW at 42 V DC
- Stabilization, navigation and Global Positioning System (GPS) systems
- Synthetic-aperture radar (SAR) working in X-band
- 300 Gbit on-board memory and 310 Mbit/s data-link with ground segments

The radar antenna is a phased array that is 1.4 × 5.7 m (4 ft 7 in × 18 ft 8 in). The system is capable of both single- and dual-polarization collection. The center frequency is 9.6 GHz with a maximum radar bandwidth of 400 MHz.

=== List of launches ===
United Launch Alliance provided launch services for the satellites with their Delta II 7420-10C launch vehicles from Vandenberg Air Force Base. Satellite processing for the first two satellites was handled by the Astrotech Space Operations subsidiary of SPACEHAB. The first satellite COSMO-1 (COSPAR 2007-023A) was launched at 02:34:00 UTC on 8 June 2007. COSMO-2 (COSPAR 2007-059A) was launched at 02:31:42 UTC on 9 December 2007, the launch having been delayed from 6 December 2007 due to bad weather, and problems with the rocket's cork insulation. COSMO-3 (COSPAR 2008-054A) launched at 02:28 UTC on 25 October 2008. COSMO-4 (COSPAR 2010-060A) launched on 6 November 2010, at 02:20 UTC.

Flight No.	Date/Time (UTC)	Launch site	Launch vehicle	Payload	Outcome
1	8 June 2007, 02:34:00	VAFB, SLC-2W	Delta II 7420-10	COSMO-1	Success
2	9 December 2007, 02:31:42	VAFB, SLC-2W	Delta II 7420-10	COSMO-2	Success
3	25 October 2008, 02:28:25	VAFB, SLC-2W	Delta II 7420-10C	COSMO-3	Success
4	6 November 2010, 02:20:03	VAFB, SLC-2W	Delta II 7420-10C	COSMO-4	Success

== COSMO-SkyMed second generation (CSG) ==
COSMO-SkyMed Second Generation
- Manufacturer: Thales Alenia Space
- Country of origin: Italy
- Operator: ASI
- Applications: Earth observation radar
- Website: http://www.cosmo-skymed.it/it/index.htm

Specifications
- Bus: PRIMA
- Launch mass: 2,205 kg (4,861 lb)
- Power: 5 kW
- Regime: Sun-synchronous orbit
- Design life: 7 years (planned)

Production
- Status: Operational
- On order: 4
- Built: 3
- Launched: 3
- Operational: 2
- Maiden launch: CSG-1; 18 December 2019, 08:54 UTC

To replace the first COSMO-SkyMed constellation, the Italian Space Agency is developing the COSMO-SkyMed second generation constellation. The 2nd generation constellation has the same function of radar-based Earth observation with particular focus on the Mediterranean area as the 1st generation.

Like the 1st generation, the 2nd generation also consists of 4 satellites, CSG-1, CSG-2, CSG-3 and CSG-4. The satellites are improved versions of the first generation satellites. Also the radar payload CSG-SAR (COSMO-SkyMed Second Generation Synthetic Aperture Radar) is an improved version of the first generation X-band SAR payload. Furthermore, the 2nd generation satellites will operate in the same orbit (indeed, in the same orbital plane) as the first generation satellites. The 2nd generation satellites slightly outweigh the first generation satellites at 2,205 kg (4,861 lb) of mass.

The contract for building two satellites was signed in September 2015. In December 2020, another two satellites were ordered. The satellites are built by Thales Alenia Space (the successor company of Alenia Spazio). They have a planned lifetime of 7 years.

=== List of launches ===
CSG-1 was launched on 18 December 2019 by Soyuz ST-A from Centre spatial Guyanais (CSG). CSG-2 was launched on 31 January 2022 by Falcon 9 Block 5 from Space Launch Complex 40 at Cape Canaveral Space Force Station. CSG-3 was launched in January 2026 on a Falcon 9 Block 5 launch vehicle.

Flight No.	Date/Time (UTC)	COSPAR ID	Launch site	Launch vehicle	Payload	Outcome	Notes
1	18 December 2019, 08:54:20	2019-092A	Kourou, ELS	Soyuz ST-A / Fregat-MT	CSG-1	Success	On 18 January 2021, COSMO-SkyMed Second Generation-1 (CSG-1) became operational with the first of four satellites.
2	31 January 2022, 23:11:14	2022-008A	CCSFS, SLC-40	Falcon 9 Block 5 ♺ B1052.3	CSG-2	Success	On 31 January 2022, SpaceX launched COSMO-SkyMed Second Generation FM2 mission to low Earth orbit from Space Launch Complex 40 (SLC-40) at Cape Canaveral Space Force Station in Florida.
3	3 January 2026, 02:09:16	2026-001A	Vandenberg, SLC‑4E	Falcon 9 Block 5	CSG-3	Success	First orbital launch of 2026
4	2027 ?		Kourou, ELV	Vega-C	CSG-4	Planned	

== Ground segment ==
The ground segment of the system is composed of:

- Command Center:
  - Italian Centro Controllo e Pianificazione Missione del Fucino
- Tracking and data stations:
  - Argentine Cordoba Station
  - Sweden Kiruna Station
- User Ground Segments:
  - Italian Matera Civil User Ground Segment
  - Italian Pratica di Mare Defence User Ground Segment
  - France Defence User Ground Segment

The governments of Argentina and France are involved respectively in the civil and military segments of the system.

== SAR capabilities ==
The COSMO-SkyMed satellites have three basic types of imaging modes:

- Spotlight, a high-resolution mode collected over a small area by steering the radar beam slightly fore-to-aft during the collection period
- Stripmap, a medium-resolution mode collected over long, continuous swaths in which the beam is pointed broadside to the satellite track
- ScanSAR, a low-resolution mode that creates extra-wide swaths by collecting short segments at different ranges and then mosaicking them together

There are two Spotlight modes:

- SPOTLIGHT1, which is a military-only mode, and
- SPOTLIGHT2, which provides a resolution of 1 m (3 ft 3 in) over a 10 × 10 km (6.2 × 6.2 mi) area. Spotlight polarization is limited to either HH or VV

There are two Stripmap modes:

- HIMAGE, which provides a resolution of between 3 and 5 m (9.8 and 16.4 ft) over a swath of 40 km (25 mi), and
- PINGPONG, which collects dual-polarization data at 15 m (49 ft) resolution over a swath of 30 km (19 mi). The dual-polarization data can consist of any two polarizations (HH, VV, VH, HV), and it is non-coherent, as it is collected in "pulse groups" that alternate from one polarization to the other.

There are two ScanSAR modes:

- WIDEREGION, which provides 30 m (98 ft) resolution data over a swath of 100 km (62 mi), and
- HUGEREGION, which provides 100 m (330 ft) resolution data over a swath of 200 km (120 mi).

The system is sized to collect up to 450 images per satellite per day.

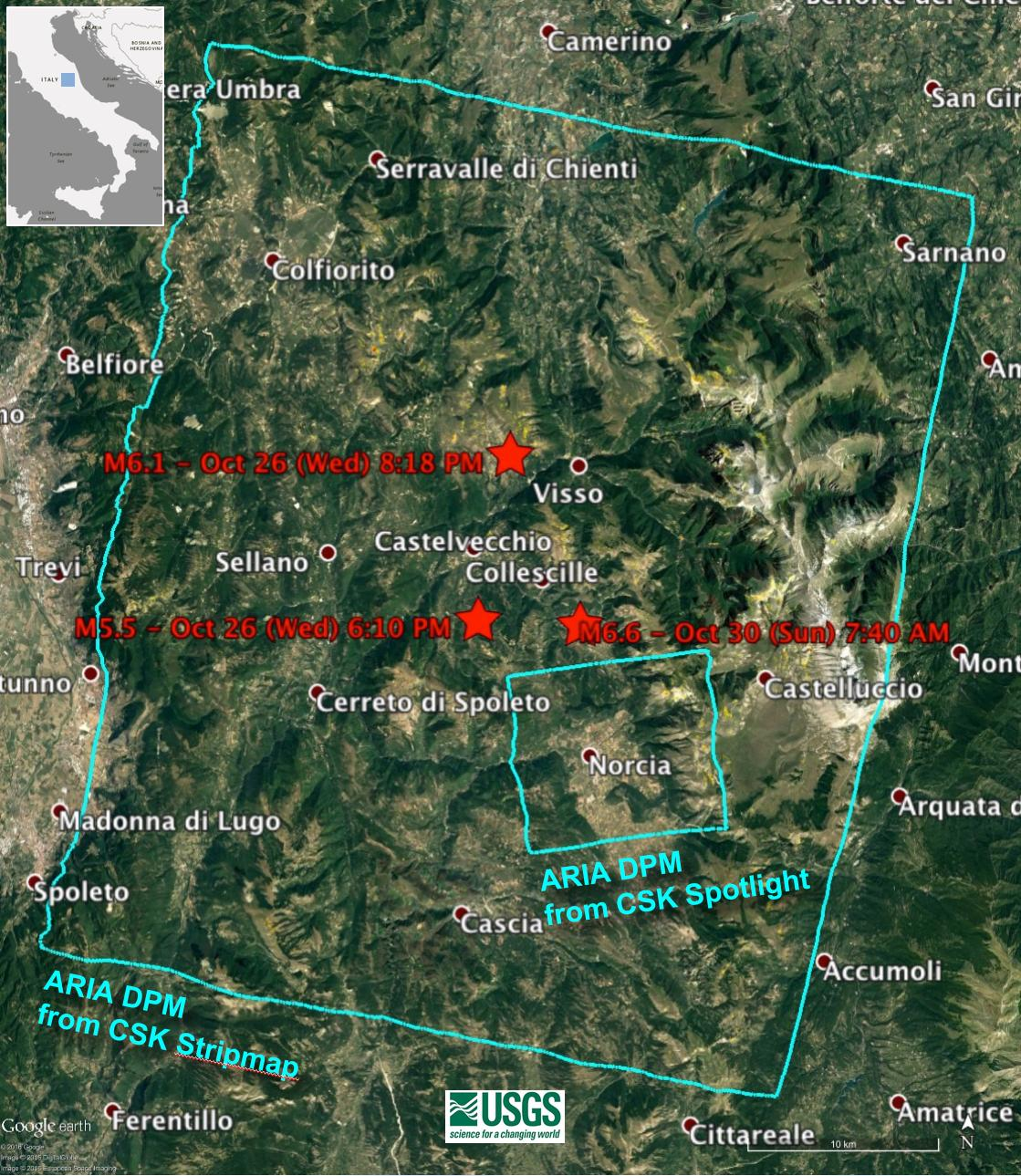
Overview of Damage Proxy Map from COSMO-SkyMed data

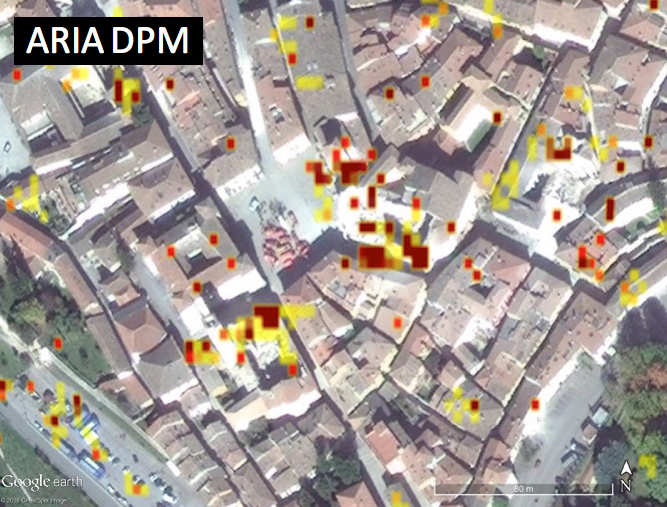
Detail of the Damage Proxy Map of Norcia, Italy

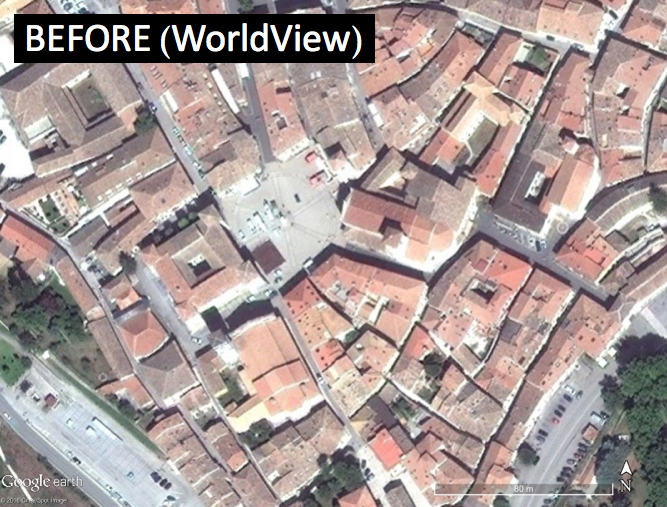
View of Norcia before October 2016 Central Italy earthquakes

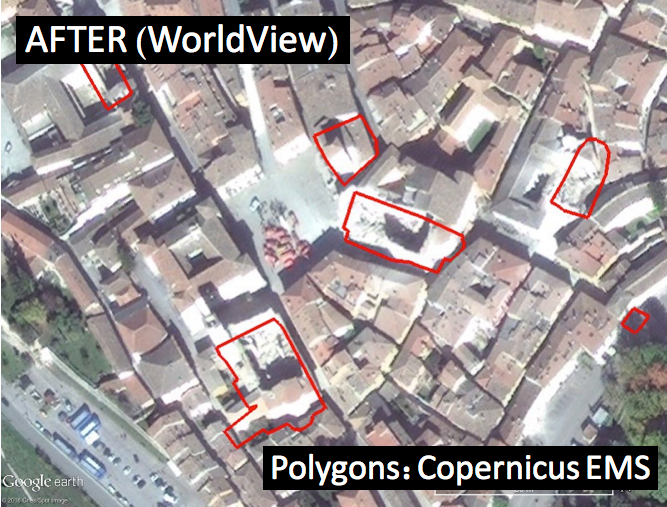
View of Norcia after October 2016 Central Italy earthquakes

== Commercialization ==
e-GEOS, S.p.A., a joint venture between European spaceflight services company Telespazio (80%) and the Italian Space Agency (ASI) (20%), has the exclusive worldwide commercial rights to sell COSMO-SkyMed data and products.

== Flares ==
The COSMO-SkyMed satellites are lesser-known deliverers of satellite flares, sometimes approaching magnitude −3. Flares come mainly from SAR-panels of the satellites. Although overshadowed by the Iridium satellites, the flares are often long-lasting, with the satellites traversing much of the sky at brighter-than-average magnitudes.

== See also ==
- Paz, Spain's SAR satellite.
- SAOCOM, two Argentine SAR-satellites that are part of the SIASGE constellation alongside COSMO-SkyMed.
- SAR Lupe, a system of five military SAR-satellites of Germany.
