= Teófilo Tabanera =

Argentine engineer (1909–1981)

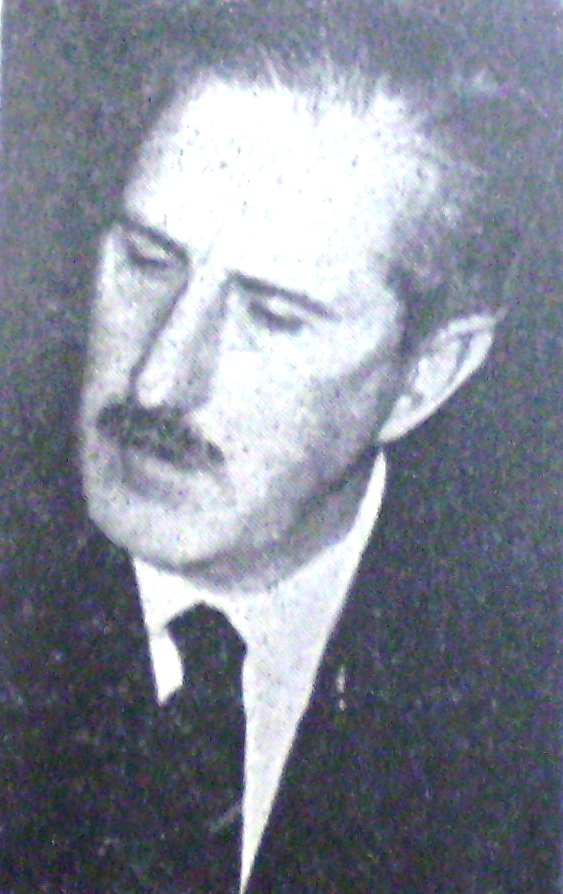
Teófilo Tabanera

Teófilo Tabanera (1909–1981) was an Argentine engineer and air force officer and an instrumental figure in space exploration.

== Biography ==
Born in 1909 in the province of Mendoza, Tabanera moved to the capital of the province of Buenos Aires to study at the National University of La Plata, where he graduated in 1936. He went on study trips to the United States and Europe. He was a member of the British Interplanetary Society and the American Society of Rockets. He began working as a draftsman for Ferrocarriles Argentinos and YPF.

His interest in aerospace activity led him to found the Association Interplanetary Argentina in 1948 (which later was renamed Space Sciences Association of Argentina) where he dedicated himself to promoting the Argentine space program. He was present at the First International Astronautical Congress, held at the Sorbonne University in Paris. He was vice president of the International Astronautical Federation (IAF), for five consecutive terms, and president of the CNIE, founded in 1960 by a decree of the government of Arturo Frondizi (1958-1962). He was a member of the British Interplanetary Society and the American Society of Rockets. He was the only person in all of Latin America to author a weekly publication dedicated to space issues. This publication lasted for ten years.
