= VLS-1 V03 =

Brazilian space launch disaster

Coordinates: 2°22′23″S 44°23′47″W

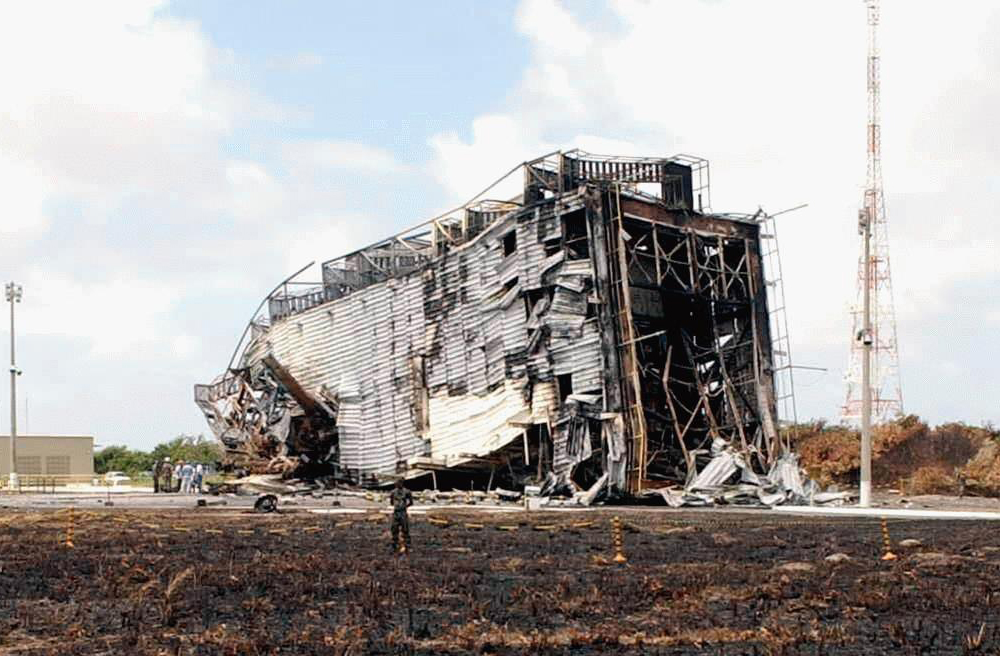
- Wreck of the structure of the VLS launch pad
- Date: 22 August 2003; 23 years ago
- Time: 13:26:06 BRT (UTC-3)
- Duration: 0:08:45
- Location: Alcântara Launch Center, Maranhão, Brazil
- Outcome: Setback to the Brazilian space program with the death of 21 technicians and destruction of launch vehicle and structure (launch pad and launch tower)
- Deaths: 21

VLS-1 V03
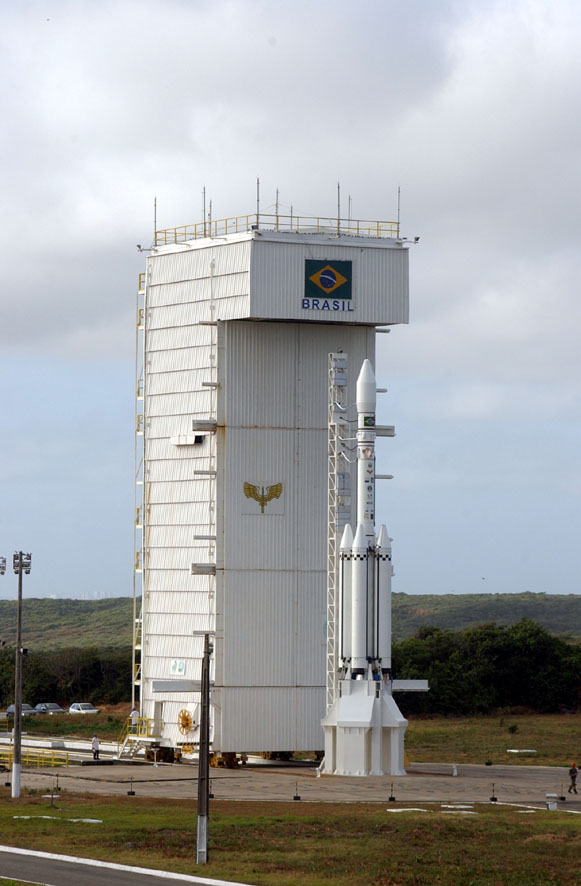
- The VLS-1 involved

Start of mission
- Launch date: August 25, 2003 (Planned)
- Rocket: VLS-1

End of mission
- Destroyed: August 22, 2003 (destroyed before launch)

The 2003 Alcântara VLS accident was an accident during the Brazilian Space Agency's third attempt to launch the VLS-1 rocket, which was intended to launch two satellites into orbit. The rocket ignited on its launch pad at the Alcântara Launch Center, killing 21 people. It is officially the fourth deadliest space exploration related disaster in history.

== Background ==
The rocket, proposed in 1979 had two launch attempts until the accident: one in 1997, which ended up in the Atlantic Ocean due to the failure of one of the first stage engines to start and another in 1999, destroyed remotely due to a flame penetrating the top of the second stage block after takeoff.

In 2000, according to Manchete magazine, the ECHELON surveillance system allegedly engaged in industrial espionage against VLS systems. The following year, when the launch was still scheduled for 2002, the Ministry of Science tripled the program's funding and the CTA conducted successful tests of the VLS engines.

In August 2002, the Official Gazette of the Union published the contract awarded to Villares Metals S/A for "heat treatment services on the engine casing" of the VLS-1 V03 for R$ 757,812.00 (U$ 246244.72). The following month, when the final electrical and electronic system tests were being conducted in São José dos Campos, the launch was expected to take place in the first half of December, but in November 2002, the third launch had been postponed from December 2002 to March 2003.

In February 2003, Abril Service Ltda. was contracted to machine the engine housings. In April, the Minister of Science Roberto Amaral appointed Luiz Bevilacqua as president of the AEB, and in a speech he stated that the government would seek to consolidate the Alcântara Launch Center and complete the VLS project during the four years of the Lula administration. In an interview with Valor Econômico that same month, Bevilacqua indicated that the launch would take place within the next two months. On April 16, the Air Force ordered the IAE and CTA teams to return to São José dos Campos, suspending the operation until July 1, when activities resumed without verifying the integrity of the VLS components. In May, the AEB and the Aerospace Technical Center announced that the launch would take place in August 2003. It was then set for August 25, 2003.

== Operation São Luís ==
Satellite SATEC

Satellite UNOSAT

Besides being the third flight of the VLS-1, the operation, which began on July 1, 2003, and was scheduled to last 60 days, had as objectives the launch of the satellites UNOSAT and SATEC in to orbit; verify the CLA's ability to perform type launches and the use of the CLBI as a tracking station. The Satec, valued at R$ 500,000, used spare parts from other programs, had a service life of six months, weighed 65 kg, was 66 cm wide and deep, and 61 cm tall; developed by INPE, its objective was to test the technological equipment on board the rocket; Unosat, developed by the University of Northern Paraná with support from AEB, among others, was intended to be Brazil's first nanosatellite. V03 aimed to place them in a circular orbit at 15° and 750 km. The VLS-1 was valued at U$ 7 million.

Between July and August, the Alcântara Center experienced several power outages, which, among other occasions, occurred during the transport of the rocket boosters. Other problems were found in the electrical grid connecting the Advanced Control Center and the Launch Tower, with cables submerged in mud or damaged by water.

The transportation of materials for V03 started on August 23, 2002 and stopped on April 16, 2003. The operation was restarted on July 1, an inspection the next day found no problems, and the satellites were transported on the 30th. The inertial platform, which is responsible for controlling the rocket, was transported in a private car without any indication that it was fragile equipment; it had exhibited “intermittent problems” leading up to the accident. The mounting base for this equipment was reportedly damaged due to improper handling. Tribuna da Imprensa reports that the launch was delayed three times, including in April and May, due to, among other problems, flaws in the protection of the rocket "cluster." After several assembly operations, the accident occurred on August 22, 2003.

On August 17, two launch simulations took place, which led to the launch being scheduled for the 25th. Colonel Serre reports that there was no pressure to rush the launch and disregard safety regulations, a view expressed by the then-Minister of Defense, José Viegas, after the accident. However, a report by Agência Brasil on August 20 states that the date of the 25th was not yet 100% confirmed. During the first simulated countdown, a power outage struck the launch site; during the second, “abnormal line-of-fire measurements” were detected, which were not explained. A few days before the accident, an Air Force intelligence team was sent to the Alcântara Space Base to investigate possible disruptions to the launch plan. One of the tests conducted involved measuring radio waves in the days leading up to the launch, and nothing suspicious was detected in the region. The final phase of testing involved about 700 people at the Launch Center. The operation's leadership was kept informed of activities at the base through reports prepared at the start of each day, but, according to Folha de São Paulo, no attempt was made to monitor events in real time or to coordinate their execution appropriately.

== Accident ==
The accident occurred three days before the scheduled launch date, at 1:26:06 pm (Brasília time) on August 22, 2003, between frames 26 and 27 recorded by the Closed Circuit TV of the Mobile Integration Tower, with professionals spread across the five floors of the tower. At the time of the accident, the rocket weighed 50 metric tons, 90% of which was solid fuel, ammonium perchlorate.

An unplanned ignition, which began in a first-stage engine that caught fire after ignition, destroyed the launch vehicle while it was on the CLA launch pad. The other three engines, each containing more than 7,000 kilograms of solid propellant, did not fire. 21 people died due to the ignition of a first stage engine. It took about eight seconds before the tower was enveloped by smoke and gases heated up to 3,000 °C. The mobile tower stood upright for five minutes, collapsing at 1:31.

Survivors reported the noise of at least one booster running and several loud bangs. Amauri dos Santos Conceição, a safety technician at the base, reports in his diary that he waited for the authorities to remove two visible bodies, and then stayed behind to try to extinguish the remaining fires and search for other survivors. He finished his duties at the control tower at 7:55 p.m. (BRT).

Due to the scale of the event, the dead were identified through a roll call and the remains were identified and sent to the IML on August 23, 2003. On the same day, the base was reopened to the press. An Estadão podcast reports that there was no checklist indicating who had entered the base and who was working on the rocket at the time of the accident. It took two days to locate the 21 victims: on the first day, 2 were recovered; on the second, 7; and on the third, 12 victims. In the first few days after the accident, the victims were listed as "missing." The remains were identified using personal belongings, dental records, and DNA testing.

At the same time that the accident occurred, the president of AEB Luiz Bevilacqua, was giving a press conference about the agreement signed between Brazil and Ukraine for the use of the Alcântara base. Being informed of the accident by journalists, he ironically replied "only if it's a June Festivals firework". A few minutes later, an aide confirmed the incident with a note. At 3:15 p.m., the Space Agency published the Air Force's official statement. It was identified that the ignition process occurred prematurely, and thus the launch tower was not removed in time, which was the main cause of the fire.

None of the activities, involving final adjustments to the equipment and the installation of video cameras, carried out that day posed any risk. However, the number of people at the base was well above safety standards, which allowed for only six people to be present. The accident significantly delayed the Brazilian space program. It was later revealed that, contrary to the regulations, on the morning of the 22nd, the ignition system was installed in only two engines, even though the schedule indicated that this should have been done on the 23rd; in addition, other technicians were testing the electrical system, a task that should have been completed the previous week. According to the Air Force, there was no damage outside the launch area, and at first, Minister José Viegas confirmed 16 fatalities.

== Aftermath ==
As an immediate response, President Lula called an emergency meeting at the Palácio do Planalto with Defense Minister José Viegas and decided that Viegas and Roberto Amaral, Minister of Science, would travel to Alcântara the following day. André Singer, spokesman of the Presidency, was the first to speak on behalf of the executive branch. Also on the 23rd, Russian President Vladimir Putin sent a telegram to the Brazilian president expressing his condolences, and on the same day, the Air Force released the list of fatalities. Lula did not travel with his ministers because he was scheduled to attend the funeral of diplomat Sérgio Vieira de Mello. Three days later, during an international trip to Peru, President Lula spoke about the accident involving the journalists, after Peruvian President Alejandro Toledo opened the press conference by asking for a minute of silence for the victims. That same day, Ministers Viegas and Amaral, along with AEB President Bevilacqua, visited the CLA, where they paid their respects.

President Lula and Minister Viegas rejected the idea that the accident had occurred due to a lack of funding, while Brigadier General Hugo de Oliveira Piva, the architect of the VLS program, pointed to the program's financial constraints dating back to the Sarney administration, which has since seen the program's budget drop from $521 million to $285 million during the Fernando Henrique Cardoso administration, as the main cause of the accident, while also acknowledging the possibility of human error.

=== Investigation ===
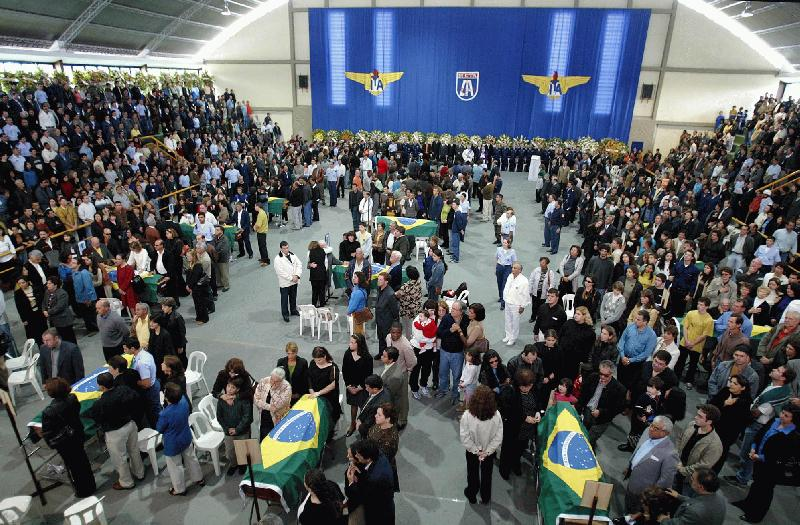
Funeral service, with military honors, for 19 victims, held on August 27, 2003

The funeral service for the 19 victims, held with full military honors on August 27, 2003, at the DCTA—with the last two being identified that same afternoon—was attended by the Governor of São Paulo, Geraldo Alckmin, President Luis Inácio Lula da Silva. Ministers José Viegas (Defense) and Roberto Amaral (Science and Technology), Senate President José Sarney, the government leader in the Senate, Aloizio Mercadante, and the president of the Space Agency, Luiz Bevilacqua. In total, about 1,500 people attended the funeral. The next day, the funeral for the last two victims took place.

The Military Police Inquiry was opened on August 26, 2003, and the Technical Investigation Commission was appointed on August 28, 2003. The investigation involved Russia at the request of the Ministry of Defense, in particular Brigadier Luiz Carlos Bueno, during his visit to Moscow as part of the Brazilian Air Force F X Program, when he requested three technicians and was responded to with the dispatch of six six technicians from the Russian Aerospace Agency. The Military Police Inquiry was led by Air Force Brigadier José Monteiro Guimarães and assisted by the Deputy Attorneys General of the Military Justice System, Péricles Aurélio Lima de Queiroz and Carlos Frederico de Oliveira Pereira. Carlos Frederico de Oliveira Pereira was replaced by Military Prosecutor Clementino Augusto Ruffeil Rodrigues in September 2003. Péricles Aurélio was later replaced by Deputy Attorney General Arilma Cunha da Silva.

The families of the victims have even called for an independent investigation, something that the then president Lula has not commented on, but he has announced that he would send a bill of R$ 100 thousand to compensate the victims' families, approved by the Chamber of Deputies in October of that same year, in addition to paying for scholarships for their children. In the end, the investigation was not independent, as it was led by Brigadier Marco Antônio Couto do Nascimento, deputy director of the CTA, including representatives from the Brazilian Society for the Advancement of Science. A Special Commission of the House of Representatives visited the base on October 20. The compensation was approved by the House on October 28, 2003. Despite evidence of French espionage in Maranhão, no evidence of sabotage was found. Allegations of sabotage made within the Air Force and by members of Congress went so far as to concern the Air Force Command, which believed this would bring the project into disrepute, despite acknowledging the presence of foreigners and spies in the area at the time of the accident.

In testimony before the Chamber of Deputies in September 2003, Ministers José Viegas Filho and Roberto Amaral announced that discussions regarding U.S. use of the Alcântara base had resumed, and they ruled out the possibility of electrical problems at the VLS. That same month, the Senate pledged its support for the continuation of the space program, and the president of the Brazilian Space Agency issued a letter to the agency's employees addressing the accident, on the same day that the ministers of Defense and Science announced the names of those who would serve on the investigative committee, and President Luiz Inácio Lula da Silva reaffirmed in a speech his intention to test the fourth prototype over the next three years.

Thirty-two days after the accident, Air Force Brigadier General Thiago Ribeiro, technical director of the CTA, announced that the ignition of Booster A was in fact caused by an electrical current inside the rocket, which was either sudden—measuring 1.2 amps—or weak and lasting five minutes. In October, a Brazil-Russia partnership was announced to develop a liquid-fueled VLS using Russian technology; under agreements with Ukraine, the project would also receive a transfer of Ukrainian technology.

The report was presented by the ministers of Defense and Science on 16 March 2004. The conclusion of both the Brazilian and Russian investigators was that the cause of the accident was due to the unplanned start of the A-booster. Among the possible causes of the ignition, they raised the possibility of static electricity, with the Russian experts noting the absence of a bridge between the propellant and the propellant housing, but it was considered a low probability event due to the non-occurrence of lightning on the day. The electrostatic discharge hypothesis was found to be superior, due to the absence of a barrier between the first stage boosters. Overall, the report did not identify any "active failure" (error or violation) that caused the accident. However, it cited limited funding and a shortage of staff as contributing factors to the incident. In April 2004, the Space Agency even suggested that it would be better to cancel the program than to continue without funding. Minister José Viegas acknowledged that underfunding had left the program in a "virtual state of hibernation for a dangerously long period."

Following the report's publication, a new public tender was launched at the CTA, and in June, the Brazilian government requested an additional R$ 37 million for the space program's budget. That year, the government had promised R$ 100 million for the VLS program, even though the AEB estimated that three times that amount would be needed. In August 2004, Minister Eduardo Campos revealed that 46% of the fourth VLS was already complete.

An Estadão podcast indicates that the "mechanical safety device"—a lock that prevents ignition—was removed after an ignition failure in one of the engines of the VLS-1 V01, and will not be included in the next two versions; instead, it will be replaced by a relay box, or an "electronic device," which has been successfully tested on sounding rockets. The Investigation Commission did not consider the absence of the DMS to be the cause of the accident, but noted that the component would have prevented the fire, recommending that it be added back to future projects. The installation of detonators hours before the accident—two days earlier than scheduled (the installation schedule, in turn, indicates that they should have been installed on August 23)—by decision of the technical team was also considered a relevant factor in the incident. The investigations found no evidence of culpability or a military crime, and concluded that the most likely cause was an "electrostatic discharge" in the detonator.

The report on the accident by the Chamber of Deputies' External Commission recommended that the Brazilian Space Agency once again be placed under the authority of the Office of the President. In September 2004, the Military Prosecutor's Office even requested a new forensic investigation into the accident, and a call for bids was issued for the reconstruction of the base. Finally, the bidding process had been under legal review since late 2005; it was subsequently suspended by the Federal Court of Accounts in 2007, and the budget for a new attempt was slow to be approved. Issues such as the safety of solid propellant had not yet been resolved in 2006, according to Petrônio Noronha de Souza, president of the Brazilian Aerospace Association. In October 2006, it was announced that the family of one of the victims had filed a claim for damages and interest of up to R$ 5 million, which was upheld by the 1st Federal Court of São José dos Campos.

In 2008, the VLS project had been resumed, with the expectation of testing various aspects of the VLS-1B by 2012. As of August 22, 2008, of the R$62 million authorized for the Space Program—of which R$20.1 million was earmarked for Alcântara—not a single cent had been invested. Carlos Ganem, then president of the AEB, believed that one of the reasons was the lack of an aerospace market that would justify the investment. In tests conducted in October 2008 at the Coronel Abner power plant in São José dos Campos, the engine's flames reached 2,800°C.

== Results ==
The integration tower, which cost R$6.5 million in 1995, cost about R$10 million to rebuild. The launch tower was completed and delivered in 2012, but in 2013 the base had not yet finished its reconstruction. A mock-up of the VLS-1 was tested on the tower in 2012; In 2015, there were expectations that a partial test of the VLS would take place in 2016, with the AEB acknowledging the possibility that the program might be scrapped due to a lack of funding—a claim disputed by the Brazilian Air Force. But in 2016 it was decided to end the VLS program in favor of the VLM. The VLS-1 V04, with German participation, even had 70% of its structure completed, with its launch first expected to happen in 2006; it was then expected to happen in 2012, but it was canceled with the end of the program.

== Victims ==
The accident killed 21 civilians who were working at the time of the fire.

- Amintas Rocha Brito, 47, engineer
- Antonio Sergio Cezarini, 47, engineer
- Carlos Alberto Pedrini, 45, engineer
- Cesar Augusto Costalonga Varejão, 49, engineer
- Daniel Faria Gonçalves, 20, mechanic
- Eliseu Reinaldo Vieira, 46, engineer
- Gil Cesar Baptista Marques, 44, cameraman
- Gines Ananias Garcia, 46, engineer
- Jonas Barbosa Filho, 37, technician
- José Aparecido Pinheiro, 39, technician
- José Eduardo de Almeida, 38, cameraman
- José Eduardo Pereira II, 43, technician
- José Pedro Claro da Silva, 51, engineer
- Luis Primon de Araújo, 45, engineer
- Mario Cesar de Freitas Levy, 43, engineer
- Massanobu Shimabukuro, 43, technician
- Mauricio Biella Valle, 42, engineer
- Roberto Tadashi Seguchi, 46, engineer
- Rodolfo Donizetti de Oliveira, 35, technician
- Sidney Aparecido de Moraes, 38, technician
- Walter Pereira Junior, 45, technician

== See also ==
- List of spaceflight-related accidents and incidents

== Bibliography ==
- Ricardo Bolanume Neto (3 November 1997). "Foguete brasileiro fracassa, é destruído e cai no mar" [Brazilian rocket fails, is destroyed, and crashes into the sea]. Folha de São Paulo (in Brazilian Portuguese). Archived from the original on 22 December 2020.
- "Países sem segredos" [Countries Without Secrets]. Manchete (in Brazilian Portuguese). Vol. 48, no. 2.517. 15 July 2000.
- "MCT triplica verba para foguete VLS" [Ministry of Science and Technology Triples Funding for VLS Rocket]. Jornal do Brasil (in Brazilian Portuguese). Vol. CXI, no. 31. 9 May 2001. p. 12.
- "DEPARTAMENTO DE PESQUISAS E DESENVOLVIMENTO" [RESEARCH AND DEVELOPMENT DEPARTMENT]. Diário Oficial da União (in Brazilian Portuguese). No. 165. 27 August 2002. p. 9. ISSN 1676-2355.
- "Terceiro teste do VLS-1 previsto para o final do ano" [Third VLS-1 test scheduled for the end of the year]. Agência Espacial Brasileira - Notícias (in Brazilian Portuguese). 26 September 2002. Archived from the original on 24 October 2003.
- "Motor do VLS-1 é testado no CTA" [VLS-1 Engine Tested at the Aeronautics Technical Center]. Jornal do Commercio (in Brazilian Portuguese). Vol. CLXXV, no. 11. 10 November 2001. p. 16.
- "Céu ou Inferno" [Heaven or Hell]. Jornal do Brasil (in Brazilian Portuguese). Vol. 112, no. 217. 11 November 2002. p. A-13.
- "Extratos de contratos" [Contract Excerpts]. Diário Oficial da União (in Brazilian Portuguese) (24): 6. 3 February 2003. ISSN 1677-7069.
- "Satélites desenvolvidos no Brasil" [Satellites developed in Brazil]. Monitor Campista (in Brazilian Portuguese). Vol. 170, no. 94. April 2003. p. A-5.
- "Amaral diz que governo vai consolidar base de Alcântara e concluir projeto VLS" [Amaral says the government will consolidate the Alcântara base and complete the VLS project]. Agência Espacial Brasileira - Notícias (in Brazilian Portuguese). 2 April 2003. Archived from the original on 27 October 2003.
- "SATEC e UNOSAT desenvolvidos no Brasil estarão no VLS" [SATEC and UNOSAT, developed in Brazil, will be launched aboard VLS]. Agência Espacial Brasileira - Notícias (in Brazilian Portuguese). 17 April 2003. Archived from the original on 27 October 2003.
- "Bevilacqua fala das prioridades e projetos da AEB" [Bevilacqua Discusses AEB's Priorities and Projects]. Agência Espacial Brasileira - Notícias (in Brazilian Portuguese). 17 April 2003. Archived from the original on 27 October 2003.
- "VLS-1 vai ser lançado neste ano" [VLS-1 will be launched this year]. Agência Espacial Brasileira - Notícias (in Brazilian Portuguese). 23 May 2003. Archived from the original on 27 October 2003.
- "VLS-1 tem lançamento simulado hoje" [VLS-1 is conducting a simulated launch today]. Agência Brasil (in Brazilian Portuguese). 20 August 2003.
- "Trabalhos da Operação VLS estão quase concluídos" [Work on Operation VLS is nearly complete]. Agência Espacial Brasileira - Notícias (in Brazilian Portuguese). 20 August 2003. Archived from the original on 1 November 2003.
- "Nota Oficial - Operação São Luis" [Official Statement - Operation São Luis]. Agência Espacial Brasileira - Notícias (in Brazilian Portuguese). 22 August 2003. Archived from the original on 24 October 2003.
- Zimmermann (22 August 2003). "Ignição de motor provocou explosão de foguete, diz ministro" [Engine ignition caused rocket explosion, says minister]. Folha Online (in Brazilian Portuguese). Archived from the original on 24 August 2003.
- Estado (22 August 2003). ""Só se for um foguete de São João"" [“Only if it's a June Festivals firework”]. Estadão (in Brazilian Portuguese). Archived from the original on 9 May 2021.
- Johnson, Lauren (22 August 2003). "Brazilian Rocket Explodes, 21 Dead". CBS News.
- "Ministro confirma 16 mortes na base de Alcântara (MA)" [Minister Confirms 16 Deaths at the Alcântara Base (MA)]. Folha Online (in Brazilian Portuguese). 22 August 2003.
- Cabrera, Adalid (23 August 2003). "Brazil rocket explodes on pad". Arizona Republic. p. 27. Archived from the original on 4 September 2020.
- Meneghini (23 August 2003). "Governo não está escondendo nada, afirma José Viegas" [“The government isn't hiding anything,” says José Viegas]. Associated Press (in Brazilian Portuguese). Archived from the original on 24 April 2022.
- Redação (23 August 2003). "Fracasso e morte" [Failure and death]. Correio Braziliense (in Brazilian Portuguese). No. 14.706.
- Fraga, Plínio (23 August 2003). "Criador do projeto aposta em falha humana como causa do acidente" [Project creator points to human error as the cause of the accident]. Folha de São Paulo (in Brazilian Portuguese).
- "President Vladimir Putin sent a telegram to Brazilian President Luiz Inacio Lula da Silva in which he expressed his condolences on the tragedy at the Alcantara Launch Centre causing human losses". Kremlin.ru. 23 August 2003. "Our country is especially aware of the pain of such losses, because through our own experience we know the price one has to pay for humankind's technological progress, including in space exploration."
- "Presidente da Agência Espacial foi surpreendido" [The head of the Space Agency was taken by surprise]. Jornal do Commercio (in Brazilian Portuguese). Vol. CLXXVI, no. 270. 23 August 2003. p. 11.
- "Tragédia na base de Alcântara" [Tragedy at the Alcântara Launch Base]. Jornal do Brasil (in Brazilian Portuguese). Vol. 113, no. 137 (2 ed.). 23 August 2003. p. A3.
- "Aeronáutica divulga nomes dos mortos em explosão em Alcântara" [Air Force Releases Names of Those Killed in the Alcântara Explosion]. Folha Online (in Brazilian Portuguese). 23 August 2003.
- Valente; Lessa (24 August 2003). "IML examina as 21 vítimas encontradas" [The Forensic Medical Institute is examining the 21 victims who were found]. Folha de São Paulo (in Brazilian Portuguese).
- "Lula contrariado com falta de informações" [Lula Frustrated by Lack of Information]. Correio Braziliense (in Brazilian Portuguese). No. 14.707. 24 August 2003. p. 15.
- Mendonça, Eliane; Cosso, Roberto (2003). "Vítimas terão honras militares em São José" [Victims Will Receive Military Honors in São José]. Folha (in Brazilian Portuguese). Archived from the original on 24 April 2022.
- "Encontrados corpos de 16 dos 21 mortos em Alcântara" [Bodies of 16 of the 21 people killed in Alcântara have been found]. Jornal do Commercio (in Brazilian Portuguese). Vol. CLXXVI, no. 271 (2 ed.). 24 August 2003. p. A-17b.
- "Ainda há risco de explosão na base" [There is still a risk of an explosion at the base]. A Tribuna (in Brazilian Portuguese). Vol. 110, no. 152. 24 August 2003. p. C.
- "Brigadeiro não descarta sabotagem" [Brigadier General Does Not Rule Out Sabotage]. Jornal do Brasil (in Brazilian Portuguese). Vol. 113, no. 138 (2 ed.). 24 August 2003. p. A-6.
- Bacoccina, Denize (25 August 2003). "Lula cita Nasa para explicar acidente de Alcântara" [Lula cites NASA to explain the Alcântara accident]. www.bbc.com (in Brazilian Portuguese).
- Souza, Gilberto de (25 August 2003). "Aeronáutica investiga falha na segurança" [Air Force Investigates Safety Breach]. Jornal do Brasil (in Brazilian Portuguese). Vol. 113, no. 139. p. A-3.
- "Autoridades do governo prestam homenagem às vítimas" [Government officials pay tribute to the victims]. Agência Espacial Brasileira - Notícias (in Brazilian Portuguese). 25 August 2003. Archived from the original on 1 November 2003.
- "Бразильская ракета взорвалась на старте" [A Brazilian rocket exploded on pad]. Kommersant (in Russian). 25 August 2003.
- Campbell, Ullisses (26 August 2003). "Acidente ainda sem explicação" [Accident as yet unexplained]. Correio Braziliense (in Brazilian Portuguese). No. 14.709. p. 16.
- "Sobrevivente diz que projeto tinha falhas" [Survivor says the project had flaws]. Tribuna da Imprensa (in Brazilian Portuguese). Vol. LIV, no. 16.373. 26 August 2003. p. 3.
- "Bevilacqua participa do velório das vítimas do VLS" [Bevilacqua Attends the Wake for the VLS Victims]. Agência Espacial Brasileira - Notícias (in Brazilian Portuguese). 27 August 2003. Archived from the original on 1 November 2003.
- "PORTARIA Nº- 247, DE 25 DE AGOSTO DE 2003" [ADMINISTRATIVE ORDINANCE No. 247, OF AUGUST 25, 2003]. Diário Oficial da União (in Brazilian Portuguese). No. 165. 27 August 2003. p. 25. ISSN 1677-7050.
- Nogueira, Salvador (28 August 2003). "Famílias querem ver investigação" [Families want to see an investigation]. Folha de São Paulo (in Brazilian Portuguese). Archived from the original on 23 June 2004.
- Cosso, Roberto (28 August 2003). "Lula fará projeto para pagar indenizações" [Lula Will Develop a Compensation Payment Bill]. Folha de São Paulo (in Brazilian Portuguese). Archived from the original on 24 April 2022.
- Nogueira, Salvador (28 August 2003). "Plataforma do foguete custará R$ 10 mi" [Rocket launch pad to cost R$10 million]. Folha de São Paulo (in Brazilian Portuguese). Archived from the original on 24 April 2022.
- Klingl, Erika (28 August 2003). "Governo promete VLS até 2006" [Government Promises VLS by 2006]. Correio Braziliense (in Brazilian Portuguese). No. 14.711. p. 24.
- "Investimentos caem desde Sarney" [Investments have been falling since Sarney]. Correio Braziliense (in Brazilian Portuguese). No. 14.711. 28 August 2003. p. 24.
- "Lula chora no enterro dos técnicos" [Lula cries at the technical staff's funeral]. Monitor Campista (in Brazilian Portuguese). Vol. 170, no. 196. 28 August 2003. p. 4.
- "Base voltará a lançar VLS em 30 meses" [Base Will Resume VLS Launches in 30 Months]. Jornal do Commercio (in Brazilian Portuguese). Vol. CLXXVI, no. 274. 28 August 2003. p. A-17.
- "Lula faz discurso emocionado em velório de vítimas em SP" [Lula Delivers an Emotional Speech at a Memorial Service for the Victims in São Paulo]. A Tribuna (in Brazilian Portuguese). Vol. 110, no. 156. 28 August 2003. p. C-2.
- Segatto, Cristiane; Pereira, Paula; Azevedo, Solange (29 August 2003). "Tragédia anunciada" [A tragedy in the making]. Época (in Brazilian Portuguese). Archived from the original on 28 September 2020.
- "Vítimas da base de Alcântara" [Victims of the Alcântara base]. O Fluminense (in Brazilian Portuguese). Vol. 126, no. 36.831. 29 August 2003. p. 8.
- "Indenização de R$ 100 mil" [Compensation of R$ 100,000]. Correio Braziliense (in Brazilian Portuguese). No. 14.713. 30 August 2003. p. 15.
- "Cada família receberá R$ 100 mil do governo" [Each family will receive 100,000 reais from the government]. Jornal do Commercio (in Brazilian Portuguese). Vol. CLXXVI, no. 276. 30 August 2003. p. A-12.
- "Cresce suspeita de sabotagem no VLS-1" [Suspicions of sabotage at VLS-1 are growing]. Correio Braziliense (in Brazilian Portuguese). No. 14.714. 31 August 2003. p. 15.
- Global (2 September 2003). "Ignition fault probed in Brazil blast". Flight Global (in Brazilian Portuguese). Archived from the original on 1 September 2020.
- "Russos que ajudarão a investigar o acidente com o VLS-1 chegam na sexta" [Russians who will help investigate the VLS-1 accident are arriving on Friday] (in Brazilian Portuguese). 3 September 2003. Archived from the original on 25 April 2022.
- "PORTARIAS DE 3 DE SETEMBRO DE 2003" [ADMINISTRATIVE ORDERS OF SEPTEMBER 3, 2003]. Diário Oficial da União (in Brazilian Portuguese) (171): 30. 4 September 2003. ISSN 1677-7050.
- Rezende, Pedro Paulo (5 September 2003). "Licitação discreta" [Discreet Bidding]. Correio Braziliense (in Brazilian Portuguese). No. 14.719. p. 14.
- "Senadores garantem apoio à continuidade do programa espacial" [Senators Pledge Support for the Continuation of the Space Program]. Agência Espacial Brasileira - Notícias (in Brazilian Portuguese). 5 September 2003. Archived from the original on 19 September 2003.
- Sallum, Samanta (7 September 2003). "Boataria preocupa oficiais" [Rumors worry officials]. Correio Braziliense (in Brazilian Portuguese). No. 14.721. p. 16.
- "Brasil e EUA voltam a negociar Alcântara" [Brazil and the U.S. Resume Negotiations on Alcântara]. Correio Braziliense (in Brazilian Portuguese). No. 14.724. 10 September 2003. p. 15.
- Bevilacqua, Luiz (10 September 2003). "Carta do Presidente da AEB aos funcionários" [Letter from the AEB President to Staff]. Agência Espacial Brasileira - Notícias (in Brazilian Portuguese). Archived from the original on 5 October 2003.
- "Ministros divulgam nomes de cientistas para comissão técnica" [Ministers Announce Names of Scientists for Technical Committee]. Agência Espacial Brasileira - Notícias (in Brazilian Portuguese). 10 September 2003. Archived from the original on 13 October 2003.
- "Lula reafirma compromisso com programa espacial" [Lula Reaffirms Commitment to Space Program]. Agência Espacial Brasileira - Notícias (in Brazilian Portuguese). 11 September 2003. Archived from the original on 13 October 2003.
- "Portarias de 10 de Setembro de 2003" [Administrative Orders of September 10, 2003]. Diário Oficial da União (in Brazilian Portuguese) (176): 34. 11 September 2003. ISSN 1677-7050.
- "Corrente elétrica acionou o VLS" [An electrical current triggered the VLS]. Correio Braziliense (in Brazilian Portuguese). No. 14.738. 24 September 2003. p. 14.
- "Rússia ajuda Alcântara" [Russia Helps Acantara]. Correio Braziliense (in Brazilian Portuguese). No. 14.755. 11 October 2003. p. 19.
- "Members of Congress Will Visit the Alcântara Launch Center". Agência Brasil (in Brazilian Portuguese). 20 October 2003. Archived from the original on 25 April 2022.
- Rezende, Pedro Paulo (22 October 2003). "Acordo para conquistar o espaço" [Agreement to Conquer Space]. Correio Braziliense (in Brazilian Portuguese). No. 14.766. p. 15.
- "Câmara aprova indenização para familiares de vítimas de Alcântara" [Chamber o Deputies Approves Compensation for Families of Alcântara Victims]. Agência Brasil (in Brazilian Portuguese). 29 October 2003. Archived from the original on 25 April 2022.
- "Foguete" [Rocket]. O Fluminense (in Brazilian Portuguese). Vol. 126, no. 36.883. 29 October 2003. p. 8.
- Today (2003). "Space Today Online - Brazilian space rockets - a troubled road to space". www.spacetoday.org. Archived from the original on 2 December 2003.
- "Ignição antes da hora causou explosão do VLS" [Premature ignition caused the VLS explosion]. Correio Braziliense (in Brazilian Portuguese). No. 14.866. 31 January 2004. p. 21.
- Berquó, Jolan Eduardo; Coelho, Elizabeth Cabral; Martinolli, João Bosco; Corrêa, Cleber Souza (February 2004). Relatório da Investigação do Acidente ocorrido com o VLS-1 VO3, em 22 de agosto de 2003, em Alcântara, Maranhão [Investigation Report on the Accident Involving the VLS-1 VO3, which Occurred on August 22, 2003, in Alcântara, Maranhão] (PDF) (in Brazilian Portuguese). São José dos Campos: Ministerio de Defesa Comando da Aeronautica. p. 118. Archived (PDF) from the original on 8 November 2013.
- Nogueira, Salvador (15 March 2004). "Descontrole gerencial provocou acidente com VLS, diz relatório" [Management Failure Caused the VLS Accident, Report Says]. Folha de S. Paulo (in Brazilian Portuguese).
- "Relatório de tragédia com o VLS" [Report on the VLS Tragedy]. Monitor Campista (in Brazilian Portuguese). Vol. 171, no. 61. 17 March 2004. p. 6.
- "Falta de investimentos é apontada como uma das falhas" [A lack of investment is cited as one of the problems]. Monitor Campista (in Brazilian Portuguese). Vol. 171, no. 61. 17 March 2004. p. 6.
- Lima, Sandro (17 March 2004). "Faltou dinheiro para segurança" [There wasn't enough money for security]. Correio Braziliense (in Brazilian Portuguese). No. 14.913. p. 16.
- "Brazil's flawed space bid exposed". BBC News. 27 March 2004.
- "Mais de 9 mil vagas" [More than 9,000 job openings]. Correio Braziliense (in Brazilian Portuguese). No. 14.921. 25 March 2004. p. 12.
- "Acidente com o VLS" [Accident with the VLS]. Revista Marítima Brazileira (in Brazilian Portuguese). Vol. 124, no. 04/06. 2004. pp. 302–303.
- "Agência Espacial sugere fim do programa por falta de verba" [Space Agency Suggests Ending the Program Due to Lack of Funding]. Tribuna da Imprensa (in Brazilian Portuguese). Vol. VL, no. 16.558. 2 April 2004. p. 7.
- "Eduardo Campos defende programa espacial do país" [Eduardo Campos advocates for the country's space program]. Jornal do Commercio (in Brazilian Portuguese). Vol. CLXXVII, no. 153. 3 April 2004. p. B-8.
- "Base de Alcântara voltará a funcionar" [The Alcântara Base Will Resume Operations]. Correio Braziliense (in Brazilian Portuguese). No. 15.002. 17 June 2004. p. 19.
- "Governo não quer ampliar inspeções nucleares no país" [The government does not want to expand nuclear inspections in the country]. Jornal do Commercio (in Brazilian Portuguese). Vol. CLXXVII, no. 256. 6 August 2004. p. A-13.
- "Câmara sugere mudanças" [Chamber of Deputies Suggests Changes]. Correio Braziliense (in Brazilian Portuguese). No. 15.080. 31 August 2004. p. 26.
- "Nova perícia em Alcântara" [New forensic investigation in Alcântara]. Correio Braziliense (in Brazilian Portuguese). No. 15.089. 9 September 2004. p. 17.
- Barros, Hércules (16 September 2004). "Ciência para o povo" [Science for the People]. Correio Braziliense (in Brazilian Portuguese). No. 15.096. p. 20.
- "Sonho do satélite" [Satellite Dream]. Correio Braziliense (in Brazilian Portuguese). No. 15.661. 4 April 2006. p. 10.
- Menocchi, Simone (29 October 2006). "Vítima de acidente com VLS é indenizada" [Victim of VLS accident receives compensation]. Jornal do Commercio (in Brazilian Portuguese). Vol. CLXXX, no. 19. p. B-7.
- "Medidas cautelares adotadas em 2007 pelo TCU para conter desvios" [Precautionary measures adopted in 2007 by the Federal Court of Auditors to curb embezzlement]. Correio Braziliense (in Brazilian Portuguese). No. 16.184. 9 September 2007. p. 2.
- "Projeto de foguete retomado" [Rocket Project Resumes]. Correio Braziliense (in Brazilian Portuguese). No. 16.494. 19 July 2008. p. 13.
- Costa, Breno (22 August 2008). "Investimento na base de Alcântara foi zero em 2008" [Investment in the Alcântara base was zero in 2008]. Folha de São Paulo (in Brazilian Portuguese).
- "Veículo lançador em teste" [Launch vehicle undergoing testing]. Jornal do Commercio (in Brazilian Portuguese). Vol. CLXXXVII, no. 15. 21 October 2008. p. B-9.
- Rollemberg; Veloso; Queiroz Filho (2009). A política espacial brasileira [Brazilian Space Policy] (in Brazilian Portuguese). Brasília: Edições Câmara. p. 475. ISBN 978-85-736-5811-8.
- "Bastante diferente do estilo de Lula" [Quite different from Lula's style]. Correio Braziliense (in Brazilian Portuguese). No. 17.403. 14 January 2011. p. 6.
- "Concluída montagem do Veículo Lançador de Satélite (VLS-1) na nova torre de lançamento" [Assembly of the Satellite Launch Vehicle (VLS-1) at the new launch tower has been completed] (in Brazilian Portuguese). 12 July 2012. Archived from the original on 8 March 2013.
- D'Alama, Luna (22 August 2013). "Tragédia em Alcântara faz dez anos e Brasil ainda sonha em lançar foguete" [It's been ten years since the Alcântara tragedy, and Brazil still dreams of launching a rocket]. G1 (in Brazilian Portuguese). Archived from the original on 25 August 2013.
- Konner (22 August 2013). "Dez anos depois, explosão de foguete ainda trava setor espacial brasileiro" [Ten years later, the rocket explosion still holds back Brazil's space industry] (in Brazilian Portuguese). Archived from the original on 6 May 2019.
- Leite, Henrique Emiliano (1 October 2013). "Análise Técnica do Relatório da Investigação do Acidente Ocorrido com o VLS-1 V03, em 22 de agosto de 2003, em Alcântara, Maranhão" [Technical Analysis of the Investigation Report on the Accident Involving the VLS-1 V03, which occurred on August 22, 2003, in Alcântara, Maranhão.] (in Brazilian Portuguese). Archived from the original on 9 June 2021.
- Ferraz (5 November 2013). "Suspeita de sabotagem fez Brasil investigar franceses em Alcântara" [Suspeita de sabotagem fez Brasil investigar franceses em Alcântara]. Folha de São Paulo (in Brazilian Portuguese). Archived from the original on 5 November 2013.
- Karine Melo (12 February 2013). "Dez anos depois de tragédia, Base de Alcântara ainda finaliza reconstrução" [Ten years after the tragedy, the Alcântara Launch Center is still completing its reconstruction]. Agência Brasil (in Brazilian Portuguese). Archived from the original on 25 April 2022.
- Lele, Ajey (18 May 2015). "The need for a launch vehicle development organization: Learning from Brazil's experience". The Space Review.
- Nogueira, Débora (27 May 2015). "Construção de lançador de satélites não deve ser concluída, diz agência" [Construction of satellite launcher is unlikely to be completed, agency says]. Uol (in Brazilian Portuguese).
- "EDITORIAL - O Fim do VLS" [EDITORIAL - The End of the VLS Program] (in Brazilian Portuguese). 29 December 2016. Archived from the original on 30 December 2016.
- Zurita, Marcelo (2021). "18 anos do acidente de Alcântara, a tragédia que marcou a história do Programa Espacial Brasileiro" [18 years since the Alcântara accident, the tragedy that shaped the history of the Brazilian Space Program] (in Brazilian Portuguese). Archived from the original on 6 November 2021.
- Silva, Bernardino Coelho da (2021). Desafios de Ícaro [Icarus's Challenges] (in Brazilian Portuguese). Clube de Autores. p. 690. ISBN 978-65-00-24466-3.
- Bruna Arimathea and Caio Possati (17 August 2023). "Ep 01: Fogo em Alcântara" [Episode 01: Fire in Alcântara]. Spotify (Podcast). Alcântara: O Desastre Espacial Brasileiro (in Brazilian Portuguese). Estadão.
- Bruna Arimathea and Caio Possati (22 August 2023). "Ep 02: As peças do acidente" [Episode 02: The Pieces of the Accident]. Spotify (Podcast). Alcântara: O Desastre Espacial Brasileiro (in Brazilian Portuguese). Estadão.
