= Satélite Tecnológico =

Brazilian satellite

SATEC
- Mission type: Earth orbiter
- Operator: INPE
- COSPAR ID: F20030822A
- Mission duration: 6 months (planned)

Spacecraft properties
- Manufacturer: INPE
- Launch mass: 65.0 kilograms (143.3 lb)

Start of mission
- Launch date: August 25, 2003 (planned); August 23, 2003, 16:30 UTC (Alcântara accident)
- Rocket: VLS-1 V3
- Launch site: Alcântara VLS Pad

Orbital parameters
- Reference system: Geocentric
- Regime: Heliosynchronous
- Eccentricity: 0
- Perigee altitude: 750 kilometres (470 mi)
- Apogee altitude: 750 kilometres (470 mi)
- Inclination: 15°
- Period: 100 minutes
- Epoch: Planned

The Satélite Tecnológico ("Technologic Satellite" in English) or SATEC, was a microsatellite of scientific applications, designed, developed, built and tested by Brazilian technicians, engineers and scientists working at INPE (National Institute for Space Research).

== Features ==
The primary objective of SATEC was to test the technological equipment embedded in the VLS-1, providing more information for future applications.

The SATEC scientific satellite had the following characteristics:

- Format: parallelepiped with 61 cm x 66 cm x 66 cm
- Mass: 65 kilograms (143 lb)
- Orbit: Heliosynchronous
- Stabilization: By rotation at 120 rpm
- Precision: 1 degree
- Altitude: 750 kilometers

== Payload ==
The instrumentation shipped in SATEC was as follows:

- Solar generator: Silicon cells generating 20 W
- Battery: Type NiCd – 5 Ah
- PCU: with linear series technology
- GPS receiver: adapted to the conditions of flight
- Transmitter: S-band with BPSK modulation

== Mission ==
SATEC, which had an estimated life of 6 months, was lost with UNOSAT in the explosion of the VLS-1 launch vehicle on 23 August 2003 in an explosion three days before the launch date. This event came to be known as Accident of Alcantara.
