= UNOSAT (nanosatellite) =

Brazilian scientific nanosatellite

- Mission type: Earth orbiter
- Operator: INPE
- COSPAR ID: 2003-E01

Spacecraft properties
- Manufacturer: Northern Paraná University
- Launch mass: 8.83 kilograms (19 lb)

Start of mission
- Launch date: August 25, 2003 (planned); August 23, 2003 (Accident of Alcântara
- Rocket: VLS-1 V03
- Launch site: Alcântara VLS Pad

Orbital parameters
- Reference system: Geocentric
- Regime: Low Earth
- Eccentricity: 0
- Perigee altitude: 750 kilometres (470 mi)
- Apogee altitude: 750 kilometres (470 mi)
- Inclination: 16°
- Period: 100 minutes
- Epoch: Planned

UNOSAT was a Brazilian scientific applications nanosatellite, designed, developed, built and tested by researchers and students working at the Northern Paraná University.

== Features ==
The primary objective of UNOSAT was to transmit voice messages and a telemetry data packet in AX25 protocol.

The UNOSAT scientific satellite had the following characteristics:

=== General ===
UNOSAT Nanosatellite characteristics:

- Format: parallelepiped with 46 cm x 25 cm x 8.5 cm
- Mass: 8.83 kilograms (19.5 lb)
- Orbit: heliosynchronous
- Stabilization: by rotation at 120 rpm
- Precision: 1 degree
- Altitude: 750 kilometers (470 mi)

=== Payload ===
The instrumentation shipped in UNOSAT was basically composed of: data collectors and transmitters.

The following data would be transmitted to earth:

- Voice message identifying the satellite
- Telemetry
- Temperature of solar panels
- Rechargeable battery temperatures
- Temperature of the transmitter and the on-board computer
- Battery voltage
- Centripetal acceleration

== Mission ==
As UNOSAT was planned to be launched as a secondary payload along with the SATEC satellite and it would be impossible for the launcher to put them into distinct orbits, both satellites were mechanically connected, although there was electrical and telemetry autonomy between the two. That satellite was lost in the explosion of the VLS-1 V03 launch vehicle on August 23, 2003 in an explosion three days before the launch date. This event came to be known as accident of Alcantara.
