= Hélio Waldman =

Brazilian scientist

Hélio Waldman is a Brazilian scientist best known for his work as rector of the Universidade Federal do ABC, UFABC (2010–2014) and as dean of research at the Universidade Estadual de Campinas, Unicamp (1986–1990). Currently working as a researcher and rector of UFABC.

== Career ==
Waldman has served as:

- Rector of the Universidade Federal do ABC (UFABC).
- Dean of Research at the Universidade Estadual de Campinas (Unicamp).
- Editor of the Journal of the Brazilian Society of Telecommunications (SBrT).
- President of the Brazilian Society of Telecommunications (SBrT).
- Director of Faculdade de Engennharia de Campinas.
- Professor, Institute Alberto Luiz Coimbra of Graduate Studies and Research in Engineering (COPPE/UFRJ).

== Education ==
- Electronic Engineering - Instituto Tecnológico de Aeronáutica, ITA - 1966.
- M.Sc. (Electrical Engineering) - Stanford University - 1968.
- Ph.D. (Electrical Engineering) - Stanford University - 1972.

== Published books ==
- Telecomunicações: Princípios e Tendências (in English: Telecommunications: Principles and Trends). 1997, Editor Erica, São Paulo.
- Fibras Opticas: Tecnologia e Projeto de Sistemas (in English: Optical Fibers: Technology and Systems Design). 1991, Makron Books, New York.
- Processamento de Sinais Digitais (in English: Digital Signal Processing). 1987, La Kapelusz Editorial, Buenos Aires.

== Awards ==
- Commander of the Ordem Nacional do Mérito Científico - President of the Republic of Brazil - 2010.
- Productivity Research Fellow of the Conselho Nacional de Desenvolvimento Científico e Tecnológico, CNPq - Level 1B.
- Emeritus Member of SBrT - Brazilian Society of Telecommunications, SBrT - 2009.
- Senior member of SBrT - Brazilian Society of Telecommunications, SBrT - 2001.
- Academic Recognition Scholarship "Zeferino Vaz" - Universidade Estadual de Campinas, Unicamp - 1996.
- Senior Member of IEEE - Institute of Electrical and Electronics Engineers, IEEE - 1990.

== Cronologia ==
Preceded by Adalberto Fazzio	Rector of UFABC; 2010 - 2014	Succeeded by Klaus Capelle

== See also ==
- Universidade Federal do ABC
- Ordem Nacional do Mérito Científico
