= Luiz Bevilacqua =

Brazilian scientist

Luiz Bevilacqua is a Brazilian scientist best known for his work as President of the Brazilian Space Agency (2003–2004) and as Secretary General of the Ministry of Science and Technology (1992–1993). Currently serves as Emeritus Professor, UFRJ and coordinator of the Center for Cognition and Complex Systems of UFABC.

== Positions held ==
Bevilacqua has served as:

- Vice-Rector of the Pontifícia Universidade Católica do Rio de Janeiro (PUC-Rio).
- Director of the Instituto Alberto Luiz Coimbra de Pos-Graduacao e Pesquisa de Engenharia (COPPE-UFRJ).
- Creator of the Civil Engineering Program of Instituto Alberto Luiz Coimbra de Pos-Graduacao e Pesquisa de Engenharia (COPPE-UFRJ).
- Project Coordinator of Remotely Operated Vehicles (COPPETEC-Petrobras).
- Coordinator of the consultancy to determine the structural integrity of the Mills Ball Shark (COPPETEC-Companhia Vale do Rio Doce).
- Responsible for structural design of the spillways and gates of the Furnas Reservoir.
- Responsible for the design of nuclear components (pipes and pressure vessels) class nuclear of power plants Angra I and Angra II.
- President of the Brazilian Association of Mechanical Sciences (ABCM).
- President of the comite of engineering of the Coordenação de Aperfeiçoamento de Pessoal de Nível Superior (CAPES).
- Secretary-General of the Ministry of Science and Technology (MCT).
- Director of Research Units of the Conselho Nacional de Desenvolvimento Científico e Tecnológico (CNPq).
- Scientific Director of Fundação Carlos Chagas Filho de Amparo à Pesquisa do Estado do Rio de Janeiro (FAPERJ).
- Coordinator of the Graduate of the Laboratório Nacional de Computação Científica (LNCC).
- President of the Brazilian Space Agency (AEB).
- Professor Emeritus, Universidade Federal do Rio de Janeiro (UFRJ).
- Member of the team that created the education program of the Universidade Federal do ABC (UFABC).
- Presidente of the Implementation's Comite of the Universidade Federal do ABC (UFABC).
- Vice-Rector of the Universidade Federal do ABC (UFABC).
- Rector of the Universidade Federal do ABC (UFABC).
- Coordinator of the Center for Cognition and Complex Systems, Universidade Federal do ABC (UFABC).

== University ==
- Civil Engineer - University of Brazil, UB - 1959.
- Specialist (Bridges and Structures) - Technische Hochschule Stuttgart - 1961.
- Professor (Electrical resistance) - Federal University of Rio de Janeiro, UFRJ - 1966.
- Ph.D. (Applied Mechanics) - Stanford University - 1971.

== Awards ==
Decorations:

- Commander of the Order of Rio Branco - Ministry of External Relations - 1994
- Commander of the Brazilian Order of Scientific Merit - President of the Republic of Brazil - 1995
- Grand Cross of the Brazilian Order of Scientific Merit - President of the Republic of Brazil - 2000
- Award "Almirante Álvaro Alberto (Engineering Sciences) - National Council of Scientific and Technological Development - 1995
- Award "Prêmio Anísio Teixeira" - Coordenação de Aperfeiçoamento de Pessoal de Nível Superior - 2011

== Cronologia ==
| Preceded by Hermano Tavares | Rector of UFABC; 2010 - 2014 | Succeeded by Adalberto Fazzio |

== See also ==
- UFABC - Federal University of ABC
- Brazilian Order of Scientific Merit
- Model of the Fluid Particle
