= SAE Aerodesign =

Brazilian-American series of engineering competitions

SAE Aero Design, also called the SAE Aero Design Collegiate Design Series, is a series of competitive aerospace and mechanical engineering events held in the United States and Brazil every year. It is conducted by SAE International. It is generally divided into three categories: Regular class, Advanced class and Micro class.

== Regular class ==
SAE Aero Design regular class requires teams to construct a plane within specified parameters annually updated on the SAE Aero Design website. Each team is judged on three categories: Oral presentation, written report, and flight performance. The objective of the regular class is to design and construct a radio-controlled model aircraft that will lift the largest payload while still maintaining structural integrity.
