= Emeraude (rocket) =

French rocket system of the 1960s

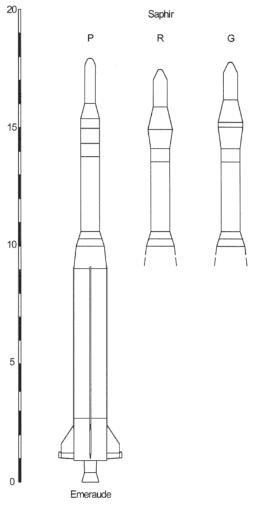
- Emeraude as the first stage of Saphir
- Function: Sounding rocket
- Manufacturer: SEREB
- Country of origin: France

Size
- Height: 17.93 metres (58.8 ft)
- Diameter: 1.40 metres (4.6 ft)
- Mass: 18,200 kilograms (40,100 lb)
- Stages: 1

Associated rockets
- Derivative work: Saphir (rocket)

Launch history
- Status: Retired
- Launch sites: CIEES
- Total launches: 5
- Success(es): 2
- Failure: 3
- First flight: June 15, 1964
- Last flight: May 13, 1965

First stage – Emeraude
- Powered by: 1 Vexin-B
- Maximum thrust: 273.7 kilonewtons (61,500 lb_{f})
- Specific impulse: 203 seconds
- Burn time: 91 seconds
- Propellant: HNO_{3}/gasoline turpentine

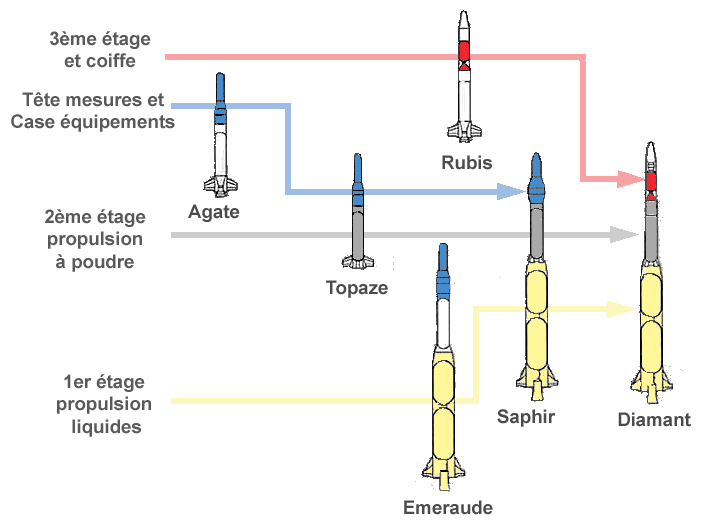
Military space program Pierres précieuses (fr.: gemstones) that included the five prototypes Agathe, Topaze, Emeraude, Rubis and Saphir

VE 121 Émeraude (French for "emerald") was a large French sounding rocket of the 1960s.

It built on the experiences of the Véronique and Vesta programs, and though it was only used for one year, it tested important technologies that were used in later French launch vehicles. It was part of the pierres précieuses (fr.: gemstones) program, that included five prototypes Agathe, Topaze, Emeraude, Rubis and Saphir, leading up to the Diamant orbital rocket.

The rocket was liquid-fueled and carried 12.8 tonnes of fuel and oxidizer – nitric acid and gasoline turpentine – which were pressure-fed into the Vexin-B engine, providing a total of 301.55 kN of thrust. Pitch and yaw control were provided by gimbaling the engine while roll control was provided by aerodynamic fins. The rocket could carry a 385 kilograms (849 lb) payload to an altitude of 200 km.

Its codename, VE121, indicates that it is a "Véhicule Expérimental" (Experimental Vehicle) with 1 stage, using liquid propellant (code 2), and guided (code 1).

== Launches ==
Emeraude was launched exclusively from the Centre interarmées d'essais d'engins spéciaux (CIEES) launch site in Hammaguir, Algeria (Hammaguira Brigitte pad).

The first launches of Emeraude – on June 15, June 17, and October 20, 1964 – were failures, casting doubt on the entire pierres précieuses program. These three launches had failed because of propellant sloshing due to pogo oscillation, a problem that was fixed before the fourth launch. However, the final two launches – on February 27 and May 13, 1965 – went well, with the latter flight reaching an altitude of 180 km.

The final test carried a dummy Topaze stage for testing the aerodynamics of Emeraude's successor, the Saphir.

Date	Launch Complex	Mission Description	Apogee (km)
1964 June 15	Hammaguira Brigitte	Test mission, failure	0 km
1964 June 17	Hammaguira Brigitte	Test mission, failure	0 km
1964 Oct 20	Hammaguira Brigitte	Test mission, failure	0 km
1965 Feb 27	Hammaguira Brigitte	Test mission	200 km
1965 May 13	Hammaguira Brigitte	Test mission	200 km
