= Saphir (rocket) =

French two stage rocket

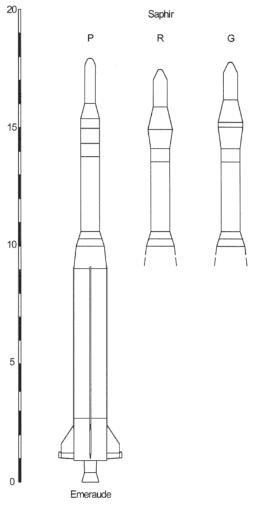
- A diagram of the Saphir rocket
- Manufacturer: SEREB
- Country of origin: France

Size
- Height: 17.77 metres (58.3 ft)
- Diameter: 1.40 metres (4 ft 7 in)
- Mass: 18,058 kilograms (39,811 lb)
- Stages: 2

Associated rockets
- Family: Pierres Précieuses ("Precious Stones")
- Derivative work: Diamant

Launch history
- Status: Retired
- Launch sites: CIEES
- Total launches: 15
- Success(es): 13
- Failure(s): 2
- First flight: 5 July 1965
- Last flight: 27 January 1967

First stage – Emeraude
- Powered by: 1 Vexin-B
- Maximum thrust: 301.55 kilonewtons (67,790 lb_{f})
- Specific impulse: 251 seconds
- Burn time: 93 seconds
- Propellant: N_{2}O_{4}/UDMH

Second stage – Topaze
- Maximum thrust: 120 kilonewtons (27,000 lb_{f})
- Specific impulse: 255 seconds
- Burn time: 39 seconds
- Propellant: solid

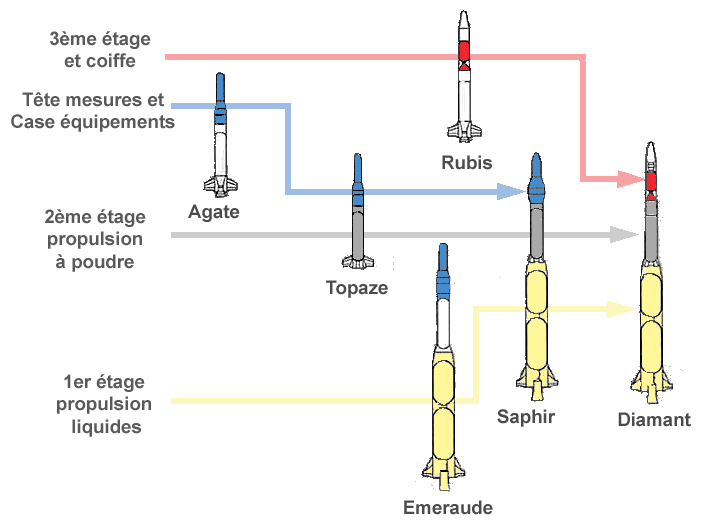
Military space program pierres précieuses (fr.: gemstones) that included the five prototypes Agathe, Topaze, Emeraude, Rubis and Saphir.

VE 231 Saphir (French, meaning sapphire) was a French two stage sounding rocket.

It was part of the pierres précieuses (fr.: gemstones) program, that included five prototypes Agathe, Topaze, Emeraude, Rubis and Saphir, leading up to the Diamant orbital rocket.

Its codename, VE 231, indicates that it is a "Véhicule Expérimental" (Experimental Vehicle) with 2 stages, using liquid and solid propellant (code 3), and guided (code 1).

Saphir was used between 1965 and 1967 and had a payload capacity of 365 kilograms (805 lb). The rocket could reach a maximum altitude of 1,000 kilometres (620 mi) and produced thrust of 280 kilonewtons (63,000 lb_{f}) at launch. Saphir had a launch mass of 18,058 kilograms (39,811 lb), a diameter of 1.40 metres (4 ft 7 in) and a length of 17.77 metres (58.3 ft).

Saphir variants were designed to allow testing of radio-controlled guidance (VE231P), inertial guidance (VE231G), and warhead separation and ablative heat shielding of a re-entry vehicle (VE231R).

The Diamant rocket, which carried the first French satellite, Asterix-1, into orbit, was developed from the Saphir with the addition of a third stage. After the successful launch of Diamant, Saphir rockets were used to test technologies for France's burgeoning intercontinental ballistic missile development—as mentioned before, radio and inertial guidance, warhead separation, and ablative heat shielding of a re-entry vehicle.

== Launches ==
Saphir was launched 15 times from CIEES, Hammaguir, from July 5, 1965, to January 27, 1967.

Number	Date	Variant	Payload	Apogee (km)	Result
1	5 Jul 1965	VE231P	Reentry P1	1000	Success
2	10 Jul 1965	VE231P	Reentry P2	50	Failure
3	9 Oct 1965	VE231P	Reentry P3	1150	Success
4	13 Mar 1966	VE231G	Reentry G1	1000	Success
5	18 Mar 1966	VE231G	Reentry G2	1000	Success
6	28 Mar 1966	VE231R	Reentry R2	1000	Success
7	5 Apr 1966	VE231R	Reentry R1	1000	Success
8	23 Jun 1966	VE231R	Reentry R4	1000	Success
9	5 Oct 1966	VE231R	Reentry R3	1000	Success
10	28 Oct 1966	VE231G	Reentry G3	1000	Success
11	2 Nov 1966	VE231G	Reentry G4	1000	Success
12	2 Dec 1966	VE231R	Reentry R5	50	Failure
13	13 Dec 1966	VE231R	Reentry R6	1000	Success
14	19 Jan 1967	VE231G	Reentry G5	1000	Success
15	27 Jan 1967	VE231G	Reentry G6	1000	Success

== See also ==
- French space program
- Veronique (rocket)
