= Monica (rocket) =

Small French sounding rocket

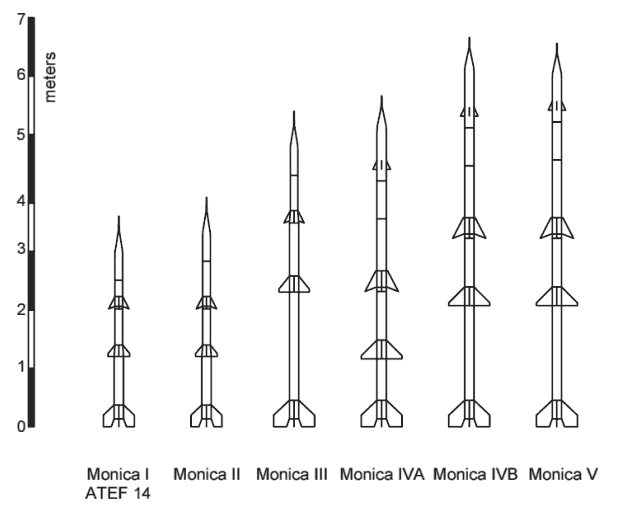
- Monica rocket family
- Country of origin: France

Size
- Height: 3.05 to 6.27m
- Diameter: 1.3 to 1.6 m
- Mass: 62 to 154 kg
- Stages: 3

Capacity

Launch history
- Status: Succeeded by the ONERA test vehicles
- Launch sites: CIEES, CERES Ile du Levant

Monica is the designation of a small French sounding rocket. It was intended as a cheaper counterpart to the relatively expensive Veronique rockets.

Monica was a 3-stage rocket, with all stages burning solid fuel: the Melanie (burning Plastolite) for the first stage and Theodore and Oreste (burning Epictete) for the second and third stages. The first stage delivered 450 daN (decanewtons) for 3 seconds and the two upper stages deliver 50 daN for 15 and 5.5 seconds, respectively.

It was built in several versions (Meteo, Monica I to V, MD-01, Grannos), which were between 3.05 and 6.27 m long and had a takeoff weight between 62 and 154 kg.

It was launched several times between 1955 and 1962 at the CIEES launch site in Hammaguir, French Algeria, and the Ile du Levant site in France.

The Monica design process encountered a number of difficulties, leading to many failed tests and the early cancellation of the program in 1962. However, elements of its design were later incorporated into more successful ONERA test vehicles.

== Versions ==
Monica vehicles used different solid fuel rocket engines:

Monica rocket engine characteristics
Stage / Engine	Length (mm)	Diameter (mm)	Propellant mass (kg)	Total impulse (daNs)	Burning time (s)
Melanie	1065	160	15	3100	5
"2Melanie"	2170	160	30	6200	5
Prosper	1180	160	23.5	4700	10
Theodore	815	130	9.4	1800	10
Oreste	490	130	3.6	680	8

Monica vehicles had several versions, according to the rocket stages used:

Monica version characteristics
Type	Stages	Length (mm)	Total weight (kg)	Payload weight (kg)	Peak altitude (km)
Monica I	Melanie-Theodore-Oreste	3050	62	15	53
Monica II	Melanie-Theodore-Theodore	3375	71	15	103
Monica III	"2Melanie"-Prosper-Theodore	4845	118	15	145
Monica IVA	Melanie-Prosper-Prosper	5115	123	15	94
Monica IVB	"2Melanie"-Melanie-Prosper	5115	123	15	94
Monica V	"2Melanie"-Prosper-Prosper	6270	154	15	160
