= Topaze (rocket) =

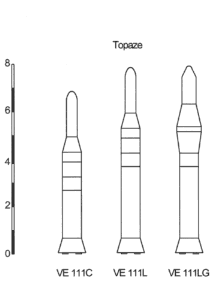
- Topaze versions
- Function: Sounding rocket
- Manufacturer: SEREB
- Country of origin: France

Size
- Height: VE111C: 7.07 metres (23.2 ft); VE111L: 7.90 metres (25.9 ft)
- Mass: VE111C: 2,900 kilograms (6,400 lb); VE111L: 3,434 kilograms (7,571 lb)
- Stages: 1

Associated rockets
- Derivative work: Saphir, Diamant

Launch history
- Status: Retired
- Launch sites: CIEES
- Total launches: 14
- First flight: 19 December 1962
- Last flight: 1965

VE111C stage
- Powered by: NA802
- Maximum thrust: 120 kilonewtons (27,000 lb_{f})
- Propellant: Solid

VE111L / VE111LG stage
- Powered by: NA803
- Maximum thrust: 147 kilonewtons (33,000 lb_{f})
- Propellant: Solid

Topaze (Véhicule Expérimental 111 Topaze) is the designation of a French sounding rocket. The Topaze was developed by several French companies, notably Nord Aviation and Sud Aviation, and built by SEREB (a joint venture of Nord and Sud, now known as Aérospatiale) and was the first guidable French sounding rocket.

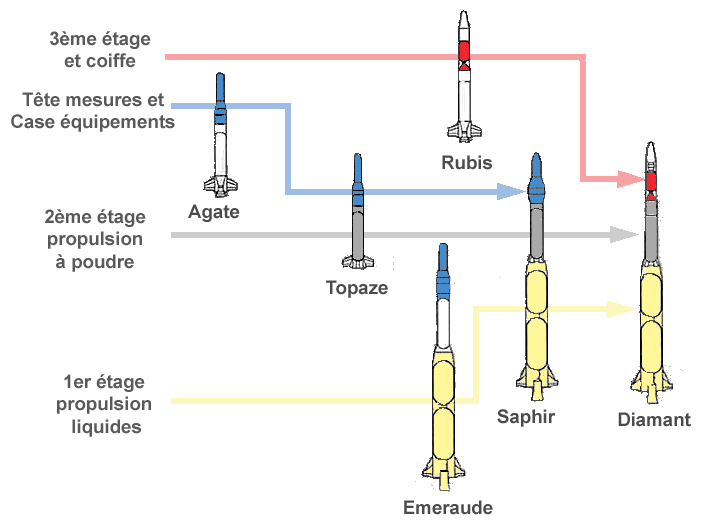
Military space program Pierres précieuses (fr.: gemstones) that included the five prototypes Agathe, Topaze, Emeraude, Rubis et Saphir.

It was part of the Pierres précieuses (fr.: gemstones) program, that included five prototypes Agathe, Topaze, Emeraude, Rubis and Saphir, leading up to the Diamant orbital rocket.

The name indicates that it is a "Véhicule Expérimental" (Experimental Vehicle) with 1 stage, using solid propulsion (code 1), and guided (code 1).

The Topaze was launched 14 times from the CIEES launch site in Hammaguir (Hammaguira Bacchus pad), Algeria, by ONERA.

== Versions ==
There were three versions of the Topaze:

Topaze versions

VE111C

VE111L

VE111LG

=== Topaze VE111 / Topaze VE111C ===
==== Details ====
- payload mass: 410 kg (900 lb)
- total mass: 2900 kg (6400 lb)
- length: 7.07 m (23.2 ft)
- range: 80 km (49 mi)
- liftoff thrust: 120.0 kN
- Soleil NA802 "Mammouth" solid rocket engine

==== Launches ====
There were launches between 1962 and 1964, reaching an apogee of 80 km (49 mi).

Topaze VE111 launches
Date	Mission Description	Apogee (km)
1962 December 19	Test mission	80
1963 March 22	Test mission	80
1963 March 28	Test mission	80
1963 June 21	Test mission	80
1963 June 27	Test mission	80
1963 October 24	Test mission	80
1964 June 4	MSBS test, failure	
1964 October 21	MSBS test	80
1964 December 11	MSBS test	80
1964 December 15	MSBS test	80

=== Topaze VE111L ===
==== Details ====
- payload mass: 360 kg (840 lb)
- total mass: 3434 kg (7570 lb)
- length: 7.90 m (25.9 ft)
- range: 110 km (68 mi)
- liftoff thrust 147.0 kN
- Soleil NA803 solid rocket engine

==== Launches ====
This version was launched eight times between 21 December 1963 and 21 May 1965, with apogees up to 110 km (68 mi).

Topaze VE111L launches
Date	Mission Description	Apogee (km)
1963 December 21	Test mission	110 km
1964 March 11	Test mission	110 km

=== Topaze VE111LG ===
==== Details ====
- Soleil NA803 solid rocket engine

==== Launches ====
This version was launched two times in 1965.

Topaze VE111LG launches
Date	Mission Description	Apogee (km)
1965 May 18	Test mission	100 km
1965 May 21	Test mission	100 km

== Other uses ==
The Topaze was also used as the second stage of the Diamant rocket, the launch vehicle for France's first satellite, the Asterix-1, and the Saphir rocket.
