= Agate (rocket) =

French test rocket

- Agate VE 110
- Function: Sounding rocket
- Manufacturer: SEREB
- Country of origin: France

Size
- Height: 8.50 metres (27.9 ft)
- Diameter: 0.80 metres (2.6 ft)
- Mass: 3,200 kilograms (7,100 lb)
- Stages: 1

Associated rockets
- Derivative work: Rubis, Diamant

Launch history
- Status: Retired
- Launch sites: CIEES/CERES Ile du Levant
- Total launches: 12
- Success(es): 11
- Failure: 1
- First flight: June 3, 1961
- Last flight: April 20, 1964

First stage
- Powered by: NA801 Mammouth
- Maximum thrust: 186 kilonewtons (42,000 lb_{f})
- Propellant: Solid

VE 110 Agate is the designation of an unguided French test rocket developed in the late 1950s and early 1960s.

It was part of the Pierres précieuses (fr.: gemstones) program, that included five prototypes Agathe, Topaze, Emeraude, Rubis and Saphir, leading up to the Diamant orbital rocket.

The Agate has a length of 8.50 metres, a diameter of 0.80 metres, a start mass of 3.2 tonnes, a takeoff thrust of 186 kN and a ceiling of 20 km. It used a NA801 Mammouth solid propellant rocket engine (same as the Rubis VE-210).

The initial version was designated VE (Véhicule Expérimental) 110, while the VE 110RR version was used to develop recovery procedures at sea. The name indicates that it is a "Véhicule Expérimental" (Experimental Vehicle) with 1 stage, using solid propulsion (code 1), and not guided (code 0).

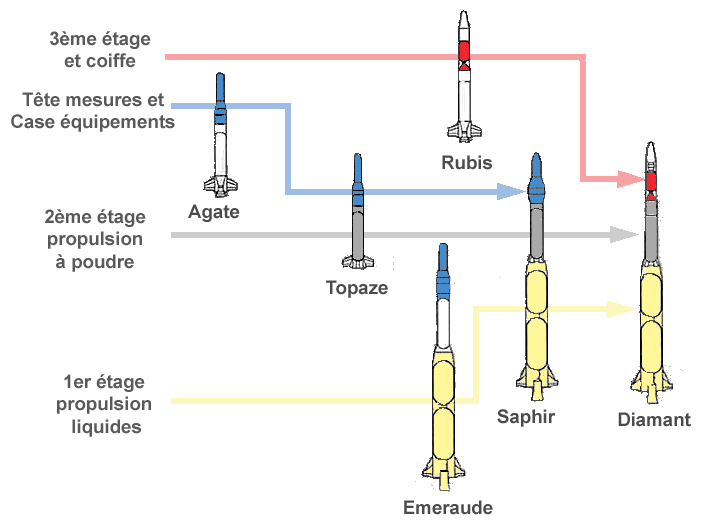
Military space program Pierres précieuses (fr.: gemstones) that included the five prototypes Agathe, Topaze, Emeraude, Rubis et Saphir.

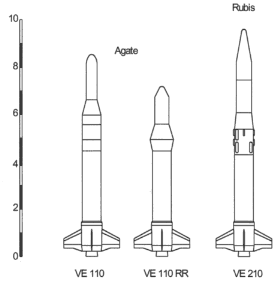
Agate and Rubis rockets

== Launches ==
The Agate was launched from the CIEES test site in Hammaguir, French Algeria, and the Île du Levant test site, in order to test instrument capsules and recovery systems.

Date	Launch site	Launch Complex	Mission Description	Apogee (km)
1961 June 3	Hammaguira	Hammaguira Bacchus	Test mission	20
1961 June 7	Hammaguira	Hammaguira Bacchus	Test mission	20
1961 Nov 13	Hammaguira	Hammaguira Bacchus	Test mission	20
1961 Nov 17	Hammaguira	Hammaguira Bacchus	Test mission	20
1962 Mar 19	Hammaguira	Hammaguira Bacchus	Test mission	20
1962 Mar 23	Hammaguira	Hammaguira Bacchus	Test mission	20
1963 May 18	Hammaguira	Hammaguira Brigitte	Test mission	20
1963 May 21	Hammaguira	Hammaguira Brigitte	Test mission	20
1963 Nov 19	Île du Levant	CERES	Failure	0
1963 Nov 28	Ile du Levant	CERES	Test mission	20
1964 Feb 28	Ile du Levant	CERES	Test mission	20
1964 Apr 20	Ile du Levant	CERES	Test mission	20

== See also ==
- French space program
- Rubis
- Diamant
- Nuclear dissuasion
