= Super V-2 =

Ballistic missile designed in France

The Super V2 was a planned intermediate-range ballistic missile designed in France in 1946–47. It was the creation of German engineers who had worked on the original V2 rocket. Four variants, with a range of up to 3,600 kilometres (2,200 mi) and capable of carrying warheads of up to 1,000 kilograms (2,200 lb), were envisaged. However, the French government declined to fund practical development and the programme was cancelled in 1948. The research done on the Super V-2 was repurposed to develop the Véronique sounding rocket, ultimately leading to the Ariane rocket family.

== Development ==
Between May and September 1946, France's Centre for the Study of Self-Propelled Missiles (CEPA) recruited around thirty German engineers who had previously worked on the rocket programmes of Nazi Germany at the Peenemünde Army Research Center. Like its counterparts in the United Kingdom, United States and Soviet Union, CEPA aimed to obtain and further develop the rocket technology devised by Germany during the Second World War.

The engineers were settled in Vernon, halfway between Paris and Rouen. They devised a two-stage project, no. 4211, which envisaged assembling and flying V-2 missiles constructed with original parts. Around 75 percent of the parts needed to assemble thirty V-2 missiles were acquired from companies in France and the French occupation zone in Germany that had supplied the original German V-2 project. However, the French were unable to acquire the remaining 25 percent of the parts due to the refusal of the United States and Soviet Union to supply them. It was also found that it would take much longer than expected to build test facilities in France and French-ruled Algeria.

This forced a different approach. The work on project 4211 was redirected towards an existing parallel project, no. 4212, that had been started to create a "pure French" development of the Aggregat rocket family – of which the V-2 was a member – along the lines originally envisaged by the Peenemünde researchers during the war. A new and much more powerful engine would be developed for the V-2, powered by new fuels, to create an advanced long-range V-2-based rocket. The rocket would be the same size as the original V-2 but would be much stronger structurally and capable of generating up to 40 tons of thrust, with detachable booster rockets and aerodynamic surfaces to increase its range.

== Variants ==
Four versions of the Super V-2 were envisaged, each representing a progressive technological increase from its predecessor:

- R1 – a 1,000 kg (2,200 lb) warhead and 1,500 km (930 mi) range. Propelled by nitric acid and kerosene, pressure-fed to the engine by a gas generator.
- R2 – a 1,000 kg (2,200 lb) warhead and 1,400 km (870 mi) range, with a turbopump-fed engine fuelled by liquid oxygen and kerosene.
- R2S – a 1,000 kg (2,200 lb) warhead and 1,800 km (1,100 mi) range, or a 500 kg (1,100 lb) warhead over a 2,250 km (1,400 mi) range. Propelled by nitric acid and kerosene fuel with a turbopump-fed engine. This would be the first French strategic ballistic missile to go into production, bringing together all the technological advances of the first two variants.
- R2M – a 1,000 kg (2,200 lb) warhead with a 3,600 km (2,200 mi) range, using a turbopump-fed engine fuelled by nitric acid and kerosene. This would essentially be a French version of the A9/A10 "Amerika Rakete" envisaged by von Braun, capable of striking targets as far away as Russia; its greatly increased range relied on using a detachable booster rocket and aerodynamic lift surfaces that would enable the rocket to reach a high altitude and then glide to its target.

== Outcome ==
Although much work was done on the theoretical design of the Super V2 and its fuel handling systems, the French government expressed little interest in funding practical development. The project was cancelled in 1948 and the development work was refocused towards the much smaller Véronique rocket. This ultimately led to the development of the Diamant rockets in the 1960s and the Ariane rockets from the 1970s onwards.
