= Centre interarmées d'essais d'engins spéciaux =

France's first space launch and ballistic missile testing facility

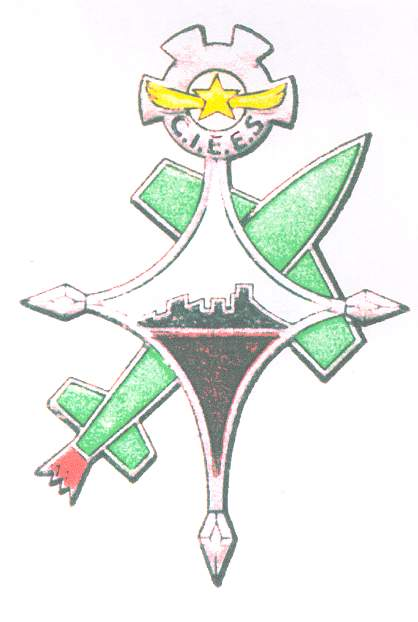
Interarmy Special Vehicles Test Centre
- Centre Interarmées d'Essais d'Engins Spéciaux (CIEES)
- Near Hammaguir in French Algeria

Site information
- Type: Spaceport; Missile testing range
- Owner: French Air Force, French Army
- Open to the public: No

Location
- Location of CIEES in French Algeria
- Coordinates: 30°46′41″N 03°03′19″W

Site history
- Built: 1947
- In use: 1952–1967
- Fate: Abandoned following Algerian independence

Garrison information
- Garrison: 621st Special Weapons Group, 80th Service Battalion

The Centre Interarmées d'Essais d'Engins Spéciaux (CIEES, lit. 'Interarmy Special Vehicles Test Centre') was France's first space launch and ballistic missile testing facility. Outside France, the facility is often referred to by the name of the nearest town, Hammaguir. It was established on 24 April 1947, by ministerial decree as the Special Weapons Test Center (CEES, Centre d'essais d'engins spéciaux) for use by the French Army. In 1948, it was turned over to the French Air Force, who renamed it CIEES. Its remote location in the middle of the Saharan Desert and its relative closeness to the Equator (compared with Metropolitan France) made it an attractive launch site for missiles and orbital rockets.

== History ==
The origins of CIEES and the French missile and space program date to the end of the Second World War. On 12 June 1945, less than a month after V-E Day, the War Department ordered the study of self-propelled projectiles (rockets). On 13 August, the Directorate of Studies and Manufactures of Armaments (DEFA) proposed the creation of a Rocket Studies Center to continue studying and developing ballistic missiles. The Center aimed initially to attempt to reconstruct the V-2 rocket based on blueprints captured from V-2 launch sites in France. In November 1946, a mission arrived at Colomb-Béchar, French Algeria, to study the site's suitability as a missile range and launch facility. CIEES began operations at Colomb-Béchar six months later on 24 April 1947.

The Air Force built two launch pads at Colomb-Béchar: the small B0 pad for sounding rockets, and B1, completed in December 1949, for larger missiles. However, both of these launch sites were suitable only for smaller missiles, so a larger launch pad – dubbed CIEES B2 – was eventually built at Hammaguir, 120 kilometres (75 mi) southwest of Colomb-Béchar, in May 1952. CIEES B2 quickly expanded to include five launch pads: Bacchus, for solid fueled sounding rockets, Blandine, for liquid fueled sounding rockets, Beatrice, for testing the Hawk surface-to-air missile and the Cora and Europa rockets, Brigette/A, for the "precious stones" series of rockets, and CB, for the Monica sounding rocket.

After the Algerian War ceasefire in 1962, the 2nd Foreign Infantry Regiment was sent to the Colomb-Béchar region. Its main mission is to monitor the CIEES's sites. In 1967, the order to evacuate the site was given and the regiment was the last unit to leave the South for the French base of Mers-el-Kébir.

CIEES remained in use until 1 July 1967, when it was finally turned over to the government of newly independent Algeria. French withdrawal from the CIEES facility and other military bases in Algeria was stipulated by the 1962 Évian Accords that ended the Algerian War of Independence. Following CIEES's closure, French space launches were moved to the Kourou Space Center in French Guiana, while missile tests were moved to DGA Essais de missiles in the department of Landes in metropolitan France.

=== Directors of CIEES ===
The Director of CIEES was directly appointed by the Minister of the Armed Forces. They were required to also be the Commander of the Colomb-Béchar Airbase (see fr:Base aérienne 145 Colomb-Béchar) and Commander of military installations in the Sahara. The Director was required to be from the Air Force, and the Deputy Director was required to be from the Army. In order, CIEES was commanded by:

- Colonel Robert Aubinière
- Colonel Hériard
- Colonel Charbonneau
- General Millet
- General Y. Hautière

== Launches ==
As France's main launch site from 1947 to 1967, CIEES was responsible for all early milestones of the French space program. France's first successful rocket launch, of the Véronique sounding rocket, was from CIEES on 22 May 1952. France's first satellite, the Astérix-1, was launched from CIEES on a Diamant rocket on 26 November 1965. CIEES was also the launch site for France's first animal in space: a cat named Félicette, launched to an altitude of 157 kilometres (98 mi) on a Véronique rocket. She survived the flight, making her the only cat to do so.

Due to CIEES's long period of operation, it launched a wide variety of rockets and missiles. With regard to space launches, CIEES was most notable for launching the "precious stones" series of rockets, which included the Diamant, the first French rocket to put a satellite into orbit, and the first non-US or Soviet rocket to deliver a satellite to orbit. The "precious stones" rockets also included the Emeraude, Saphir, Rubis, Agate, and Topaze. Other notable spacecraft included the first tests of the Europa rocket, the first rocket of the European Launcher Development Organisation (the predecessor to the modern Pan-European European Space Agency) and France's first three geodetic satellites, the Diadem.

With regard to missiles, CIEES was the launch site for 1960s-era tests associated with the development of France's land-based medium-range ballistic missiles – the SBSS missile program – and submarine-launched ballistic missiles – the MSBS missile program. It also served as the launch site for testing a myriad of other sounding rockets and anti-aircraft missiles.

CIEES was also the initial launch site for the CT 10 drone, a target drone copy of the V-1 flying bomb that was widely used by the French and British militaries during the early days of the Cold War, as well as the 1950s-era R.511 air-to-air missile.

In total, 231 rockets and missiles were launched from CIEES's seven launch pads over its 20 years of operation.

=== Notable launches ===
Date of launch	Satellite	Payload mass	Carrier rocket	References
18 October 1963	Félicette (cat)	15 kilograms (33 lb)	Véronique	
26 November 1965	Astérix-1	40 kilograms (88 lb)	Diamant	
8 February 1967	Diadème-1	23 kilograms (51 lb)	Diamant	
15 February 1967	Diadème-2	23 kilograms (51 lb)	Diamant	

== Launch pads ==
Launch pads at Colomb-Béchar:

- B0 / CB – at 31°05′58″N 2°50′09″W; used for the Monica sounding rocket; first launch in February 1955
- B1 / Bou Hammadi – at 31°41′34″N 2°15′20″W; used for Centaure, Dragon and Veronique

Launch pads at Hammaguir:

- CIEES B2 – at 31°41′N 2°15′W; used for Veronique, Belier, Centaure, Centaure 1 and Dragon 1; first launch in May 1952
- Bacchus – at 30°50′59″N 3°04′09″W; used for solid fueled sounding rockets (VE 10 Aigle, Belier, Belier I, Agate, Centaure, Centaure 1, VE 111 Topaze, Dragon 1, VE 111L Topaze, Rubis); first launch in December 1960;
- Blandine – at 30°51′32″N 3°05′06″W; used for liquid fueled sounding rockets (Veronique, Veronique 61, Vesta, Veronique AGI, Veronique 61M); first launch in March 1959
- Beatrice – at 30°48′10″N 3°01′04″W; used for Hawk, Cora and Europa; first launch in November 1966
- Brigette – at 30°46′42″N 3°03′14″W; used for the "precious stones" series of rockets (VE 10A Aigle, VE 121 Emeraude, VE 231 Saphir, Rubis, Agate, Topaze, Diamant A, SSBS S112, MSBS M112); first launch in March 1963
- Brigette/A – at 30°52′N 3°01′W; used for Agate;

== See also ==
- Hammaguir
- CNES, the French space agency
- List of rocket launch sites
