= Diadème (satellites) =

Pair of French artificial satellites

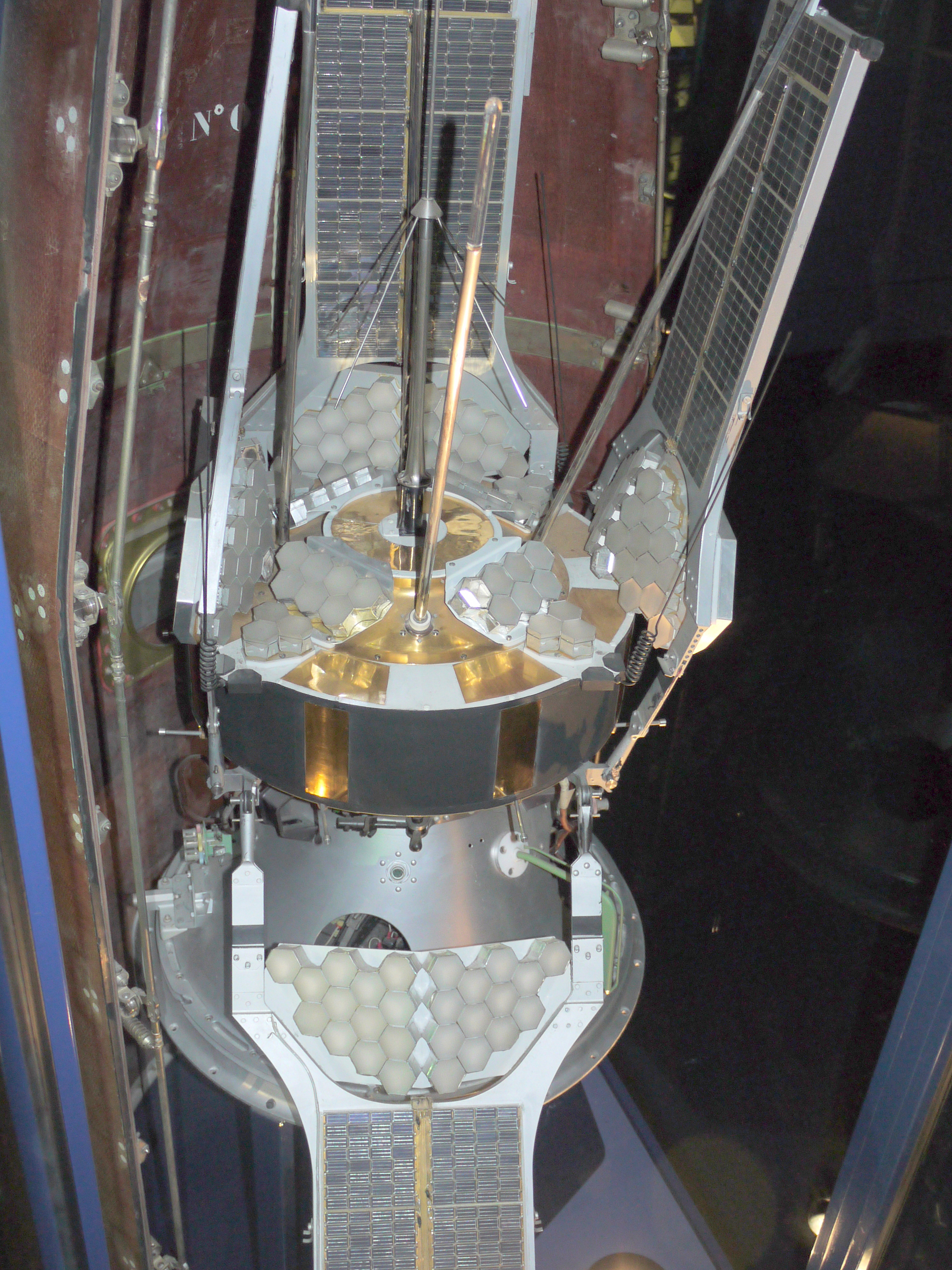
Diadème satellite model, Museum of Air and Space, Paris, Le Bourget

Diadème is the name of a pair of French artificial satellites of the D-1 series developed by CNES and built by Matra, launched in February 1967 using Diamant rockets. Like the first satellite of the Diapason series (D-1A), the purpose of Diadème 1 and 2 was to carry out geodetic surveys using Doppler and laser telemetry techniques. They were also used to test a satellite navigation system.

== Characteristics ==
Both satellites had a mass of about 23 kg. In addition to the Doppler oscillator and laser reflectors, the satellites also carried a radio beacon operating at 136 MHz for the transmission of telemetry data. It was also equipped with a "solar cell" experiment, where the battery was recharged by a solar generator.

The satellites were stabilized relative to the Earth's magnetic field, with the satellite's axis tangent to the lines of force. Initially only three French tracking stations, all around the Mediterranean, tracked the satellites. Later a worldwide tracking programme was established, involving two American tracking stations.

== Satellites ==
Both satellites were launched by a Diamant-A from CIEES in Hammaguir, Algeria:

- Diadème 1, launched on 8 February 1967, failed on 2 January 1970, although it could be tracked by laser until June 1971;
- Diadème 2, launched on 15 February 1967, ceased operations on 5 April of that year, although it was followed by laser until July 1971.
