= Rubis (rocket) =

French two-stage rocket

Rubis (VE 210)
- A diagram of the Rubis rocket
- Manufacturer: SEREB
- Country of origin: France

Size
- Height: 9.60 metres (31.5 ft)
- Diameter: 0.80 metres (2 ft 7 in)
- Mass: 4,000 kilograms (8,800 lb)
- Stages: 2

Associated rockets
- Family: Pierres Précieuses ("Precious Stones")
- Derivative work: Diamant

Launch history
- Status: Retired
- Launch sites: CIEES/DGA Essais de missiles
- Total launches: 10
- First flight: 10 June 1964
- Last flight: 5 July 1967

First stage – NA801
- Powered by: NA801 Mammouth
- Maximum thrust: 190.00 kilonewtons (42,710 lb_{f})
- Burn time: 18 seconds
- Propellant: solid

Second stage – P6
- Powered by: P064
- Maximum thrust: 29.40 kilonewtons (6,610 lb_{f})
- Specific impulse: 211 seconds
- Burn time: 45 seconds
- Propellant: solid

The VE 210 Rubis (French, meaning ruby) was a French two-stage rocket.

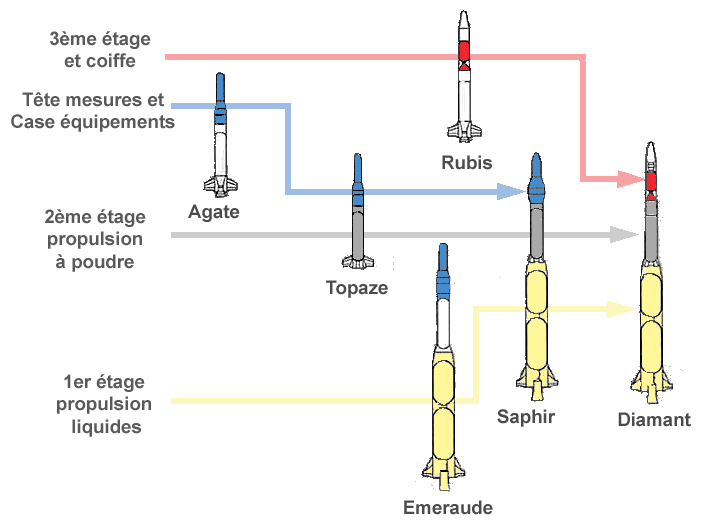
Military space program pierres précieuses (fr.: gemstones) that included the five prototypes Agathe, Topaze, Emeraude, Rubis and Saphir.

It was part of the pierres précieuses (fr.: gemstones) program, that included five prototypes Agathe, Topaze, Emeraude, Rubis and Saphir, leading up to the Diamant orbital rocket.

Its codename, VE210, indicates that it is a "Véhicule Expérimental" (Experimental Vehicle) with 2 stages, using solid propellant (code 1), and not guided (code 0).

The rocket was used to test technologies used in the Diamant, as well as to launch scientific instruments from the Paris Observatory and Max Planck Institute.

== Description ==
Rubis used an NA801 Mammouth engine (similar to Agate) for its first stage and a P064 engine for its second stage. The Rubis has a maximum altitude of 2,000 kilometers, a takeoff thrust of 186 kN, a diameter of 0.80 metres (2.6 ft) and a length of 9.60 metres (31.5 ft).

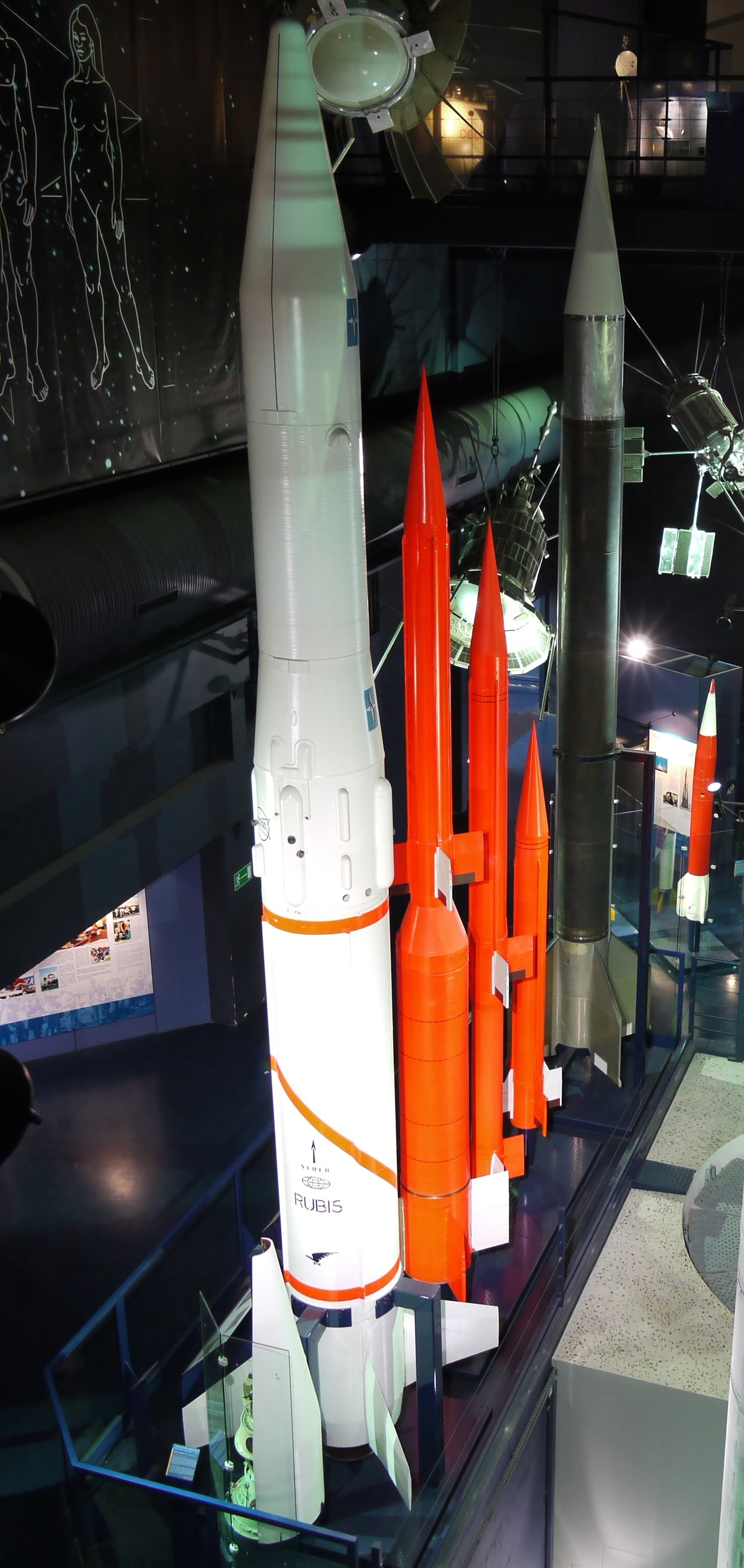
Rubis at the front left

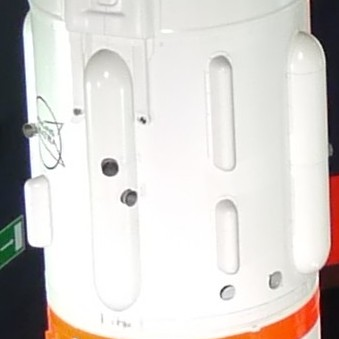
Rubis equipment bay

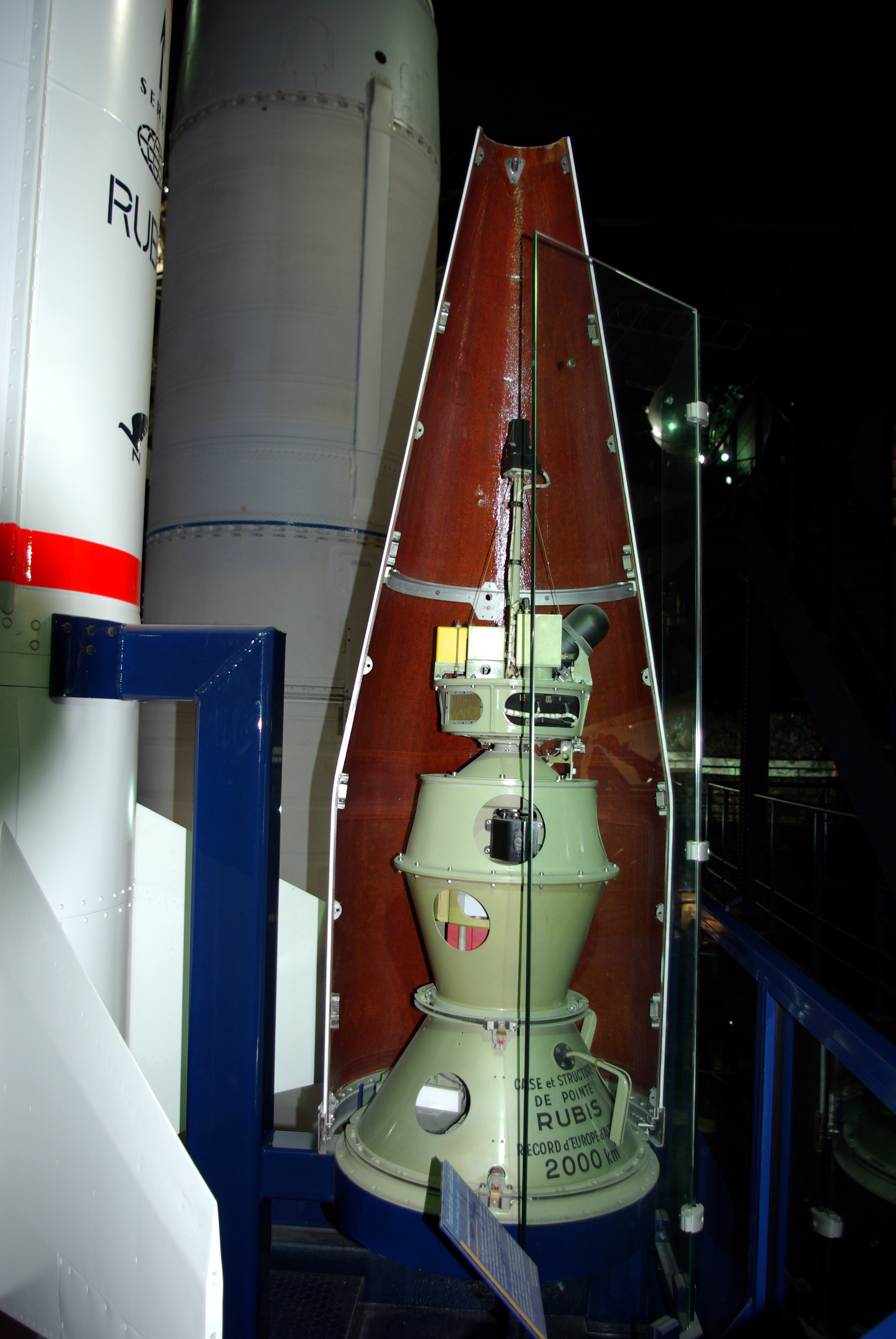
Rubis payload

== Launches ==
The Rubis was launched eleven times from 10 June 1964 to 5 July 1967. All Rubis rockets were launched from CIEES at Hammaguir, French Algeria, with the exception of the last launch, which took place from DGA Essais de missiles, Biscarosse.

| Number | Date | Result | Launch site | Payload |
|---|---|---|---|---|
| 1 | 10 Jun 1964 | Success | CIEES | Research flight |
| 2 | 12 Jun 1964 | Success | CIEES | Research flight |
| 3 | 12 Oct 1964 | Stage separation failure | CIEES | Research flight |
| 4 | 18 Dec 1964 | Stage separation failure | CIEES | Research flight |
| 5 | 31 May 1965 | Success | CIEES | A-1 capsule 1 (Asterix prototype) |
| 6 | 3 Jun 1965 | Success | CIEES | A-1 capsule 2 (Asterix prototype) |
| 7 | 5 Jun 1965 | Success | CIEES | Rubis 01/D-1 |
| 8 | 30 Sep 1965 | Success | CIEES | Rubis 02 |
| 9 | 22 Apr 1966 | Success | CIEES | Rubis 03/MPE Ba-17 |
| 10 | 5 Jul 1967 | Success | DGA Essais de missiles | Rubis 04 |
