= Vesta (rocket) =

1960s French sounding rocket

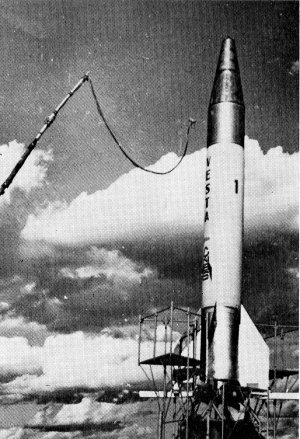
- Vesta 1
- Country of origin: France

Size
- Height: 10.2 m
- Diameter: 1 m
- Mass: 5.1 tons
- Stages: 1

Capacity

Launch history
- Launch sites: CIEES, Guiana Space Centre

First stage
- Thrust: 160 kN

The Vesta sounding rocket, conceived in 1962 by the Laboratoire de Recherches Balistiques et Aérodynamiques (LRBA), a specialized French Army research facility focused on liquid-propelled rocket development. The initial letter "V" in its name is derived from the city of Vernon.

It was the outcome of an initiative by CNES with the purpose of enabling transportation of more substantial experiments to greater altitudes than the Véronique sounding rocket, also created by the LRBA and in active service at the time.

== Technical details ==
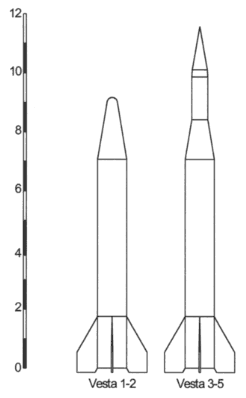
Vesta rockets

Operated by a 160 kN thrust engine using a combination of nitric acid and turpentine as propellants, the Vesta rocket was 10.2 meters tall with a diameter of 1 meter. Weighing 5.1 tons excluding its payload, Vesta had the capability to send a 500 kg to an altitude of 400 km.

== Launches ==
Between 1965 and 1969 a total of five Vesta rockets were launched. These launches took place from both CIEES and Kourou. The first two launches primarily served as validation tests for the rocket's operation, whereas the subsequent three carried out scientific experiments.

A pig-tailed macaque named Martine was launched on March 7, 1967, and another named Pierette on March 13. These suborbital flights reached 243 km (151 mi) and 234 km (145 mi), respectively. Martine became the first monkey to survive more than a couple of hours after flying above the international definition of the edge of space. (Ham and Enos, launched earlier by the United States, were chimpanzees).

Vesta launches
Date	Site	Vehicle	Mission	Apogee	Results
15 October 1965	CIEES	Vesta 01	FU123 Technology	187 km	Success
25 October 1965	CIEES	Vesta 03	FU123 Technology	109 km	Partial success
7 March 1967	CIEES	Vesta 04	FU147 Biology	243 km	Success
13 March 1967	CIEES	Vesta 05	FU147 Biology	234 km	Success
8 November 1969	Kourou	Vesta 02	FU189 Astronomy	204 km	Partial success

== See also ==
- French space program
- Véronique
- Diamant
