= Aigle (rocket) =

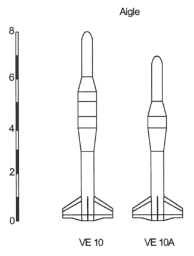
SEREB Aigle rockets

Aigle (French for eagle) was a French experimental rocket launched several times between 1960 and 1964 from CIEES Hammaguira. Two versions where developed: the VE 10 and the VE 10A.

The VE 10 was fin-stabilized and propelled by a Stromboli SEPR 737 with 984 kilograms of Plastolite solid fuel. Measuring 55 cm in diameter, it could propel 360 kilograms of payload to an altitude of up to 6 kilometers. It was launched four times between 1960 and 1961.

The VE 10A used an updated version of the Stromboli booster. It was launched two times between 1963 and 1964.

With the addition of an extra booster, the Aigle it became the Éridan rocket.

== Launches ==
The Aigle was launched six times between 1960 and 1964 from CIEES Hammaguira.

Aigle launches
Date	Version	Pad
1960 December 17	VE 10	Hammaguira Bacchus
1960 December 19	VE 10	Hammaguira Bacchus
1961 March 16	VE 10	Hammaguira Bacchus
1961 March 21	VE 10	Hammaguira Bacchus
1963 March 5	VE 10A	Hammaguira Brigitte
1964 November 2	VE 10A	Hammaguira Brigitte
