= Robert Aubinière =

French military and government official (1912–2001)

Robert Aubinière.

Robert Joseph Aubinière Lippmann (September 24, 1912 – December 5, 2001) was a French military official and the inaugural director of the French Space Agency (CNES).

== Biography ==
=== Early life ===
Aubinière was born in Paris and spent most of his schooling at the Lycée Condorcet. He did his hypotaupe at Condorcet and his taupe at Lycée Chaptal then at Lycée Louis-le-Grand. Robert Aubinière entered the École polytechnique in 1933.

=== Military career ===
After graduating from the École polytechnique in 1935, Aubinière joined the French Air Force as a lieutenant. Upon completing his training at the École de l'air et de l'espace, he was assigned to the 61st Wing, stationed in Blida, in October 1936. In September 1943, he left Algeria for London, where he was named head of air operations for northern France (Region A). In December 1943, he parachuted into Is-sur-Tille in Burgundy and later operated secretly in Lille as head of the air operations office (BOA), succeeding Pierre Deshayes. He helped coordinate the logistics of the Tortue plan, aimed at delaying German tanks ahead of the Allied landings. In February 1944, he joined the special services department. On April 14, 1944, he was arrested by the Gestapo in Lille, deported to Germany in September, and interned at a V2 factory in Neubrandenburg. He returned to France in May 1945.

By September 1945, Aubinière was second in command at the École de l'air et de l'espace, first in Paris and later in Salon-de-Provence. In January 1949, he entered the École de guerre, graduating in April 1950, and was then posted as chief of staff for the 5th Air Region in French North Africa. Promoted to colonel in 1952, he became commander of the 721 Rochefort air base, a training center for non-commissioned mechanical officers, in May 1954.

On September 7, 1957, he was appointed director of the Centre interarmées d'essais d'engins spéciaux (CIEES, English: Joint Special Equipment Testing Center) in Colomb-Béchar. On January 10, 1960, he became director of the École de l'air et de l'espace and commander of the 701 Salon-de-Provence air base. On April 4, 1960, he was named technical and industrial director of Aeronautics at the Ministère de l'Air (English: Ministry of Air). He was promoted to air brigadier general in December, 1958, and to air divisional general in June, 1961.

=== Civilian career ===
In 1962, Aubinière was appointed director general of the brand newly established the French Space Agency (CNES), and he stayed in the position until 1972. From 1972 to 1975, he was appointed Secretary General of the European Launcher Development Organisation.

== Honors ==
Aubinière received numerous honors including the Grand-Croix of the Legion d’Honneur the Croix de Guerre, the Order of Merit, the Aeronautical Medal, the 1939–1945 Commemorative war medal, and the North Africa Security and Order Operations Commemorative Medal. He's also an honorary member of the Académie de l'air et de l'espace in France.
