= Astérix (satellite) =

First French satellite

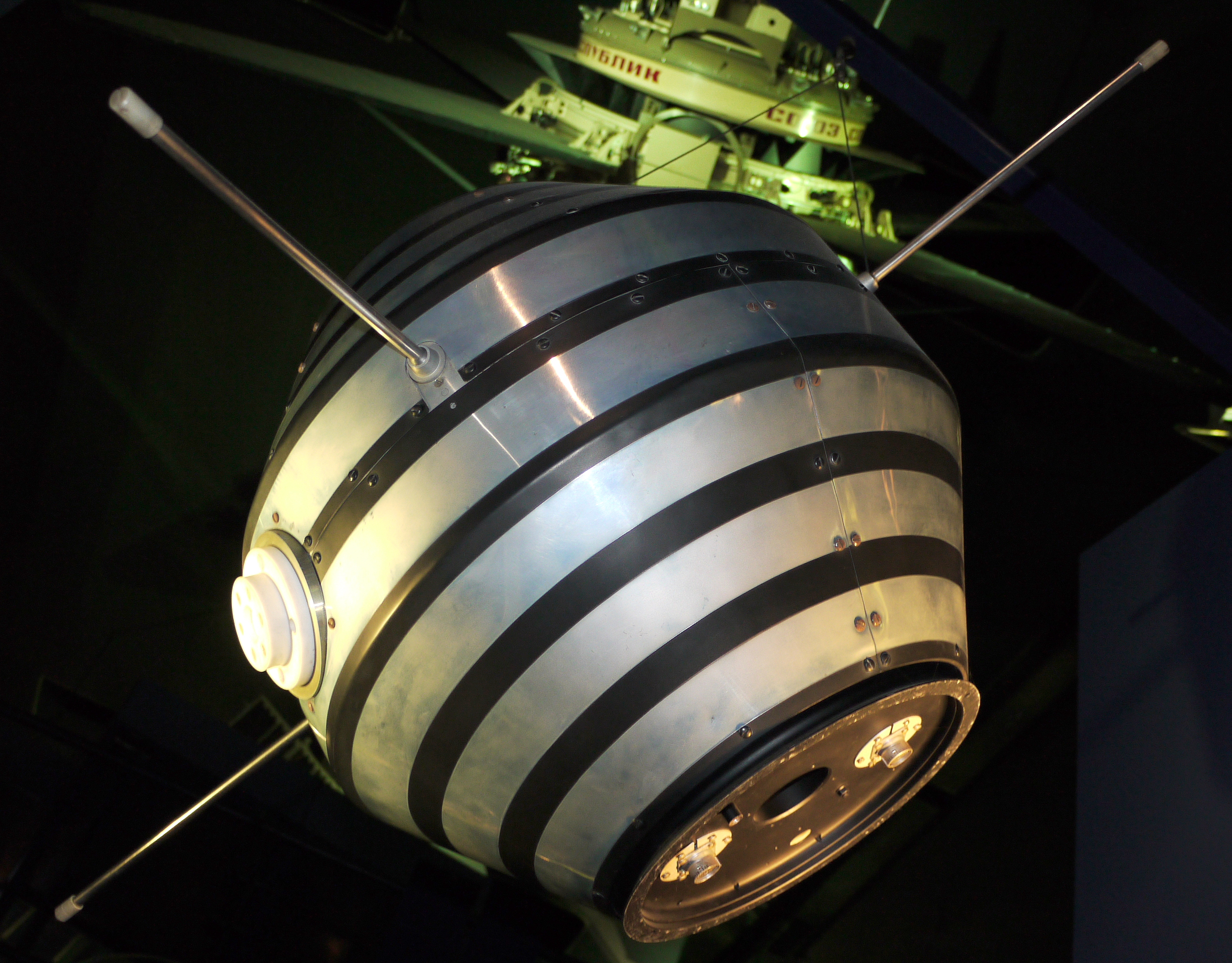
- Prototype of Astérix at the Musée de l'air et de l'espace
- Mission type: Technology
- Operator: CNES, CNET
- Harvard designation: 1965-096A
- COSPAR ID: 1965-096A
- SATCAT no.: 1778
- Mission duration: 111 days

Spacecraft properties
- Manufacturer: CNES
- Launch mass: 42.0 kilograms (92.6 lb)

Start of mission
- Launch date: 26 November 1965, 09:52 UTC
- Rocket: Diamant A
- Launch site: Hammaguir Brigitte/A

End of mission
- Disposal: Decommissioned
- Last contact: 28 November 1965

Orbital parameters
- Reference system: Geocentric
- Regime: Low Earth
- Semi-major axis: 7,468.0 kilometres (4,640.4 mi)
- Eccentricity: 0.08023
- Perigee altitude: 527 kilometres (327 mi)
- Apogee altitude: 1,697 kilometres (1,054 mi)
- Inclination: 34.30 degrees
- Period: 107.5 minutes
- Epoch: 26 November 1965

Astérix or A-1 (initially conceptualized as FR.2 or FR-2) is the first French satellite. It was launched on 26 November 1965 by a Diamant A rocket from the CIEES launch site at Hammaguir, Algeria. With Astérix, France became the sixth country to have an artificial satellite and the third country to launch a satellite on its own rocket. Its main purpose was to test the Diamant launcher, though it was also designed to study the ionosphere. Astérix continues to orbit Earth as of 2026 and is expected to remain in orbit for centuries.

== Background ==
The French space agencies Centre national d'études spatiales (CNES) and Centre national d'études des télécommunications (CNET) were developing Astérix concurrent with FR-1, another satellite, as early as 1963. FR-1 was the first step of an ambitious French plan to launch six FR-series satellites, each meant to study a different aspect of the Earth's atmosphere. FR-1 was generally designed to study the Earth's magnetic and electric fields in the ionosphere and magnetosphere. Astérix, ultimately France's first satellite, was initially conceptualized as the second FR satellite under the name FR-2. Like FR-1, FR-2 would study the ionosphere. FR-3 was to be a "scaled-up" version of FR-2, with FR-4 to carry instruments measuring hydrogen distribution in the upper atmosphere, FR-5 to study "magnetic impulses" and serve as a platform for future research, and FR-6 to be a solar-stabilized spacecraft with final payload to be determined based on experimental results from its antecedents.

Initial plans called for a late 1964 or early 1965 launch of FR-1, with Astérix's launch scheduled for early 1965. It appears Astérix was put into orbit prior to FR-1 because Charles de Gaulle and CNES wanted France to become the third space power by launching an independently-developed satellite on a French launcher, a propaganda coup for French exceptionalism during the Cold War.

== Spacecraft design ==
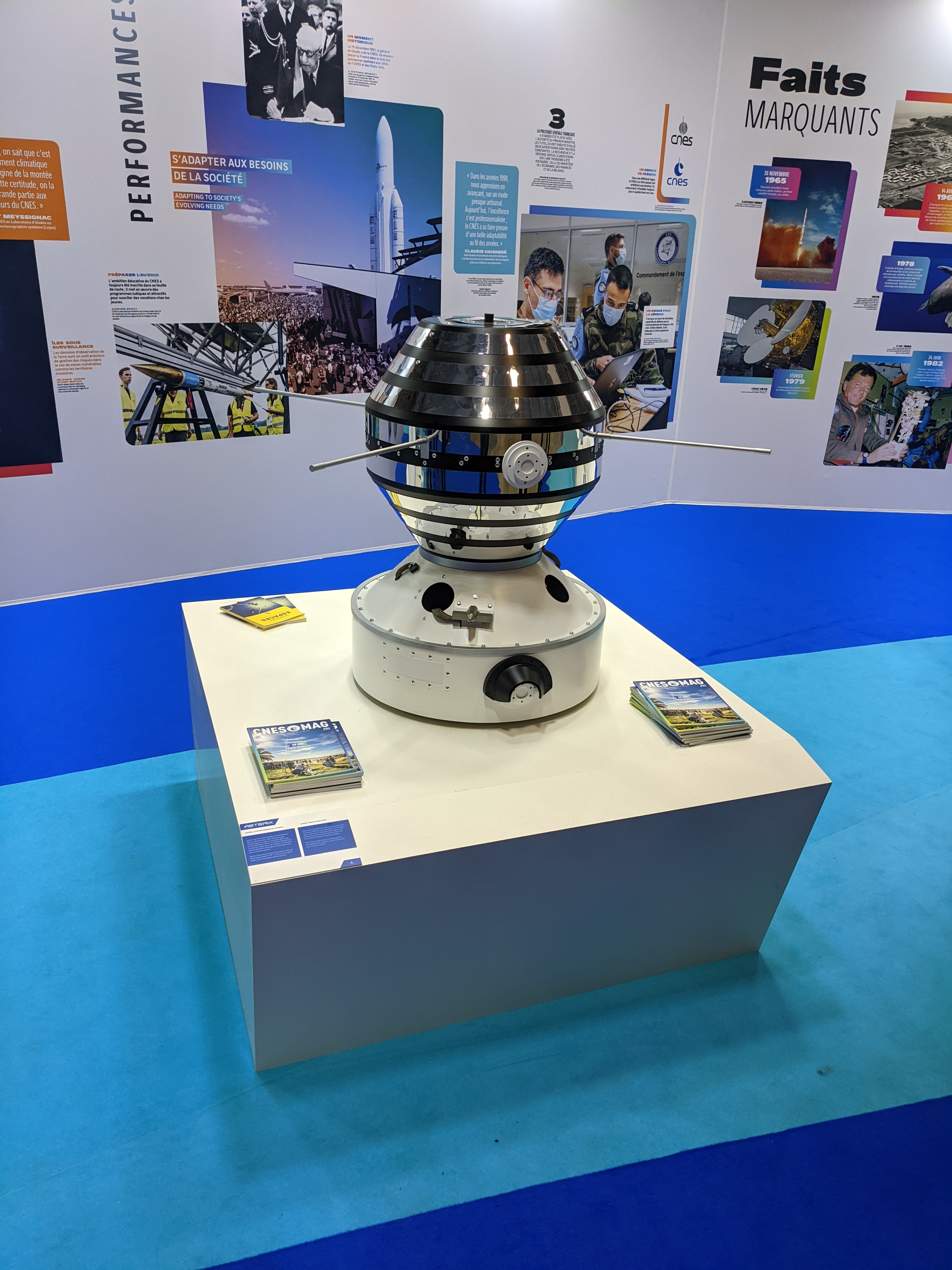
Model of the Asterix

France managed to design, construct, and launch Astérix and FR-1 relatively quickly thanks to three related factors: postwar knowledge gained from Nazi scientists and their work on the V-2 rocket; France's independent development of nuclear IRBM launchers including the Saphir rocket, a precursor to Diamant; and France's collaborative civilian research with the United States (through NASA) and other European countries (through CERN and ESRO).

Measuring approximately 55 centimetres (22 in) in diameter and 55 centimetres high, Astérix's exterior casing is made of fiberglass and resembles a top. Its black stripes purportedly provide passive solar gain. Equipped with accelerometers measuring vertical and horizontal movement and angular velocity, a radio beacon, radar transponder, thermometer, and telemetry transmitters, the satellite was designed to report its position back to Earth. It is unclear whether Astérix was capable of making ionospheric measurements as originally planned.

The satellite was originally designated A-1, as the French Army's first satellite, but later renamed by the press after popular French comics character Astérix. The names Zébulon and Zebby, after another cartoon character from the French children's television program Le Manège enchanté, were also considered.

=== Specifications ===
- Weight: 42.0 kilograms (92.6 lb)
- Perigee: 527 kilometres (327 mi)
- Apogee: 1,697 kilometres (1,054 mi)
- Inclination: 34.3 degrees
- Orbital period: 107.5 minutes

== Mission and results ==
France carried out two suborbital Astérix prototype flights on 31 May and 3 June 1965 using Rubis rockets from the CIEES launch complex Bacchus at Hammaguir, Algeria.

Astérix was launched on 26 November 1965 by a Diamant A rocket from the CIEES launch complex Brigitte/A at Hammaguir. The Diamant launcher measured 19 metres (62 ft) tall and weighed 18 tonnes (18 long tons; 20 short tons), and was filled with a mix of turpentine and nitric acid fuel. The payload fairing ejected from the rocket ten minutes after launch, during which the satellite's telemetry equipment was damaged. Depending on the source, due to this damage Astérix either failed to transmit any signals, or stopped transmitting them after two days or 111 days. Nevertheless, American radar scans confirmed the satellite successfully entered orbit.

== Legacy and status ==
With Astérix, France became the sixth country to have an artificial satellite in orbit after the USSR (Sputnik 1, 1957), the United States (Explorer 1, 1958), the United Kingdom (Ariel 1, 1962), Canada (Alouette 1, 1962), and Italy (San Marco 1, 1964). France also became the third country after the USSR and US to launch a satellite on its own rocket: the British, Canadian, and Italian satellites were launched on American rockets.

Astérix remains in orbit as of 2024. Due to the relatively high altitude of its orbit, it is not expected to re-enter Earth's atmosphere for several centuries.

The Musée de l'air et de l'espace in Paris Le Bourget displays a prototype of the satellite, while the Cité de l'espace in Toulouse displays a replica.

== See also ==
- FR-1 (satellite)
- French space program
- Timeline of artificial satellites and space probes
