= Diamant =

French small-lift launch vehicle

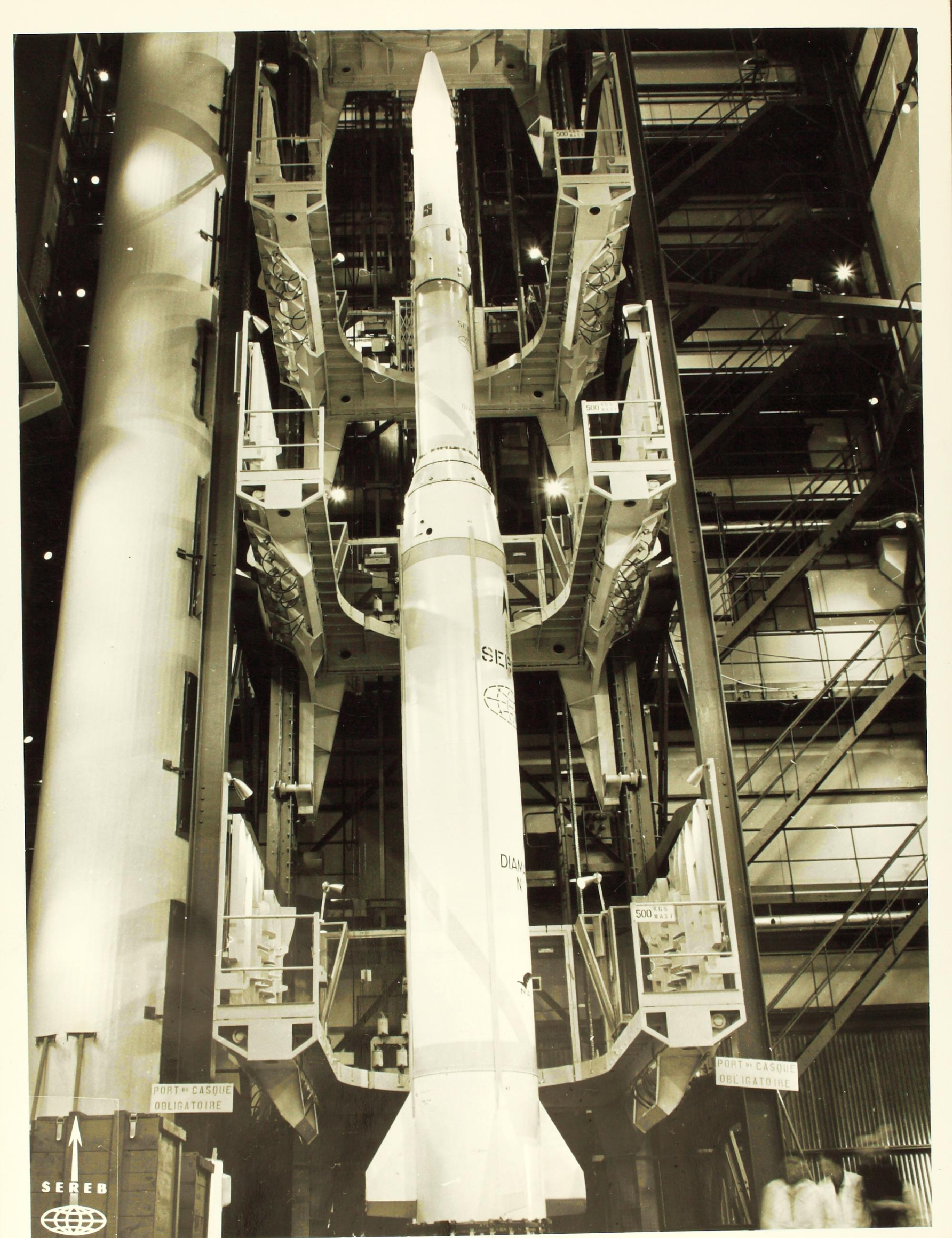
- Diamant A
- Function: Small launch vehicle
- Manufacturer: SEREB
- Country of origin: France

Size
- Height: A: 18.95 m (62.2 ft); B: 23.5 m (77 ft); BP4: 21.6 m (71 ft)
- Diameter: 1.34 m (4 ft 5 in)
- Mass: 18,400 kg (40,600 lb)
- Stages: 3

Capacity

Payload to LEO
- Mass: 160 kg (350 lb)

Launch history
- Status: Retired
- Launch sites: A: Hammaguir; B/BP4: Guiana
- Total launches: 12 (A:4, B: 5, BP4: 3)
- Success(es): 9 (A: 3, B: 3, BP4: 3)
- Failure(s): 2 (B)
- Partial failure(s): 1 (A)
- First flight: A: 26 November 1965; B: 10 March 1970; BP4: 6 February 1975
- Last flight: A: 15 February 1967; B: 21 May 1973; BP4: 27 September 1975

First stage (Diamant A) – Emeraude
- Powered by: 1 Vexin B
- Maximum thrust: 301.55 kN (67,790 lb_{f})
- Specific impulse: 203 s (1.99 km/s)
- Burn time: 93 seconds
- Propellant: HNO_{3} / C_{10}H_{16}

First stage (Diamant B/BP4) – Améthyste
- Powered by: 1 Valois
- Maximum thrust: 396.52 kN (89,140 lb_{f})
- Specific impulse: 221 s (2.17 km/s)
- Burn time: 110 seconds
- Propellant: N_{2}O_{4} / UDMH

Second stage (Diamant A/B) – Topaze
- Powered by: 1 P2.2
- Maximum thrust: 120.082 kN (26,996 lb_{f})
- Specific impulse: 255 s (2.50 km/s)
- Burn time: 39 seconds
- Propellant: Solid

Second stage (Diamant BP4) – P-4/Rita
- Maximum thrust: 176 kN (40,000 lb_{f})
- Specific impulse: 273 s (2.68 km/s)
- Burn time: 55 seconds
- Propellant: Solid

Third stage (Diamant A) – Rubis
- Powered by: 1 P-064
- Maximum thrust: 29.4 kN (6,600 lb_{f})
- Specific impulse: 211 s (2.07 km/s)
- Burn time: 39 seconds
- Propellant: Solid

Third stage (Diamant B/BP4) – P-068
- Maximum thrust: 50 kN (11,000 lb_{f})
- Specific impulse: 211 s (2.07 km/s)
- Burn time: 46 seconds
- Propellant: Solid

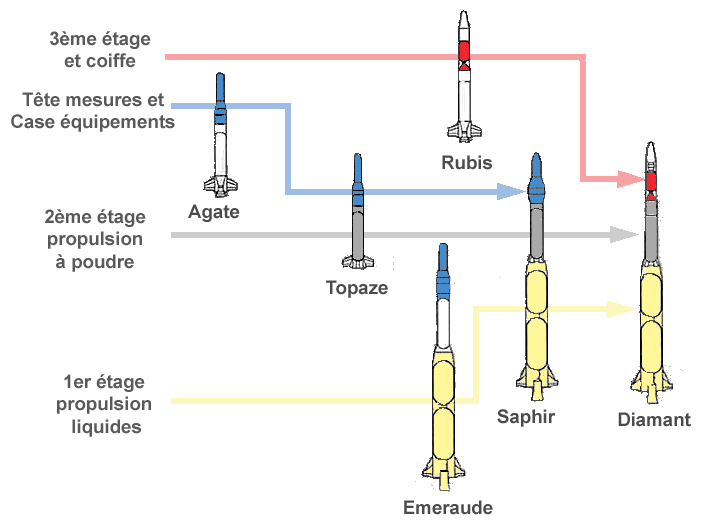
Military space program French: pierres précieuses (fr.: gemstones) that included the five prototypes Agathe, Topaze, Emeraude, Rubis and Saphir.

The Diamant rocket (French for 'diamond') was the first exclusively French expendable launch system and at the same time the first satellite launcher not built by either the United States or USSR. As such, it has been referred to as being a key predecessor for all subsequent European launcher projects. The head of the project, Charley Attali, received the Legion of Honour in 1965 for the Diamant.

During 1962, development of the Diamant commenced as the inaugural spacecraft project of France's space agency, the Centre National d'Études Spatiales (CNES). As a project, it was derived from the military program pierres précieuses (lit. 'gemstones') that included the five prototypes Agate, Topaze, Emeraude, Rubis and Saphir (Agate, Topaz, Emerald, Ruby and Sapphire), and drew heavily upon the knowledge and technologies that had been previously developed. On 26 November 1965, the Diamant A performed its maiden flight. Out of a total of 12 launch attempts to be performed between 1965 and 1975, 9 of these were successful. Most notably, on 26 November 1965, the Diamant was used to successfully launch the first French satellite, named Astérix.

Three successive versions of the Diamant rocket were developed, designated A, B and BP4. All versions had three stages and a payload of approximately 150 kg for a 200 km orbit. Despite the success of the Diamant as a launcher, France ultimately chose to terminate further work on its national launcher program in favour of participation in the multi-European programme to produce what would become the Ariane launcher in 1975.

== Development ==
=== Background ===
During the late 1940s and 1950s, substantial interest arose amongst the international powers of the era in the development of rocketry and missile technology, in particular the prospects for ballistic missiles capable of travelling great distances. Both of the emergent superpowers of the time, the United States and the Union of Soviet Socialist Republics (USSR) chose to invest heavily within this new field, observing its political and military importance; it was not long before a highly competitive atmosphere emerged where neither entity wished to fall behind the other in missile technology, which directly led to the so-called 'space race'. In addition, other nations also sought to make headway with this technology, often seeking to exploit and build upon knowledge which had been acquired from Nazi Germany's V2 programme. In western Europe, both the United Kingdom and France began making significant early steps in this field.

While Britain forged ahead with programmes such as the Black Knight ballistic missile demonstrator and the military-orientated Blue Steel missile programme, France also made progress on its own efforts. During 1949, the French government established the Laboratoire de Recherches Balistiques et Aérodynamiques at Vernon, outside Paris, for the purpose of pursuing its own military-focused ballistic missiles programmes. The agency initially conducted relatively straightforward and cost-conscious programmes, such as the development of the V2-based Veronique liquid-fuelled rocket in cooperation with a number of German scientists, which first flew during 1954. During 1957, having been suitably encouraged by the progress made, the Comité d'Action Scientifique de Défense Nationale (CASDN) decided to finance further refinements of the Veronique rocket.

During 1958, French wartime military leader Charles de Gaulle became President of France, establishing the Fifth Republic. De Gaulle, who was openly keen to develop a capable and fully independent French nuclear deterrent, determined that French-built missiles could comprise a potent element of the French military's fledgling nuclear arsenal, known as the Force de frappe; further impetus in favour of missile development was generated by the Sputnik crisis, a fear that other powers were falling behind the Soviet Union's progress in missile development, which had been provoked by the USSR's success with Sputnik 1, the first man-made satellite to be successfully orbited. A greatly expanded and renewed framework for missile-related development was promptly issued alongside generous government support for scientific research; specifically, the new efforts covered technologies such as intermediate-range ballistic missiles (IRBMs), submarine-launched ballistic missile, and reconnaissance satellites.

=== Emergence and success ===
During 1959, the French government established the Comité de Recherches Spatiales (CRS), which would later be renamed as the Centre National d'Études Spatiales (CNES). The newly formed CRS, initially chaired by the French physicist Pierre Auger, was tasked with the coordination of all French research efforts in the field of space. From an early stage, the organisation's primary goal was to pursue the development of an indigenous expendable launch system with which payloads, such as satellites, could be launched into orbit. The indigenous launcher, which was promptly named Diamant, drew heavily from the military ballistic missile programmes which had preceded it; as such, much of the rocket's design was based upon these early missiles.

On 26 November 1965, the first Diamant rocket was fired from its launch site, the CIEES testing range, at Hammaguir, Béchar Province, Algeria. This maiden flight was deemed to be a success, achieving sufficient altitude and launching French's first satellite, a 42 kg test vehicle known as Astérix, into orbit; this feat has been viewed as cementing France as the third space power in the world, as well as affirming its independence and strategic capabilities. During 1966 and 1967, Diamant was used to launch three French-built scientific satellites. On 9 April 1968, the Guiana Space Centre, France's new national launching complex at Kourou, French Guiana, was officially declared to be operational; Diamant launches were subsequently shifted to this facility, along with various other missiles in use by France and, later on, other European nations as well.

On 10 March 1970, the first Diamant B rocket, an improved model of the launcher, was fired, carrying a pair of scientific satellites, named DIAL/MIKA and DIAL/WIKA, into orbit. Only one of the two satellites, which had been produced as a collaborative effort between France and Germany to study the Van Allen radiation belt around the Earth, survived the launch process. Overall, the Diamant rocket came to be recognised as a successful and reliable launch vehicle, competitive amongst even the best of its international competitors throughout the world during its time.

=== Successor and discontinuation ===
While Diamant had proven to be a viable and reliable launcher, the sheer size of the American and Soviet space programmes far exceeded what would be realistically achievable not only by France but by any of the independent nations of western Europe. As this realisation became prevalent, it was also recognised that cooperative efforts between nations and a new generation of international programmes would enable these nations to play a much greater and significant role in space exploration. Early collaborative programmes, such as the European Launcher Development Organisation (ELDO) and European Space Research Organisation (ESRO), bore mixed results but showed the promise of such endeavours, thus a greater emphasis was placed upon international efforts on the topic of space.

As a consequence of Britain's withdrawal from participation in the ELDO, it was decided to replace the British-built Blue Streak, which comprised the first stage of the organisation's multinational launcher, known as Europa, with the French-built Diamant taking its place. All work on the Europa programme was terminated only a few years later due to the high failure rate encountered. Meanwhile, Britain decided to focus its efforts on the indigenous Black Arrow launcher instead.

During 1974, the European Space Agency (ESA) was founded for this purpose; the ESA effectively enabled the competing and overlapping national space programmes to be succeeded by a single organised multinational framework with work shared between the member states instead. Specifically, in 1976, work commenced on the new collaborative Ariane 1 launcher, the first version of what would become the highly successful Ariane family. The existence of the Ariane programme, a rival launcher to the earlier Diamant rocket, effectively replaced the demand for and the role of France's indigenous launcher, rendering it obsolete and redundant in comparison. France ultimately decided to discontinue further launches using Diamant in favour of the newer Ariane platform.

== Variants ==
=== Diamant A ===
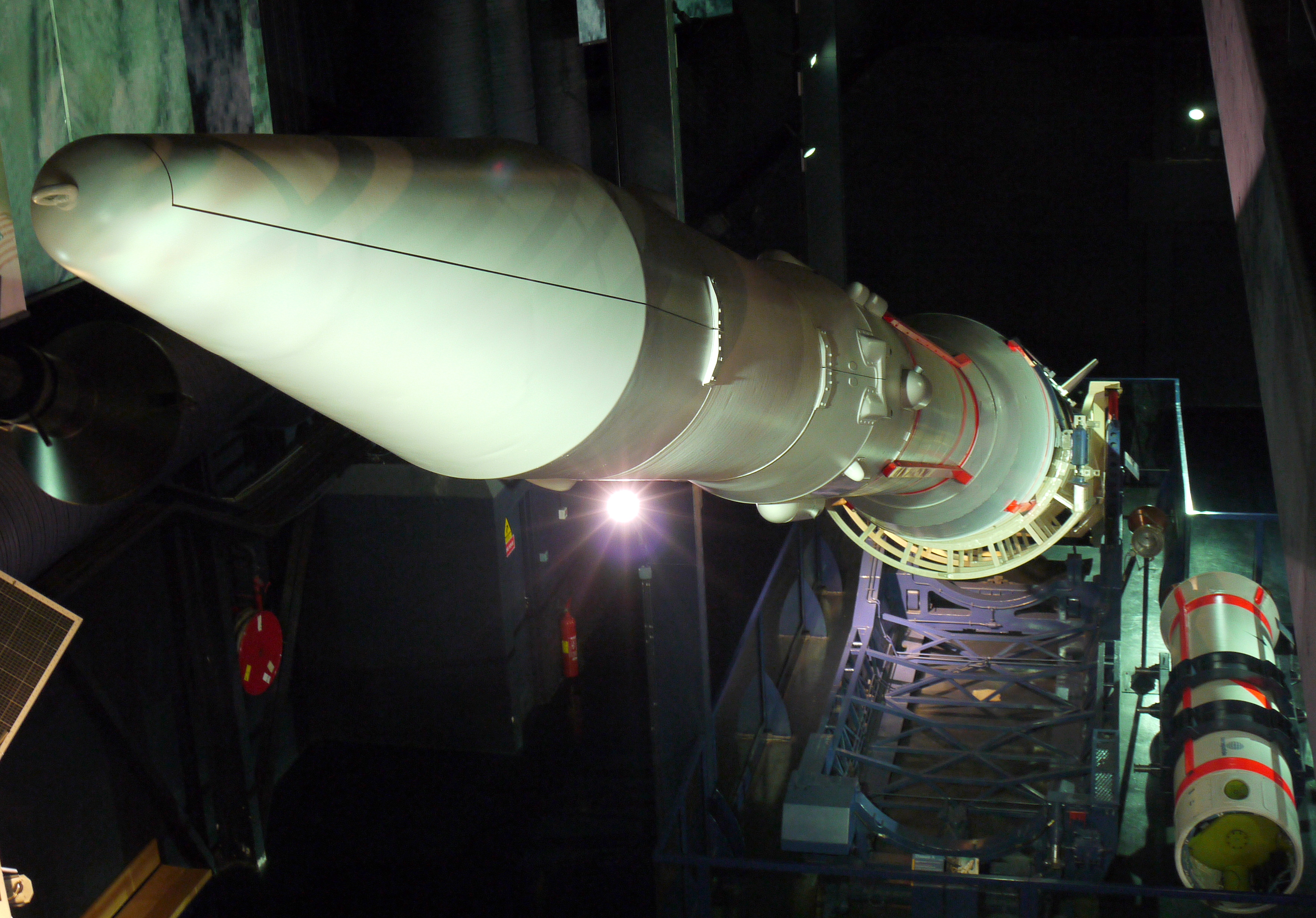
Diamant A seen from the fairing in Musée de l'Air

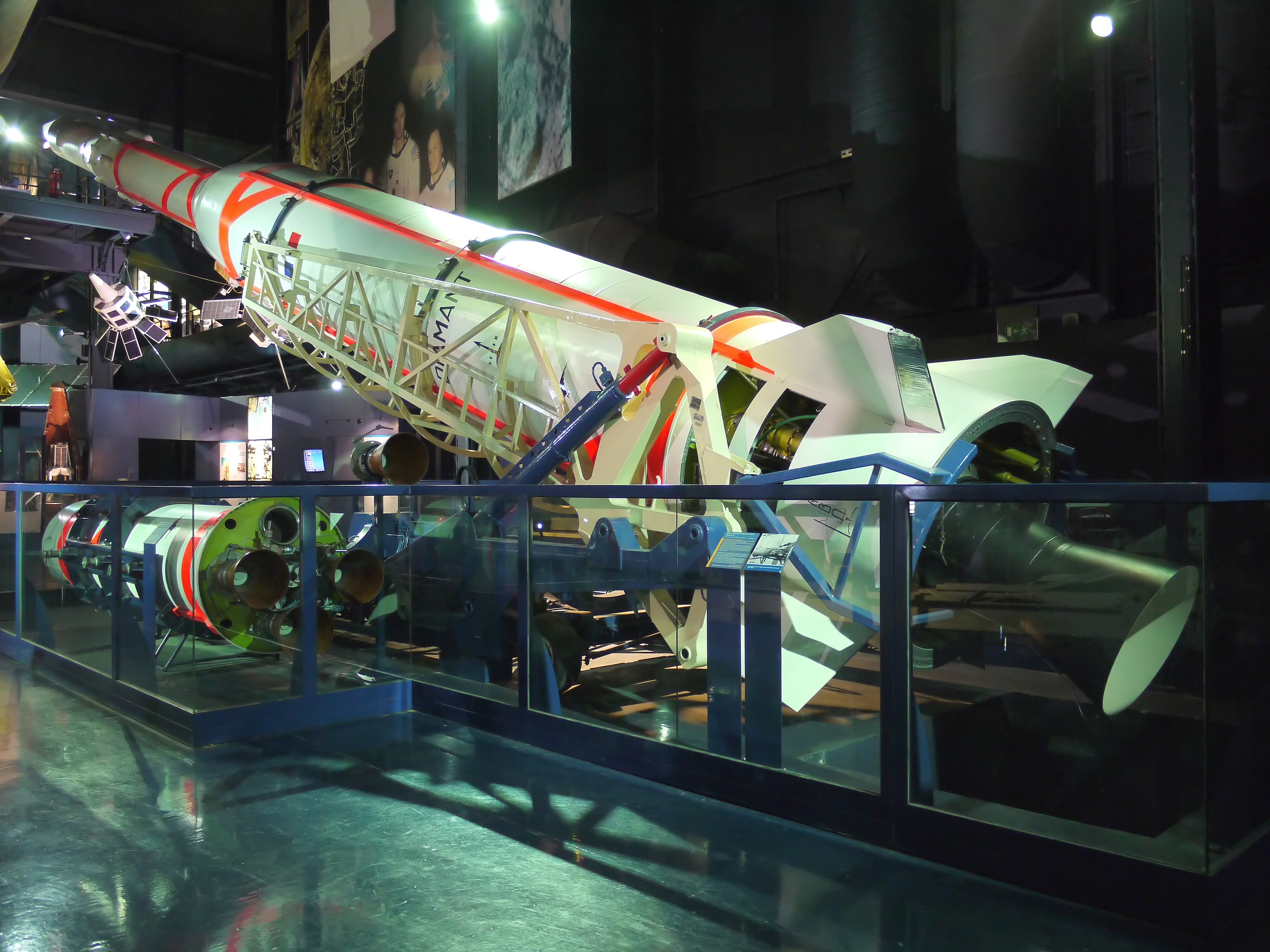
Diamant A seen from the rear end in Musée de l'Air

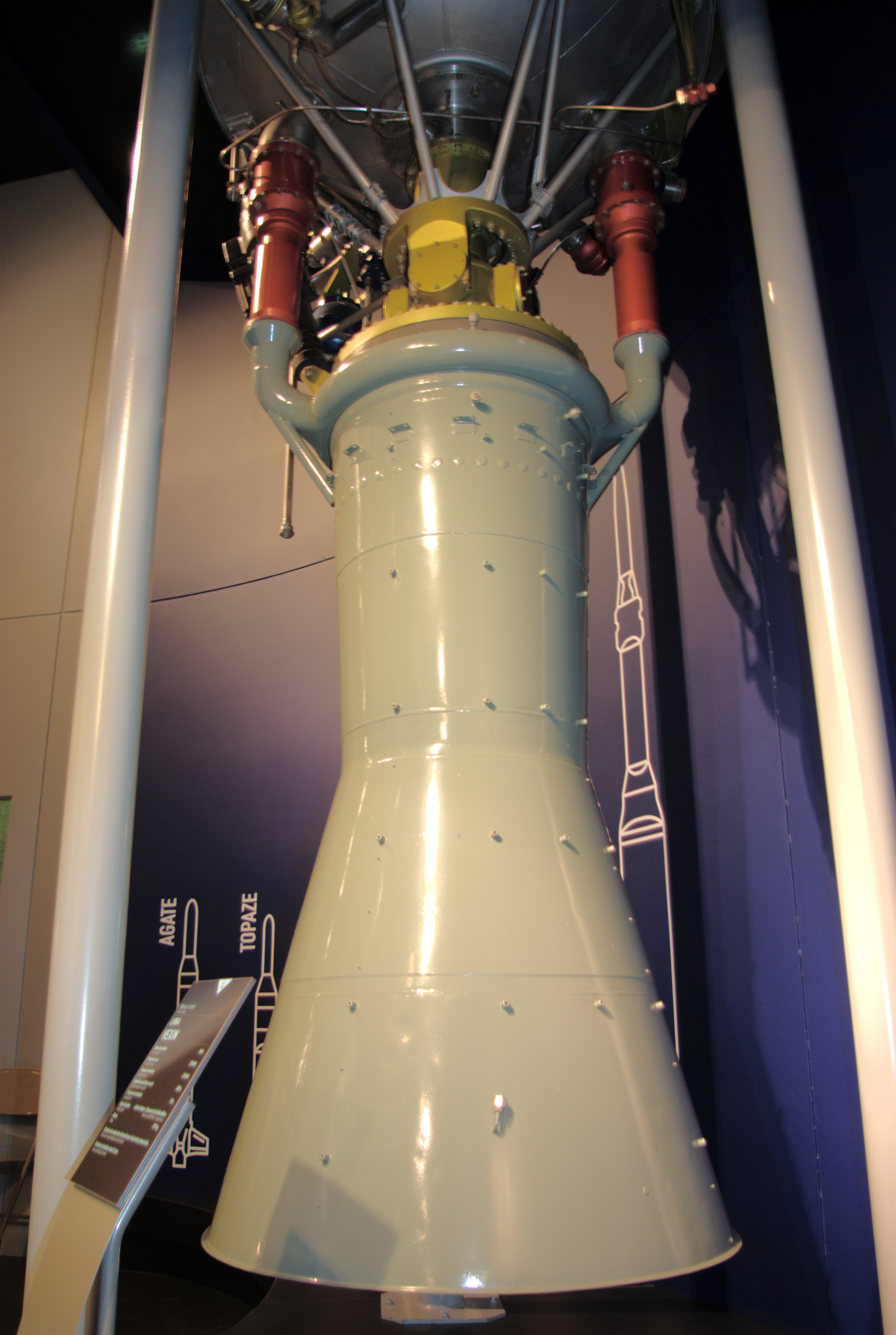
Vexin engine used on Diamant A first stage

This was the first version of the Diamant rockets, operational between 1965 and 1967. Remarkably for a newly developed system, all of the first four launches attempted launched were partly successful, the only failure occurring on the second launch when the payload was inserted into a lower orbit than planned.

Completely assembled, a Diamant A was 18.95 metres high and weighed 18.4 metric tons.

It possessed a first stage of 9.92m length, 1.34 metres in diameter, and a weight of 14.7 metric tons. The first stage had a Vexin B nitric acid/turpentine engine supplying a thrust of 274 kN for 93 seconds.

The Topaze second stage was 4.70 metres long and had a diameter of 80 centimetres. It weighed 2.93 metric tons and had a four solid propellant engine that developed a thrust of 150 kN for a duration of 44 seconds.

The third stage is 1.85 m long and weighed 708 kilograms. Its P064 solid-propellant engine burned for 45 seconds and developed a thrust of 52 kN.

=== Diamant B ===
Diamant B was an improved version of the Diamant A with a more powerful first stage, being able to place a 190 kg payload at a 200 km orbit inclined at 5°, a 25 kg payload at a 1000 km orbit, or a 130 kg payload in low polar orbit.

Five satellite launches were attempted between 1970 and 1973, of which the last two failed. All launches took place from Kourou in French Guiana.

Completely assembled, a Diamant B was 23.5 metres high and weighed 26.9 metric tons.

Its Améthyste first stage was 14.2 meters long, had a diameter of 1.4 metres and weighed 20 metric tons. Its LRBA Valois N_{2}O_{4}/UDMH engine developed a thrust of 315 kN for 116 seconds.

The Topaze P-2.2 second stage had one P4 solid propellant engine that developed a thrust of 150 kN for a duration of 44 seconds.

The P06 third stage was 1.66 metres long and had a diameter of 80 centimetres. Its P0.68 solid propellant engine developed a thrust of 50 kN for 46 seconds.

=== Diamant BP4 ===
This version incorporates a new second stage, while carrying the first and third stages over from its predecessor. It performed three successful launches in 1975, putting a total of four satellites into orbit.

Completely assembled, a Diamant BP4 measured 22.68 metres high and weighed 20.3 metric tons.

Its Rita P-4 second stage, which was derived from the MSBS rocket, was 2.28 metres long, 1.51 metres in diameter and its P4 solid propellant engine developed a thrust of 176 kN for 55 seconds.

== Launch history ==
Diamant flights
Date (UTC)	Variant	Payload	Launch site	Outcome	Notes
26 November 1965, 14:47	Diamant A	Astérix	Hammaguir	Success	
17 February 1966, 08:33	Diamant A	Diapason (satellite)	Hammaguir	Success	
8 February 1967, 09:39	Diamant A	Diadème (satellites) (Diadème I)	Hammaguir	Partial failure	Orbit lower than planned
15 February 1967, 10:06	Diamant A	Diadème (satellites) (Diadème II)	Hammaguir	Success	
10 March 1970, 12:20	Diamant B	DIAL (MIKA / WIKA)	Guiana	Success	
12 December 1970, 13:04	Diamant B	PEOLE	Guiana	Success	
15 April 1971, 09:19	Diamant B	Tournesol (satellite)	Guiana	Success	
5 December 1971, 16:20	Diamant B	Polaire (satellite)	Guiana	Failure	Second stage failure
21 May 1973, 08:47	Diamant B	Castor et Pollux (satellites)	Guiana	Failure	Fairing separation failure
6 February 1975, 16:35	Diamant BP4	Starlette et Stella (Starlette)	Guiana	Success	
17 May 1975, 10:32	Diamant BP4	Castor / Pollux	Guiana	Success	
27 September 1975, 08:37	Diamant BP4	Aura (satellite français)	Guiana	Success	

== See also ==
- Aggregat 8
- Comparison of orbital launcher families
- French space program
