= French space programme =

The French space program includes both civil and military spaceflight activities. It is the third oldest national space program in the world, after the Soviet (now Russian) and American space programs, and the largest space program in Europe.

== Background ==
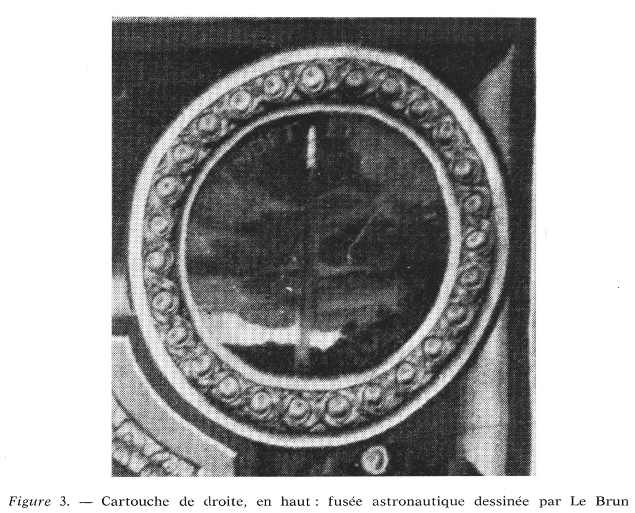
Space launch vehicle imagined on a Gobelins tapestry, ordered by Colbert and drawn by Le Brun, 1664.

Space travel has long been a significant ambition in French culture. From the Gobelins' 1664 tapestry representing a space rocket, to Jules Verne's 1865 novel From the Earth to the Moon and George Méliès' 1902 film A Trip to the Moon, space and rocketry were present in French society long before the technological means appeared to allow the development of a space exploration program.

During the late 18th century, Jean-François Pilâtre de Rozier, Jacques Charles and the Montgolfier brothers are seen as worldwide precursors and explorers of aeronautics, with the world record altitude then reached by a human at 7,016 metres (23,018 ft) performed by Joseph-Louis Gay-Lussac in 1804. Those names, their numerous students and their works will mark the early expertise of France's space program in all types of air balloons since.

In the beginning of the twentieth century, the origins of the French space program are tied to French technological developments in aerospace and astronautics, notably the nascent airplane and rocket industries.

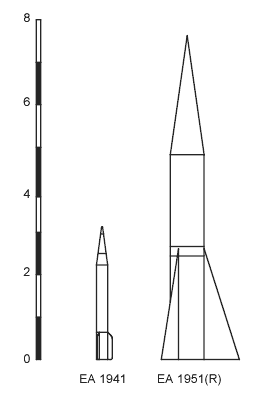
EA-EOLE rockets (as tested in 1940–1941 and 1951)

Robert Esnault-Pelterie appears as one of the early pioneers in space exploration design and rocket science. From 1908, he studied propulsion and space flight; without knowing the work of Russian mathematician Konstantin Tsiolkovsky at that time, he derived the mathematical equations for interplanetary flight, flight durations, and engine propulsion, and was later nominated President of the Chambre Syndicale des Industries Aéronautiques (Trade association of Aircraft industries) in 1912. From 1935 to 1939 he designed a high-altitude sounding rocket, but World War II interrupted his plans; German experts believed that the rocket could have reached its design goal of 60 miles (97 km). Esnault-Pelterie convinced physicist Jean-Jacques Barré, a pioneer in rocket propulsion, to collaborate on the design of a self-propelled cryogenic rocket. Between 1927 and 1933, Barré did extensive research and developed a rocket that could reach the upper atmosphere and space, the EA-41 Eole (see picture).

== History ==
The beginning of the institutional French space program dates back to 1946 when, right after World War II, the Laboratoire de recherches balistiques et aérodynamiques (LRBA, Ballistic and aerodynamic research laboratory) was formed in Vernon to develop the next generation of rockets, partly taking advantage of the German development of the V2 rocket.

Before this and during the war, as Free France continued to work, the EA-41 was tested and improved by military personnel, from October 1942 through to 1945.

22 May 1952: Véronique N1 is successfully launched from the Saharan desert.

In 1958, President Charles de Gaulle directed the creation of several space research committees. In 1959, the Comité d'études spatiales was born under the supervision of Pierre Auger. In 1961, de Gaulle signed the creation of the Centre national d'études spatiales (CNES) to coordinate French space activities. Development of Western Europe's first carrier rocket, the Diamant, began in 1962, first launched in Algeria.

On November 26, 1965, Astérix, the first French satellite in space, is successfully launched by a Diamant rocket from the Algerian desert. It is active for 2 consecutive days before ceasing to transmit.

In 1965, France's space launch pads and CNES settled in Kourou.

In 1973, France drove the creation of the European Space Agency and became its first contributor.

The French space budget, although stagnant since the early 2000s in constant euros, remains in absolute terms the largest of the member countries of the European Space Agency (ESA) and the third largest national budget (after the United States of America and the People's Republic of China) at €2.33 billion. In 2004, this budget stood at €1.698 billion, with €685 million being transferred to the Paris-based ESA for the programs conducted under its supervision.

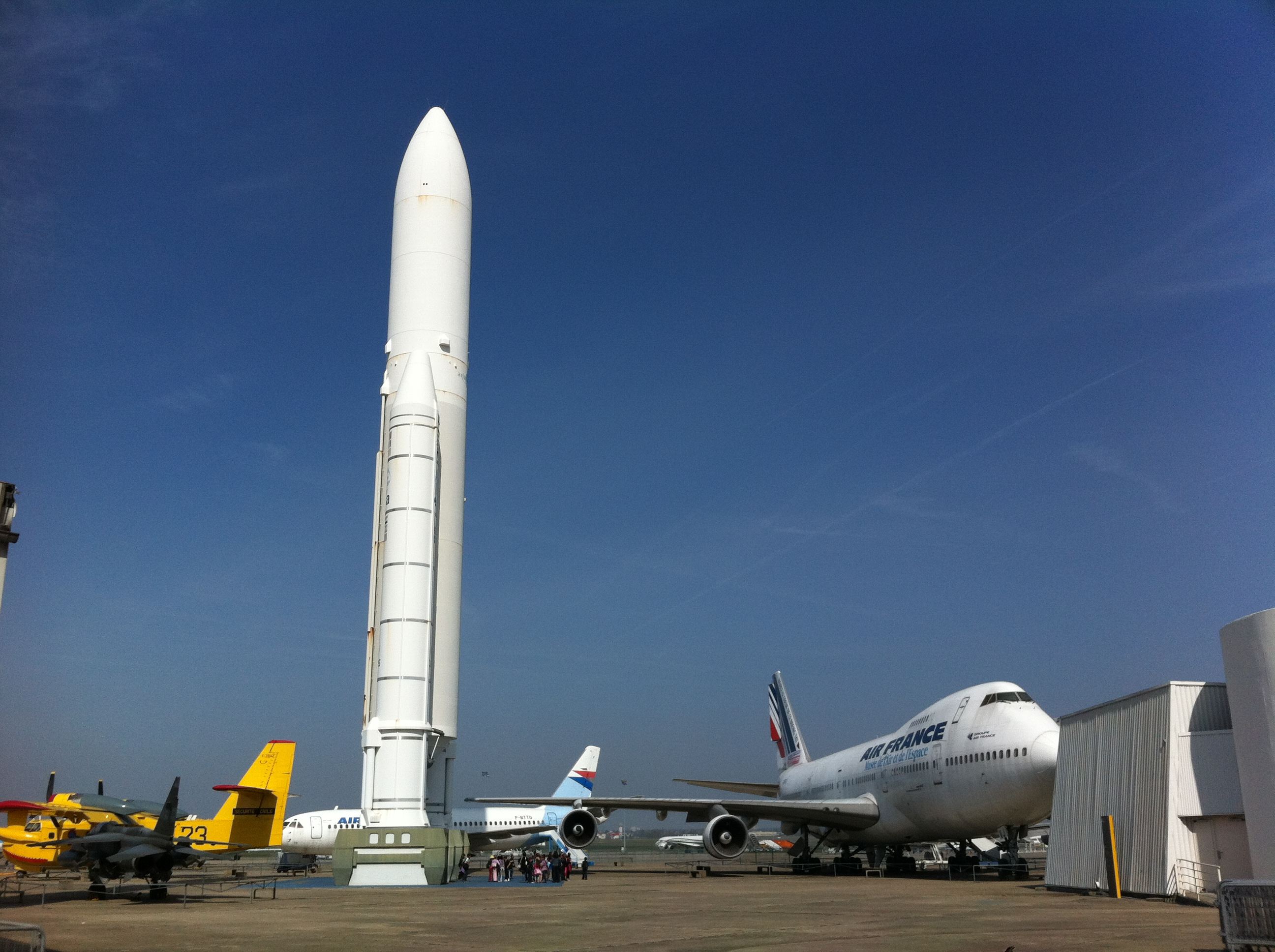
Ariane rocket at Le Bourget airport museum, Paris

The Ariane rocket family is France's own rocket family, whose use has been extended to the whole of ESA member countries.

Its spaceport, near Kourou, was selected in 1964 to host all of France's launches. Later, it was selected as ESA's launch site. Before being in French Guiana, France's space launches were made from Algeria, in Colomb-Béchar and Hammaguir.

The French space program thus benefits from the best ground position for launch sites on Earth, as its position 5.3° north of the equator allows rockets to gain propulsion from the spinning of the Earth when launched eastward (+460 m/s) and save on propellant. No other governmental launch sites allow this level of physical parameters. It is also able to launch satellites into polar orbits from this spaceport, although the rotational velocity becomes a penalty for Sun-Synchronous orbits.

== Launch statistics ==
As of 18 January 2026

As of 2017, Kourou counts amongst the spaceports with the highest percentage of successful launches, both successive and overall. Here is a chronology of all orbital launches from the Kourou spaceport since 1970, under the French and European space programmes.

=== Flights by launcher ===
Active:
- Ariane 6
- Vega
Retired:
- Diamant
- Europa 2
- Ariane 1
- Ariane 2
- Ariane 3
- Ariane 4
- Ariane 5
- Soyuz ST

=== Flights by mission outcome ===
Success Failure Partial Failure Scheduled

- Charts include all orbital launches from Kourou; sounding rockets are excluded.
- Historical data: launch tables from List of Ariane launches, Soyuz ST, Vega and Encyclopedia Aeronautica.

== Collaborations ==
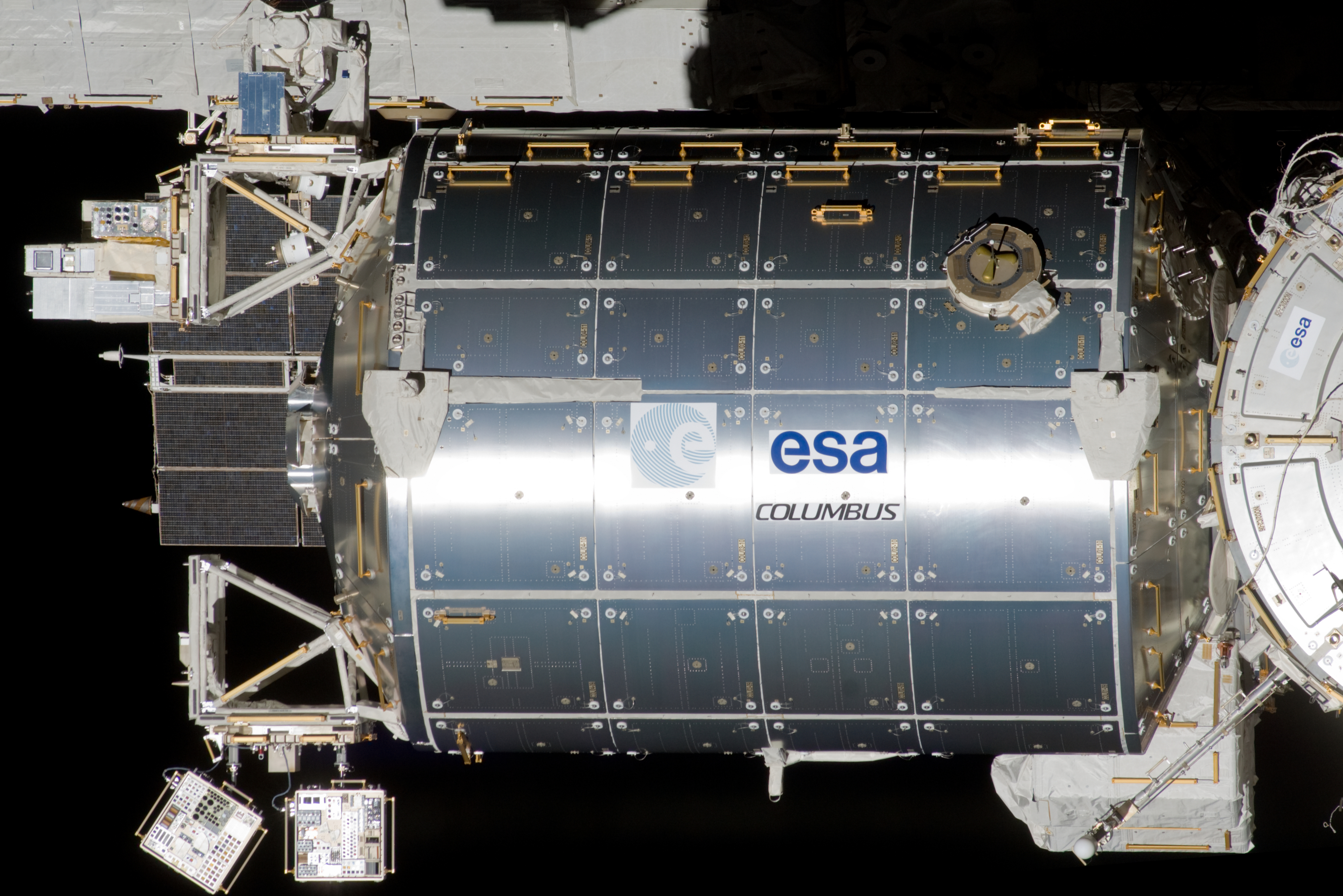
Columbus module

France's public involvement in space technologies is also deep into European programs such as Columbus (Thales Alenia Space) or Automated Transfer Vehicle (Airbus Defence and Space).

The French space program includes collaborations between its institutions and other countries, European as well as other foreign countries and institutions (JAXA, ISRO, NASA, CNSA) in projects ranging from the Herschel Space Observatory to BepiColombo, Saral/Altika and the Planck space observatory.

Since 2010, France and Russia have been collaborating on several space missions, including long-run science programmes like Cardiomed, dedicated to monitoring cardiovascular health in cosmonauts.

In 2016, for the COP21, CNES and ISRO impulsed a groundbreaking and worldwide plan to unite all space agencies for the gathering of satellite information and detection on greenhouse gas emissions, allowing more precise measurements and decision making. In addition, CNES and ESA have a strong background of collaboration, notably building the largest single satellite surveyance program for earth's biological monitoring (Copernicus Programme).

CNES has provided essential instruments (cameras) on an Indian mission to the Moon (Chandrayaan-1), launched in January 2018. A consortium led by the CNES also built Argos instruments on board India's Oceansat-3 in 2018. A third collaboration between the ISRO and French space actors (LESIA, CNRS, Université Paris-VI and Université Paris-VII) has seen the launch of PicSat in January 2018, a nano-satellite that surveys the Beta Pictoris star for exoplanets.

The French space agency was also responsible for the construction of the main instruments on the French-German-American InSight mission to Mars, which launched on 5 May 2018 and landed on 26 November 2018.

On 20 October 2018, CNES and JAXA launched the BepiColombo mission to study the magnetic field of Mercury and map its surface.

On 29 October 2018, the CFOSAT (China-France Oceanography SATellite) was placed into Earth orbit to study ocean surface winds and waves. After President Macron's state visit to China in January 2018, the French-Chinese collaboration in space was increased significantly and includes more in-depth collaboration, notably in the sharing of CFOSAT data, meant to study oceans and their interaction with the atmosphere, as well as in the SVOM program.

In 2020, Solar Orbiter was launched by NASA, containing instruments designed by CNES and other French industrial actors.

The French satellite TARANIS, with international collaboration, was launched in November 2020. The launch was a failure (of the launching rocket) and the satellite never entered use. It would have been the 1st satellite designed to observe lightning at altitudes of 20 to 100 km.

== Future projects ==
The construction of the Ariane 6 launcher, after being approved by all ESA countries in 2016 was completed with its inaugural flight that took place on 9 July 2024. It is designed by Airbus Safran Launchers.

2023 will mark the launch of Jupiter Icy Moons Explorer. It will study Jupiter and three of its moons with a view to gaining new insights into how life emerged. This mission is a collaboration of CNES with CNRS and ESA.

France and Germany's collaborative satellite, Merlin, is set to launch in 2028, after a previous delay. The purpose of the mission is to study methane levels and concentrations in the Earth's atmosphere.

Idefix - Phobos rover, in collaboration with DLR, for the JAXA-led Martian Moons eXploration mission

== See also ==
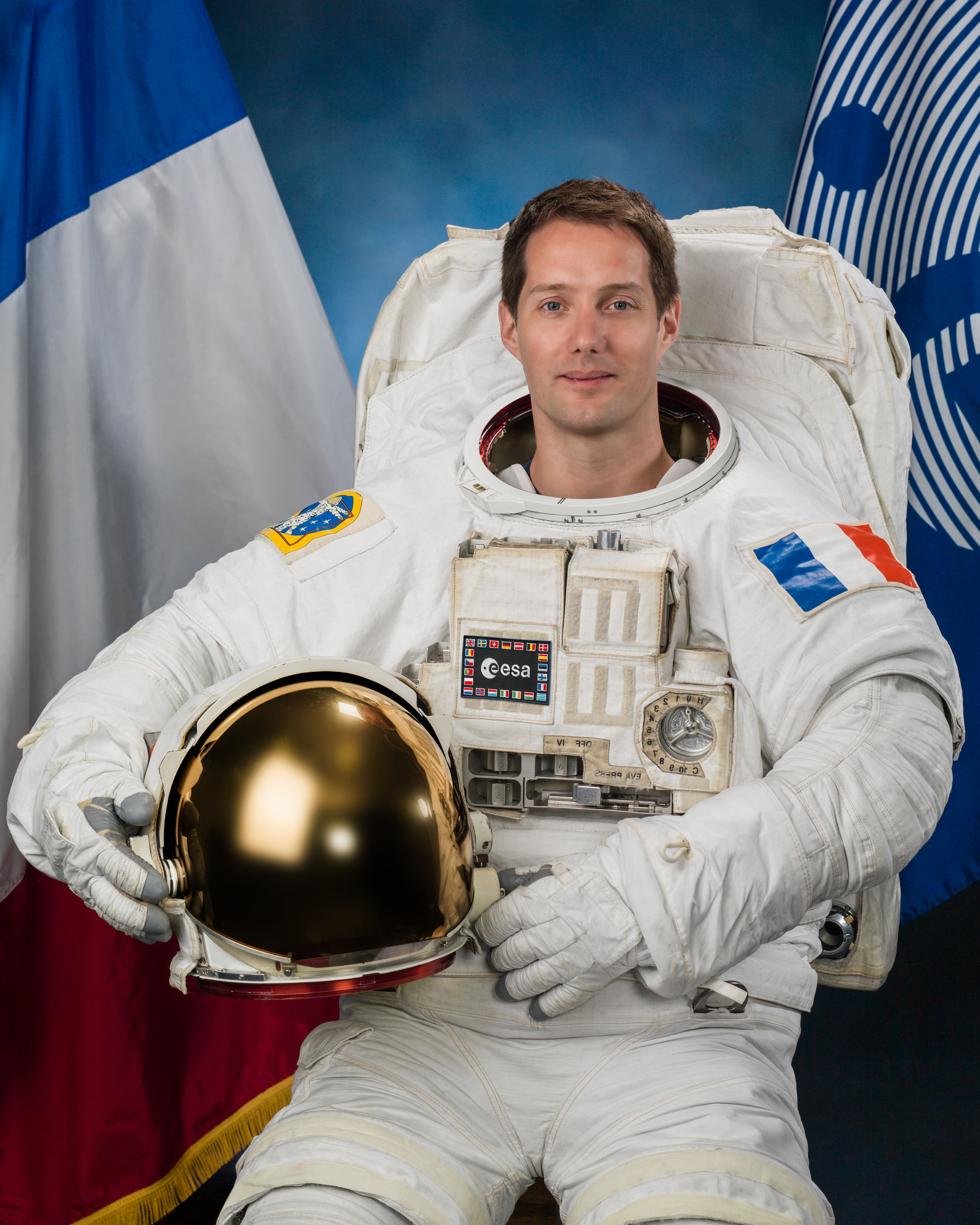
French spationaut Thomas Pesquet in 2016

- People
  - Joseph Louis Lagrange
  - Pierre-Simon Laplace
  - Augustin-Jean Fresnel
  - Jean-Yves Le Gall
  - François Arago
  - Philippe Baptiste
  - French spationauts
- Companies and organisations
  - CNES
  - European Space Agency
  - Airbus
  - Safran
  - Arianespace
  - ArianeGroup
  - Astrium
  - Thales Group
  - Thales Alenia Space
  - Aérospatiale
  - Dassault
  - ISAE-SUPAERO
  - École nationale supérieure de mécanique et d'aérotechnique (ISAE-ENSMA)
  - École nationale supérieure d'ingénieurs de Poitiers
  - École nationale de l'aviation civile
  - France AEROTECH
  - École nationale supérieure d’électronique, informatique, télécommunications, mathématique et mécanique de Bordeaux
  - French Air and Space Force

Map of the Centre Spatial Guyanais (Guiana Space Centre)

- Locations
  - Guiana Space Centre
  - Aerospace Valley
  - Toulouse Space Centre
  - Musée aéronautique et spatial Safran
  - Cannes Mandelieu Space Center
  - Bureau des Longitudes
- More
  - Félicette, the only cat in space
