= Véronique (rocket) =

1950s French sounding rocket

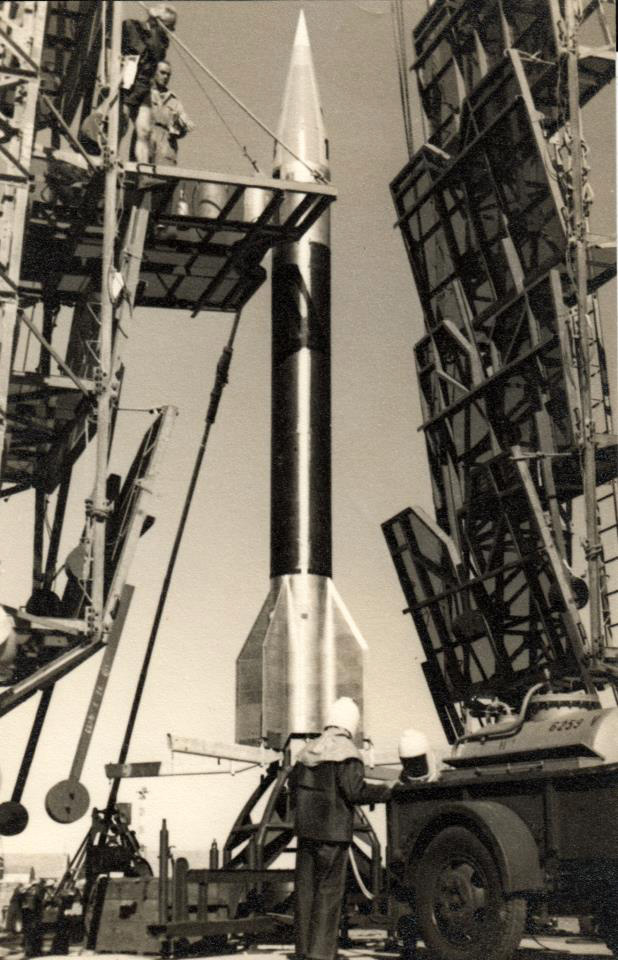
- Preparation of a Véronique-AGI rocket circa 1962
- Country of origin: France

Size
- Height: 6 to 11.7m (Véronique 61M)
- Diameter: 0.55 m
- Mass: 1 to 2 tons
- Stages: 1

Capacity

Launch history
- Status: Succeeded by the Diamant rocket
- Launch sites: CIEES, Guiana Space Centre

First stage
- Thrust: 20 to 60 kN (Véronique 61M)
- Propellant: Nitric acid / kerosene or turpentine

Véronique (French pronunciation: [veʁɔnik]) was a French liquid-fuelled sounding rocket of the 1950s. It was the first liquid-fuel research rocket in Western Europe.

Véronique was a French-led project that had its roots in the German V-2 rocket, and was partially developed by German scientists who had worked in Peenemünde. A successor to the cancelled Super V-2, Véronique was built between 1950 and 1969 in several versions, of which the P2, P6 and R were only experimental models. They were made in Vernon, Eure. The name Véronique is a portmanteau of Vernon-électronique, and is also a common French first name.

On 20 February 1959, the first Véronique launch was performed, although it was recorded as a failure. One day later, the second launch took place, which attained an altitude of 84 miles (135 km). The last Veronique-61 was launched on 31 May 1974. The programme was eclipsed by new rockets, such as the wholly indigenous Diamant launcher.

== History ==
=== Background ===
In the immediate aftermath of the Second World War, various nations were keen to incorporate recent military advances into their own armed forces; the newly liberated nation of France was no exception. Akin to the American Operation Paperclip, France recruited various scientists and skilled personnel from the former Axis countries, particularly those with knowledge of advanced aerospace technologies. Among these were over 30 staff that had formerly worked at Peenemünde, the hub of the Nazi German rocket programme that produced the V-2 rocket.

During mid-1946, France embarked on development of a V-2 derivative, popularly referred to as the Super V-2. This programme involved two distinct phases, the first being the establishment of appropriate facilities to produce V-2 components – this was partially achieved via the acquisition of most of the components for roughly 30 V-2s, either from subcontractors in France or sourced from the French zone of occupation in Germany. Surveys for a suitable launch facility in Algeria were also conducted, opting for a site near Colomb-Bechar (CIEES).

However, major problems with the Super V-2 programme had become clear by early 1947. France's allies were unwilling to supply V-2 components, yet establishing a completely independent production of all components in France was estimated to take at least five years, by which point the Super V-2 was expected to have become obsolete. Thus, it was decided that two separate programmes would be pursued; in addition to work on the Super V-2, a purely French derivative, initially referred to as project 4212, would be designed by a separate team. During 1948, the Super V-2 project was abandoned in favour of other efforts, cumulating in project 4213, a one-tenth scale rocket that was given the name Veronique, a portmanteau of Vernon et electronique.

During March 1949, work formally commenced on Veronique. The project had the primary objective of delivering a flight test vehicle for liquid rocket engine development; a secondary purpose was the launching of scientific payloads at high altitudes. Principal responsibility for manufacturing was held by the Laboratoire de recherches balistiques et aérodynamiques (LRBA).

=== Into flight ===
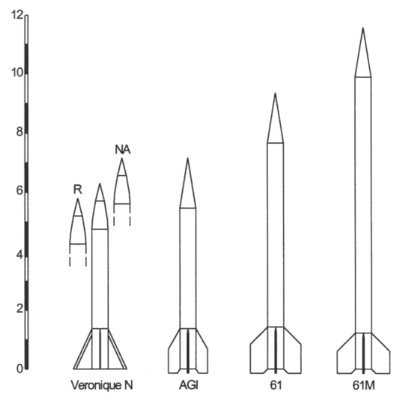
DEFA Veronique rockets

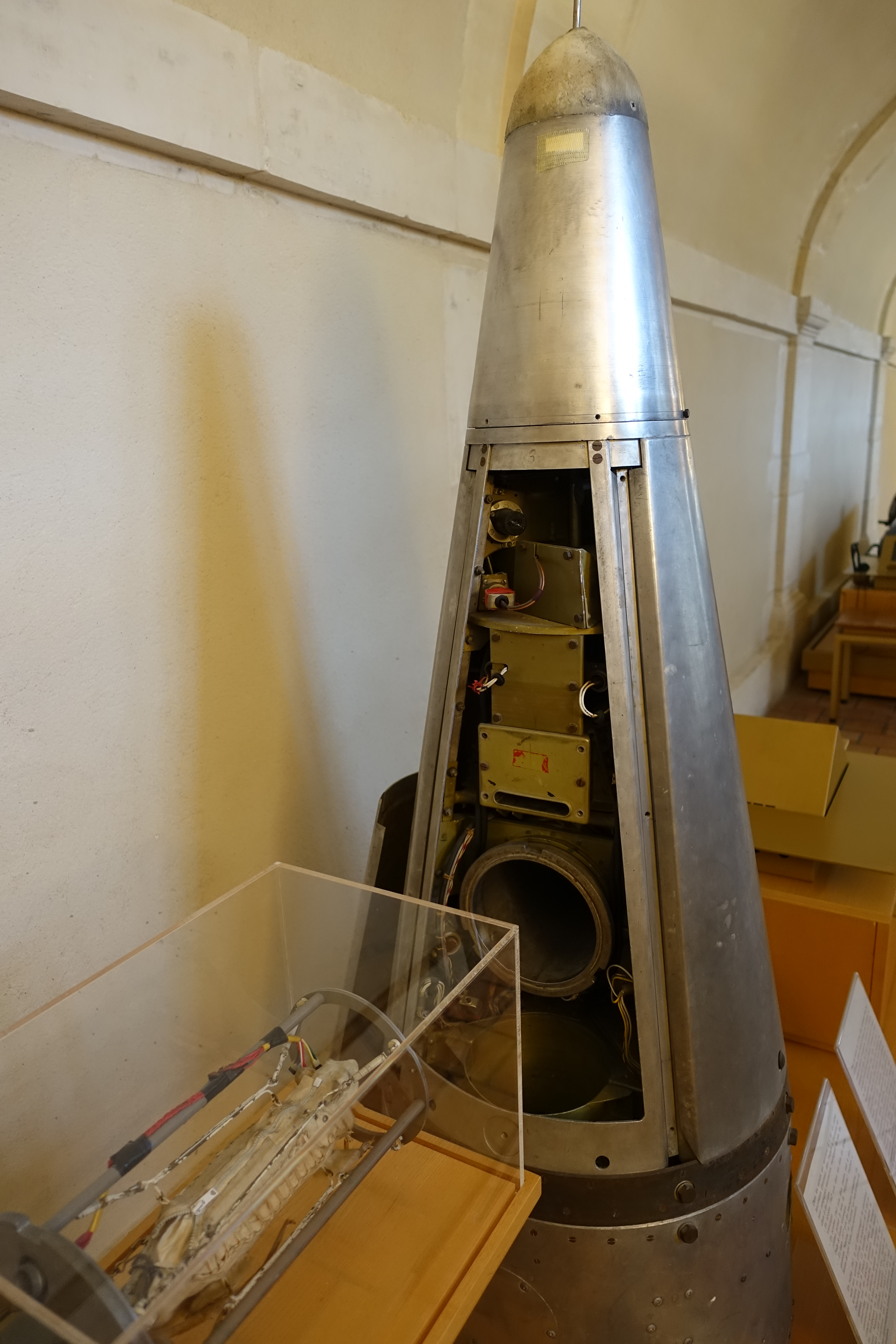
Véronique rocket habitat

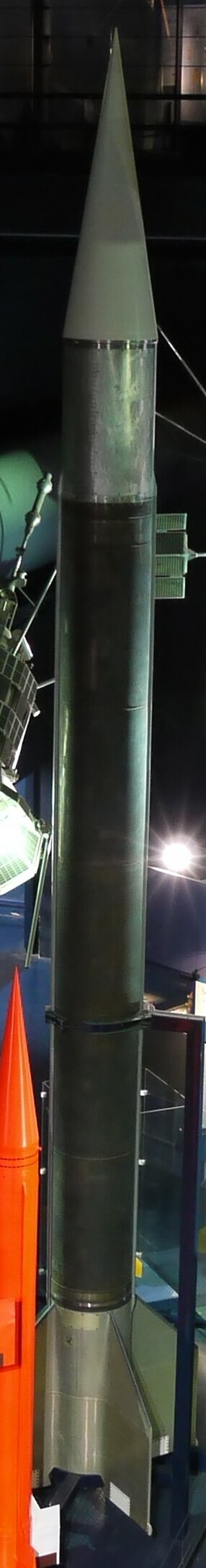
Véronique rocket at Musée de l'air et de l'espace

Partial system tests were conducted in 1951 and early 1952 (Veronique P and R (Réduite)). However, it was not until May 1952 that the first full-scale Véronique-N (Normal) was launched. It was powered by a single liquid-fuelled rocket motor with a thrust of four tonnes; its fuel was a combination of kerosene and nitric acid. Veronique employed a unique wire-guidance system that used four 55 m cables attached to its fins immediately upon launch. Initially, the rocket motor suffered from combustion instability, which became a leading cause of early launch failures; furthermore, the maximum altitude of 65 km was found to be insufficient for many scientific purposes.

Accordingly, it was decided to undertake a lengthy development programme throughout the 1950s which produced numerous other models were produced for specific purposes. The Véronique AGI (Année Géophysique Internationale) was developed as a sounding rocket, a total of 15 such rockets were constructed using subsidies provided by the French National Defense Scientific Action Committee. This model was largely similar to the Véronique-N, had had a reduced empty weight, and a simplified engine that used turpentine fuel in place of kerosene. A lengthened model, the Véronique NA (Normale Allongée), enabled an altitude of 135 km to be reached; it also features a modified engine injector that had greater stability. A pair of Véronique P2 test vehicles were produced to experiment with the wire-guidance system.

The definitive version was the Veronique-61 (1961), which featured substantial improvements such as a 50% increase in thrust. It was a far larger rocket, capable of carrying a 60 kg payload to an altitude of 315 km. A lengthened version, the Veronique-61M (Modifié), was also produced, suitable for carrying payloads of up to 100 kg. On 8 June 1964, the first was launched; the last Veronique-61 was launched on 31 May 1974. Of the 21 launches performed, 20 were considered to be failures to varying degrees.

Amongst the tests in aid of scientific research that were conducted using the rocket were a series of biological experiments involving live animals. On account of the available payload capacity and thrust output available via Véronique, the use of larger animals was not possible, thus rats and cats were used; these were carried within a sealed container within the rocket's nose cone which was designed to be retrievable and for the return of its occupant alive. One consequence of these flights was the only recorded launch of a cat into space.

By 1965, the Véronique had begun to be eclipsed by a newer rocket, which was also entirely indigenously designed, the Diamant expendable launch system.

== Variants ==
Five Veronique versions were developed:

Type	Mass	Length	Diameter	Thrust	Duration	Payload	Apogee
Veronique N	1,100 kg (2,400 lb)	6.5 m (21 ft 4 in)	55 cm (22 in)	40 kN (9,000 lb_{f})	32 seconds	60 kg (130 lb)	70 km (43 mi)
Veronique NA	1,435 kg (3,164 lb)	7.3 m (23 ft 11 in)	55 cm (22 in)	40 kN (9,000 lb_{f})	45 seconds	60 kg (130 lb)	135 km (84 mi)
Veronique AGI	1,342 kg (2,959 lb)	7.3 m (23 ft 11 in)	55 cm (22 in)	40 kN (9,000 lb_{f})	49 seconds	60 kg (130 lb)	210 km (130 mi)
Veronique 61	1,932 kg (4,259 lb)	9.5 m (31 ft 2 in)	55 cm (22 in)	60 kN (13,000 lb_{f})	54 seconds	60 kg (130 lb)	315 km (196 mi)
Veronique 61M	2,050 kg (4,520 lb)	11.7 m (38 ft 5 in)	55 cm (22 in)	60 kN (13,000 lb_{f})	56 seconds	100 kg (220 lb)	325 km (202 mi)

== Launches ==
Veronique rockets were launched from 1950 to 1975:

Date	Site	Vehicle	Mission	Results
02 Aug 1950	Suippes	Veronique R1	Technology	Success? (3 m)
04 Aug 1950	Suippes	Veronique R2	Technology	Success? (8 m)
06 Apr 1951	Vernon	Veronique P2	Technology	Success
02 Oct 1951	Suippes	Veronique R3	Technology	Success? (15 m)
03 Oct 1951	Suippes	Veronique P5/1	Technology	
04 Oct 1951	Suippes	Veronique P5/2	Technology	
05 Oct 1951	Suippes	Veronique R4	Technology	Success (1800 m)
06 Oct 1951	Suippes	Veronique R5	Technology	Success (1820 m)
25 Jan 1952	Le Cardonnet	Veronique P6/1	Technology	Success
26 Jan 1952	Le Cardonnet	Veronique R7	Technology	Partial Success - Nosecone not jettisoned
28 Jan 1952	Le Cardonnet	Veronique P6/2	Technology	Success
28 Jan 1952	Le Cardonnet	Veronique R6	Technology	Success (1100 m)
30 Jan 1952	Le Cardonnet	Veronique R8	Technology	Success
20 May 1952	CIEES	Veronique N1	Technology	Failure (19 km)
21 May 1952	CIEES	Veronique N2	Technology	Failure (14 km)
22 May 1952	CIEES	Veronique N3	Technology	Success (60 km)
08 Nov 1952	CIEES	Veronique N4	Technology	Failure (10 km)
09 Nov 1952	CIEES	Veronique N5	Technology	Failure (<1 km)
13 Nov 1952	CIEES	Veronique N7	Technology	Failure (4 km)
16 Nov 1952	CIEES	Veronique N6	Technology	Failure (6 km)
17 Nov 1952	CIEES	Veronique N9	Technology	Failure (10 km)
18 Nov 1952	CIEES	Veronique N8	Technology	Failure (7 km)
18 Apr 1953	CIEES	Veronique N11	Technology	Failure (3 km)
21 Apr 1953	CIEES	Veronique N10	Technology	Success (45 km)
20 Feb 1954	CIEES	Veronique NA15	Technology	Failure (29 km)
21 Feb 1954	CIEES	Veronique NA14	Technology	Success(135 km)
17 Oct 1954	CIEES	Veronique NA13	Technology	Failure (39 km)
29 Oct 1954	CIEES	Veronique NA12	VLF transmission	Success (104 km)
07 Mar 1959	CIEES	Veronique AGI18	Na release	Failure
10 Mar 1959	CIEES	Veronique AGI17	Na release	Success
12 Mar 1959	CIEES	Veronique AGI16	Na release	Success
23 Feb 1960	CIEES	Veronique AGI23	Scientific	Failure
02 Mar 1960	CIEES	Veronique AGI22	Na release	Success
05 Mar 1960	CIEES	Veronique AGI21	Na release	Success
13 Jun 1960	CIEES	Veronique AGI20	Na release	Success
16 Jun 1960	CIEES	Veronique AGI19	Na release	Success
18 Jun 1960	CIEES	Veronique AGI25	Explosivee	Success
22 Jun 1960	CIEES	Veronique AGI26	Explosive	Success
11 Feb 1961	CIEES	Veronique AGI27	Scientific	Success
13 Feb 1961	CIEES	Veronique AGI28	Scientific	Failure
15 Feb 1961	CIEES	Veronique AGI29	Scientific	Success
18 Feb 1961	CIEES	Veronique AGI30	Scientific	Failure
22 Feb 1961	CIEES	Veronique AGI24	Biology	Success (110 km)
10 Jun 1961	CIEES	Veronique AGI31	Double explosive	Success
24 May 1962	CIEES	Veronique AGI39	Explosive	Success (168 km)
31 May 1962	CIEES	Veronique AGI38	Explosive	Success
01 Jun 1962	CIEES	Veronique AGI41	Double explosive	Success
04 Jun 1962	CIEES	Veronique AGI42	Double explosive	Failure
06 Jun 1962	CIEES	Veronique AGI43	Explosive	Success
15 Oct 1962	CIEES	Veronique AGI37	Biology	Success (120 km)
18 Oct 1962	CIEES	Veronique AGI36	Biology	Partial Success (110 lm)
19 Oct 1962	CIEES	Veronique AGI44	Technology	Success (135 km)
22 Oct 1962	CIEES	Veronique AGI46	Technology	Success (120 km)
23 Oct 1962	CIEES	Veronique AGI32	Diffuse solar radiation	Success (175 km)
29 Oct 1962	CIEES	Veronique AGI34	VLF transmission	Success (180 km)
20 Apr 1963	CIEES	Veronique AGI35	Ionosphere	Success (175 km)
23 Apr 1963	CIEES	Veronique AGI49	Ionosphere	Success (140 km)
01 May 1963	CIEES	Veronique AGI45	Ionosphere	Success (160 km)
10 May 1963	CIEES	Veronique AGI48	Solar corona (UV) / Ptr	Partial Success (135 km), no recovery
18 Jun 1963	CIEES	Veronique AGI33	Electron density	Partial Success (160 km)
19 Jun 1963	CIEES	Veronique AGI40	Electron density	(38 km), Destroyed at 34 sec
18 Oct 1963	CIEES	Veronique AGI47	Biology	Success(155 km)
24 Oct 1963	CIEES	Veronique AGI50	Biology	Failure(88 km)
14 Apr 1964	CIEES	Veronique AGI51	FU110 Atomic H (Ly-alpha), Solar X-rays	Partial Success (119 km)
08 Jun 1964	CIEES	Veronique 61/75	FU120 Technology	Success(260 km)
13 Jun 1964	CIEES	Veronique 61/76	FU120 Technology	Success(260 km)
04 Nov 1964	CIEES	Veronique AGI53	FU110 Atomic H (Ly-alpha), Solar X-rays	Success(152 km)
08 Nov 1964	CIEES	Veronique AGI52	FU111 UV Solar Astronomy / Ptr	Success(98 km)
12 Feb 1965	CIEES	Veronique AGI56	FU100 Technology / Ptr	Failure (95 km), untimely fairing jettison
27 May 1965	CIEES	Veronique 61/79	FU144 Atomic H (Ly-alpha)	(70 km)
22 Oct 1965	CIEES	Veronique AGI54	FU115 Electron density	Success (210 km)
28 Oct 1965	CIEES	Veronique AGI55	FU115 Electron density	Success (210 km)
24 Mar 1966	CIEES	Veronique 61M/80	FU155 Technology	Success (209 km)
04 Apr 1966	CIEES	Veronique 61M/78	FU145 Technology (Attitude control)	(23 km)
06 Apr 1966	CIEES	Veronique AGI57	FU126 Solar corona (UV) / Ptr	Success (130 km)
27 Jun 1966	CIEES	Veronique AGI60	FU154 Technology (recovery)	Success (123 km)
01 Oct 1966	CIEES	Veronique 61M/77	FU145 Technology + Ionosphere / Stab	Partial Success (166 km)
24 Nov 1966	CIEES	Veronique 61M/82	FU158 Technology (recovery)	Partial Success (230 km)
09 Dec 1966	CIEES	Veronique AGI59	FU149 Ion Density, mass spectrometry	Success (122 km)
11 Jan 1967	CIEES	Veronique 61M/84	FU161 X-ray and UV astronomy / Stab	Success (158 km)
13 Jan 1967	CIEES	Veronique AGI63	FU160 Solar corona (UV) / Ptr	Success (123 km)
17 Jan 1967	CIEES	Veronique 61M/85	FU145b X-ray and UV astronomy / Stab	Success (205 km)
24 Feb 1967	CIEES	Veronique 61M/81	FU176 Technology (recovery)	Success (200 km)
17 Mar 1967	CIEES	Veronique AGI64	FU174 Solar corona (UV) / Ptr	(32 km)
24 Mar 1967	CIEES	Veronique 61M/86	FU156 Ionosphere + Biology	Success (365 km)
29 Mar 1967	CIEES	Veronique 61M/87	FU156 Ionosphere + Biology	Success (305 km)
04 Apr 1967	CIEES	Veronique 61M/88	FU178 X-ray and UV astronomy / Stab	Success (196 km)
09 Apr 1968	Kourou	Veronique AGI62	FU184 Technology (sea recovery)	Success (113 km)
25 Jul 1968	Kourou	Veronique 61M/89	FU185 Technology + X-ray astronomy / Stab	Partial Success (185 km), no recovery
18 Dec 1968	Kourou	Veronique 61M/83	FU159 UV astronomy / Stab	Partial Success (162 km), no recovery
22 Dec 1968	Kourou	Veronique 61M/90	FU159 X-ray and UV astronomy / Stab	Partial Success (188 km), no recovery
20 Feb 1969	Kourou	Veronique AGI61	FU170 CIRCE, Mass spectrometry	Failure(103 km), untimely fairing jettison
08 Jun 1971	Kourou	Veronique 61M/93	FU194 GESAIR, Ionosphere + Biology	Success (206 km)
12 Jun 1971	Kourou	Veronique 61M/94	FU194 GESAIR, Ionosphere + Biology	Success (211 km)
16 Dec 1971	Kourou	Veronique 61M/92	FU208 CISASPE, Ionosphere (active sounding)	Success (227 km)
17 Apr 1973	Kourou	Veronique 61M/	FU200 3SUV, UV solar astronomy / Ptr	Success (200 km)
31 May 1975	Kourou	Veronique 61M/	FU216 FAUST, UV astronomy / Stab	(172 km)

== See also ==
- Aggregat 8
- French space program
- Vesta (rocket)
- Diamant
