= Hammaguir =

- Village and air base
- Location within Algeria
- Coordinates: 30°54′N 3°2′W
- Country: Algeria
- Province: Béchar Province
- District: Abadla District
- Elevation: 744 m (2,441 ft)
- Time zone: UTC+1 (CET)

Hammaguir (also written Hamaguir and Hammaguira) (Arabic: حماقير) is a village in Abadla District, Béchar Province, Algeria, south-west of Béchar. It lies on the N50 national highway between Béchar and Tindouf. The location is notable for its role in French rocketry.

Hamaguir Airport is located there.

== Role in French rocketry and spaceflight ==
Between 1947 and 1967 there was a rocket launch site, the Interarmy Special Vehicles Test Centre (abbreviated CIEES in French), near Hammaguir, used by France for launching sounding rockets and the satellite carrier "Diamant" between 1965 and 1967. The Diamant launch pad at Hammaguir is located at 30° 46′ 41″ N, 3° 3′ 14″ W. The CIEES facility was also used for testing surface-to-air and air-to-air missiles.

The first French satellite Astérix was launched from there in 1965.

In honor of its role in the early development of French spaceflight, its name was given to a Martian crater in 1979 and to an asteroid crater in 2009.

=== Notable Launches ===
Date of launch	Satellite	Payload mass	Support rocket	References
18 October 1963	Félicette (cat)	15 kg	Véronique	
26 November 1965	Astérix-1	40 kg	Diamant	
8 February 1967	Diadéme-1	22.7 kg	Diamant	
15 February 1967	Diadéme-2	22.7 kg	Diamant	

== Climate ==
Hammaguir has a hot desert climate, with extremely hot summers and cool winters, and very little precipitation throughout the year.

Climate data for Hammaguir
Month	Jan	Feb	Mar	Apr	May	Jun	Jul	Aug	Sep	Oct	Nov	Dec	Year
Mean daily maximum °C (°F)	17.1 (62.8)	20.3 (68.5)	23.7 (74.7)	28.4 (83.1)	33.2 (91.8)	38.0 (100.4)	42.6 (108.7)	41.2 (106.2)	35.3 (95.5)	28.8 (83.8)	21.6 (70.9)	17.6 (63.7)	29.0 (84.2)
Daily mean °C (°F)	9.8 (49.6)	12.8 (55.0)	16.2 (61.2)	20.6 (69.1)	25.3 (77.5)	30.0 (86.0)	34.3 (93.7)	33.3 (91.9)	27.9 (82.2)	21.7 (71.1)	15.0 (59.0)	10.7 (51.3)	21.5 (70.6)
Mean daily minimum °C (°F)	2.5 (36.5)	5.3 (41.5)	8.8 (47.8)	12.9 (55.2)	17.4 (63.3)	22.1 (71.8)	26.1 (79.0)	25.4 (77.7)	20.6 (69.1)	14.6 (58.3)	8.5 (47.3)	3.8 (38.8)	14.0 (57.2)
Average precipitation mm (inches)	5 (0.2)	5 (0.2)	7 (0.3)	5 (0.2)	4 (0.2)	3 (0.1)	3 (0.1)	4 (0.2)	6 (0.2)	9 (0.4)	11 (0.4)	6 (0.2)	68 (2.7)
Source: climate-data.org
