= List of sounding rockets =

This is a list of sounding rockets used for suborbital research flights.

== Argentina ==
- Centauro series
  - Alfa Centauro, Beta Centauro, Gamma Centauro
- Canopus series
  - Canopus 1, Canopus 2
- Gradicom series
  - GRADICOM I (PCX-900), GRADICOM II (PCX2), GRADICOM III
- Proson-M1
- Rigel
- Castor (A)
- Centenario
- Orión series
  - Orión-1, Orión-2
- Tauro

== Australia ==
- Aeolus
- Aero High
- AUSROC series
  - AUSROC I, AUSROC II, AUSROC II-2, AUSROC 2.5, AUSROC III
- Cockatoo series
  - Cockatoo Mk 1, Cockatoo Mk 2, Cockatoo Mk 3, Cockatoo Mk 4
- Corella
- HEAC
- HAD
- HARP
- HAT
- Long Tom
- Lorikeet series
  - Lorikeet Mk-1, Lorikeet Mk-2
- Kookaburra series
  - Kookaburra Mk.1, Kookaburra Mk.2, Kookaburra Mk.3
- Sighter
- Zuni

== Brazil ==
- MB
- Sonda family
  - Sonda 1, Sonda 2, Sonda 3, Sonda 3 M1, Sonda 4
  - VS-30, VS-30/Orion, VS-40, VSB-30
- S-40 series
  - VS-40M
- VSV-30 (Brazilian Exploration Vehicle)

== Canada ==
- Black Brant family
  - Black Brant 1 (Black Brant I),
  - Black Brant 2 (Black Brant II), Black Brant 2B (Black Brant IIB)
  - Black Brant 3 (Black Brant III), Black Brant 3B (Black Brant IIIB)
  - Black Brant 4, Black Brant 4A (Black Brant IVA), Black Brant 4B (Black Brant IVB)
  - Black Brant 5, Black Brant 5A (Black Brant VA), Black Brant 5B (Black Brant VB), Black Brant 5C (Black Brant VC)
  - Black Brant 6 (Black Brant VI)
  - Black Brant 7 (Black Brant VAII)
  - Black Brant 8 (Nike-Black Brant), Black Brant 8B, Black Brant 8C
  - Black Brant 9 (Black Brant IX), Black Brant 9B, (Black Brant IXB), Black Brant 9BM1, Black Brant 9CM1 (Black Brant 9 Mod-1, Starfire-1)
  - Black Brant 10 (Black Brant X), Black Brant 10B (Black Brant XB), Black Brant 10CM1 (Black Brant Mod-1)
  - Black Brant 11 (Black Brant XI), Black Brant 11-A
  - Black Brant 12 (Black Brant XII), Black Brant 12-A
- Excalibur family
  - Excalibur, Excalibur 2
- HARP family
  - HARP 5-1, HARP 5-3,
  - HARP 7-1, HARP 7-2
- Martlet family
  - Martlet, Martlet 1
  - Martlet 2, Martlet 2A, Martlet 2B, Martlet 2C, Martlet 2G
  - Martlet 3, Martlet 3A, Martlet 3B, Martlet 3D, Martlet 3E
  - Martlet 4, Martlet 4A, Martlet 4B, Martlet 4C
- Scorpius SR-XM-1 (Wild Fire)

== China ==
- 761
- DF-21
- THP2
- THP6
- T-7, T-7A, T-7A-S2, T-7A-S, T-7/GF-01A, T-7M
- Tianying-3C
- Zhinui

== Democratic Republic of the Congo ==
- Troposphere series
  - Troposphere 1, Troposphere 2, Troposphere 3, Troposphere 4, Troposphere 5, Troposphere 6

== Egypt ==
- Al Kahir

== France ==
- Antares
- Aurore
- Belenos
- Belia
- Bélier family
  - Bélier I (Jericho), Belier II (Export), Bélier III (Vega),
- Belisama,
- Bérénice series
  - Bérénice-1, Berenice-2, Berenice-3
- Centaure family
  - Centaure (Venus) Centaure 1, Centaure 2A, Centaure 2B, Centaure 2C
- Daniel
- Dauphin
- Dragon family
  - Dragon (Stromboli), Dragon-2B, Dragon-3,
- Emma
- Epona
- Éridan
- LEX
- Meteo family
  - Meteo, Meteo-MD
- Monica family
  - Monica, Monica I, Monica IV
- Pegase
- Rubis
- Stromboli
- Tacite
- Titus
- Véronique family
  - Véronique 61, Véronique 61M, Véronique AGI, Véronique N, Véronique NA
- Vesta

== Germany ==
- Cirrus family
  - Cirrus, Cirrus I, Cirrus II
- Forschungsflugkorper
- Kumulus
- Mohr Rocket
- Poggensee
- Seliger Rocket family
  - Seliger 1, Seliger 2, Seliger 3,
- TEXUS (based on the British Skylark between 1996-2004, and the Brazilian VSB-30 from 2005-present)
- V-2

== The Netherlands ==
- T-Minus Dart
- CanSat
- Stratos series
  - Stratos I, Stratos II, Stratos II+, Stratos III

== India ==
- Rohini series
  - Menaka II
  - RH-75
  - RH-125
  - RH-200
  - RH-200SV
  - RH-300
  - RH-300/RH-200/RH-200
  - RH-300 Mk II
  - RH-560
  - RH-560 Mk II
  - RH-560/300 Mk II
- Advanced Technology Vehicle
- Vyom

== Indonesia ==
- LAPAN
- RX-250
- RX-250-LPN

== International ==
- CanSat

== Iran ==
- Kavoshgar series
  - Kavoshgar 1 (Type A)
  - Kavoshgar 2, 3 (Type B)
  - Kavoshgar 4, 5, 6, Pishgam (Type C),
  - Kavoshgar Pazhuhesh (Type D)
- Salman

== Italy ==
- Rocksanne series
  - Rocksanne I-X, Rocksanne I-X CT
  - Rocksanne II-X
  - Rocksanne E-X
  - HRE100K (Hybrid Rocket Engine 100K)
- Sispre series
  - Sispre C-41
  - Sispre BDP Meteorological
  - Sispre multi-stage geophysical

== Japan ==
- BT-310
- HM-16
- HIMES Rockoon
- JCR
- Kappa family
  - Kappa 1, Kappa 2, Kappa3, Kappa 4, Kappa 5, Kappa 6, Kappa 6H, Kappa 7, Kappa 8, Kappa 8L, Kappa 9, Kappa 9L, Kappa 9M, Kappa 10, Kappa 10C, Kappa 10S
- Lamba family
  - Lamba 2, Lamba 3, Lamba 3H
- MT-135, MT-135JA MT-135P
- NAL-7
- NAL-16
- NAL-25
- S-A
- S-B
- S-C
- SA-II
- SB-735
- ST
- S-Series family
  - S-160, S-210, S-250, S-300 ISAS, S-310, S-520, S-520-30, SS-520
- TR-1A
- TT-200
- TT-210
- TT-500, TT-500A

== Malaysia ==
- Low Satellite Level Project

== New Zealand ==
- Atea-1
- Atea-2
- HASTE
- Weka Sounding Rocket

== North Korea ==
- Hwasong 6

== Norway ==
- Pantera

== Pakistan ==
Pakistan's sounding rocket program used a variety of sounding rockets which were renamed in 3 series. Some flights were not given a Pakistani designation. Sounding rockets were flown from the Sonmiani Rocket Range.

- Rehbar series
  - Nike-Apache
  - Nike-Cajun
  - Petrel
  - Skua
  - Centaure
  - Judi-Dart
- Rehnuma series
  - Centaure
  - Judi-Dart
- Shahpar series
  - Centaure
  - Dragon

== Poland ==
- Meteor, family, Meteor-1, Meteor-2H, Meteor-2K, Meteor-3
- ILR-33 AMBER

== Russia ==
- M-100, M-100 (A1) M-100A M-100B
- MERA
- MMR06
- MR-1 Meteo
- MR-12
- MR-20
- MR-25
- MR-30
- MT-135
- W-1B (R-1B), W-1D (R-1D), (W-1E (R-1E), W-1W (R-1W) Geophysical Rockets
- R-2A
- R-5A, R-5V (Vertikal)
- R-11A
- V-3V
- Vertical-4
- W-2A (R-2)

== Spain ==
- INTA-100
- INTA-255
- INTA-300, INTA-300B
- PLD Space Miura 1

== South Korea ==
- Blackbird
- HANBIT-TLV
- KARI KSR-I
- KARI KSR-II
- KARI KSR-III

== Sweden ==
- MASER
- MAXUS
- REXUS (derived from the American Improved Orion)

== Switzerland ==
- Micon Zenit

== Taiwan ==
- Sounding Rocket

== United Kingdom ==
- Skua family
  - Skua 1, Skua 2, Skua 3, Skua 4
- Petrel family
  - Petrel 1, Petrel 2
- Skylark family
  - Skylark 1, Skylark 2, Skylark 2 AC, Skylark 2C, Skylark 3, Skylark 3 AC, Skylark 4, Skylark 4 AC, Skylark 5, Skylark 5C, Skylark 6, Skylark 6 AC, Skylark 7, Skylark 7 AC, Skylark 7C, Skylark 8, Skylark 9, Skylark 10 (Skylark 10A), Skylark 11, Skylark 12, Skylark 12 AC, Skylark 14, Skylark 15, Skylark 16, Skylark 17,
- Fulmar

== United States ==
- Aerobee family,
  - Aerobee RTV-N-8 (N-8a1, RTV-8 and Aerojet XASR-SC-1, all with the XASR-SC-1 engine )
  - X-8 (RTV-A-1, RTV-N-10, and Aerojet XAR-SC-2, all with the Aerojet XASR-SC-1 engine)
  - Aerobee X-8A, (RTV-A-1a, RTV-N-10a, with Aerojet AJ10-25 engine),
  - Aerobee X-8B, (RTV-A-1b with Aerojet XAR-SC-1 engine - a test vehicle)
  - Aerobee X-8C (RTV-A-1c, with the Aerojet AJ10-25 engine)
  - Aerobee X-8D (RTV-A-1d, Aerojet AJ10-25 - apparently never launched)
  - Aerobee RTV-N-10b, with the Aerojet AJ10-24 engine
  - Aerobee RTV-N-10c, with the Aerojet AJ10-34 engine
  - Aerobee AJ10-25 with the AJ10-25 engine,
  - Aerobee AJ10-27 with the AJ10-27 engine,
  - Aerobee AJ10-34, with the AJ10-34 engine,
  - Aerobee 75 (Aerobee Hawk)
  - Aerobee 100 (Aerobee Junior)
  - Aerobee 150 (Aerobee-Hi, PWN-2), Aerobee 150 MI, Aerobee 150 MII Aerobee 150 MII 20 Aerobee 150A, Aerobee 150A MII
  - Aerobee 170 (Nike-Aerobee,), Areobee 170A
  - Aerobee 200, Aerobee 200A,
  - Aerobee 300 (Sparrowbee also Spaerobee), Aerobee 300A
  - Aerobee 350
- Aims-1
- Apache
- APEP
- Ascamp
- Aspan 300
- Arcas, Arcas-Robin, Rooster, Super Arcas
- Archer (PWN-4)
- Argo A-1 (Percheron)
- Argus
- Aries
- Ascamp
- Asp I,
- Asp Apache
- Astrobee family
  - Astrobee, Astrobee D, Astrobee F, Astrobee 200, Astrobee 500, Astrobee 1500
- Athena RTV
- ATK LV
- Bullpup Apache
- Bullpup Cajun
- Blue Scout Junior
- Boosted Arcas, Boosted Arcas II,
- Boosted Dart
- Bumper
- Cajun
- Cajun Dart
- Caleb (Project Hi-Ho)
- Castor
- Castor Lance
- CleanSweep III, Cleansweep IIIA
- Dac Roc
- Deacon Arrow II
- Deacon Judi
- Doorknob 1
- Doorknob 2
- Exos (PWN-4)
- GoFast
- Gold Chain Cowboy
- Hasp I, HASP II, HASP III
- HJ (Honest John) Hydac,
- HJ Nike Hydac,
- HJ Nike Javelin,
- HJ Nike,
- HJ Nike Nike (Boa),
- HJ Orion
- Honest John-Tommahawk
- Hopi Dart
- HPB
- Hydra-Iris
- Hydra Sandhawk
- Improved Malemute
- Improved Orion
- Iris
- Javelin (Argo D-4), Javelin III
- Jaguar
- Journeyman (Argo D-8)
- Judy-Dart
- Kitty (PWN-6, Sidewinder-HV Arcas)
- Kiva/Hopi (Phoenix)
- LCLV
- Loki (PWN-1)
- Loki II (Hawk)
- Loki Dart (Loki-Wasp, XRM-82, PWN-1A, also PWN-8 PWN-8B, PWN-10, PWN-11, PWN-12 Loki Datasonde)
- Loki-Wasp
- Malemute
- Mesquito
- Microstar
- Nike family
  - Nike, Nike Apache, Nike Hydac, Nike Iroquois (Niro), Nike Javelin, Nike Javelin 3, Nike Nike (Python), Nike Orion, Nike Orion Improved, Nike Tomahawk, Nike Viper 1, Nike Yardbird, Nike Cajun (PWN-3 a.k.a. CAN), Nike-Deacon (DAN), Nike Hawk, Nike Genie, Nike Smoke
- Oriole family
  - Oriole, Oreole, Oriole I (Loki-Dart), Oreole II (Terrier-Oriole), Oriole III (Talos Terrier Mk 70 Oreole), Oriole IIIA (Terrier Oriole Nihka), Oriole IV (Talos Terrier Mk 70 Oreole Nihka),
- Orion, Improved Orion
- Owl
- Ozarca
- Paiute Apache
- Paiute Tomahawk
- Pegasus
- Peregrine
- Phoenix
- Prospector
- Purr-Kee
- PWN-5 Rocksonde 200
- PWN-8 Loki Datasonde, PWN-B, PWN-C, PWN-D
- PWN-10 Super Loki Datasonde, PWN-10A
- PWN-11 Super Loki Datasond, PWN-11A, PWN-11D (Datasonde)
- PWN-11 Super Loki Datasonde
- PWN-12 Super Loki ROBIN
- Raven
- Rockoon family, Deacon-Rockoon, Farside, HIMES Rockoon, Loki Rockoon, Hawk Rockoon
- Roksonde family
- Rooster (PWN-7)
- Seagull
- Sandhawk
- Sandhawk Tomahawk (Dualhawk)
- Sarge (under development)
- Sergeant Sounding Rocket
- Sergeant-Delta
- Sergeant Hydac
- Scout X-2
- Scanner
- Sirocco
- Sidewinder Arcas,
- Space Data LCLV
- SpaceLoft XL,
- Sparoair I
- Sparrow Arcas,
- Strongarm
- Strypi, Strypi IIAR, Strypi IIR, Strypi IV, Strypi VIIAR,
- Strypi-Tommahawk
- Super Arcas
- Super Chief, Super Chief II, Super Chief III
- Super Loki
- Super Loki Dart, PWN-10A, PWN-10B (Super Loki Datasonde), PWN-11 (Super Loki Datasonde), PWN-12, (Super Loki Robin)
- Talos Castor
- Talos Sergeant Hydac
- Talos Terrier Black Brant
- Talos Terrier Black Brant-Nihka
- Talos Terrier Oriole (Oriole 3)
- Talos Terrier Oriole Nihka (Oriole 4)
- Talos Terrier Perrgrine
- Taurus Orion
- Taurus Tomahawk
- Taurus Tomahawk Nike (Taurus-Nike-Tommahawk)
- Terasca
- Terarapin
- Terrier
- Terrier /551
- Terrier Asp (Tarp)
- Terrier ASROC Cajun (TERESCA)
- Terrier Black Brant
- Terrier Improved Orion
- Terrier Malemute, Terrier Improved Malemute (Terrier Mk.70 Patriot)
- Terrier Improved Nihka
- Terrier Oriole Nihka
- Terrier Orion, Terrier Improved Orion
- Terrier Perrgrine
- Terrier Sandhawk
- Terrier Sounding Rocket
- Terrier Tomahawk
- Tiamat
- Tic
- Tomahawk
- Tomahawk Sandia
- Ute
- Ute Apache
- Ute Tomahawk
- V-2
- Viking, Viking Type 9
- Viper Dart, Viper IIA, Viper 3A/10D Dart, Viper V/Dart
- Viper Falcon
- Wac Corporal
- Wasp
- X-15A
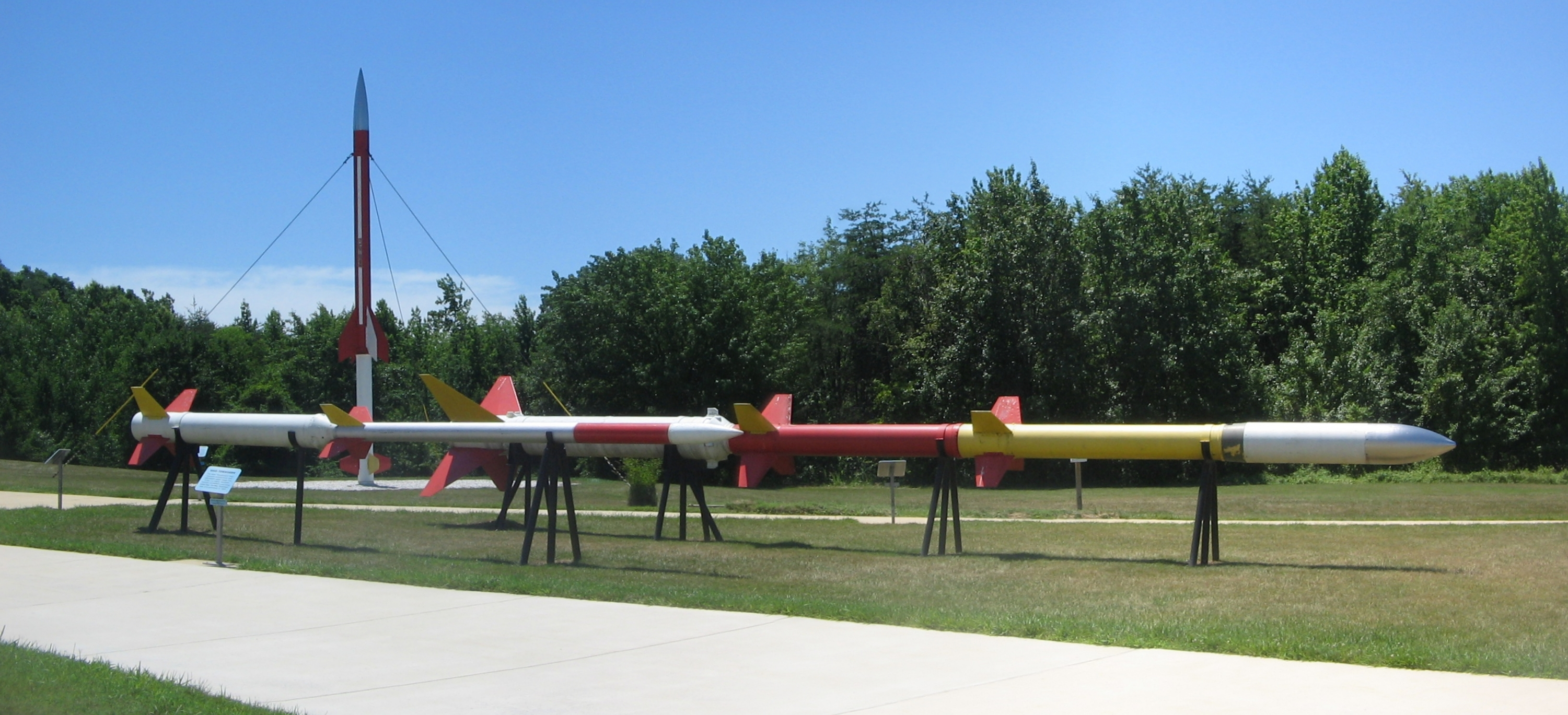
Photo of the three sounding rockets in the rocket garden behind the Visitor Center at NASA's Goddard Space Flight Center in Green Belt, Maryland, USA. At left is a vertical Black Brant VIII Sounding Rocket, with a horizontal Argo D-4 Javelin and horizontal Nike Tomahawk in front.

== Vietnam ==
- TV-01
- TV-02

== See also ==
- List of orbital launch systems
- Amateur rocketry
