= Stromboli (disambiguation) =

Stromboli is a volcanic island off the north coast of Sicily, Italy.

Stromboli may also refer to:

- Mount Stromboli, a volcano on the island

== Film ==
- Stromboli (1950 film), a Roberto Rossellini film starring Ingrid Bergman
- Stromboli (2022 film), a Dutch film released by Netflix
- Stromboli (Disney), one of the villains in the 1940 Disney film Pinocchio

== Ships ==
- Stromboli-class replenishment oiler, oilers used by the Marina Militare since 1975
- HMS Strombolo, also HMS Stromboli, the name of eight ships of the Royal Navy
- USS Stromboli, the name given to three 19th-century US Navy ships
- USS Wassuc (1865), American naval ship renamed USS Stromboli
- Italian cruiser Stromboli, a cruiser of the Italian Regia Marina (Royal Navy) built in the 1880s
- Italian ship Stromboli

== Other ==
- Stromboli (food), a type of turnover in the pizza family
- Stromboli (gastropod), a genus of sea snails
- Nervures Stromboli, a French paraglider
- 26761 Stromboli, an asteroid
- Stromboli, a 2018 novel by Saskia Noort
- Stromboli, the last surviving locomotive of South Devon Railway's GWR Banking Class
- Stromboli, a French solid rocket engine, powering the Aigle, Dragon, Dauphin and Éridan sounding rockets.
