= Tacite (rocket) =

French single stage sounding rocket

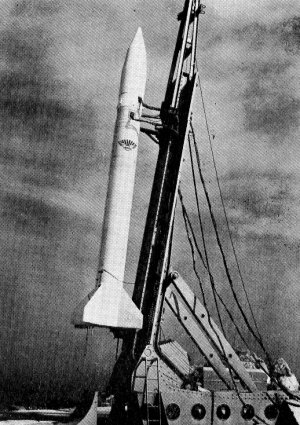
Tacite french sounding rocket.

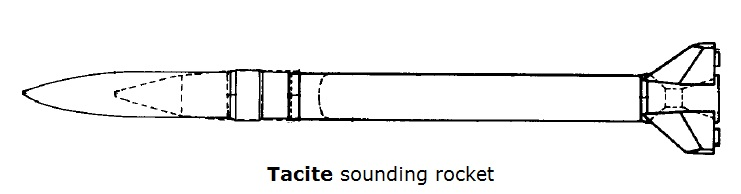
Tacite sounding rocket scheme.

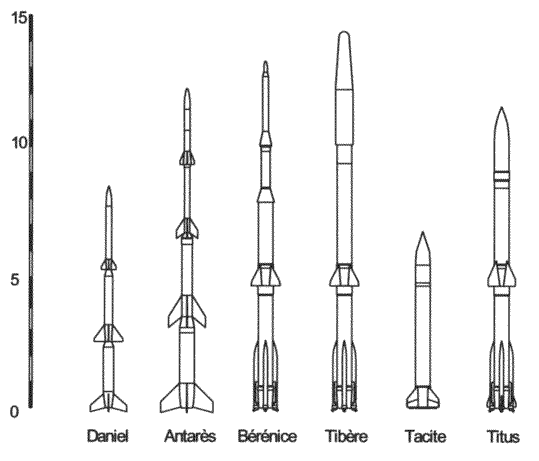
Tacite (fifth rocket) as part of the Onera sounding rocket family.

The inaugural member of ONERA sounding rockets fleet, the Tacite (Tentative d'Analyse du Contraste Infrarouge Terre-Espace, for Attempt to Analyze the Earth-Space Infrared Contrast), was a single-stage vehicle, used between 1965 and 1968.

== Description ==
Designed and developed by the Office national d'études et de recherches aérospatiales (ONERA), it was a single-stage vehicle equipped with a SEPR 739-2 Stromboli engine fueled by ‘Plastoline’ propellant, offering a propulsion duration of 20 seconds. The rocket incorporates small nitrogen ejection nozzles to induce rotation and employs aerodynamic stabilization by a cruciform tailfin.

With a total mass of 1738 kg (excluding the useful tip), Tacite reached a height of nearly 8 meters. It had the capability to propel a 285 kg payload to an altitude of 160 km.

== Launches ==
Operational between 1965 and 1968, this rocket underwent four launches, experiencing one failure.

Date	Launch site	Mission Description	Agency	Apogee (km)
1965 June 15	Biscarosse	Infrared Horizon Study Aeronomy	ONERA	182
1967 Nov 23	Ile du Levant	FU-169 X-ray astronomy	CNES	Failure
1968 May 15	Ile du Levant	Earth Infrared Aeronomy	CNES	175
1968 Oct 15	Ile du Levant	Sun pointing test / Solar observations	CNES	140

== See also ==
- Tibère (rocket)
- Bèrènice
- Antarès (OPd-56-39-22D)
- Mélanie (rocket)
- Veronique (rocket)
- French space program
