= C-41 (rocket) =

C-41 was a two-stage Italian-built rocket, 75 kg (165 lb) in weight, part of a program to develop probe carrying rockets to study outer atmosphere. It was first launched on July 9, 1960, from the Salto di Quirra range. The project was managed by Lt.Col. Metallo (DGAM—Direzione Generali Armi e Munizioni) and Engineer Angeloni (SISPRE—Societa Italiana Sviluppo Propulsione a Reazione (Italian Society of Studies on Jet Propulsion)).
To cut costs the C-41 recycled parts of existing weaponry. The first stage was powered by a cluster of four jets featuring interconnected combustion chambers. The payload carrying second stage was powered by a single engine of the same type. On the whole six C-41 were launched successfully.
Successive development of probe carrying rockets was the task of the newly formed Space Research Committee within the CNR (Italian National Research Institution). The committee's president was the founder of Italian astronautics, Luigi Broglio.

== See also ==
- Italian Space Agency

== Bibliography ==
- L’Aeronautica Militare e lo spazio dagli albori agli albori agli anni ’70, Rivista Aeronautica 6/2003
- AA.VV:, Le attività spaziali italiane dal dopoguerra all’istituzione dell’Agenzia Spaziale Italiana, Agenzia Spaziale Europea
