= CERES Ile du Levant =

French suborbital rocket launch site

- Centre d'Essais et de Recherches d'Engins Spéciaux
- Ile du Levant
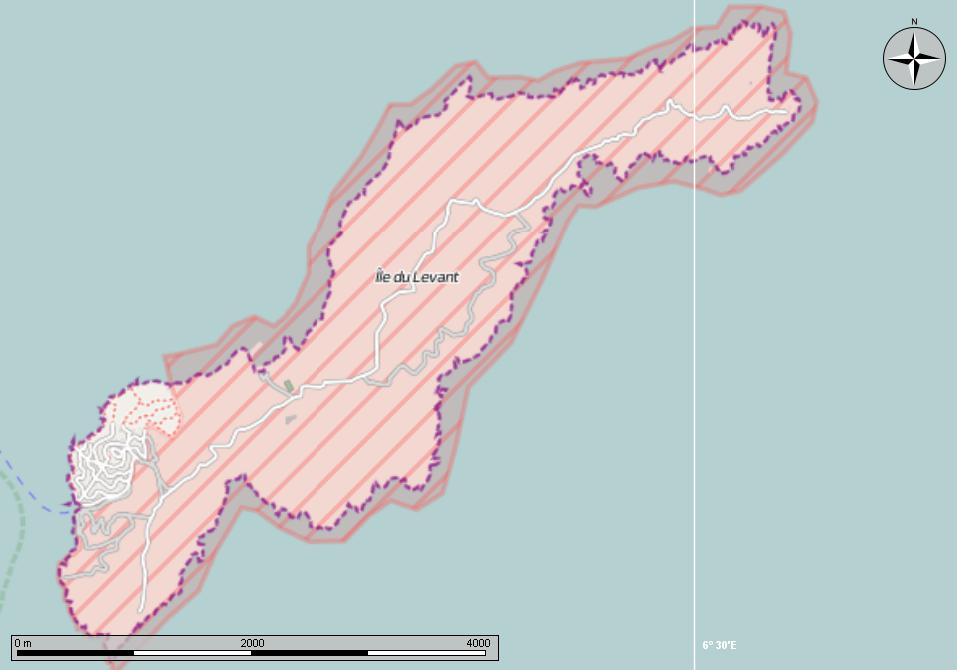
- Open Street Map from the Marble program of the Ile du Levant, a French Military base. The red areas are the "military" parts of the island.

Site information
- Type: rocket launch site
- Operator: ONERA, CNES, ESRO

Location
- Location in France
- Coordinates: 43.05°N 6.48°E

Site history
- In use: 1956 to 1968

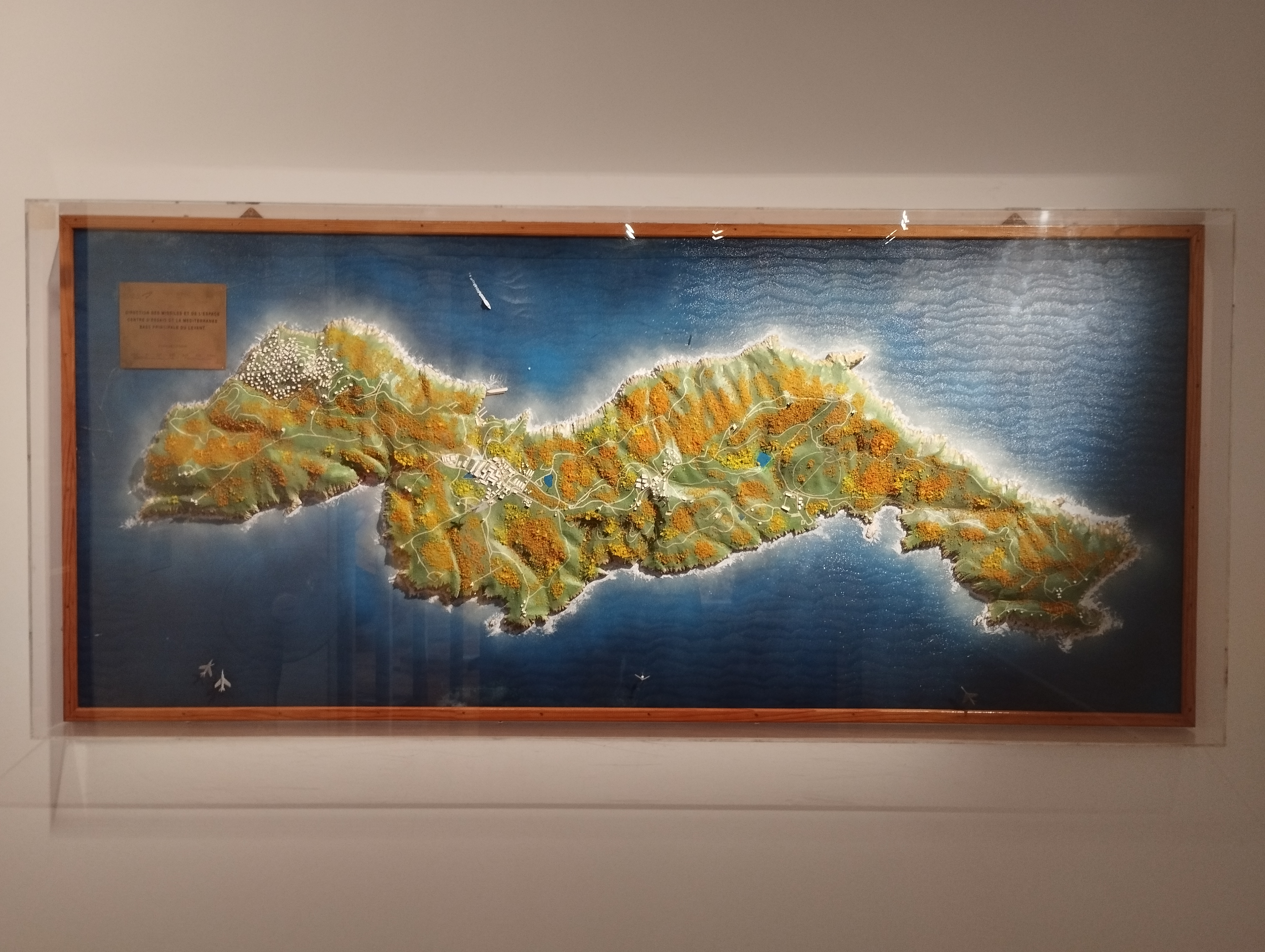
Île du Levant (1980 model)

CERES ("Centre d'Essais et de Recherches d'Engins Spéciaux" for "Special Weapons Research and Tests Center") Ile du Levant was a French suborbital rocket launch site, located at Ile du Levant, and active between 1956 and 1968. CERES played a pivotal role in testing a wide array of tactical missiles used in France, as well as conducting tests for sounding rockets on behalf of CNES and ESRO. Additionally, the center was involved in experiments with ONERA and SEREB experimental vehicles, solidifying its significance in the realm of missile research and testing.

== History ==
In the early 1950s, a military missile test site was established at the French naval base on the Ile du Levant, an offshore island in the Mediterranean near Toulon. Known as CERES, it replaced a beach site at Pampelonne used for launches since 1948.

This facility served as a Naval Air Force base throughout the 1950s, testing missiles not only for the Navy but also for other branches of the armed forces. On September 1, 1968, it merged with other institutions for form CEM (Centre d'Essais de la Méditerranée or Mediterranean Test Center).

== Launches ==
More than one hundred vehicles were launched from Ile du Levant, including sounding rockets such as Monica, Daniel, Antarès, Bélier, Agate, Centaure, Bérénice, Belenos, LEX, MD-620, Tacite, MSBS M112, MSBS M011, Dauphin, Belisama, Epona and Grannos.

Sounding rockets launched by year from Ile du Levant
Year	Detail
1959	3 Antarès, 1 Daniel
1960	6 Antarès
1961	3 Antarès, 2 Daniel
1962	5 Bélier, 4 Bérénice, 7 Centaure
1963	2 Agate, 1 Bélier, 2 Bérénice, 1 Centaure
1964	2 Agate, 1 Bélier, 4 Bérénice, 3 Centaure, 1 LEX
1965	1 Bérénice, 5 Centaure, 3 LEX, 1 Tacite
1966	1 Bérénice
1967	1 Dauphin, 4 LEX, 1 Tacite
1968	2 Tacite
1969	2 Centaure
