= Daniel (rocket) =

- Function: Experimental rocket
- Manufacturer: ONERA
- Country of origin: France

Size
- Height: 8.4 m (28 ft)
- Diameter: 0.4 m (1 ft 4 in)
- Mass: 1,000 kg (2,200 lb)
- Stages: 3

Associated rockets
- Derivative work: Jericho (missile)

Launch history
- Status: Retired
- Launch sites: CERES - Ile de Levant
- Total launches: 3
- Success(es): 3

First stage – SPRAN-50
- Height: 2.5 m (8 ft 2 in)
- Diameter: 0.4 m (1 ft 4 in)
- Gross mass: 400 kg (880 lb)
- Burn time: 5.6 s

Second stage – Jericho

Third stage – Melanie
- Height: 1.60 m (5 ft 3 in)
- Diameter: 0.16 m (6.3 in)
- Empty mass: 10 kg (22 lb)
- Gross mass: 32 kg (71 lb)
- Propellant mass: 22 kg (49 lb)
- Maximum thrust: 11.10 kN (2,500 lb_{f})
- Specific impulse: 227 seconds (2.23 km/s)
- Burn time: 4.4 s
- Propellant: Solid

Daniel (OPD-220-ADX) is the designation for a French experimental rocket, a precursor to the Israeli Jericho ballistic missile.

== Description ==
It consisted of 3 stages: a SPRAN-50 first stage, a Jericho second stage and a Mélanie third stage. Daniel was capable of reaching a maximum altitude of 130 km and had a takeoff weight of 1000 kg, a diameter of 0.40 m and a length of 8.40 m

== Launches ==
Daniel was launched three times between 1959 and 1961 by ONERA from Centre d'Essais et de Recherches d'Engins Speciaux - Ile de Levant.

Daniel launches
Date	Mission	Apogee
1959 January 27	Atmosphere radioactivity	127 km (78 mi)
1961 October 5	Test / aeronomy mission	130 km (80 mi)
1961 October 9	Test / aeronomy mission	130 km (80 mi)

== See also ==
- ONERA
- Bérénice
