= LEX (sounding rocket) =

French experimental sounding rocket

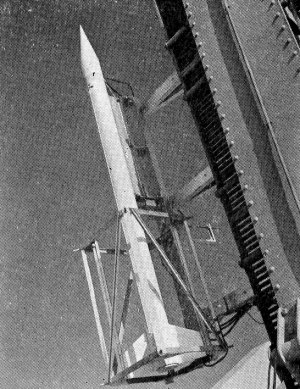
LEX French sounding rocket

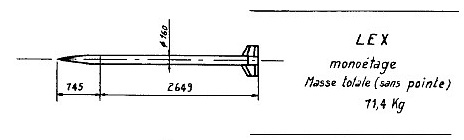
LEX sounding rocket diagram

LEX (French: Lithergol EXpérimentale) was a French experimental hybrid-propellant sounding rocket, developed by ONERA. It had the objective of testing a lithergol fueled rocket engine (an hybrid mixture of solid and liquid propellants - Nylon-metatolueneamine as fuel and mixture of nitric acid and nitrogen tetroxide as oxidizer). It was the first rocket in history to use this technology, flying 8 times between 1964 and 1967.

The rocket had a single stage with a thrust of 10.00 kN (MT.27 hybrid rocket motor), a gross mass of 100 kg, a height of 3.40 m, and a diameter of 0.16 m, reaching an apogee of 115 km.

== Launches ==
All LEX launches were carried out from CERES Ile du Levant.

The first LEX-01 launch on 25 April 1964 was a partial success, with the payload consisting of a telemetry transmitter.

Three LEX-02 rockets were fired on 1 June 1965. One of these rockets, with an initial mass of 78 kg, reached an altitude of 68 km.

Four LEX-02-B launches occurred on 1 November 1967. Two were intended as technological tests and two others as actual payload launches. These carried the SECT Meteo meteorological payloads, reaching an altitude of more than 100 km, with a parachute ensuring a correct descent for 31 minutes allowing wind measurements over a wide range of altitudes.

LEX sounding rocket launches
Flight no.	Version	Launch date (UTC)	Payload(s)	Apogee	Notes
1	LEX-01	25 April 1964	Telemetry transmitter	1 km	First flight of LEX (partial failure due to residues in the engine)
2	LEX-02	June 1965	Telemetry transmitter	68 km	First flight of LEX-02
3	LEX-02	June 1965	Telemetry transmitter	60 km	
4	LEX-02	June 1965	Telemetry transmitter	60 km	Last flight of LEX-02
5	LEX-02B	November 1967	Telemetry transmitter	101 km	First flight of LEX-02B
6	LEX-02B	November 1967	SECT Meteo	80 km	
7	LEX-02B	November 1967	SECT Meteo	115 km	
8	LEX-02B	November 1967	SECT Meteo	115 km	LEX's last flight

== See also ==
- Bérénice (rocket)
- Mélanie (rocket)
- Veronique (rocket)
- French space program
