= DGA Essais de missiles =

French rocket test site

- between Biscarrosse and the Atlantic Ocean

Site information
- Type: rocket launch site

Location
- Location in France
- Coordinates: 44°27′N 1°15′W

Site history
- Built: 1967

DGA Essais de missiles (previously named CEL - Centre d'Essais des Landes) is a launch site for the test of military rockets and for launching sounding rockets in France. "DGA Essais de missiles" is situated between Biscarrosse and the Atlantic Ocean. "DGA Essais de missiles" went in service in 1967 as replacement for the former launch sites at CIEES, Hammaguir.

A large number of rockets were tested from this site: Belier III, Dragon 1, Dragon 2B, Dragon 3, Rubis, Tacite, SSBS S112, Cora, Dauphin, SSBS S01, MSBS M012, MSBS M013, SSBS S02, Black Brant VC, MSBS M1, Tibère, Viper 3A, Forschungsflugkörper, MSBS M2, SSBS S2, MSBS M20, SSBS S3, Nike Orion, MSBS M4, Hades, Black Brant 9CM1, MSBS M45 and MSBS M51.

== Pads ==
The most important launch pad of the Centre d'Essais des Landes is:

- Base Lancement Balistique at 44.3620°N 1.2500°W, from which most medium-range rockets were launched.

Other pads include:

- CE (Black Brant VC, Black Brant 9CM1) at 44.39°N 1.23°W,
- BESA - Base Experimentale Sol-Air - at 44.39°N 1.23°W,
- SUD - Pas de tir Sud - at 44.30°N 1.28°W,
- BE - Base Espace - at 44.27°N 1.27°W,
- BP - Base Pluton - at 44.38°N 1.24°W
- BS - Base Scientifique - at 44.29°N 1.27°W.
