= Melanie (disambiguation) =

Melanie is a feminine given name.

Melanie may also refer to:

== Music ==
=== Albums ===
- Affectionately Melanie, album by Melanie Safka originally released as Melanie
- Melanie (album), by Celine Dion

=== Songs ===
- "Melanie" (song), by "Weird Al" Yankovic
- "Melanie", by Donna Summer on the album I'm a Rainbow
- "Melanie", by Guster on the album Goldfly
- "Melanie", by Toto on the album Mindfields

== Other uses ==
- Melanie (singer) (Melanie Anne Safka-Schekeryk, 1947–2024), American pop singer
- Mélanie (rocket), a French rocket engine
- Melanie (film), a Canadian film
