= Tibère =

Three-stage French experimental rocket

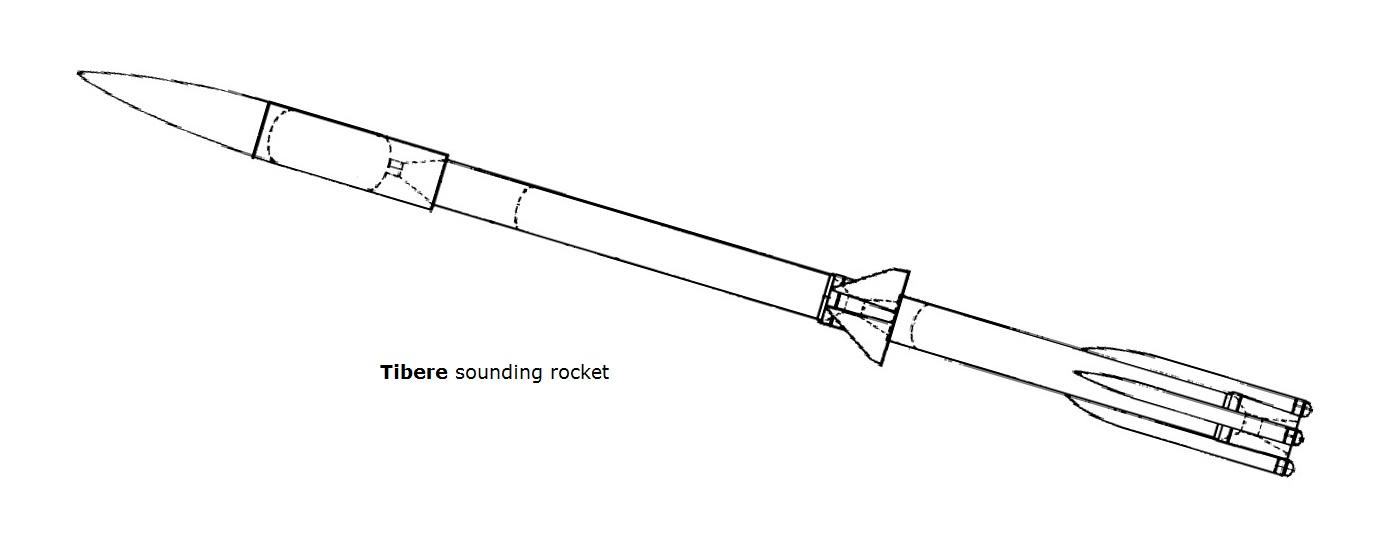
Tibère sounding rocket scheme.

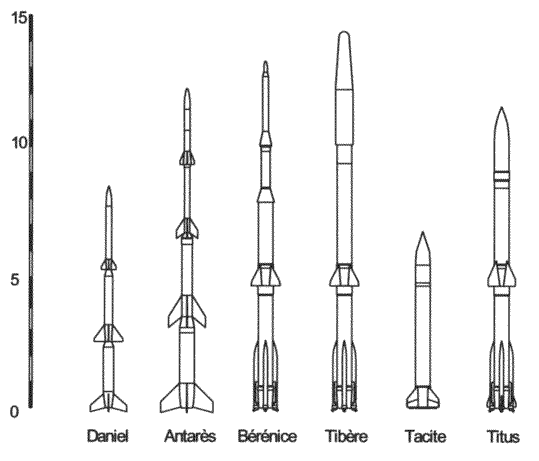
Tibère (fourth rocket) as part of the Onera sounding rocket family.

Tibère was a French atmospheric reentry test rocket developed by O.N.E.R.A. (Office National d'Etudes et de Recherches Aérospatiales). It evolved from its predecessor, Bèrènice, with development initiated in 1965 to support the ELECTRE reentry experiment program. Tibère, standing at a height of 14.5 m and weighing 4.5 tons, operated as a three-stage rocket.

== Description ==
The first stage comprised a SEPR-739-2 Stromboli, that, similar to Bèrènice and Titus, was encircled by four SEPR-P167 stabilization rockets. This was followed by another SEPR-739-2 Stromboli for the second stage, and the third stage housed a P.064 inherited from Diamant A.

The firing of the initial two stages during ascent propelled the upper composite (3rd stage + payload) to reach an altitude of 150 km. The Cassiopée attitude control system precisely oriented the composite before the P.064 motor accelerated it to high speed during descent from 130 to 60 km altitude. The experiment itself occurred between 60 and 20 km, lasting ten seconds until the payload destruction.

== Launches ==
Despite the procurement of four Tibère units, only two flights were executed from Biscarrosse, occurring on February 23, 1971, and March 18, 1972.

== See also ==
- Bérénice
- Antarès (OPd-56-39-22D)
- Mélanie (rocket)
- Veronique (rocket)
- French space program
