= Forschungsflugkörper =

The Forschungsflugkörper (German for research aircraft or missile) was a West German sounding rocket manufactured by ERNO from 1972 to 1974 for the German Aerospace Center (DLR). It was launched three times by MORABA, from the Centre d'Essais des Landes, French Army launch site near Biscarosse. Only the last flight was successful, reaching the apogee of 120 km, just above the Kármán line. It was a single stage rocket with a weight of 300 kg, a length of 4.00 metres, a core diameter of 0.25 metres.

== Launch history ==
Date	Flight	Function	Launch site	Apogee	Outcome	Remarks
10 October 1972 14:00 GMT	DLR C-FFK-45	Test flight	Biscarosse	0 km	Failure	
24 October 1972 15:00 GMT	DLR C-FFK-46	Test flight	Biscarosse	0 km	Failure	
7 May 1974 13:00 GMT	DLR C-FFK-47	Test flight	Biscarosse	120 km	Success	
