= USS Stromboli =

USS Stromboli has been the name of three ships in the service of the United States Navy. All have been named for the island of Stromboli in the Tyrrhenian Sea.

- USS Stromboli (1846) was a brig originally named Howard, that was purchased by the Navy in 1846. She served during the Mexican–American War as part of the blockade fleet. She was decommissioned on 6 September 1848 and sold later that year.
- The second Stromboli was the original name for USS Spuyten Duyvil, a torpedo boat built in 1864 for service toward the end of the American Civil War.
- USS Stromboli (1869) was the name briefly held by USS Wassuc, a monitor, in 1869.
