= Las Palmas, Argentina =

Las Palmas
- Lapachito, Chaco
- Chaco province, 35 km east of Resistencia

Site information
- Type: rocket launch site
- Operator: CNES, CNIE

Location
- Location in Argentina
- Coordinates: 27.13°S 58.75°W

Site history
- In use: November 12, 1966

Las Palmas (also mentioned as Lapachito and Chaco) is a rocket launch site in Argentina at 27.13°S 58.75°W used on November 12, 1966, for the launch of two Titus rockets for observing a solar eclipse.

The site is located in the steppes of the Las Palmas region in the east of the Chaco province, 35 km east of the city of Resistencia (itself located about a thousand kilometers north of the Argentine capital Buenos Aires).

It had no previous facilities, so rocket assembly halls (300 m2), a science building (320 m2), trajectory centers, a command post, launch infrastructure, telemetry stations and the power system were set.

The choice of this location was justified firstly by the fact that the region was crossed by the eclipse. Secondly, the existence of a natural environment allowing the recovery of rocket nose cones, with the impact zone clear of vegetation for better detection and recovery.

== Launches ==
Two successful Titus rocket launches occurred on November 12, 1966, in collaboration between CNES and the Argentinian agency CNIE.

| Date | Mission Description | Apogee (km) |
|---|---|---|
| November 12, 1966 | FU-150 A Solar Eclipse mission | 274 |
| November 12, 1966 | FU-150 B Solar Eclipse mission | 270 |
