= Titus (rocket) =

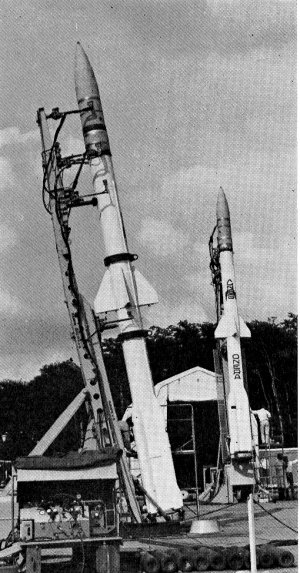
Titus French sounding rocket.

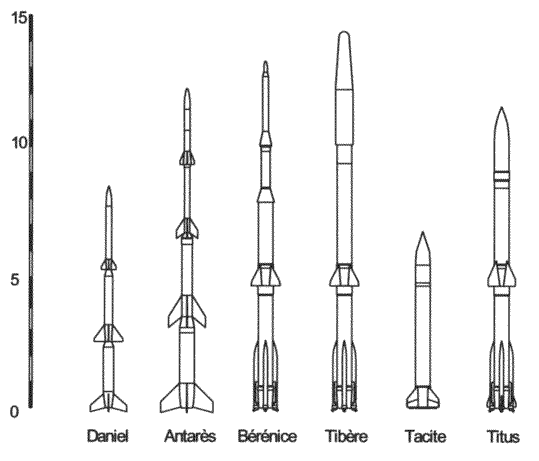
Titus (last rocket) as part of the Onera sounding rocket family.

The Titus sounding rocket was developed specifically by ONERA for observing the solar corona and conducting spectral analysis of the Sun's ultraviolet rays during the November 1966 solar eclipse in Argentina. The two-stage rocket, standing just over 11.5 meters tall and weighing 3045 kg without payload, could launch 400 kg to an altitude of 250 km.

== Description ==
Titus was derived from the initial two stages of the Bérénice test vehicle.

The first stage, weighing 1935 kg, used a SEPR-739-2 Stromboli solid rocket motor with 1245 kg of Plastolane propellant with a 20-second burn time. The second stage, weighing 1110 kg, utilized a SEPR-740-3 Stromboli motor with 738 kg of Plastolane propellant with a 20-second combustion duration.

Stabilization involved four SEPR-P167 stabilization rockets with adjustable nozzles around the first stage, while the second stage had four fixed tailplanes. Accuracy was within a few degrees, necessary for a precise trajectory vital for the experiments. A launch at 85 degrees with a 381 kg tip, after wind correction, resulted in a distortion of 2.5 km for the first stage and 1.5 km for the second stage. The rocket's control was managed by system named "Pascal".

== Launches ==
Two successful Titus rocket launches occurred on November 12, 1966, from the Las Palmas Chaco firing range in Argentina, in collaboration between CNES and the Argentinian agency CNIE.

Date	Mission Description	Apogee (km)
November 12, 1966	FU-150 A Solar Eclipse mission	274
November 12, 1966	FU-150 B Solar Eclipse mission	270
