= Dragon (rocket) =

- Country of origin: France
- Application: high altitude research

sounding rocket

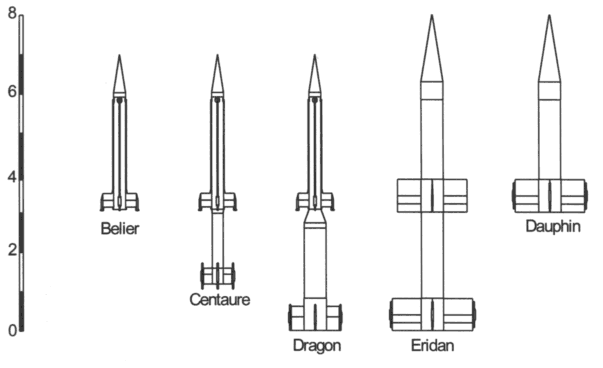
Sud-Aviation Belier rocket family.

The Dragon is a two-stage French solid propellant sounding rocket used for high altitude research between 1962 and 1973. It belonged thereby to a family of solid-propellant rockets derived from the Bélier, including the Centaure, the Dauphin and the Éridan.

The dragon's first stage was a Stromboli engine (diameter 56 cm) which burned 675 kg of propellant in 16 seconds and so produced a maximum thrust of 88 kN. Versions of the Bélier engine were used as upper stages.

A payload of 30 to 120 kg could be carried on parabolic with apogees between 440 km (270 mi) (Dragon-2B) and 560 km (340 mi)(Dragon-3)

== Versions ==
The Dragon was built in several versions including the Dragon-2B, and Dragon-3:

Version	Stages	Gross mass (kg)	Height (m)	Diameter (m)	Apogee (km)	Payload (kg)
Dragon	Stromboli + Belier I	1157	7.10	0.56	475	60
Dragon-2B	Stromboli + Belier II	1200	7	0.56	440	
Dragon-3	Stromboli + Belier III	1190	8.16	0.56	560	60

== Launches ==
Dragons have been launched from Andøya, Biscarrosse, Dumont d'Urville, CELPA (El Chamical), CIEES, Kerguelen Islands, Kourou, Salto di Quirra, Sonmiani, Thumba, and Vík í Mýrdal between 1962 and 1973.

Date	Launch site	Launch Complex	Launch Vehicle	Mission Description	Nation	Agency	Apogee (km)
1962 December 5	Hammaguira	Hammaguira Bacchus	Dragon 1	Failure	France	CNES	80
1963 April 26	Hammaguira	Hammaguira Bacchus	Dragon 1	Failure	France	CNES	58
1963 October 30	Hammaguira	Hammaguira Bacchus	Dragon 1	Test mission	France	CNES	470
1964 February 10	Hammaguira	Hammaguira Bacchus	Dragon 1	Test mission	France	CNES	470
1964 April 11	Hammaguira	Hammaguira Bacchus	Dragon 1	FU-104B Probe / Na Aeronomy mission	France	CNES	400
1964 April 13	Hammaguira	Hammaguira Bacchus	Dragon 1	FU-104B Probe / Na Aeronomy mission	France	CNES	425
1964 August 1	Vik	-	Dragon 1	FU-125 ionosphere / particles Aeronomy /ionosphere mission	France	CNES	440
1964 August 7	Vik	-	Dragon 1	FU-125 ionosphere / particles Aeronomy /ionosphere mission	France	CNES	420
1964 December 3	Hammaguira	Hammaguira Bacchus	Dragon 1	FU-103B MPE Ba-11 Aeronomy mission	France	CNES	390
1965 August 24	Vik	-	Dragon 1	FU-146 / VLF Aeronomy /ionosphere mission	France	CNES	440
1965 September 3	Vik	-	Dragon 1	FU-146 / VLF Aeronomy /ionosphere mission	France	CNES	451
1965 November 20	Hammaguira	Hammaguira Bechar	Dragon 1	MPE Ba-16? Aeronomy mission	France	CNES	404
1966 January 21	Hammaguira	Hammaguira Bacchus	Dragon 1	FU-133 Sodium release Aeronomy mission	France	CNES	500
1966 May 4	Hammaguira	Hammaguira Bacchus	Dragon 1	FU-130 Lyra alpha Aeronomy / chemical / lyra-alpha spectrometry mission	France	CNES	440
1966 May 12	Hammaguira	Hammaguira Bacchus	Dragon 1	FU-130 Lyra alpha Aeronomy mission	France	CNES	464
1966 May 23	Hammaguira	Hammaguira Bacchus	Dragon 1	FU-131 Atomic Hydrogen Aeronomy mission	France	CNES	460
1966 May 26	Andoya	-	Dragon 1	Failure	France	CNES	230
1966 June 1	Andoya	-	Dragon 1	FU-153 ionosphere / particles Ionosphere mission	France	CNES	380
1966 June 14	Hammaguira	Hammaguira Bacchus	Dragon 1	FU-131 Atomic Hydrogen Aeronomy mission	France	CNES	480
1966 June 15	Hammaguira	Hammaguira Bacchus	Dragon 1	FU-131 Sodium release Aeronomy mission	France	CNES	500
1966 June 16	Andoya	-	Dragon 1	Failure	France	CNES	60
1966 October 17	Andoya	-	Dragon 1	FU-165 Ions / Electric Field Ionosphere mission	France	CNES	387
1967 January 25	Dumont d'Urville	-	Dragon 1	FU-145B ionosphere / particles Ionosphere mission	France	CNES	340
1967 January 28	Dumont d'Urville	-	Dragon 1	FU-151 ionosphere / particles Ionosphere mission	France	CNES	310
1967 January 29	Dumont d'Urville	-	Dragon 1	FU-151 ionosphere / particles Ionosphere mission	France	CNES	320
1967 January 29	Dumont d'Urville	-	Dragon 1	FU-151 ionosphere / particles Ionosphere mission	France	CNES	340
1967 May 5	Sonmiani	-	Dragon 1	Shahpar-1 test	Pakistan	SUPARCO	423
1967 October 4	Andoya	-	Dragon 1	ESRO D34 / 1 Solar x-ray / aeronomy mission	Europe	ESRO	248
1967 October 7	Andoya	-	Dragon 1	ESRO D30 / 1 Solar x-ray / aeronomy mission	Europe	ESRO	233
1967 October 10	Andoya	-	Dragon 1	Failure	Europe	ESRO	1.00
1968 February 14	Biscarosse	-	Dragon 1	FU-172 Solar Helium Solar ultraviolet mission	France	CNES	440
1968 March 29	Sonmiani	-	Dragon 1	Shahpar-2 test	Pakistan	SUPARCO	420
1968 May 22	Salto di Quirra	-	Dragon 1	Failure	Europe	ESRO	225
1969 March 17	Kourou	Kourou ALFS	Dragon 1	FU-172 Solar EUV 1 Solar extreme ultraviolet mission	France	CNES	410
1969 September 20	Thumba	-	Dragon 1	ISRO 26.01 Ionosphere mission	India	ISRO	400
1970 May 6	Mar Chiquita	-	Dragon 1	Electron density Test / plasma / fields mission	France	CNES	430
1972 December 13	CELPA	-	Dragon 1	FU-206 Protons / electrons Ionosphere / geocorona mission	France	CNES	380
1968 March 15	Kerguelen	-	Dragon 2B	FU-171 VLF / Ions Ionosphere mission -	France	CNES	400
1968 March 27	Kerguelen	-	Dragon 2B	FU-171 VLF / Ions Ionosphere mission -	France	CNES	400
1968 April 1	Kerguelen	-	Dragon 2B	FU-171 VLF / Ions Ionosphere mission -	France	CNES	416
1968 November 3	Andoya	-	Dragon 2B	FU-182 Ions / Electric field Ionosphere mission -	France	CNES	414
1969 February 6	Biscarosse	-	Dragon 2B	FU-180 Mass spectrometer F1 Ionosphere mission -	France	CNES	430
1969 February 6	Biscarosse	-	Dragon 2B	FU-180 Mass spectrometer F2 Ionosphere mission -	France	CNES	405
1969 February 6	Biscarosse	-	Dragon 2B	FU-180 Mass spectrometer F3 Ionosphere mission -	France	CNES	430
1969 February 7	Biscarosse	-	Dragon 2B	FU-180 Mass spectrometer F4 Ionosphere mission -	France	CNES	413
1969 April 13	Andoya	-	Dragon 2B	FU-182 Ions / Electric field Ionosphere mission -	France	CNES	399
1969 April 17	Andoya	-	Dragon 2B	FU-190 E field / Barium release Ionosphere / barium release mission -	France	CNES	329
1972 April 28	Sonmiani	-	Dragon 2B	Shahpar-3 Test / ionosphere mission -	Pakistan	SUPARCO	400
1968 July 23	Biscarosse		Dragon 3	FU-188 Technology test	France	CNES	562
1969 April 26	Kourou	Kourou ALFS	Dragon 3	FU-188 Technology test	France	CNES	410
1969 May 27	Biscarosse		Dragon 3	Failure	France	CNES	100
1969 November 18	Biscarosse		Dragon 3	FU-192 Plasma Ionosphere mission	France	CNES	475
1970 October 6	Biscarosse		Dragon 3	EIDI-1 Ionosphere mission	France	CNES	480
1970 October 22	Biscarosse		Dragon 3	EIDI-2 Ionosphere mission	France	CNES	480
1973 February 17	Biscarosse		Dragon 3	FU-211 EIDI-3 Ionosphere mission	France	CNES	460

== See also ==
- Belier
- Centaure
- Dauphin
- Éridan
