= SISPRE =

Italian Society of Studies on Jet Propulsion

SISPRE Acronym for Italian Society of Studies on Jet Propulsion (Societa Italiana Sviluppo Propulsione a Reazione).

Incorporated by Fiat Group and Finmeccanica each holding 50% of the stock and renamed CESPRE, it worked mostly for ITAF in 1953–56 to build an air-to-air missile, the C-7. In 1960 CESPRE devised and built a solid-fuel rocket for meteorological purposes, the C-41, on a 14 million liras budget. C-41 was launched in 1961 reaching an altitude of 30,000 mt. That same year SISPRE was incorporated, together with the Italian BPD, in the Società Generale Missilistica.

== Sources ==
- Michelangelo De Maria, Lucia Orlando (2008). Italy in Space: In Search of a Strategy, 1957-1975. Editions Beauchesne, 2008. ISBN 978-2701015187.
