= Italian ship Stromboli =

Stromboli has been borne by at least four ships of the Italian Navy:

- Italian cruiser Stromboli, an Etna-class cruiser launched in 1886 and scrapped in 1911.
- Italian patrol boat Stromboli, previously the mercantile Bohemie purchased by Italy in 1916 and renamed. She was discarded in 1919.
- Italian ship Stromboli (A 5329), previously a mercantile purchased by Italy in 1948 and used as a transport ship. She was stricken in 1972.
- Italian ship Stromboli (A 5327), a Stromboli-class replenishment oiler launched in 1975.
