= Proson-M1 =

Argentine sounding rocket

- Function: meteorological sounding rocket
- Manufacturer: Argentine Institute of Science and Technology
- Country of origin: Argentina

Size
- Height: 3.261 m (10.70 ft)
- Diameter: 0.20 m (7.9 in)
- Mass: 51.8 kg (114 lb)
- Stages: 2

Capacity

Launch history
- Launch sites: CELPA Chamical
- Total launches: 4
- First flight: August 23, 1963
- Last flight: August 26, 1963

First stage
- Thrust: 1700 kg
- Burn time: 5 seconds
- Propellant: nitrocellulose + nitroglycerin

Second stage
- Thrust: 750 kg
- Burn time: 3.5 seconds
- Propellant: nitrocellulose + nitroglycerin

The Proson-M1 was a two-stage meteorological sounding rocket developed by the Argentine Institute of Science and Technology for CITEFA in the 1960s, first launched on August 23, 1963, from CELPA (El Chamical). The rocket was launched using a delayed ignition system, with an 18-second interval between the first and second stages. Smoke charges were often used instead of payloads to study flight paths using optical tracking tools.

== Details ==
The Proson-M1 was a dual-stage design built primarily from steel (API-N80) and reinforced with duralumin fins for aerodynamic stability. The fins had trapezoidal shapes, with the first-stage surfaces being conical and the second-stage surfaces flat and parallel.

The first stage measured 1678 mm in length, 200 mm in diameter, and weighted 38.5 kg. The second stage measured 1583 mm in length, 110 mm in diameter, and weighted 13.3 kg. Both were powered by a solid-propellant engine made of a double-base propellant consisting of nitrocellulose and nitroglycerin. Maximum thrust was 1700 kg for the first stage and 750 kg for the second stage, with burn times of 5 seconds and 3.5 seconds, respectively.

Proson-M1 could reach a maximum velocity of Mach 4 and was capable of carrying payloads of up to 5 kg to 50 km.

== Launches ==
The Proson-M1 had four launches in August 23 and 26, 1963, to study flight paths using optical tracking tools like cine-theodolites.
