= Angeloni =

Angeloni is an Italian surname. Notable people with the surname include:

- Adriano Angeloni (born 1983), Italian cyclist
- Alcide Angeloni (1926–2025), Italian politician
- Francesco Angeloni (1559–1652), Italian writer, antiquarian and historian
- Juan Angeloni (born 1978), Argentine sport shooter
- Luana Angeloni (born 1952), Italian teacher and politician
- Luciano Angeloni (1917–1996), Italian prelate of the Catholic Church
- Michela Angeloni (born 1984), Italian ice hockey player
