= Bélier (rocket) =

French sounding rocket

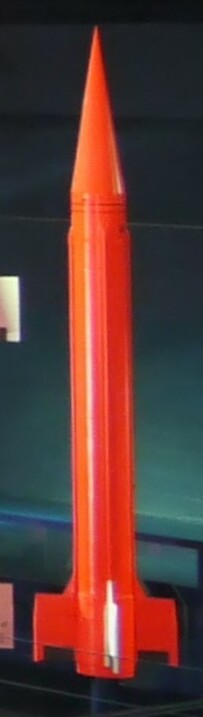
Belier at Musée de l'air et de l'espace

Belier rocket

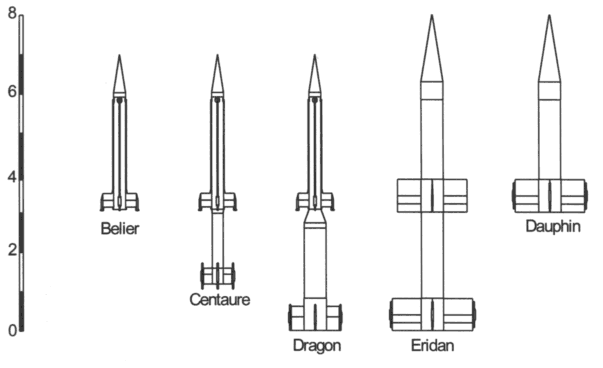
Sud-Aviation Belier rockets evolution

Bélier is the designation of a French sounding rocket family. Three versions of the Bélier were launched between 1961 and 1970 at the CIEES launch facility at Hammaguir, the Salto di Quirra and Ile du Levant missile ranges, and Kourou Space Center.

After its retirement, the Bélier was used as a stage for a family of solid-propellant rockets, including the Centaure, the Dragon, the Dauphin and the Éridan.

== Versions ==
=== Belier I ===
The first Belier single stage rocket, powered by a Jericho motor.

- payload: 30 kg
- apogee: 80 km
- takeoff thrust: 20.00 kN
- takeoff weight: 313 kg
- diameter: 0.31 m
- length: 4.01 m
- fin span: 0.78 m

=== Belier II ===
Upgraded Belier single stage rocket, using 'Plastolite' propellant.

- payload: 30 kg
- apogee: 130 km
- takeoff thrust: 21.50 kN
- takeoff weight: 352 kg
- diameter: 0.31 m
- length: 5.90 m
- fin span: 0.78 m

=== Belier III ===
Upgraded Belier single stage rocket, powered by a Vega motor using 'Isolane' propellant.

- apogee: 109 km
- takeoff weight: 400 kg
- diameter: 0.31 m
- length: 3.80 m

Belier III launches:

Date	Launch site	Nation	Agency	Apogee (km)	Mission
1968 March 18	Biscarrose	France	CNES	0	Failure
1968 May 14	Salto di Quirra	Europe	CNES, ESRO	130	Test mission
1969 March 6	Kourou Space Center	France	CNES	100	Test mission
1969 September 25	Biscarrose	France	ONERA	60	CRAPEL/ELECTRE re-entry vehicle test flight

== See also ==
- Centaure
- Dauphin
- Dragon
- Éridan
