= USS Wassuc (1865) =

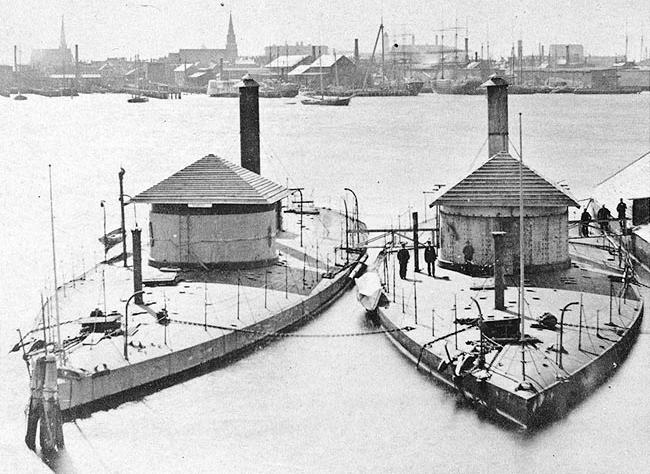
- Shawnee and Wassuc laid up at the Boston Navy Yard, circa 1871-72

History

United States
- Name: USS Wassuc
- Ordered: April 1863
- Builder: George W. Lawrence & Co., Portland, Maine
- Laid down: June 1863
- Launched: 25 July 1865
- Completed: 28 October 1865
- Commissioned: Never commissioned
- Fate: Sold for scrap, 9 September 1875

General characteristics
- Class & type: Casco-class monitor
- Displacement: 1,175 long tons (1,194 t)
- Length: 225 ft (69 m)
- Beam: 45 ft (14 m)
- Draft: 9 ft (2.7 m)
- Propulsion: Screw steamer
- Speed: 9 knots (10 mph; 17 km/h)
- Complement: 69 officers and enlisted
- Armament: 2 × 11 in (280 mm) smoothbore Dahlgren guns; 1 × 150-pounder Parrott rifle
- Armor: Turret: 8 in (200 mm); Pilothouse: 10 in (250 mm); Hull: 3 in (76 mm); Deck: 3 in (76 mm)

USS Wassuc — a single-turreted, twin-screw monitor — was built by the George W. Lawrence & Co., Portland, ME, and launched 25 July 1865, and completed 28 October 1865.

Wassuc was a Casco-class, light-draft monitor intended for service in the shallow bays, rivers, and inlets of the Confederacy. These warships sacrificed armor plate for a shallow draft and were fitted with a ballast compartment designed to lower them in the water during battle.

== Design revisions ==
Though the original designs for the Casco-class monitors were drawn by John Ericsson, the final revision was created by Chief Engineer Alban C. Stimers following Rear Admiral Samuel F. Du Pont's failed bombardment of Fort Sumter in 1863. By the time that the plans were put before the Monitor Board in New York City, Ericsson and Simers had a poor relationship, and Chief of the Bureau of Construction and Repair John Lenthall had little connection to the board. This resulted in the plans being approved and 20 vessels ordered without serious scrutiny of the new design. $14 million US was allocated for the construction of these vessels. It was discovered that Stimers had failed to compensate for the armor his revisions added to the original plan and this resulted in excessive stress on the wooden hull frames and a freeboard of only 3 inches. Stimers was removed from the control of the project and Ericsson was called in to undo the damage. He was forced to raise the hulls of the monitors under construction by 22 inches to make them seaworthy.

== Fate ==
Therefore, the Navy Department ordered on 24 June 1864 that Wassuc's deck be raised to provide sufficient freeboard. Upon delivery, the monitor was laid up at the Boston Navy Yard; and she saw no commissioned service. She was renamed Stromboli on 15 June 1869, but resumed the name Wassuc on 10 August 1869. Wassuc was sold for scrapping on 9 September 1875.
