= ONERA =

French national aerospace research centre

Coordinates: 48.712132°N 2.231852°E

Office National d'Études et de Recherches Aérospatiales (ONERA)

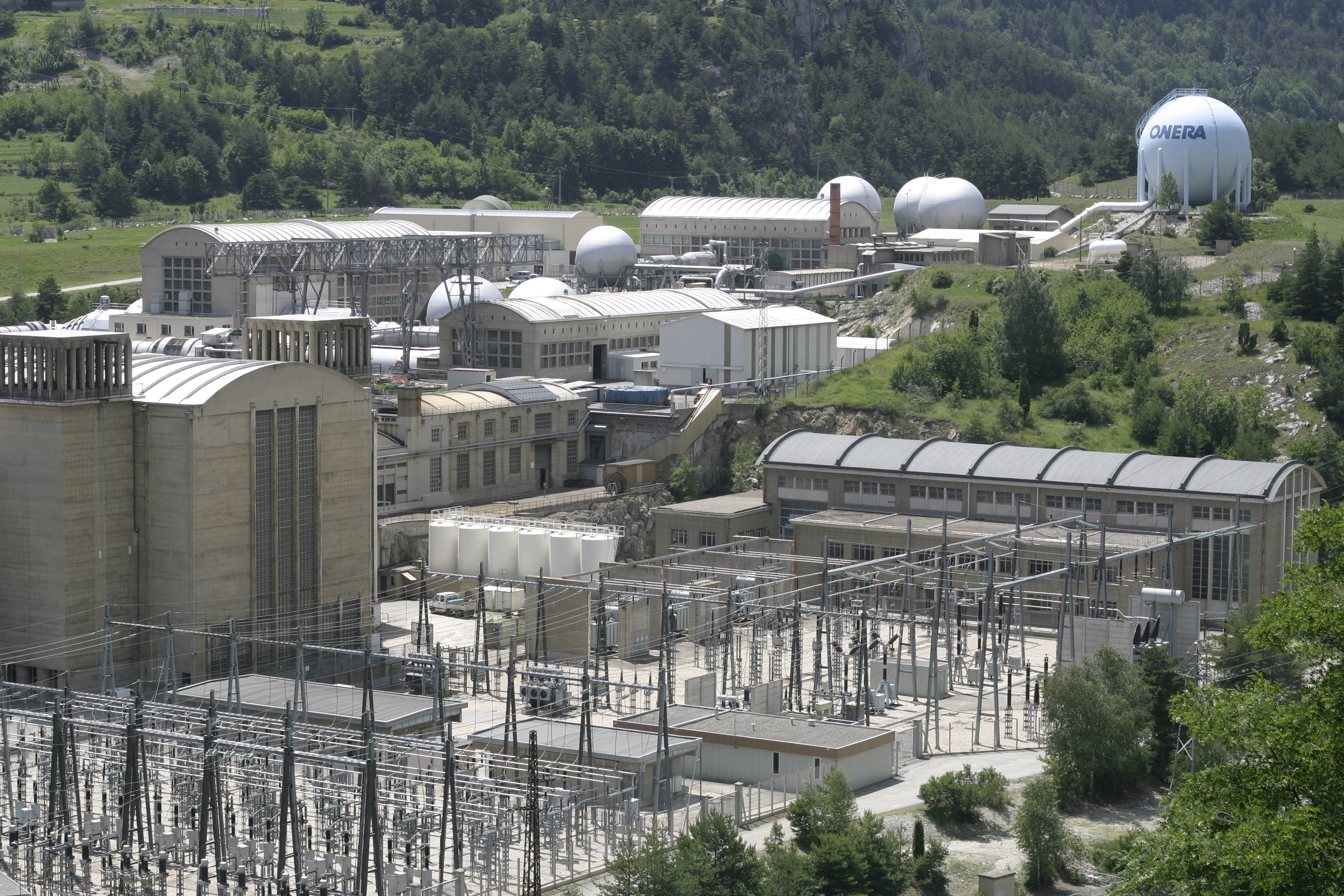
- An ONERA site at Modane–Avrieux
- Established: 1946; 80 years ago
- Research type: Applied
- Field of research: Aerospace; Defense
- Location: Palaiseau, France
- Operating agency: Minister of the Armed Forces
- Website: onera.fr

The Office National d'Études et de Recherches Aérospatiales (English: National Office for Aerospace Studies and Research) or ONERA, dubbed The French Aerospace Lab in English, is the French national aerospace research center. Originally founded as the Office National d'Études et de Recherches Aéronautiques (National Office for Aeronautical Studies and Research) in 1946, it was relabeled in 1963.

It is France's leading research center in aerospace and defense. It covers all disciplines and technologies in the field. Numerous high-profile French and European aerospace programs have passed through the ONERA since its creation including the Ariane family of launch vehicles, the Concorde supersonic airliner, the Dassault Mirage family of fighter aircraft and the Rafale, the Dassault Falcon family of business jets, Aérospatiale and later Airbus projects, missiles, engines, radars and many more.

Under the supervision of the Ministry of the Armed Forces, it is a public industrial and commercial establishment employing around 2,000 people, the majority of whom are researchers, engineers and technicians, with half its budget coming from government subsidies. The ONERA has extensive testing and computing resources, including the largest wind tunnel fleet in Europe. The ONERA's chairman is appointed by the Council of Ministers on the recommendation of the Minister of the Armed Forces.

== History ==
ONERA's historic roots are in the Paris suburb of Meudon, south of Paris. As early as 1877, the Chalais-Meudon site hosted an aeronautical research center for military aerostats (balloons): Etablissement central de l’aérostation militaire.

ONERA was created in May 1946 to relaunch aeronautics research, an activity that had gone into hibernation during the Second World War and the German occupation. Its creation reflected the government's decision to recover the large wind tunnel in Ötztal, Austria, in the French administrative zone, and move it to France. Today, ONERA's extensive array of wind tunnels is one of its main assets. ONERA operates a world-class fleet of wind tunnels, the largest in Europe. The S1MA wind tunnel at Modane-Avrieux, developing 88 MW of total power, is Europe's largest transonic wind tunnel (tests at Mach 0.05 to Mach 1).

== Organization ==
The Chairman and CEO of ONERA is appointed by the French Council of Ministers, acting on a proposal by the Minister of Defense. Since June 2014, the Chairman and CEO is Bruno Sainjon.

=== Sites of ONERA facilities ===
ONERA is organized in eight geographic areas. It has about 2,000 employees, with 1,500 engineers and scientists (including 230 doctoral candidates), as well as support staff.

Three centers in the greater Paris area (Ile-de-France):

- ONERA Palaiseau, current headquarters
- ONERA Châtillon
- ONERA Meudon

Two centers in the Midi-Pyrenees region of southwest France:

- ONERA Toulouse, near the leading aeronautical engineering schools ISAE-Sup’Aéro and ENAC
- ONERA Fauga–Mauzac (wind tunnels), south of Toulouse.

Three other centers:

- ONERA Lille, northern France (formerly the Lille Fluid Mechanics Institute)
- ONERA Salon de Provence, southern France, on the site of the Ecole de l’air flying school
- ONERA Modane-Avrieux (wind tunnels), in the Savoy region of southeast France.

=== Scientific departments ===
ONERA is organized in four scientific branches: Fluid Mechanics and Energetics; Materials and Structures; Physics; and Information Processing and Systems. Wind tunnel testing is managed in the GMT (Grands Moyens Techniques) department. Aerospace prospective depends on a specific department.

The Direction Technique et des Programmes (DTP) comprises the following departments:

- DAAA - Aérodynamique, aéroélasticité, acoustique.
- DEMR - Électromagnétisme et radar.
- DMAS - Matériaux et structures.
- DMPE - Multi-physique pour l'énergétique.
- DOTA - Optique et techniques associées.
- DPHY - Physique, instrumentation, environnement, espace.
- DTIS - Traitement de l'information et systèmes.

== Missions ==
Unlike NASA in the United States, ONERA is not an agency for space science and exploration. However, it carries out a wide range of research for space agencies, both CNES in France and the European Space Agency (ESA), as well as for the French defense agency, DGA (Direction générale de l’armement). ONERA also independently conducts its own long-term research to anticipate future technology needs. It focuses on scientific research, for example in aerodynamics for concrete applications on aircraft, the design of launchers and new defense technologies, such as drones or unmanned aerial systems (UAS).

ONERA also uses its research and innovation capabilities to support both French and European industry. ONERA has contributed to a number of landmark aerospace and defense programs in recent decades, including Airbus, Ariane, Rafale, Falcon, Mirage and Concorde.

=== Rockets ===
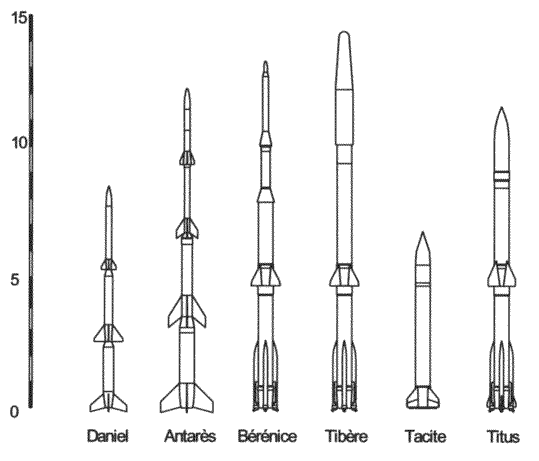
The Onera sounding rocket family

Various rockets have been developed through ONERA, some of which are listed below:

- Daniel
- Antarès
- Bérénice
- Tibère
- Tacite
- Titus
- LEX

== Commercial partnerships ==
ONERA's customer-partners include Airbus, Safran (Snecma, Turbomeca, Sagem), Dassault Aviation, Thales and other major industry players. Innovative small businesses are also encouraged to call on the expertise of ONERA's scientists and engineers, and to take advantage of technology transfer opportunities. The company Tefal was created by two ONERA engineers, the inventors of the “non-stick pan”. These products were produced and sold by Tefal S.A., which was subsequently acquired by Groupe SEB.

== See also ==
- French space program
- CNES
- Aerospace Valley
