= Éridan (rocket) =

French rocket

- Country of origin: France
- First flight: 26 September 1968
- Last flight: 14 November 1979
- Application: high altitude research

sounding rocket

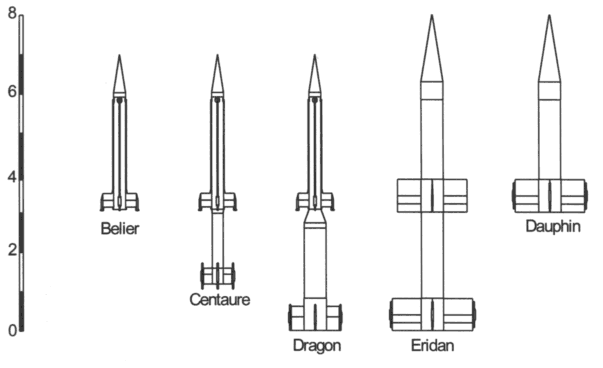
Sud-Aviation Belier rocket family.

The Éridan is a two-stage French sounding rocket, which results from the use of the Stromboli engine (also used on the Dragon and Dauphin) for the first and second stages.

It belonged to a family of solid-propellant rockets that also encompasses the Belier, the Centaure, the Dragon, and the Dauphin. As the most powerful version of this series it could lift payloads from 120 kilograms (260 lb) to 250 kilograms (550 lb) up to altitudes of 220 kilometres (720,000 ft) to a maximum of 425 kilometres (1,394,000 ft).

Its ascent time is between 230 and 350 seconds. Total thrust was 90.00 kN (20,232 lbf) with a gross mass of 2,006 kilograms (4,422 lb) to 2,316 kilograms (5,106 lb) depending in payload. The rocket had a height of 9.92 metres (32.5 ft), a diameter of 0.56 metres (1.8 ft) and a span of 1.773 metres (5.82 ft).

An improved version called Éridan II was planned in 1971 but it never materialized due to the project being cancelled in 1973.

== Launches ==
Éridan was flown fifteen times between 1968 and 1979 from Kourou and the Kerguelen Islands.

The first flight from Kourou on 26 September 1968 failed, but was followed by twelve successful launches that took the rocket to altitudes of 196 to 420 km between 12 April 1969 and 14 November 1979. Objectives were ultraviolet astronomy experiments, solar physics and training launches for operators at the Kourou launch base.

Two Éridan were launched in January and February 1975 off the Kerguelen Islands for magnetosphere studies.

Date	Launch site	Launch Complex	Mission Description	Apogee (km)
1968 September 26	Kourou	Kourou ALFS	Failure	0
1969 April 12	Kourou	Kourou ALFS	FU-181B test flight test	406
1969 April 23	Kourou	Kourou ALFS	FU-187 test, A cone test	420
1969 August 22	Kourou	Kourou ALFS	FU-187 test, B cone test	242
1971 May 17	Kourou	Kourou ALFS	FU-203 recovery test	196
1971 October 16	Kourou	Kourou ALFS	ATLAS / CM16 / Gemini Ultraviolet astronomy mission	205
1972 November 11	Kourou	Kourou ALFS	FU-201 LPSP-EUV2	300
1972 December 7	Kourou	Kourou ALFS	FU-205 JANUS Ultraviolet astronomy mission	213
1973 November 11	Kourou	Kourou ALFS	FU-201 (Solar EUV 2) Solar extreme ultraviolet mission	300
1974 November 5	Kourou	Kourou ALFS	FAUST FU-214 Ultraviolet astronomy mission	220
1974 November 19	Kourou	Kourou ALFS	FAUST FU-215 Ultraviolet astronomy mission	220
1975 January 26	Kerguelen	-	ARAKS Northward Ionosphere / plasma mission	190
1975 February 15	Kerguelen	-	ARAKS Eastward Ionosphere / plasma mission	185
1978 November 23	Kourou	Kourou ALFS	Ariane range test	350
1979 June 13	Kourou	Kourou ALFS	Ariane range test	350
1979 November 14	Kourou	Kourou ALFS	Ariane range test	350

== See also ==
- Belier
- Centaure
- Dauphin
- Dragon
