= Salto di Quirra =

Restricted weapons testing range and rocket launch site on Sardinia

Poligono sperimentale e di addestramento interforze Salto di Quirra
- Near Perdasdefogu, Sardinia in Italy

Site information
- Type: Aerospace (military/civil)
- Operator: Italian Air Force
- Status: Active

Location
- Location in Italy
- Coordinates: 39°31′38″N 9°37′58″E

Site history
- In use: 1956–present

Test information
- Other tests: Missiles, aircraft weapons, drone aircraft, rockets

Salto di Quirra is a restricted weapons testing range and rocket launch site near Perdasdefogu on the island of Sardinia. It is the largest military range in Italy, composed of 12,000 hectares of land owned by the Italian Ministry of Defence and one of the largest in operation within the European Union. Birth defects and cancer in the area have been blamed on weaponry used at the site.

Sardinia hosts about 60% of Italian military ranges and together with Friuli-Venezia Giulia is one of the most militarized regions of Italy.

Salto di Quirra primarily launches military rockets, but civilian rockets, such as the Skylark, have occasionally been launched for the study of the upper atmosphere.

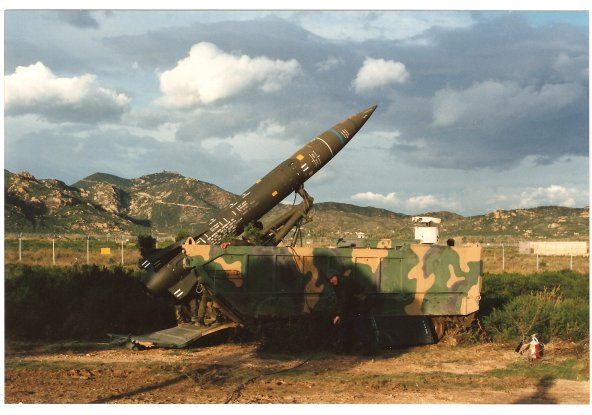
MGM-52 Lance launch from Salto di Quirra in 1990

The Salto di Quirra range is located close to the town of Perdasdefogu in a mountainous zone at the southeast of Sardinia. It is an inter-arm range, currently placed under the authority of the Italian Air Force. Its main activity deals with the tests of various types of missiles used or built by Italy, or in collaboration.

At the beginning of the 1960s, this base was used for the first sounding rocket launches carried out by the CRA (Centro Ricerche Aerospaziali) in cooperation with the Italian Air Force and NASA. Three campaigns of Nike-Asp and Nike-Cajun launches took place in 1961 and 1963.

From 1964 and until 1972, it was used for the ESRO's sounding rocket program using especially Skylark and Centaure rockets, but also Bélier and Zenit-C. During this period, some sounding rockets were also launched on behalf of Switzerland and Germany.

After 1972, the Salto di Quirra activities in the field of rocketry were limited to national programs. Three Alfa experimental vehicles were launched successfully in 1973-75. A test of the San Marco scout rocket, in 1992, was less successful.

== Vega test firings ==
=== Zefiro 9 ===
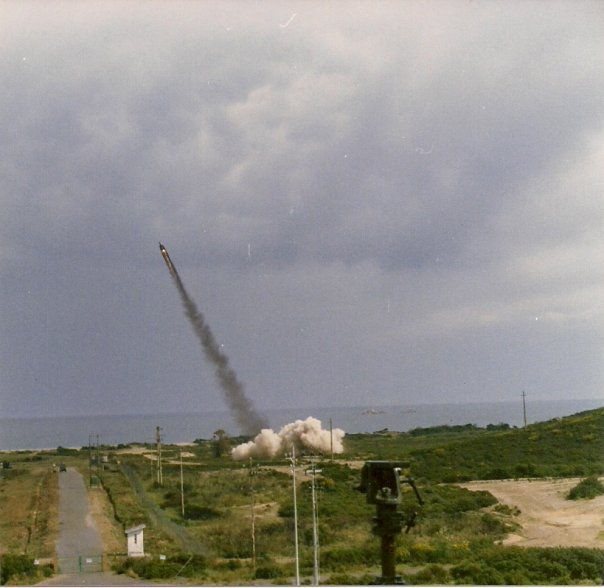
MGM-52 Lance launch from Salto di Quirra in 1988

Two test firings of the Zefiro 9 rocket engine, designed to power the third stage of the Vega launch vehicle, have been conducted at Salto di Quirra. The first test firing took place 20 December 2005 and was a complete success. The second firing, on 28 March 2007, experienced unexpected anomalous behavior.

== Space and missiles operations ==
From its very first start, the Salto di Quirra (Sardinia) firing range played a relevant role in Italian space operations. The range belonged to the ITAF Ammunition Research Unit, since 1956 headed by Luigi Broglio whose name had been put forward by Gen. Mario Pezzi. In 1959, the Italian National Research Council (CNR) and ITAF started a research program in the outer atmosphere using rocket-carried probes. In 1961, together with NASA, CNR planned a series of weather experiments releasing clouds of lithium-sodium carried in the atmosphere by USA-built Nike-Cajun missiles launched from the Wallops Island Base (Va) and Salto di Quirra (Italy) range. High altitude atmospheric streams could be measured quite accurately observing contemporarily the litho-sodium clouds from seven ground-stations in Italy (five in Sardinia and one each at Furbara base and Borgo Piave observation post).

The first launch of the series took place on January 12, 1961. A two-stage Nike-Cajun missile released 20 kg of sodium and lithium dust at an altitude of 90 km (270 000 ft). Six launches altogether were accomplished successfully. Broglio and his team set even a record, a triple launch within 24 hours, starting on the morning of January 19 and ending up the evening of the day after. Thanks to media reporting, the world at large was informed of Italian space research activities and that it was operating a missile launching pad. After this exploit, the Salto di Quirra base was involved in many research programs particularly in the European Space Research Organization (ESRO) framework.

In 1962 ESRO planned a series of eight launches to study the outer atmosphere and the ionosphere. These experiments were to be fundamental to build the European Space Agency in the following years: British-built Skylark and French-built Centaure missiles were used for the tests. The high level of both personnel and facilities at Salto di Quirra made it the favourite launching base of ESRO until 1972, following an agreement signed in Paris in 1967 by ESRO's CEO, Pierre Auger.

In 1985 the Avio Company built a vertical structure in Salto di Quirra to test the engines of the European vectors Ariane 3 and Ariane 4 and the Zefiro vector, from its prototype Zefiro 16 to Zefiro 9 down to number 23 in the series. At Salto di Quirra the second and third stages of Vega were tested thoroughly, the Vega being a new European vector developed and built mostly by Italian firms.

A new Space Propulsion Test Facility for liquid-propellant rocket engines (LRE) was announced around the beginning of 2020 by Avio and inaugurated on 5 October 2021. The test stand is intended for tests for the development and qualification of rocket engines powered by cryogenic propellants and complements the engineering activities already carried out at the Villaputzu facility. The test stand is financed by Avio in collaboration with the Ministry of Economic Development and the Sardinia Region for a total cost of 33 million euros. In the first three years of activity, 21 people are expected to be employed, which, at full capacity, will reach 35 highly qualified and specialized staff including engineers, chemists, computer scientists and technicians.

Currently, for this type of testing on liquid-propellant engines, Avio is forced to rely on other foreign research centres, as happened for example in the case of the test on the Mira-D engine turbopump. Since Avio's activity has so far been concentrated on the production of solid-propellant engines and, in the case of liquid-propellant engines, limited to components, such as turbopumps, for external companies, the current situation has never created particular needs that would justify the construction of a dedicated test stand directly accessible to the company; however, with the start of the Vega-E development phase, which includes the use of the M10 liquid-propellant stage, the possibility of using a dedicated company test stand will allow for a more flexible, faster and easier design and testing phase. Also to speed up the development of future engines based, like the M10, on composite structures, a plant for the manufacture of carbon-carbon components will be built near the centre.

== Birth defects and cancer ==
Local citizens have coined the term 'Quirra syndrome' for an increase in deformities and cancer in the area. In one town, a quarter of children born in a single year in the late 1980s had birth defects. Researchers discovered that almost two-thirds of local shepherds had cancer, which has been blamed on thorium dust and depleted uranium. Former commanders of the site have since been made to appear before the Italian courts.

== See also ==
- Space Propulsion Test Facility in Perdasdefogu
