= Centaure (rocket) =

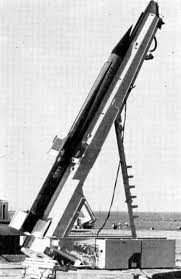
- Centaur rocket
- Country of origin: France
- Application: high altitude research

sounding rocket

Centaure was a two-stage French sounding rocket consisting of a Venus first stage and a Belier second stage. It belongs to a family of solid-propellant rockets consisting of the Belier, Centaure, Dragon, Dauphin, and Eridan.

The aerospace company Sud Aviation was appointed as the prime contractor for the project that would create Centaure in 1958; the first launch took place three years later. Centaure rockets were launched from a variety of sites, including the CIEES/Hammaguir missile range, Reggane, CELPA, Salto di Quirra, Esrange, Thumba, Sonmiani, and Andøya. It had a maximum payload of 60 kg, an apogee of 130-146 km, a launch thrust of 44 kN, a launch weight of 500-600 kg, a diameter of 0.28 m and a length of 5.9-6.3 m.

== Development ==
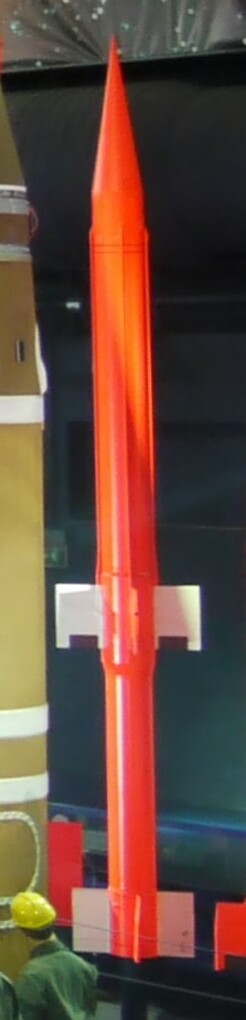
Centaure in the Hall of the Space in the Museum of Air and Space Paris, Le Bourget, France, February 2009

In the immediate aftermath of the Second World War, various nations were keen to incorporate recent military advances into their own armed forces; the newly liberated nation of France was no exception. Akin to the American's Operation Paperclip, France recruited various scientists and skilled personnel from the former Axis countries, particularly those with knowledge of advanced aerospace technologies. Amongst these were in excess of 30 staff that had formerly worked at Peenemünde, the hub of the Nazi German rocket programme that produced the V-2 rocket - the technology for which was partly used for the first launchers of the space age. During mid-1946, France embarked on development of a V-2 derivative, commonly referred to as the Super V-2. However, France's wider rocketry research programme was intended to develop the nation's knowledge of rocketry for both military and scientific purposes.

Additional projects to develop France's first sounding rockets were launched during the late 1940s and 1950s. One of the largest, called Veronique, was started in 1949; it would see the launch of nearly one hundred rockets between 1950 and 1975, the findings from which were used to improve various aspects of French rockets, including their structure and fuel composition. During 1958, the French aerospace company Sud Aviation was appointed to lead a new rocket programme intended to produce a new generation of high-performance and simplified solid-fuel sounding rockets. Accordingly, an initial series, referred to Aries, Centaure and Dragon, was developed during the latter half of the 1960s, along with the Dauphin and Eridanus rockets, which were capable of carrying larger payloads.

Launches of the Centaure rocket were performed between 1961 and 1986. Data collected from the operation of the Centaure rocket would benefit not only France but also feed into the European Space Research Organisation (ESRO). Between October 1962 and April 1969, the Centaure was the most commonly used sounding rocket by the ESRO. The first launch at Sweden's Esrange space complex, conducted on 19 November 1966, was performed using a Centaure rocket. There was also international interest (outside of Europe) in the Centaure; during the mid-1960s, India signed an agreement with France for the domestic production of 50 Centaure rockets, which would be used for scientific purposes. Ultimately, the Centaure was the basis for India's Rohini rocket family.

During 1976, the French government, have recently reoriented its space policy, discontinued the national sounding rocket programme.

Nine scale models representing multiple rockets, including the Centaure, were built for the Musée des Arts et Métiers and displayed at the temporary exhibition L'Espace held in 1964. These models have been preserved and periodically are displayed.

== Versions ==
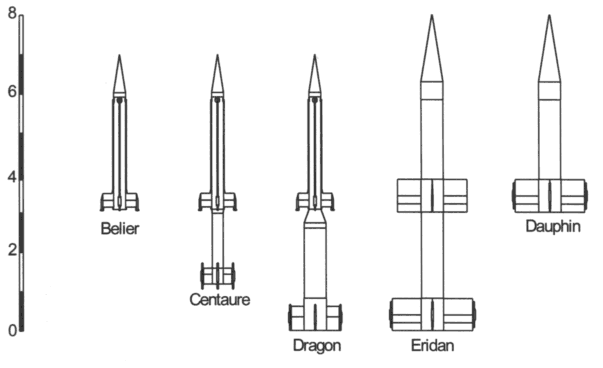
Sud-Aviation Belier rockets evolution

There were multiple versions of Centaure rocket produced:

Version	Stages	Gross mass (kg)	Height (m)	Diameter (m)	Apogee (km)
Centaure	Venus + Belier	457	6.02	0.28	140
Centaure 1	Venus + Belier	600	5.9	0.28	130
Centaure 2A	Venus + Belier II	600	5.9	0.28	146
Centaure 2B	Venus + Belier II	500	6.3	0.28	146
Centaure 2C	Venus + Belier II	600	5.9	0.28	146

== Launches ==
A large number of Centaure rockets was launched between 1961 and 1986:

Date	Launch site	Launch Complex	Launch Vehicle	Mission Description	Nation	Agency	Apogee (km)
1961 May 27	Hammaguira	Hammaguira Bacchus	Centaure	Test mission	France	CNES	130
1961 May 29	Hammaguira	Hammaguira Bacchus	Centaure	Test mission	France	CNES	130
1961 December 6	Reggane		Centaure	Aeronomy mission	France	CNES	130
1961 December 6	Hammaguira	Hammaguira Bacchus	Centaure	Aeronomy mission	France	CNES	130
1961 December 9	Hammaguira	Hammaguira Bacchus	Centaure	Aeronomy mission	France	CNES	130
1961 December 9	Reggane		Centaure	Aeronomy mission	France	CNES	130
1961 December 9	Hammaguira	Hammaguira Bacchus	Centaure	Aeronomy mission	France	CNES	130
1962 May 18	Ile du Levant	CERES	Centaure	Test mission	France	CNES	130
1962 May 29	Hammaguira	Hammaguira Bacchus	Centaure	Aeronomy mission	France	CNES	130
1962 May 29	Reggane		Centaure	Aeronomy mission	France	CNES	130
1962 May 29	Ile du Levant	CERES	Centaure	Aeronomy mission	France	CNES	130
1962 June 5	Hammaguira	Hammaguira Bacchus	Centaure	Aeronomy mission	France	CNES	130
1962 June 5	Hammaguira	Hammaguira Bacchus	Centaure	Aeronomy mission	France	CNES	130
1962 June 5	Ile du Levant	CERES	Centaure	Aeronomy mission	France	CNES	130
1962 June 5	Reggane		Centaure	Aeronomy mission	France	CNES	130
1962 June 5	Reggane		Centaure	Aeronomy mission	France	CNES	130
1962 November 26	Hammaguira	Hammaguira Bacchus	Centaure	Aeronomy mission	France	CNES	130
1962 November 27	CELPA		Centaure	Aeronomy mission	France	CNES	130
1962 November 28	Hammaguira	Hammaguira Bacchus	Centaure	Aeronomy mission	France	CNES	130
1962 November 30	CELPA		Centaure	Aeronomy mission	France	CNES	130
1962 November 30	Ile du Levant	CERES	Centaure	Aeronomy mission	France	CNES	130
1962 November 30	Hammaguira	Hammaguira Bacchus	Centaure	Aeronomy mission	France	CNES	130
1962 November 30	Hammaguira	Hammaguira Bacchus	Centaure	Aeronomy mission	France	CNES	130
1962 December 1	Hammaguira	Hammaguira Bacchus	Centaure	FAILURE: Failure	France	CNES	0
1962 December 4	Hammaguira		Centaure	Aeronomy mission	France	CNES	130
1962 December 8	CELPA		Centaure	Aeronomy mission	France	CNES	130
1962 December 9	CELPA		Centaure	Aeronomy mission	France	CNES	130
1962 December 12	Ile du Levant	CERES	Centaure	Aeronomy mission	France	CNES	130
1962 December 12	Ile du Levant	CERES	Centaure	Aeronomy mission	France	CNES	130
1963 April 1	Kerguelen		Centaure	Ionosphere mission	France	CNES	130
1963 May 14	Hammaguira	Hammaguira Bacchus	Centaure	Aeronomy mission	France	CNES	150
1963 May 15			Centaure	MPE Ba-3 Aeronomy mission	France	CNES	155
1963 May 21	Reggane		Centaure	Aeronomy mission	France	CNES	150
1963 May 21	Ile du Levant	CERES	Centaure	Aeronomy mission	France	CNES	150
1963 May 21	Hammaguira	Hammaguira Bacchus	Centaure	MPE Ba-4 Aeronomy mission	France	CNES	125
1963 May 24	Hammaguira	Hammaguira Bacchus	Centaure	Aeronomy mission	France	CNES	150
1963 May 25	CELPA		Centaure	Sodium cloud Aeronomy mission	France	CNES	189
1963 May 30	CELPA		Centaure	Aeronomy mission	France	CNES	150
1963 May 30	CELPA		Centaure	Aeronomy mission	France	CNES	150
1981 February 4	Thumba		Centaure	Langmuir / E Field Ionosphere mission	France	ISRO	150
1982 January 30	Thumba		Centaure	Langmuir / E Field Ionosphere mission	France	ISRO	150
1986 March 7	Thumba		Centaure	D-region ionization comparison Aeronomy mission	France	ISRO	140
1963 June 12	Hammaguira	Hammaguira Bacchus	Centaure 1	Aeronomy mission	France	CNES	150
1963 June 13	Hammaguira	Hammaguira Bacchus	Centaure 1	Aeronomy mission	France	CNES	150
1963 June 14	Hammaguira	Hammaguira Bacchus	Centaure 1	Aeronomy mission	France	CNES	150
1964 February 9	Hammaguira	Hammaguira Bacchus	Centaure 1	Aeronomy mission	France	CNES	170
1964 February 12	Hammaguira	Hammaguira Bacchus	Centaure 1	Aeronomy mission	France	CNES	150
1964 February 12	Hammaguira	Hammaguira Bacchus	Centaure 1	Aeronomy mission	France	CNES	150
1964 February 12	Hammaguira	Hammaguira Bacchus	Centaure 1	Aeronomy mission	France	CNES	150
1964 February 13	Hammaguira	Hammaguira Bacchus	Centaure 1	Aeronomy mission	France	CNES	190
1964 February 13	Hammaguira	Hammaguira Bacchus	Centaure 1	Aeronomy mission	France	CNES	150
1964 February 14	Hammaguira	Hammaguira Bacchus	Centaure 1	MPE Ba-5 Aeronomy mission	France	CNES	190
1964 February 15	Hammaguira	Hammaguira Bacchus	Centaure 1	MPE Ba-6 Aeronomy mission	France	CNES	150
1964 April 11	Hammaguira	Hammaguira Bacchus	Centaure 1	Sodium / TMA release Aeronomy mission	France	CNES	151
1964 April 13	Hammaguira	Hammaguira Bacchus	Centaure 1	Sodium / TMA release Aeronomy mission	France	CNES	151
1964 May 4	Hammaguira	Hammaguira Bacchus	Centaure 1	CNET A test	France	CNES	151
1964 May 8	Hammaguira	Hammaguira Bacchus	Centaure 1	CNET A test	France	CNES	151
1964 May 10	Hammaguira	Hammaguira Bacchus	Centaure 1	Seddon Aeronomy mission	France	CNES	151
1964 May 10	Hammaguira	Hammaguira Bacchus	Centaure 1	Sodium release Aeronomy mission	France	CNES	151
1964 May 14	Hammaguira	Hammaguira Bacchus	Centaure 1	Seddon Aeronomy mission	France	CNES	151
1964 October 5	Hammaguira	Hammaguira Bacchus	Centaure 1	CNET B test	France	CNES	150
1964 October 7	Hammaguira	Hammaguira Bacchus	Centaure 1	CNET B test	France	CNES	150
1964 October 29	Ile du Levant	CERES	Centaure 1	ESRO C02 / 1 Aeronomy mission	Europe	ESRO	150
1964 November 4	CELPA		Centaure 1	Aeronomy mission	France	CONAE	175
1964 November 5	Hammaguira	Hammaguira Bacchus	Centaure 1	Sodium release Aeronomy mission	France	CNES	150
1964 November 5	Hammaguira	Hammaguira Bacchus	Centaure 1	TMA Aeronomy mission	France	CNES	150
1964 November 5	Reggane		Centaure 1	Sodium release Aeronomy mission	France	CNES	150
1964 November 5	Ile du Levant	CERES	Centaure 1	TMA Aeronomy mission	France	CNES	150
1964 November 5	Reggane		Centaure 1	Sodium release Aeronomy mission	France	CNES	150
1964 November 5	CELPA		Centaure 1	Aeronomy mission	France	CONAE	176
1964 November 6	Ile du Levant	CERES	Centaure 1	TMA Aeronomy mission	France	CNES	150
1964 November 6	Reggane		Centaure 1	Sodium / TMA release Aeronomy mission	France	CNES	150
1964 November 6	CELPA		Centaure 1	Aeronomy mission	France	CONAE	179
1964 November 27	Hammaguira	Hammaguira Bacchus	Centaure 1	MPE Ba-9 Aeronomy mission	France	CNES	166
1964 November 30	Hammaguira	Hammaguira Bacchus	Centaure 1	MPE Ba-10 Aeronomy mission	France	CNES	207
1965 March 4	Hammaguira	Hammaguira Bacchus	Centaure 1	SINTRA pointing Solar mission	France	CNES	120
1965 April 28	Thumba		Centaure 1	ISRO 15.02 Aeronomy / ionosphere mission	India	ISRO	150
1965 May 1	Thumba		Centaure 1	ISRO 15.01 Ionosphere mission	India	ISRO	140
1965 June 22	Hammaguira	Hammaguira Bacchus	Centaure 1	Cs Aeronomy mission	France	CNES	150
1965 June 23	Hammaguira	Hammaguira Bacchus	Centaure 1	Sodium release Aeronomy mission	France	CNES	150
1965 June 23	Ile du Levant	CERES	Centaure 1	Sodium release Aeronomy mission	France	CNES	150
1965 June 23	Ile du Levant	CERES	Centaure 1	TMA Aeronomy mission	France	CNES	150
1965 June 23	Hammaguira	Hammaguira Bacchus	Centaure 1	TMA Aeronomy mission	France	CNES	150
1965 June 24	Ile du Levant	CERES	Centaure 1	TMA Aeronomy mission	France	CNES	150
1965 June 24	Ile du Levant	CERES	Centaure 1	Sodium release Aeronomy mission	France	CNES	150
1965 June 24	Reggane		Centaure 1	Aeronomy mission	France	CNES	150
1965 June 24	Hammaguira	Hammaguira Bacchus	Centaure 1	TMA Aeronomy mission	France	CNES	150
1965 November 18	Hammaguira	Hammaguira Bechar	Centaure 1	MPE Ba-14 Aeronomy mission	France	CNES	170
1965 November 19	Hammaguira	Hammaguira Bechar	Centaure 1	MPE Ba-15 Aeronomy mission	France	CNES	190
1965 November 25	CELPA		Centaure 1	Aeronomy mission	Argentina		175
1965 November 25	CELPA		Centaure 1	Aeronomy mission	Argentina		175
1965 November 26	CELPA		Centaure 1	Aeronomy mission	Argentina		175
1965 December 7	Salto di Quirra		Centaure 1	ESRO C07 / 1 Aeronomy mission	Europe	ESRO	150
1965 December 11	Salto di Quirra		Centaure 1	ESRO C07 / 2 Aeronomy mission	Europe	ESRO	159
1965 December 14	Salto di Quirra		Centaure 1	ESRO C06 / 1 Solar x-ray mission	Europe	ESRO	159
1965 December 16	Hammaguira	Hammaguira Bacchus	Centaure 1	Aeronomy mission	France	CNES	150
1965 December 16	Hammaguira	Hammaguira Bacchus	Centaure 1	Ionosphere mission	France	CNES	150
1965 December 16	Hammaguira	Hammaguira Bacchus	Centaure 1	Ionosphere mission	France	CNES	150
1965 December 20	Hammaguira	Hammaguira Bacchus	Centaure 1	Ionosphere mission	France	CNES	150
1966 January 8	Thumba		Centaure 1	ISRO 15.03 Aeronomy / ionosphere mission	India	ISRO	150
1966 January 17	Hammaguira	Hammaguira Bacchus	Centaure 1	Ionosphere mission	France	CNES	124
1966 February 4	Andoya		Centaure 1	ESRO C15 / 1 Aurora mission	Europe	ESRO	120
1966 February 22	Andoya		Centaure 1	FAILURE: Failure	Europe	ESRO	20
1966 February 23	Andoya		Centaure 1	ESRO C15 / 2 Aurora mission	Europe	ESRO	115
1966 March 3	Hammaguira	Hammaguira Bacchus	Centaure 1	Solar ultraviolet mission	France	CNES	125
1966 March 9	Andoya		Centaure 1	ESRO C13 / 1 Aurora mission	Europe	ESRO	94
1966 March 10	Andoya		Centaure 1	ESRO C13 / 2 Aurora mission	Europe	ESRO	114
1966 March 24	Thumba		Centaure 1	ISRO 15.04 Aeronomy mission	India	ISRO	163
1966 March 24	Thumba		Centaure 1	ISRO 15.05 Aeronomy mission	India	ISRO	159
1966 May 15	Nissaki-Karystos		Centaure 1	ESRO C06 / 2 Solar x-ray mission	Europe	ESRO	140
1966 May 20	Nissaki-Karystos		Centaure 1	ESRO C22 / 1 Solar ultraviolet mission	Europe	ESRO	118
1966 May 20	Koroni		Centaure 1	ESRO C22 / 2 Solar ultraviolet mission	Europe	ESRO	114
1966 June 13	Hammaguira	Hammaguira Bacchus	Centaure 1	Sodium release / Turbulence Aeronomy mission	France	CNES	180
1966 June 16	Hammaguira	Hammaguira Bacchus	Centaure 1	Sodium release / Turbulence Aeronomy mission	France	CNES	150
1966 October 8	Hammaguira	Hammaguira Bacchus	Centaure 1	FU-109 test	France	CNES	150
1966 November 14	Hammaguira	Hammaguira Bacchus	Centaure 1	FU-167 Aeronomy mission	France	CNES	150
1966 November 14	Hammaguira	Hammaguira Bacchus	Centaure 1	FU-167 Aeronomy mission	France	CNES	150
1966 November 19	Kiruna	Kiruna C	Centaure 1	ESRO C21 / 1 Aurora / chemical release mission	Europe	ESRO	123
1966 November 29	Kiruna	Kiruna C	Centaure 1	ESRO C9 / 2 Aurora mission	Europe	ESRO	149
1966 November 30	Kiruna	Kiruna C	Centaure 1	ESRO C9 / 1 Aurora mission	Europe	ESRO	147
1967 February 4	Kiruna	Kiruna C	Centaure 1	ESRO C21 / 2 Aurora / chemical release	Europe	ESRO	78
1967 February 16	Kiruna	Kiruna C	Centaure 1	ESRO C10 / 1 Ionosphere	Europe	ESRO	96
1967 February 22	Kiruna	Kiruna C	Centaure 1	ESRO C10 / 2 Ionosphere	Europe	ESRO	98
1967 March 28	Hammaguira	Hammaguira Bacchus	Centaure 1	CNES C145 Aeronomy	France	CNES	90
1967 April 19	Thumba	-	Centaure 1	ISRO 45.01 Ionosphere	India	ISRO	79
1967 May 3	Sonmiani	-	Centaure 1	Aeronomy	Pakistan	CNES, SUPARCO	90
1967 May 7	Sonmiani	-	Centaure 1	Aeronomy	Pakistan	CNES, SUPARCO	90
1967 September 6	CELPA	-	Centaure 1	Nation: Argentina	Argentina	CNIE	90
1967 September 7	CELPA	-	Centaure 1	Nation: Argentina	Argentina	CNIE	90
1967 November 7	CELPA	-	Centaure 1	Aeronomy mission	France	CNES	90
1967 November 26	Kiruna	Kiruna C	Centaure 1	ESRO C31 / 1 Ionosphere	Europe	ESRO	77
1967 December 6	Kiruna	Kiruna C	Centaure 1	ESRO C31 / 2 Ionosphere	Europe	ESRO	80
1968 February 2	Thumba	-	Centaure 1	ISRO 15.06 Aeronomy	India	ISRO	98
1968 February 21	Thumba	-	Centaure 1	ISRO 25.02 Aeronomy	India	ISRO	84
1968 February 22	Thumba	-	Centaure 1	ISRO 25.01 Aeronomy	India	ISRO	95
1968 March 23	Sonmiani	-	Centaure 1	Aeronomy	Pakistan	SUPARCO	81
1968 April 3	Sonmiani	-	Centaure 1	Aeronomy	Pakistan	SUPARCO	73
1968 May 8	Salto di Quirra	-	Centaure 1	ESRO C33 / 1 Ionosphere	Europe	ESRO	32
1968 May 15	Salto di Quirra	-	Centaure 1	ESRO C33 / 2 Ionosphere	Europe	ESRO	49
1968 November 3	Thumba	-	Centaure 1	ISRO 35.01 X-ray astronomy	India	ISRO	98
1969 February 9	Sonmiani	-	Centaure 1	FAILURE	Pakistan	SUPARCO	34
1969 February 13	Sonmiani	-	Centaure 1	FAILURE	Pakistan	SUPARCO	7
1969 July 10	Ile du Levant	-	Centaure 1	CNES C81 Aeronomy	France	CNES	67
1969 July 10	Ile du Levant	-	Centaure 1	CNES C82 Aeronomy	France	CNES	70
1971 April 26	El Arenosillo	-	Centaure 1	INTA C-7101 Aeronomy	France	CNES	80
1971 May 26	El Arenosillo	-	Centaure 1	INTA C-7102 Aeronomy /ionosphere	France	CNES	79
1971 May 27	El Arenosillo	-	Centaure 1	INTA C-7103 Aeronomy	France	CNES	78
1971 May 27	El Arenosillo	-	Centaure 1	INTA C-7104 Aeronomy	France	CNES	64
1971 September 13	Kourou	Kourou ALFS	Centaure 1	CNES C133 Aeronomy	France	CNES	90
1971 September 19	Kourou	Kourou ALFS	Centaure 1	CNES C132 Aeronomy	France	CNES	90
1971 September 19	Kourou	Kourou ALFS	Centaure 1	CNES C146 Aeronomy	France	CNES	90
1971 October 18	Kourou	Kourou ALFS	Centaure 1	CNES C154 / ISRO 5.13? Recovery test	India	ISRO	90
1972 April 7	Sonmiani	-	Centaure 1	Aeronomy / ionosphere	Pakistan	SUPARCO	90
1972 April 8	Sonmiani	-	Centaure 1	Aeronomy / ionosphere	Pakistan	SUPARCO	90
1977 December 12	El Arenosillo	-	Centaure 1	Ionosphere	France	INTA	90
1977 December 16	El Arenosillo	-	Centaure 1	Ionosphere	France	INTA	90
1969 February 26	Thumba		Centaure 2A	ISRO 45.02 Ionosphere mission	India	ISRO	145
1969 March 31	Sonmiani		Centaure 2A	Rehnuma 1 Aeronomy mission	Pakistan	SUPARCO	138
1969 December 7	Thumba		Centaure 2A	ISRO 45.03 Test / ionosphere / x-ray astronomy mission	India	ISRO	123
1971 January 7	Thumba		Centaure 2A	FAILURE: Failure	India	ISRO	10
1972 August 12	Thumba		Centaure 2A	ISRO 5.14 Ionosphere mission	India	ISRO	150
1972 August 17	Thumba		Centaure 2A	ISRO 5.16 Ionosphere mission	India	ISRO	151
1972 October 13	Thumba		Centaure 2A	ISRO 5.17 Fields mission	India	ISRO	120
1973 January 21	Thumba		Centaure 2A	ISRO 5.15 Fields mission	India	ISRO	165
1973 February 2	Thumba		Centaure 2A	ISRO 5.18 CO.07 Ionosphere mission	India	ISRO	147
1973 March 3	Thumba		Centaure 2A	ISRO 5.19 Fields mission	India	CNES, ISRO	125
1973 April 11	Thumba		Centaure 2A	ISRO 5.20 Fields mission	India	ISRO	151
1973 July 4	Thumba		Centaure 2A	ISRO 5.21 Fields mission	India	ISRO	150
1967 April 19	Kiruna	Kiruna C	Centaure 2B	ESRO C24/1 test	Europe	ESRO	123
1967 July 31	Kiruna	Kiruna C	Centaure 2B	ESRO C20 / 1 Aeronomy mission	Europe	ESRO	127
1967 July 31	Kiruna	Kiruna C	Centaure 2B	ESRO C32 / 1 Meteorite mission	Europe	ESRO	130
1967 November 24	Kiruna	Kiruna C	Centaure 2B	ESRO C13 / P Ionosphere mission	Europe	ESRO	160
1968 February 1	Kiruna	Kiruna C	Centaure 2B	ESRO C36 / 1 Aeronomy mission	Europe	ESRO	150
1968 February 4	Kiruna	Kiruna C	Centaure 2B	ESRO C36 / 2 Aeronomy mission	Europe	ESRO	146
1968 March 6	Kiruna	Kiruna C	Centaure 2B	ESRO C14 / P Ionosphere mission	Europe	ESRO	155
1968 May 20	Kiruna	Kiruna C	Centaure 2B	ESRO C42 / 1 Meteorites mission	Europe	ESRO	135
1968 June 7	Kiruna	Kiruna C	Centaure 2B	ESRO C42 / 2 Meteorites mission	Europe	ESRO	138
1968 June 8	Kiruna	Kiruna C	Centaure 2B	ESRO C32 / 2 Meteorites mission	Europe	ESRO	135
1968 July 30	Kiruna	Kiruna C	Centaure 2B	ESRO C20 / 2 Aeronomy mission	Europe	ESRO	135
1968 October 8	Kiruna	Kiruna C	Centaure 2B	ESRO C35 / 1 X-ray astronomy mission	Europe	ESRO	140
1968 October 15	Kiruna	Kiruna C	Centaure 2B	ESRO C45 / 1 Aeronomy mission	Europe	ESRO	160
1968 November 1	Kiruna	Kiruna C	Centaure 2B	ESRO C45 / 2 Aeronomy mission	Europe	ESRO	167
1969 February 25	Andoya	-	Centaure 2B	ESRO C49 / 1 (R3) Aurora mission	Europe	ESRO	136
1969 February 25	Andoya	-	Centaure 2B	ESRO C49 / 2 Aurora mission	Europe	ESRO	128
1969 March 15	Kiruna	Kiruna C	Centaure 2B	ESRO C52 / 1 Aurora mission	Europe	ESRO	136
1969 April 14	Kiruna	Kiruna C	Centaure 2B	ESRO C39 / 1 Aurora mission	Europe	ESRO	5.00
1969 April 15	Kiruna	Kiruna C	Centaure 2B	ESRO C39 / 2 Aurora mission	Europe	ESRO	134
1969 June 5	Kiruna	Kiruna C	Centaure 2B	ESRO C35 / 2 X-ray astronomy mission	Europe	ESRO	130
1969 August 11	Kiruna	Kiruna C	Centaure 2B	ESRO C51 / 1 Aeronomy mission	Europe	ESRO	112
1969 August 14	Kiruna	Kiruna C	Centaure 2B	ESRO C58 / 1 Meteorites mission	Europe	ESRO	112
1969 October 10	Kiruna	Kiruna C	Centaure 2B	ESRO C52 / 2 Aurora mission	Europe	ESRO	135
1969 November 27	Kiruna	Kiruna C	Centaure 2B	ESRO C62 / 1 Aurora mission	Europe	ESRO	160
1969 November 27	Kiruna	Kiruna C	Centaure 2B	ESRO C62 / 2 Aurora mission	Europe	ESRO	164
1970 February 4	Kiruna	Kiruna C	Centaure 2B	ESRO C57 / 1 Aeronomy mission	Europe	ESRO	172
1970 February 23	Kiruna	Kiruna C	Centaure 2B	ESRO C37 / 1 MPE Ba Ionosphere / barium release mission	Europe	ESRO	210
1970 April 3	Kiruna	Kiruna C	Centaure 2B	ESRO C57 / 2 Aeronomy mission	Europe	ESRO	173
1970 June 7	Kiruna	Kiruna C	Centaure 2B	ESRO C48 / 1 Solar ultraviolet mission	Europe	ESRO	162
1970 August 9	Kiruna	Kiruna C	Centaure 2B	ESRO C58 / 2 Ionosphere / meteorites mission	Europe	ESRO	114
1970 August 10	Kiruna	Kiruna C	Centaure 2B	ESRO C51 / 2 Aeronomy mission	Europe	ESRO	154
1970 August 19	Kiruna	Kiruna C	Centaure 2B	ESRO C48 / 2 Solar ultraviolet mission	Europe	ESRO	163
1971 January 17	Kiruna	Kiruna C	Centaure 2B	ESRO C37 / 2 MPE Ba Ionosphere / barium release mission	Europe	ESRO	215
1971 January 25	Kiruna	Kiruna C	Centaure 2B	ESRO C60 / 1 Chemical release / particles mission	Europe	ESRO	175
1971 January 26	Kiruna	Kiruna C	Centaure 2B	ESRO C60 / 2 Chemical release / particles mission	Europe	ESRO	167
1971 January 27	Kiruna	Kiruna C	Centaure 2B	ESRO C78 / 1 Aurora mission	Europe	ESRO	140
1971 November 22	Kiruna	Kiruna C	Centaure 2B	ESRO C78 / 2 Aurora mission	Europe	ESRO	138
1975 February 9	Thumba	-	Centaure 2B	ISRO 5.23 Ionosphere mission	India	ISRO	150
1975 February 19	Thumba	-	Centaure 2B	ISRO 5.25 CO.04 Ionosphere mission	India	ISRO	160
1975 February 19	Thumba	-	Centaure 2B	ISRO 5.24 Ionosphere mission	India	ISRO	164
1975 April 21	Thumba	-	Centaure 2B	ISRO 5.26 CO.22 Ionosphere mission	India	ISRO	157
1975 April 21	Thumba	-	Centaure 2B	ISRO 5.27 CO.21 Ionosphere mission	India	ISRO	156
1976 February 29	Thumba	-	Centaure 2B	ISRO 5.29 Aeronomy / ionosphere mission	India	ISRO	56
1976 March 24	Thumba	-	Centaure 2B	ISRO 5.30 Ionosphere / fields mission	India	ISRO	142
1976 March 26	Thumba	-	Centaure 2B	ISRO 5.31 Ionosphere / fields mission	India	ISRO	139
1976 April 18	Thumba	-	Centaure 2B	ISRO 5.32 Aeronomy / ionosphere mission	India	ISRO	152
1976 July 27	Thumba	-	Centaure 2B	ISRO 5.33 test	India	ISRO	97
1976 October 8	Thumba	-	Centaure 2B	ISRO 5.34 Plasma mission	India	ISRO	120
1976 October 14	Thumba	-	Centaure 2B	ISRO 5.35 Plasma mission	India	ISRO	0
1976 October 27	Thumba	-	Centaure 2B	ISRO 5.36 C-300 X-ray astronomy mission	India	ISRO	148
1976 November 18	Thumba	-	Centaure 2B	ISRO 5.37 Ionosphere mission	India	ISRO	128
1977 June 4	Thumba	-	Centaure 2B	ISRO CO.40 Ionosphere mission	France	ISRO	150
1978 February 21	Thumba	-	Centaure 2B	ISRO CO.47 Ionosphere mission	France	ISRO	150
1978 October 31	Thumba	-	Centaure 2B	ISRO 5.49	India	ISRO	150
1978 December 20	Thumba	-	Centaure 2B	ISRO C.51 Ionosphere mission	France	ISRO	160
1978 December 21	Thumba	-	Centaure 2B	ISRO CO.52 Ionosphere mission	France	ISRO	135
1979 February 21	Thumba	-	Centaure 2B	-	India	ISRO	72
1979 November 15	Thumba	-	Centaure 2B	AST 2 Technology test	India	ISRO	148
1980 February 16	Thumba	-	Centaure 2B	Eclipse D1 Eclipse ionosphere mission	France	ISRO	140
1980 February 16	Thumba	-	Centaure 2B	Eclipse D2 Eclipse ionosphere mission	France	ISRO	140
1980 February 16	Thumba	-	Centaure 2B	Eclipse Ba / Li Eclipse aeronomy mission	France	ISRO	140
1980 February 17	Thumba	-	Centaure 2B	NO Photometer Aeronomy mission	India	ISRO	150
1980 February 17	Thumba	-	Centaure 2B	Eclipse D3 Eclipse ionosphere mission	France	ISRO	140
1980 February 18	Thumba	-	Centaure 2B	O3 Photometer Aeronomy mission	France	ISRO	100
1981 February 12	Thumba	-	Centaure 2B	Langmuir / E Field Ionosphere mission	France	ISRO	158
1971 July 31	Kiruna	Kiruna C	Centaure 2C	ESRO C59/1 Aeronomy mission	Europe	ESRO	120
1971 August 1	Kiruna	Kiruna C	Centaure 2C	ESRO C59/2 Aeronomy mission	Europe	ESRO	119
1972 January 21	Kiruna	Kiruna C	Centaure 2C	ESRO C76/1 Particles/Auroral mission	Europe	ESRO	130
1972 January 22	Kiruna	Kiruna C	Centaure 2C	ESRO C76/2 Particles/Auroral mission	Europe	ESRO	131
1974 February 20	Kiruna	Kiruna C	Centaure 2C	SSC C111 / 1 Aurora mission	Sweden	SSC	155
1974 February 20	Kiruna	Kiruna C	Centaure 2C	SSC C111 / 2 Aurora mission	Sweden	SSC	152
1974 September 12	Kourou	Kourou ALFS	Centaure 2C	NO-II-1 Aeronomy mission	Belgium	CNES	140
1974 September 12	Kourou	Kourou ALFS	Centaure 2C	NO-II-2 Aeronomy mission	Belgium	CNES	140
1974 September 13	Kourou	Kourou ALFS	Centaure 2C	NO-II-3 Aeronomy mission	Belgium	CNES	140
1975 March 7	Kiruna	Kiruna C	Centaure 2C	SSC S13 Aeronomy mission	Sweden	SSC	109

== See also ==
- Belier
- Dauphin
- Dragon
- Éridan
