= Antarès (OPd-56-39-22D) =

French multistage rocket designed by ONERA for reentry studies

Antarès rocket

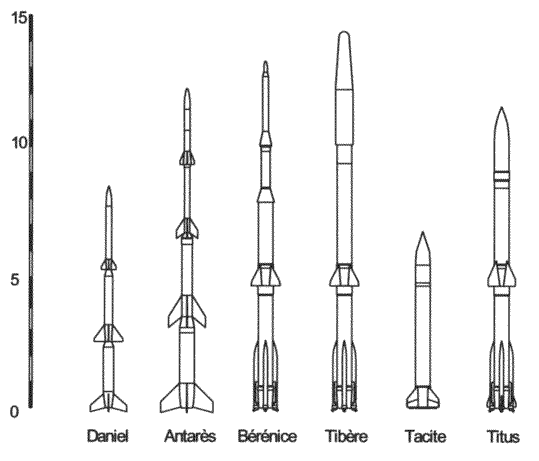
Antarès (second rocket) as part of the Onera sounding rocket family.

The Antarès (OPd-56-39-22D) was a French multistage rocket designed by ONERA for reentry studies. In the late 1950s, the study of missile warhead reentry necessitated the development of a more robust rocket than the existing OR, VD and OPd series. The Antarès rocket, designated OPd-56-39-22D during its developmental phase, was designed to facilitate the study of kinetic heating on objects flying at speeds up to Mach 7.

== Description ==
Measuring 12.2 meters in length and boasting a takeoff weight of up to 1785 kg, the rocket consisted of four stages. Three of these stages were ignited in an upward trajectory, reaching altitudes of up to 150 km, while the fourth stage accelerated the payload during its descent. Utilizing all four stages during ascent, Antares had the capability to send a payload of 35 kg to an altitude of 280 km.

The first stage featured a SEPR 734-1 Vesuve motor with a diameter of 56 cm and a length of 3.5 m, delivering a total impulse of 1025 kNs with less than 5 seconds burn time. The second stage, known as the sustainer stage Neptune, measured 39 cm in diameter and 3.2 m in length, providing 630 kNs with 32 seconds burn time. The third stage was a SEPR 685-4 Mimosa, 2.6 m long and 20 cm in diameter, delivering 167 kNs in less with a 5 seconds burn time. The fourth stage Mélanie motor was attached to the payload, measuring 22 cm in diameter.

== Launches ==
Between May 2, 1959, and May 13, 1961, a total of thirteen launches took place, with six of them falling under the designation Antarès. Antarès firings were preceded by a unique launch on January 30, 1959, involving the OPd-12-10-D rocket, consisting of an OPd-100 surrounded by three boosters with a diameter of 122 mm.

Antarès launches
Date	Launch site	Mission Description	Apogee (km)
1960 November 25	Ile du Levant	Re-entry Vehicle test	150
1960 November 30	Ile du Levant	Re-entry Vehicle test	150
1961 March 3	Ile du Levant	Re-entry Vehicle test	150
1961 March 6	Ile du Levant	Re-entry Vehicle test	150
1961 March 7	Ile du Levant	Re-entry Vehicle test	150
1961 May 13	Hammaguira	Ionosphere mission	280

== See also ==
- Bérénice (rocket)
- Mélanie (rocket)
- Veronique (rocket)
- French space program
