= Dauphin (rocket) =

French sounding rocket

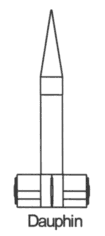
- Country of origin: France
- Successor: MR-30

sounding rocket

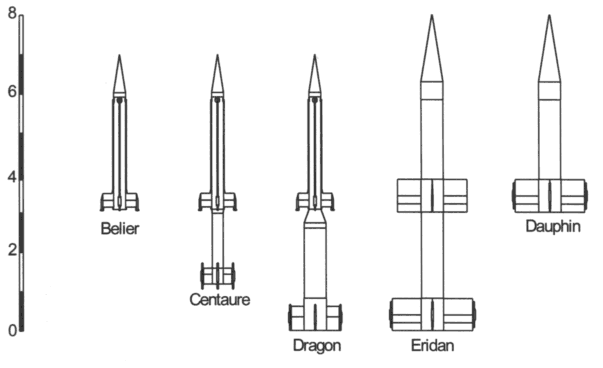
Sud-Aviation Belier rocket family.

The Dauphin is a French sounding rocket, flown six times between 1967 and 1979. It consists of a modification of the first stage of the Dragon with a larger payload nosecone.

The Dauphin has a diameter of 56 centimetres, a launch weight of 1.132 metric tons, a length of 6.21 metres, a takeoff thrust of 90 kN and a ceiling of 150 kilometres.

It belonged to the Stromboli family of solid-propellant including the Belier, the Centaure, and the Dragon, along with the Eridan.

== Launches ==
The first launch occurred on March 20, 1967 from Hammaguira and was a failure. The three next flights, from Ile du Levant and Biscarosse were successful.

On September 14, 1971, a Dauphin rocket was first launched from Kourou, conducting the PHARE (FU-196) Aeronomy mission. A final launch happened on February 8, 1979 to test the Ariane launch range.

Date	Launch site	Launch Complex	Mission Description	Apogee (km)
1967 March 20	Hammaguira	-	Failure.	0
1967 June 28	Ile du Levant	CERES	N/A	138
1968 March 8	Biscarosse	-	N/A	123
1968 March 28	Biscarosse	-	N/A	98
1971 September 14	Kourou	Kourou ALFS	PHARE (FU-196) Aeronomy mission	103
1979 February 8	Kourou	Kourou ALFS	Ariane range test	135

== See also ==
- Belier
- Centaure
- Dragon
- Éridan
