= Mélanie (rocket) =

Mélanie is a French solid rocket motor, 16 cm in diameter, initially used as first stage of the Monica rocket.

There are two versions, Mélanie and "2Mélanie" (exact name unknown) :

| Stage / Engine | Length (mm) | Diameter (mm) | Propellant mass (kg) | Total impulse (daNs) | Burning time (s) |
|---|---|---|---|---|---|
| Melanie | 1065 | 160 | 15 | 3100 | 5 |
| "2Melanie" | 2170 | 160 | 30 | 6200 | 5 |

The first version was used on Monica I, II and IVA; while the improved "2Melanie", with twice the propellant, was used on Monica III, IVB and V.

Melanie was later used in several ATEF and ONERA rockets. In the ONERA rockets, such as Daniel, Antarès and Berenice, Melanie was placed inside a 22 cm diameter cylindrical housing. This version delivered a total impulse of 48 kN.s with about 22 kilograms of propellant.

== See also ==
- Bèrènice
- Antarès (OPd-56-39-22D)
- Veronique (rocket)
- French space program
