= Bérénice (rocket) =

Four-stage French experimental rocket

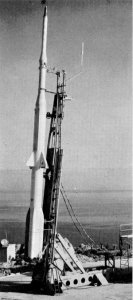
Bérénice French sounding rocket

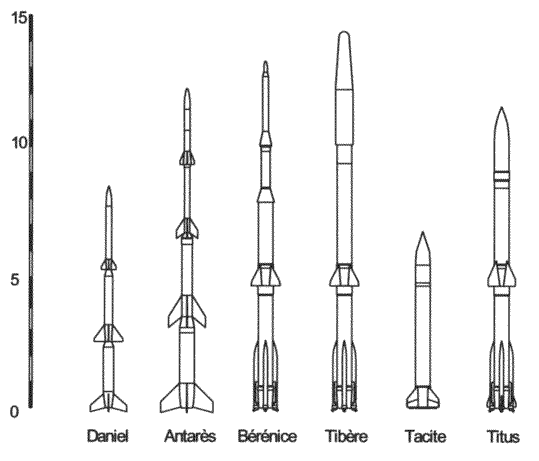
Bérénice (third rocket) as part of the Onera sounding rocket family.

Bérénice was the designation of a four-stage French atmospheric reentry test rocket, developed by O.N.E.R.A. (Office National d'Etudes et de Recherches Aérospatiales).

== Description ==
Bérénice was 13.25 m (43.5 ft) long, possessed a diameter of 0.56 m (1.8 ft) and weighed 3,340 kg (7,360 lb) at launch. The takeoff thrust of Bérénice, which could carry a payload of 3,340 kg (7,360 lb) to a height of 1,000 km (620 mi), amounted to 170 kN (38,000 lbf). The first stage, a SEPR-739 Stromboli, was stabilised by four SEPR-P167 rockets developing 34 kN (7,600 lbf). The second stage consisted of a SEPR-740 Stromboli, almost identical to the first stage. The third stage was a SEPR-P200 Tramontane and the fourth stage comprised a Mélanie rocket and payload.

== Launches ==
The twelve production rockets, Bérénice 001 to Bérénice 012, were launched by ONERA from Ile du Levant from 1962 to 1966.

Date	Mission Description	Apogee (km)
1962 June 27	Re-entry Vehicle test	270
1962 Q3	Re-entry Vehicle test	270
1962 July 6	Re-entry Vehicle test	270
1962 November 1	Re-entry Vehicle test	270
1963 June 27	Re-entry Vehicle test	270
1963 July 3	Re-entry Vehicle test	270
1964	Re-entry Vehicle test	270
1964	Re-entry Vehicle test	270
1964 October 1	Re-entry Vehicle test	250
1964 October 1	Re-entry Vehicle test	250
1965	Re-entry Vehicle test	270
1966	Titus test / solar mission	270

== See also ==
- Tibère (rocket)
- Antarès (OPd-56-39-22D)
- Mélanie (rocket)
- Veronique (rocket)
- French space program
