= List of rockets launched from Esrange =

This is a list of rockets launched from the Esrange rocket range in northern Sweden.

== 1966–1970 ==
Date	Vehicle	Mission	Results
19 November 1966	Centaure	ESRO C21/1	PS (123 km)
29 November 1966	Centaure	ESRO C09/2	S (149 km)
30 November 1966	Centaure	ESRO C09/1	S (147 km)
4 February 1967	Centaure	ESRO C21/2	S (129 km)
16 February 1967	Centaure	ESRO C10/1	PS (148 km)
22 February 1967	Centaure	ESRO C10/2	PS (158 km)
7 April 1967	Nike-Apache	K-NA-1/14.328IE	S (232 km)
8 April 1967	Nike-Apache	K-NA-2/14.329IE	S (236 km)
9 April 1967	Nike-Apache	K-NA-3/14.330IE	S (241 km)
10 April 1967	Nike-Apache	K-NA-4/14.331IE	S (230 km)
11 April 1967	Nike-Apache	K-NA-5/14.332IE	S (237 km)
19 April 1967	Centaure II	ESRO C24	PS (129 km)
31 July 1967	Centaure IIB	ESRO C20/1	S (133 km)
31 July 1967	Centaure IIB	ESRO C32/1	PS (127 km)
23 October 1967	Nike-Apache	K-NA-7	
24 November 1967	Centaure IIB	ESRO C13P	PS (165 km)
26 November 1967	Centaure	ESRO C31/1	S (126 km)
5 December 1967	Nike-Apache	K-NA-6/14.288IE	S
6 December 1967	Centaure	ESRO C31/2	S (129 km)
1 February 1968	Centaure IIB	ESRO C36/1	S (150 km)
4 February 1968	Centaure IIB	ESRO C36/2	S (145 km)
6 March 1968	Centaure IIB	ESRO C14P	S (155 km)
20 March 1968	Nike-Apache	K-NA-8	S (207 km)
23 March 1968	Nike-Apache	K-NA-9	S (211 km)
26 March 1968	Skylark 1	ESRO S16/1	PS (172 km)
6 April 1968	Nike-Apache	K-NA-10	VF
20 May 1968	Centaure IIB	ESRO C42/1	S (136 km)
7 June 1968	Centaure IIB	ESRO C42/2	S (138 km)
8 June 1968	Centaure IIB	ESRO C32/2	S (135 km)
11 June 1968	Nike-Apache	K-NA-13/14.355IA	S (183 km)
12 June 1968	Nike-Apache	K-NA-12/14.354IA	S (183 km)
30 July 1968	Centaure IIB	ESRO C20/2	PS (137 km)
12 August 1968	B.Arcas 2	ESRO A50/1	PS (96 km)
25 August 1968	B.Arcas 2	ESRO A50/2	PS (108 km)
8 October 1968	Centaure IIB	ESRO C35/1	EF (140 km)
15 October 1968	Centaure IIB	ESRO C45/1	PS (160 km)
24 October 1968	B. Arcas 2	SA1/15.53II	S (105 km)
1 November 1968	Centaure IIB	ESRO C45/2	S (167 km)
19 November 1968	Black Brant 3	K-BIII-14	S (167 km)
25 November 1968	Skylark 2	ESRO S43/1	S (212 km)
3 December 1968	Black Brant 3	K-BIII-16	S (166 km)
4 December 1968	Black Brant 3	K-BIII-15	S (170 km)
17 January 1969	Nike-Apache	SNA 2A-1/10.313IM	S (117 km)
19 January 1969	Nike-Cajun	SNC 2B-2/10.314IM	S (76 km)
23 January 1969	Nike-Apache	SNA 2A-3/10.315IM	S (116 km)
25 January 1969	Nike-Apache	SNA 2A-4/10.316IM	S (117 km)
3 February 1969	Petrel	(UK) P24K	ES (157 km)
11 February 1969	Petrel	(UK) P23K	PS (157 km)
14 February 1969	Petrel	(UK) P27K	S (149 km)
15 February 1969	Petrel	(UK) P28K	S (153 km)
15 March 1969	Nike-Apache	(GER) K-NA-11	
15 March 1969	Skylark 2	ESRO S43/2	S (210 km)
15 March 1969	Centaure 2B	ESRO C52/1	S (138 km)
16 March 1969	Nike-Apache	(GER) K-NA-17	
17 March 1969	Petrel	(UK) P29K	ES (148 km)
17 March 1969	Nike-Apache	(GER) K-NA-18	
17 March 1969	Petrel	(UK) P25K	S (151 km)
18 March 1969	Petrel	(UK) P11K	S (170 km)
29 March 1969	Petrel	(UK) P26K	S (150 km)
14 April 1969	Centaure 2B	ESRO C39/1	VF
15 April 1969	Centaure 2B	ESRO C39/2	PS (134 km)
5 June 1969	Centaure 2B	ESRO C35/2	S (130 km)
11 August 1969	Centaure 2B	ESRO C51/1	S (145 km)
14 August 1969	Centaure 2B	ESRO C58/1	PS (111 km)
5 October 1969	Skylark 2	ESRO S29/1	S (234 km)
10 October 1969	Centaure 2B	ESRO C52/2	S (138 km)
17 October 1969	Skylark 2	ESRO S29/2	S (230 km)
10 November 1969	Skylark 2	ESRO S46/1	S (214 km)
27 November 1969	Centaure 2B	ESRO C62/B	S (160 km)
27 November 1969	Centaure 2B	ESRO C62/A	S (162 km)
5 January 1970	Skua	(UK) UCL 1	
7 January 1970	Skua	(UK) UCL 2	
9 January 1970	Skua	(UK) UCL 3	
12 January 1970	Skua	(UK) UCL 4	
14 January 1970	Skua	(UK) UCL 5	
17 January 1970	Skua	(UK) UCL 6	
19 January 1970	Skua	(UK) UCL 7	
21 January 1970	Skua	(UK) UCL 8	
23 January 1970	Skua	(UK) UCL 9	
26 January 1970	Skua	(UK) UCL 10	
28 January 1970	Skua	(UK) UCL 11	
30 January 1970	Skua	(UK) UCL 12	
4 February 1970	Centaure	ESRO C57/1	S
14 February 1970	Skylark	ESRO S66/1	S
23 February 1970	Centaure	ESRO C37/1	
24 February 1970	Skylark	ESRO S70/1	S
25 February 1970	Skylark	ESRO S61/1	S (221 km)
26 February 1970	Skylark	ESRO S61/2	S (225 km)
19 March 1970	Skua	SSK3/1	(105 km)
19 March 1970	Skua	SSK3/2	(105 km)
19 March 1970	Skua	SSK3/3	(105 km)
19 March 1970	Skua	SSK3/4	(105 km)
19 March 1970	Skua	SSK3/5	(105 km)
2 April 1970	Skylark	ESRO S66/2	S
3 April 1970	Centaure	ESRO C57/2	S
4 April 1970	Skylark	ESRO S28/1	S
7 June 1970	Centaure	ESRO C48/1	S
8 August 1970	Nike-Apache	SNA 5-1/14.462DA	S
8 August 1970	Nike-Apache	SNA 6-1/14.455UA	S
8 August 1970	Nike-Apache	SNA 5-2/14.463DA	S
8 August 1970	Nike-Apache	SNA 6-2/14.454UA	S
9 August 1970	Centaure	ESRO C58/2	S (114 km)
9 August 1970	Petrel	ESRO SP4	
10 August 1970	Centaure	ESRO C51/2	S (153 km)
13 August 1970	Centaure	ESRO C48/2	S (114 km)
28 October 1970	Skylark	ESRO S67/1	S
29 October 1970	Skylark	ESRO S67/2	S

== 1971–1980 ==
Date	Vehicle	Mission	Results
8 January 1971	Skua	ESRO SK83/1	E
15 January 1971	Skua	ESRO SK83/2	S
17 January 1971	Centaure	ESRO C37/2	S (215 km)
17 January 1971	Skua	ESRO SK83/3	E
19 January 1971	Skua	ESRO SK83/4	S
21 January 1971	Skua	ESRO SK83/5	S
23 January 1971	Skua	ESRO SK83/6	PS
25 January 1971	Centaure	ESRO C60/1	S (170 km)
25 January 1971	Skua	ESRO SK83/7	S
26 January 1971	Centaure	ESRO C60/2	S (173 km)
26 January 1971	Petrel	ESRO P40	S
27 January 1971	Skua	ESRO SK83/8	PS
27 January 1971	Centaure	ESRO C78/1	S (142 km)
28 January 1971	Skylark	ESRO S46/2	S (220 km)
29 January 1971	Skua	ESRO SK83/9	S
31 January 1971	Skua	ESRO SK83/10	S
3 February 1971	Skua	ESRO SK83/11	S
8 February 1971	Skua	ESRO SK83/12	PS
9 February 1971	Skua	ESRO SK83/13	S
11 February 1971	Skua	ESRO SK83/14	S
12 February 1971	Skua	ESRO SK83/15	PS
12 March 1971	Skylark	ESRO S16/2	S
12 March 1971	Petrel	(UK) P69K	PS (150 km)
12 March 1971	Petrel	(UK) P92K	VF
15 March 1971	Skylark	ESRO S87/1	S (191 km)
24 March 1971	Skylark	ESRO S87/2	S (192 km)
5 April 1971	Petrel	(UK) P68K	S (134 km)
14 April 1971	Petrel	(UK) P61K	S (154 km)
15 April 1971	Petrel	(UK) P66K	S (131 km)
16 April 1971	Petrel	(UK) P62K	PS (138 km)
21 April 1971	Petrel	(UK) P64K	S (143 km)
21 April 1971	Petrel	(UK) P67K	S (128 km)
21 April 1971	Petrel	(UK) P63K	PS (164 km)
24 April 1971	Petrel	(UK) P54K	PS (162 km)
1 May 1971	Petrel	(UK) P65K	PS (146 km)
31 July 1971	Centaure	ESRO C59/1	
31 July 1971	Nike-Apache	NNA1/14.468UA	S (114 km)
31 July 1971	Nike-Apache	NNA2/14.469UA	S (106 km)
1 August 1971	Centaure	ESRO C59/2	
22 November 1971	Centaure	ESRO C78/2	S (140 km)
25 November 1971	Skylark	ESRO S70/2	S
21 January 1972	Centaure	ESRO C76/1	
22 January 1972	Centaure	ESRO C76/2	
7 February 1972	Nike-Tomahawk	S7-1/18.131IA	(180 km)
2 March 1972	Skylark	ESRO S77/1	S (237 km)
24 September 1972	Skylark 4	ESRO S77/2	S (227 km)
8 October 1972	Nike-Apache	NA3/14.499UA	S (109 km)
9 October 1972	Nike-Apache	NA4/14.501UA	S (109 km)
12 October 1972	Nike-Apache	NA5/14.502UA	S (109 km)
13 October 1972	Skylark 2	ESRO S105	S (207 km)
9 February 1973	Nike-Tomahawk	S7-2/18.132IA	S (182 km)
1 August 1973	Nike-Apache	NA6/14.515UA	S (109 km)
1 August 1973	Nike-Apache	NA7/14.516UA	S (111 km)
2 August 1973	Nike-Cajun	NC10/10.414GI	S (88 km)
4 August 1973	Skylark	SL1081/ER 1	VF
5 August 1973	Nike-Apache	NA9/14.507UI	S (183 km)
6 August 1973	Nike-Apache	NA8/14.517UA	S (103 km)
20 February 1974	Centaure 2C	ESRO C111/1	(155 km)
20 February 1974	Nike-Tomahawk	S10-1/18.133IE	S (234 km)
20 February 1974	Centaure 2C	ESRO C111/2	(152 km)
20 February 1974	Nike-Tomahawk	S10-2/18.134IE	S (235 km)
18 August 1974	Nike-Cajun	Ferdinand 36	(106 km)
5 March 1975	Nike-Apache	(SWE) S16-2	VF
7 March 1975	Centaure	(SWE) S13	(108 km)
13 March 1975	Nike-Apache	(SWE) S16-1	(104 km)
21 November 1975	Nike-Apache	(SWE) SO1	(131 km)
22 January 1976	Nike-Tomahawk	(SWE) S17-1	(208 km)
27 January 1976	Skylark	(GER) K-GR-73/TP-1	VF
1 February 1976	Nike-Apache	(SWE) S18-1	(105 km)
2 March 1976	Nike-Apache	(SWE) S21-1 Trigger	S (160 km)
6 March 1976	Nike-Tomahawk	(SWE) S17-2	(210 km)
30 March 1976	Aries	NASA 24.001IE Porcupine 1	VF
15 January 1977	Nike-Apache	(SWE) S18-2	(104 km)
8 February 1977	Skylark	(SWE) S22 Aurora	(212 km)
11 February 1977	Nike-Tomahawk	S21-2/18.213IE Trigger	S (200 km)
11 February 1977	Super Arcas	NASA 15.154UE/AR1	S (80 km)
15 February 1977	Nike-Apache	(SWE) S21-3 Trigger	S (163 km)
15 February 1977	Super Arcas	NASA 15.155UE/AR2	S (85 km)
14 March 1977	Nike-Apache	Firefly	(250 km)
20 March 1977	Aries	NASA 24.002IE Porcupine 2	S (458 km)
21 October 1977	Black Brant 8	(SWE) S19B	(370 km)
13 December 1977	Skylark 7	(GER) TEXUS 1	S (265 km)
13 April 1978	Nike-Orion	S27/31.006UE Twilight	S (154 km)
30 July 1978	Petrel	(UK) P205K	S (149 km)
30 July 1978	Petrel	MPI-1	(71 km)
30 July 1978	Nike-Orion	(SWE) S32 NLC-OBS	(62 km)
30 July 1978	Skylark 1	(SWE) S26-1 ION	(86 km)
12 August 1978	Petrel	MPI-2	(65 km)
12 August 1978	Petrel	(UK) P206K	S (150 km)
13 August 1978	Skylark 1	(SWE) S26-2 ION	(72 km)
13 September 1978	Orion	(GER) CK05	(62 km)
16 November 1978	Skylark 7	(GER) TEXUS 2	S (265 km)
25 January 1979	Petrel 2	(UK) P216K	S (179 km)
27 January 1979	Black Brant 5C	(SWE) S23L1 Substorm-Geos	(267 km)
27 January 1979	Petrel 2	(UK) P215K	S (180 km)
27 January 1979	Black Brant 8	(SWE) S23H Substorm-Geos	(414 km)
27 January 1979	Black Brant 5C	(SWE) S23L-2 Substorm-Geos	(266 km)
19 March 1979	Aries	NASA 24.005IE Porcupine 3	S (464 km)
31 March 1979	Aries	NASA 24.006IE Porcupine 4	S (452 km)
14 August 1979	Nike	(SWE) T3	(11 km)
21 August 1979	Nike-Orion	S27B/31.016UE Twilight B	S (149 km)
24 September 1979	Black Brant 8	S29/27.039UE Barium-Geos	S (396 km)
28 April 1980	Skylark 7	(GER) TEXUS 3	S (253 km)
26 July 1980	Petrel 2	(UK) P223K	ES (166 km)
7 November 1980	Super Loki	Energy Budget E9B	(85 km)
7 November 1980	Super Loki	Energy Budget E9A	(104 km)
10 November 1980	Super Loki	Energy Budget E9B	(85 km)
10 November 1980	Super Loki	Energy Budget E9A	(104 km)
10 November 1980	Super Loki	Energy Budget E9A	(104 km)
10 November 1980	Super Loki	Energy Budget E9B	(85 km)
11 November 1980	Super Loki	Energy Budget E9A	(104 km)
11 November 1980	Petrel 2	P221K Energy Budget E5	S (171 km)
11 November 1980	Nike-Orion	Energy Budget E6C	(198 km)
11 November 1980	Super Loki	Energy Budget E9A	(104 km)
11 November 1980	Skua 2	Energy Budget E7	(97 km)
11 November 1980	Super Loki	Energy Budget E9A	(104 km)
11 November 1989	Super Loki	Energy Budget E9B	(85 km)
12 November 1980	Super Loki	Energy Budget E9B	(85 km)
12 November 1980	Super Loki	Energy Budget E9A	(104 km)
12 November 1980	Super Loki	Energy Budget E9B	(85 km)
16 November 1980	Skylark 7	Energy Budget E2	S (230 km)
16 November 1980	Petrel 2	P220K Energy Budget E5	S (174 km)
16 November 1980	Taurus-Orion	NASA 33.010UE Energy Budget E11A	S (178 km)
16 November 1980	Taurus-Orion	NASA 33.011UE Energy Budget E11B	S (178 km)
16 November 1980	Nike-Orion	Energy Budget E6A	(168 km)
16 November 1980	Super Loki	Energy Budget E9A	(104 km)
16 November 1980	Skua 2	Energy Budget E7	(96 km)
16 November 1980	Super Loki	Energy Budget E9B	(85 km)
16 November 1980	Super Loki	Energy Budget E9A	(104 km)
16 November 1980	Super Loki	Energy Budget E9A	(104 km)
16 November 1980	Super Loki	Energy Budget E9B	(85 km)
27 November 1980	Super Loki	Energy Budget E9B	(85 km)
28 November 1980	Super Loki	Energy Budget E9A	(104 km)
28 November 1980	Super Loki	Energy Budget E9A	(104 km)
28 November 1980	Super Loki	Energy Budget E9B	(85 km)
1 December 1980	Taurus-Orion	NASA 33.009UE Energy Budget E11A	S (171 km)
1 December 1980	Petrel 2	P220K Energy Budget E5	S (196 km)
1 December 1980	Nike-Orion	Energy Budget E6A	(161 km)
1 December 1980	Super Loki	Energy Budget E9A	(104 km)
1 December 1980	Nike-Orion	Energy Budget E6B	(172 km)
1 December 1980	Super Loki	Energy Budget E9A	(104 km)
1 December 1980	Skua 2	Energy Budget E7	(92 km)
1 December 1980	Super Loki	Energy Budget E9B	(85 km)
1 December 1980	Super Loki	Energy Budget E9B	(85 km)

== 1981–1990 ==
Date	Vehicle	Mission	Results
7 February 1981	Petrel 2	(UK) P219K	S (171 km)
7 February 1981	Nike-Orion	(SWE) S35 Oxygen	(145 km)
30 April 1981	Skylark 7	(GER) TEXUS 3B	S (253 km)
8 May 1981	Skylark 7	(GER) TEXUS 4	S (258 km)
30 September 1981	Black Brant 8C	(SWE) S33 Pirat	S (270 km)
14 November 1981	Orion	(GER) STRAFAM	(61 km)
1 December 1981	Petrel 2	(UK) P224K	S (187 km)
9 December 1981	Petrel 2	(UK) P225K	S (188 km)
9 December 1981	Skylark 7	Energy Budget E2	(237 km)
9 December 1981	Skua 4	Energy Budget E8	(70 km)
9 December 1981	Skua 2	Energy Budget E7	(95 km)
16 December 1981	Petrel 2	(UK) P226K	S (187 km)
29 April 1982	Skylark 7	(GER) TEXUS 5	S (256 km)
8 May 1982	Skylark 7	(GER) TEXUS 6	S (256 km)
3 August 1982	Nike-Orion	(SWE) S37 CAMP-N	(119 km)
3 August 1982	Nike-Orion	(GER) STRAFAM	(114 km)
3 August 1982	Nike-Orion	(SWE) S37 CAMP-P	(118 km)
3 August 1982	Nike-Orion	(SWE) S39 SOAP/1	(134 km)
4 August 1982	Petrel	(UK) P235K	(140 km)
4 August 1982	Nike-Orion	TAD	(153 km)
4 August 1982	Super Loki	SULO-1	(84 km)
11 August 1982	Petrel	(UK) P214K	(129 km)
12 August 1982	Nike-Orion	(SWE) S39 SOAP/2	(135 km)
12 August 1982	Super Loki	SULO-2	(84 km)
19 January 1983	Black Brant 9C	(SWE) S36 AURELD-HIGH	(494 km)
27 April 1983	Orion	(GER) STRAFAM 3	(58 km)
5 May 1983	Skylark 7	(GER) TEXUS 7	S (227 km)
13 May 1983	Skylark 7	(GER) TEXUS 8	S (264 km)
19 September 1983	OTRAG 1-3-B	(GER) OTR-1	VF
31 January 1984	Nike-Orion	(SWE) S39 SOAP/WINE 1	(149 km)
31 January 1984	Orion	(GER) STRAFAM 4	(58 km)
10 February 1984	Nike-Orion	(SWE) S39 SOAP/WINE 2	(148 km)
10 February 1984	Skylark 6	(GER) MI 1	(179 km)
3 May 1984	Skylark 7	(GER) TEXUS 9	S (258 km)
15 May 1984	Skylark 7	(GER) TEXUS 10	S (242 km)
24 October 1984	Black Brant 5C	(SWE) S38 TOR	(216 km)
27 April 1985	Skylark 7	(GER) TEXUS 11	S (266 km)
6 May 1985	Skylark 7	(GER) TEXUS 12	S (253 km)
14 May 1985	Orion	(GER) STRAFAM 5	(57 km)
30 April 1986	Skylark 7	(GER) TEXUS 13	S (246 km)
12 May 1986	Skylark 7	(GER) TEXUS 14	EF (250 km)
26 July 1986	Super Loki 12A	MAED	(116 km)
26 July 1986	Nike-Orion	MAED 31.057GE	S (101 km)
26 July 1986	Nike-Orion	MAED 31.060UE	S (99 km)
26 July 1986	Super Loki 12A	MAED	(110 km)
26 July 1986	Nike-Orion	MAED 31.061UE	
27 July 1986	Super Loki 12A	MAED	(110 km)
27 July 1986	Super Loki 12A	MAED	(118 km)
27 July 1986	Super Loki 12A	MAED	(120 km)
27 July 1986	Super Loki 12A	MAED	(117 km)
4 November 1986	Taurus-Orion	(SWE) S41 AURELD VIP-1	(206 km)
12 December 1986	Taurus-Orion	(SWE) S41 AURELD VIP-2	(185 km)
17 February 1987	Orion	(GER) STRAFAM 2/1	(59 km)
19 March 1987	Black Brant 9B	(SWE) MASER 1	S (295 km)
2 May 1987	Skylark 7	(GER) TEXUS 14B	S (252 km)
6 May 1987	Orion	RASMUS 1	(61 km)
9 May 1987	Skylark 7	(GER) TEXUS 15	VF
23 November 1987	Skylark 7	(GER) TEXUS 16	VF
29 February 1988	Black Brant 9C	(SWE) MASER 2	S (318 km)
9 April 1988	Black Brant 5B	NASA 21.097GE ERRRIS I	S (128 km)
2 May 1988	Black Brant 8	(GER) TEXUS 17	S (285 km)
6 May 1988	Black Brant 8B	(GER) TEXUS 18	S (265 km)
9 May 1988	Skylark 7	(BAe) TEXUS TEST	S (262 km)
28 November 1988	Skylark 7	(GER) TEXUS 19	S (244 km)
2 December 1988	Skylark 7	(GER) TEXUS 20	S (238 km)
6 December 1988	Orion	RASMUS 2	(65 km)
30 January 1989	Orion	(GER) STRAFAM 2/2	(66 km)
7 February 1989	Skylark 2	(GER) ROSE F3	(124 km)
9 February 1989	Skylark 2	(GER) ROSE F4	(123 km)
3 March 1989	Black Brant 5B	NASA 21.100GE, ERRIS II	(124 km)
4 March 1989	Black Brant 5C	NASA 21.096GE, ERRIS II	(176 km)
10 April 1989	Black Brant 9C	(SWE) MASER 3	S (297 km)
30 April 1989	Skylark 7	(GER) TEXUS 21	S (268 km)
3 May 1989	Skylark 7	(GER) TEXUS 22	S (223 km)
25 November 1989	Skylark 7	(GER) TEXUS 23	S (249 km)
6 December 1989	Skylark 7	(GER) TEXUS 24	S (244 km)
25 January 1990	Orion	(GER) STRAFAM 2/3	(100 km)
20 February 1990	Nike-Orion	(SWE) ANODE	(100 km)
25 February 1990	Nike-Orion	(SWE) ATOMIC 1	(100 km)
27 February 1990	Nike-Orion	(SWE) ATOMIC 2	(100 km)
6 March 1990	Super Loki	(GER) SISSI So1	(60 km)
6 March 1990	Skylark 6	(GER) SISSI F1	(178 km)
6 March 1990	Orion	RASMUS 3	(79 km)
29 March 1990	Black Brant 9B	(SWE) MASER	S (317 km)
12 May 1990	Skylark 7	(GER) TEXUS 25	S (234 km)
14 May 1990	Skylark 7	(GER) TEXUS 26	S (235 km)
29 May 1990	Nike-Orion	(SWE) SPINRAC Test	(107 km)
25 July 1990	Super Loki	(GER) SISSI So2	(60 km)
26 July 1990	Super Loki	(GER) SISSI So3	(81 km)
26 July 1990	Skylark 6	(GER) SISSI F2	(168 km)
26 July 1990	Robin Dart	(GER) SISSI RD1	(115 km)
26 July 1990	Super Loki	(GER) SISSI So4	(84 km)
2 August 1990	Skylark 7	(GER) SISSI F3	(239 km)
2 August 1990	Robin Dart	(GER) SISSI RD2	(118 km)
2 August 1990	Super Loki	(GER) SISSI So5	(39 km)
15 November 1990	Skylark 7	(GER) TEXUS 27	S (249 km)
25 November 1990	Skylark 12	(GER+SWE) MAXUS Test	(534 km)

== 1991–2000 ==
Date	Vehicle	Mission	Results
3 February 1991	Orion	(GER) STRAFAM 3/1	(56 km)
9 April 1991	Orion	Rasmus 4	(65 km)
9 April 1991	Super Loki	(GER) SISSI 3	(72 km)
9 April 1991	Viper 3 RoDart	(GER) SISSI 3	
9 April 1991	Skylark 7	(GER) SISSI 3	(245 km)
9 April 1991	Viper 3 Robin	(GER) SISSI 3	
9 April 1991	Super Loki	(GER) SISSI 3	
9 April 1991	Super Loki	(GER) SISSI 3	(87 km)
8 May 1991	Castor 4B	(GER+SWE) MAXUS 1	VF (150 km)
1 August 1991	Viper 3 Robin	NLC91	(112 km)
1 August 1991	Super Arcas	NLC91	(88 km)
1 August 1991	Black Brant 5C	NASA 21.103GE NLC91	(100 km)
1 August 1991	Nike-Orion	NLC91	(93 km)
1 August 1991	Nike-Orion	NLC91	(131 km)
1 August 1991	Viper 3 Robin	NLC91	(111 km)
1 August 1991	Viper 3 Chaff	NLC91	
1 August 1991	Viper 3 Robin	NLC91	(112 km)
5 August 1991	Super Arcas	NLC91	(88 km)
5 August 1991	Viper 3 Robin	NLC91	(113 km)
9 August 1991	Viper 3 Robin	NLC91	VF (5.5 km)
9 August 1991	Viper 3 Robin	NLC91	(115 km)
9 August 1991	Nike-Orion	NLC91	(132 km)
9 August 1991	Nike-Orion	NLC91 (SWE) Decimals A	(89 km)
9 August 1991	Super Arcas	NLC91	
9 August 1991	Black Brant 5C	NASA 21.104GE NLC91	(101 km)
9 August 1991	Nike-Orion	NLC91	(97 km)
10 August 1991	Viper 3 Robin	NLC91	(115 km)
10 August 1991	Viper 3 Chaff	NLC91	
10 August 1991	Nike-Orion	NLC91 (SWE) Decimals B	(118 km)
10 August 1991	Viper 3 Robin	NLC91	(117 km)
23 November 1991	Skylark 7	(GER) TEXUS 28	S (239 km)
9 April 1992	Black Brant 9	(SWE) MASER 5	S (309 km)
18 August 1992	Nike-I.Orion	(GER) Mini TEXUS 1	(91 km)
8 November 1992	Castor 4B	(GER+SWE) MAXUS 1B	S (717 km)
22 November 1992	Skylark 7	(GER) TEXUS 29	S (230 km)
1 May 1993	Skylark 7	(GER) TEXUS 30	S (224 km)
28 July 1993	Viper US1	NLC 93	(116 km)
30 July 1993	Viper US2	NLC 93	(116 km)
2 August 1993	Nike-Orion	NLC93 (SWE) Decimals A	(98 km)
2 August 1993	Viper 1	NLC 93	(110 km)
2 August 1993	Nike-Orion	NLC93 (SWE) Decimals B	(105 km)
2 August 1993	Viper 2	NLC 93	(106 km)
2 August 1993	Viper 3	NLC 93	(106 km)
2 August 1993	Viper US3	NLC 93	(107 km)
2 November 1993	Skylark 7	(SWE) MASER 6	S (243 km)
26 November 1993	Skylark 7	(GER) TEXUS 31	S (257 km)
29 November 1993	Nike-I.Orion	(GER) Mini TEXUS 1	S (146 km)
19 February 1994	Orion	RASMUS 5	
3 May 1994	Nike-I.Orion	(GER) Mini TEXUS 2	S (157 km)
6 May 1994	Skylark 7	(GER) TEXUS 32	S (235 km)
30 November 1994	Skylark 7	(GER) TEXUS 33	S (267 km)
5 December 1994	I.Orion	(SWE) HYGROSOND	S (77 km)
29 April 1995	Nike-I.Orion	(GER) Mini TEXUS 4	S (125 km)
2 May 1995	Nike-I.Orion	(GER) Mini TEXUS 3	S (148 km)
29 November 1995	Castor 4B	(GER+SWE) MAXUS 2	S (706 km)
4 December 1995	I.Orion	(SWE) REXUS	S (89 km)
2 March 1996	Skylark 7	(GER) TEXUS 34	S (232 km)
3 May 1996	Skylark 7	(SWE) MASER 7	S (252 km)
24 November 1996	Skylark 7	(GER) TEXUS 35	S (267 km)
4 June 1997	I.Orion	GYROTEST	S (94 km)
26 January 1998	Nike-Orion	(SWE) MERMAID	S (128 km)
7 February 1998	Skylark 7	(GER) TEXUS 36	S
11 February 1998	Nike-I.Orion	(GER) Mini-TEXUS 5	S
3 March 1998	Nike-I.Orion	(SWE) ATOMIC 2A	S (134 km)
6 March 1998	Nike-I.Orion	(SWE) ATOMIC 2B	S (134 km)
7 October 1998	I.Orion	MAXUS Test	S
24 November 1998	Castor 4B	(GER+SWE) MAXUS 3	S (713 km)
3 December 1998	Nike-I.Orion	(GER) Mini-TEXUS 6	S
14 May 1999	Skylark 7	(SWE) MASER 8	S (260 km)
27 July 1999	Black Brant 5	NASA 21.122UE	
27 March 2000	Skylark 7	(GER) TEXUS 37	S (243 km)
2 April 2000	Skylark 7	(GER) TEXUS 38	S (250 km)

== 2001–2010 ==
Date	Vehicle	Mission	Results
19 February 2001	I.Orion	MAXUS Test	S (82 km)
29 April 2001	Castor 4B	(GER+SWE) MAXUS 4	S
8 May 2001	Skylark 7	(GER) TEXUS 39	S (248 km)
16 December 2001	Super Loki	(USA) HYGROSOND-2	S
16 December 2001	I.Orion	(SWE) HYGROSOND-2	S (90 km)
16 December 2001	Super Loki	(USA) HYGROSOND-2	S
16 December 2001	Super Loki	(USA) HYGROSOND-2	S
16 March 2002	Skylark 7	(SWE) MASER 9	S (260 km)
1 April 2003	Castor 4B	(ESA) MAXUS 5	S
22 November 2004	Castor 4B	(ESA) MAXUS 6	S
2 May 2005	Skylark 7	Maser-10	S (252 km)
1 December 2005	VSB-30	TEXUS 42	S
2 May 2006	Castor 4B	MAXUS 9	S (702 km)
10 May 2006	VSB-30	TEXUS-43	S (237 km)
7 February 2008	VSB-30 V03	(ESA) Texus 44	S (270 km)
21 February 2008	VSB-30	(ESA) Texus 45	S
15 May 2008	VSB-30	MASER-11	S (252 km)
22 October 2008	Nike-Orion	REXUS-4	S (175 km)
17 March 2009	Stratos	(NL) Student rocket	S (12.2 km)
22 May 2009	Nike-Orion	MAPHEUS	S (140.8 km)
22 November 2009	VSB-30	TEXUS-46	S (252 km)
29 November 2009	VSB-30	TEXUS-47	S (264 km)
26 March 2010	Castor 4B	MAXUS-8	S (700 km)
27 October 2010	Nike Orion	MAPHEUS 2	S (153 km)

== 2011–2020 ==
Date	Vehicle	Mission	Results
22 February 2011	Improved Orion	REXUS 9	S (80,3 km)
23 February 2011	Improved Orion	REXUS 10	S (82 km)
29 March 2011	VSB-30	TEXUS-49	S (268 km)
21 July 2011	Nike-Improved Orion	PHOCUS	S (107,8 km)
27 November 2011	VSB-30	TEXUS-48	S (263,2 km)
13 February 2012	VSB-30	MASER-12	S (260 km)
19 March 2012	Improved Orion	REXUS 12	S (82 km)
16 November 2012	Improved Orion	REXUS 11	S (79 km)
25 November 2012	Nike-Improved Orion	MAPHEUS 3	S (145 km)
12 April 2013	VSB 30	TEXUS-50	S (261 km)
7 May 2013	Improved Orion	REXUS 14	S (81,5 km)
9 May 2013	Improved Orion	REXUS 13	S (83,1 km)
15 July 2013	VS-30	MAPHEUS 4	
7 May 2014	PRO 98-6G	SERA-1	
28 May 2014	Improved Orion	REXUS 15	S (87 km)
29 May 2014	Improved Orion	REXUS 16	S (80 km)
22 February 2015	VSB-30	Cryofenix	
17 March 2015	Improved Orion	REXUS 17	S (87 km)
18 March 2015	Improved Orion	REXUS 18	S (81 km)
23 April 2015	VSB-30	TEXUS-51	S (259 km)
27 April 2015	VSB-30	TEXUS-52	S (255 km)
30 June 2015	Nike-Improved Orion	MAPHEUS 5	S (253 km)
2 October 2015	S31/Improved Orion	O-states 1	S (247 km)
19 October 2015	S31/Improved Orion	O-states 2	S (243.2 km)
22 October 2015	Hybrid	Stern Erig	
22 October 2015	Hybrid	Stern HyEnd	
27 October 2015	Hybrid	Stern Decan 1	
29 October 2015	Hybrid	Stern Decan 2	
1 December 2015	VSB-30	MASER 13	S (261 km)
23 January 2016	VSB-30	TEXUS 53	S (252.6 km)
2 February 2016	S-30	Spider	S (137.9 km)
15 March 2016	Improved Orion	REXUS 20	S (78 km)
18 March 2016	Improved Orion	REXUS 19	S (78 km)
14 April 2016	Hybrid	Stern Aquasonic	
16 April 2016	Hybrid	Stern Zephyr	
28 April 2016	Cesaroni Pro98-6G	SERA-2	S (5.1 km)
19 July 2016	Terrier-Improved Orion	Rotex-T	
31 October 2016	Hybrid	Stern 2 HyEnd 1	
8 November 2016	Hybrid	Stern 2 HyEnd 2	
15 March 2017	Improved Orion	REXUS 21	S (85.6 km)
16 March 2017	Improved Orion	REXUS 22	S (84.3 km)
7 April 2017	Castor 4B	MAXUS 9	S
26 April 2017	3x Cesaroni Pro98-6G	SERA-3	S (5 km)
12 March 2018	Improved Orion	REXUS 24	
13 May 2018	VSB-30	TEXUS 54	S (239 km)
31 May 2018	VSB-30	TEXUS 55	S (255 km)
17 February 2019	S-31 Improved Malemute	MAPHEUS 7	S (248 km)
4 March 2019	Improved Orion	REXUS 23	S (75 km)
11 March 2019	Improved Orion	REXUS 25	S (80 km)
19 March 2019	Improved Orion	REXUS 26	S (82 km)
24 June 2019	VSB-30	MASER 14	S (260 km)
15 November 2019	VSB-30	TEXUS 56	S (256 km)
19 February 2020	Improved Malemute	SPIDER-2	S (120 km)

== 2021–2030 ==
Date	Vehicle	Mission	Results
14 May 2021	Improved Malemute/Improved Malemute	MAPHEUS 11	S (221 km)
23 June 2021	S-31/Improved Orion	BOLT-1	S (281 km)
6 December 2021	Improved Malemute/Improved Malemute	MAPHEUS 10	S (259 km)
29 January 2022	Improved Malemute/Improved Malemute	MAPHEUS 9	S (253 km)
1 October 2022	VSB-30	TEXUS 57	S (240 km)
21 October 2022	Improved Malemute/Improved Malemute	MAPHEUS 12	S (260 km)
5 November 2022	Improved Orion	REXUS 27	S (84.9 km)
7 November 2022	Improved Orion	REXUS 28	S (95.7 km)
23 November 2022	VSB-30	S1X3/MASER 15	S (260 km)
23 March 2023	Improved Malemute/Improved Orion	BROR	S (240 km)
29 March 2023	Improved Orion	REXUS 30	S (77.3 km)
1 April 2023	Improved Orion	REXUS 29	S (76.9 km)
18 April 2023	N_{2}ORTH	HyEnd	S (64 km)
24 April 2023	VSB-30	TEXUS 58	S (250 km)
24 April 2023	N_{2}ORTH	HyEnd	F
22 May 2023	Improved Malemute/Improved Malemute	MAPHEUS 13	S (225.5 km)
3 June 2023	Cesaroni Pro98-6G	SERA-4	S (2 km)
10 October 2023	S-31/Improved Orion	HIFLIER-1	S (190 km)
2 December 2023	VSB-30	MAIUS-2	S (234 km)
7 February 2024	T-Minus DART	PRIME	PS
12 February 2024	VSB-30	TEXUS 59	S (264.5 km)
27 February 2024	Red Kite/Improved Malemute	MAPHEUS 14	S (265 km)
12 March 2024	Improved Orion	REXUS 32	S (75.9 km)
14 March 2024	Improved Orion	REXUS 31	S (78.5 km)
24 March 2024	VSB-30	TEXUS 60	S (251.7 km)
24 October 2024	STAHR	STAHR	S (21 km)
11 November 2024	Red Kite/Improved Malemute	MAPHEUS-15	S (309 km)
26 November 2024	VSB-30	S1X4/MASER 16	S (256 km)
24 January 2025	Improved Malemute	ORIGIN I	S
11 March 2025	Improved Orion	REXUS 33	S (78 km)
13 March 2025	Improved Orion	REXUS 34	S
8 April 2025	T-Minus DART	PRIME 2?	S
22 May 2025	SERENDIPITY	SERENDIPITY	S (3 km)
