= Cajun (disambiguation) =

Cajun or Cajan refers to a people and culture of French descent in Southern Louisiana:

- Cajuns, an ethnic group of French descent in Southern Louisiana
  - Cajun Country
  - Cajun cuisine
  - Cajun English
  - Cajun French
  - Cajun Jig
  - Cajun Jitterbug
  - Cajun music
- Cajans, an exonym referring to a group of mixed descent in Southern Alabama
- Ragin' Cajuns, nickname of the University of Louisiana at Lafayette athletic teams (1960s–)
  - Cajundome
  - Cajun Field

see also Ragin' Cajun (disambiguation) for other uses

Other names:

- Cajun (horse)
- Cajun (rocket), Cajun Dart and Nike-Cajun, American sounding rockets (1950s–1970s)
- Cajun Cliffhanger, amusement ride at Six Flags Great America (1976–2000)
- Cajun Navy
- Louisiana Cajun Pelicans, American Basketball Association team based in Baton Rouge (2005–)
