= MQR-13 BMTS =

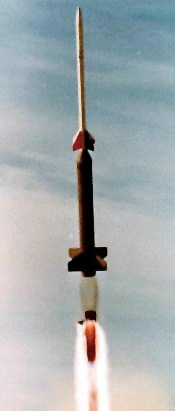
- Type: Target drone
- Place of origin: United States

Service history
- In service: 1966–1968
- Used by: United States Army

Production history
- Manufacturer: U.S. Army Missile Command

Specifications (Configuration I, Version I)
- Mass: 1,650 pounds (750 kg)
- Length: 25.9 ft (7.89 m)
- Diameter: 16.5 inches (420 mm)
- Wingspan: 5.1 ft (1.54 m)
- Engine: 1st stage, Allegheny M5; 55,000 lb_{f} (246 kN); 2nd stage, Thiokol TE 307; 4,700 lb_{f} (21.1 kN)
- Propellant: Solid fuel
- Operational range: 202 mi (325 km)
- Flight ceiling: 81 mi (130 km)
- Maximum speed: 6,000 feet per second (1,800 m/s)

The XMQR-13A Ballistic Missile Target System (BMTS) was an unguided target rocket developed by the United States Army during the 1960s, intended for use in the development of missile defense systems. Utilising off-the-shelf parts in four different configurations, the BMTS was utilised in a series of launches in the late 1960s supporting tests of several missile systems.

== Design and development ==
Developed by the U.S. Army Missile Command (USAMICOM), the Ballistic Missile Target System, or BMTS, was intended as a ballistic target rocket, utilising as many parts from existing missiles as possible, to be used in the development and evaluation of defense systems against ballistic missile attack.

Given the designation XMQR-13A in 1967, the BMTS could be launched in four different configurations. Configuration 1 used the booster from a Nike Ajax surface-to-air missile, with either an Apache (Version 1), Cajun (version 2), or inert Cajun (version 3) upper stage. Configuration 2 omitted the upper stage. All four variations fitted a radar enhancer in the nose cone to assist in target acquisition by the targeting missile.

== Operational history ==
The XMQR-13A was used in a series of test firings between 1966 and 1968, primarily from the White Sands Missile Range, and using a modified Terrier portable launcher. The test launches supported a variety of antimissile development programs, including that of the HAWK, and was intended for use in the development of SAM-D.

The Nike-Apache and Nike-Cajun rocket configurations were also use extensively as sounding rockets for experimental missions conducted by NASA.

== See also ==
- Nike-Apache
- Nike-Cajun
