= Cajun Dart =

American sounding rocket

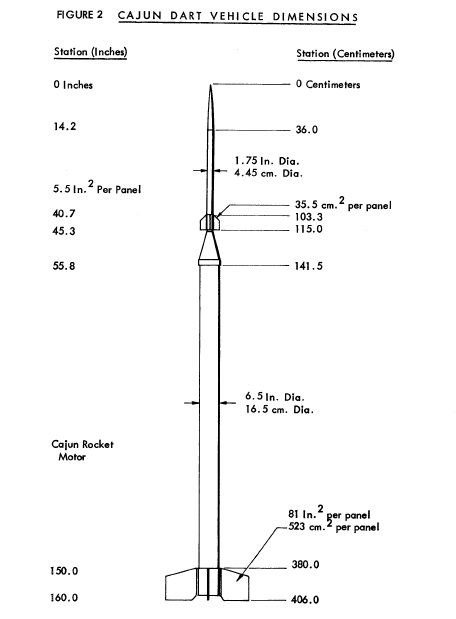
Cajun Dart diagram with dimensions

Cajun Dart is the designation of an American sounding rocket. The Cajun Dart was used 87 times between 1964 and 1970. The Cajun rocket motor was developed from Deacon.

Staged on top of a Nike rocket, it was part of the Nike-Cajun sounding rocket; it was also used as part of the Terasca three-stage rocket.

== Specifications ==
- Takeoff thrust: 36 kN
- Maximum flight height: 74 km
- Takeoff weight: 100 kg
- Diameter: 0.17 m
- Length: 4.10 m
