= MIM-3 Nike Ajax =

First operational guided surface-to-air missile

Nike Ajax
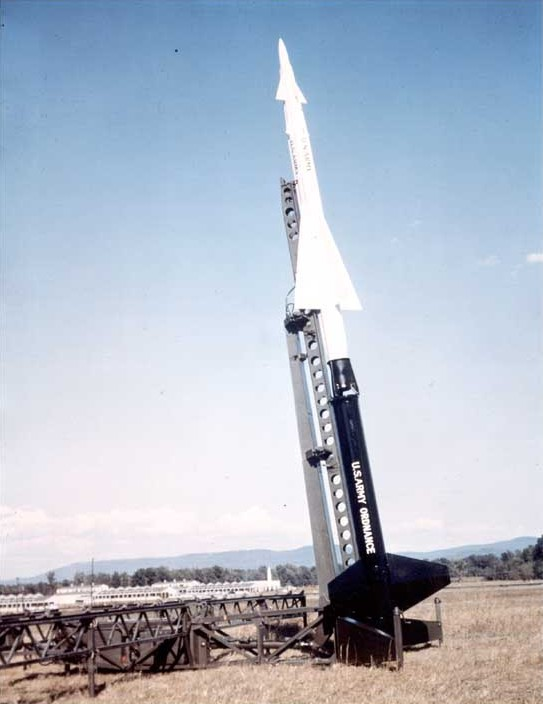
- A Nike Ajax in firing position.
- Type: Surface-to-air missile
- Place of origin: United States

Service history
- In service: 1954–1970
- Used by: United States Army and allies

Production history
- Manufacturer: Bell Labs; Douglas Aircraft Company
- Unit cost: US$19,300 (equivalent to $215,372 in 2025) (flyaway, 1958); US$61,000 (equivalent to $680,709 in 2025) total
- Produced: 1952

Specifications
- Mass: 2,460 lb (1.12 t) total; 1,000 lb (0.454 t) sustainer; 1,460 lb (0.7 t) booster
- Length: 32 ft 8 in (9.96 m) overall; 20 ft 11 in (6.38 m) sustainer; 13 ft 2 in (4.01 m) booster
- Diameter: 14.6 in (0.37 m) sustainer; 16.2 in (0.41 m) booster
- Wingspan: 50 in (1.3 m) sustainer; 76 in (1.9 m) booster
- Warhead: 3 warheads using Comp B
- Detonation mechanism: radio command
- Engine: Solid rocket booster; liquid fuel sustainer; 55,000 lbf (240 kN) booster; 2,600 lbf (12 kN) sustainer
- Propellant: JP-4/UDMH and RFNA (sustainer)
- Operational range: 30 mi (48 km)
- Flight ceiling: 70,000 ft (21,000 m)
- Maximum speed: Mach 2.25 (2,760 km/h; 1,710 mph) (@ 50,000 ft (15,000 m))
- Guidance system: command guidance
- Launch platform: fixed erector/launchers

The Nike Ajax was an American guided surface-to-air missile (SAM) developed by Bell Labs for the United States Army. The world's first operational guided surface-to-air missile, the Nike Ajax was designed to attack conventional bomber aircraft flying at high subsonic speeds and altitudes above 50,000 feet (15 km). Nike entered service in 1954 and was initially deployed within the United States to defend against Soviet bomber attacks, though it was later deployed overseas to protect US military bases, and was also sold to various allied militaries. Some examples remained in use until the 1970s.

Originally known simply as "Nike", it gained the "Ajax" as part of a 1956 renaming effort that resulted from the introduction of the similarly named Nike Hercules. It was initially given the identifier SAM-A-7 (Surface-to-air, Army, design 7) as part of an early tri-service identification system, but later changed to MIM-3 in 1962. (Note: Nike was initially designated SAM-G-7, and later changed to SAM-A-7. Originally the Air Force used A while the Army used G, but the Air Force abandoned the 1947 tri-service designation system in 1951 and the Army took over the A designation.)

Technological development during the 1950s quickly rendered the MIM-3 obsolete. It was unable to defend against more capable bombers or multiple targets in formation, and had relatively short range. Even while Nike was being deployed, these concerns led to the contracts for the greatly improved MIM-14 Nike Hercules, which began deployment in 1959. As Hercules developed, the threat moved from bombers to ICBMs, and the LIM-49 Nike Zeus anti-ballistic missile project started to address these. All of the Nike projects were led by Bell Labs, due to their early work in radar guidance systems during World War II.

Part of the Nike Ajax development program designed a new solid fuel rocket motor used for the missile's booster. This had originally been designed for the United States Navy's missiles, and was enlarged for the Nike efforts. The rocket found applications outside the military world as the Ajax missiles were decommissioned in the 1960s. Many sounding rockets used the booster as their first or second stage, and many of those used "Nike" in their name.

== History ==
=== Background ===
The inherent inaccuracy of anti-aircraft artillery means that when shells reach their targets they are effectively randomly distributed in the target area. This distribution is much larger than the lethal radius of any given shell, so the chance that any one shell will damage or destroy its target is very small. Successful anti-aircraft gunnery therefore requires as many rounds to be fired as possible. During the Blitz, British anti-aircraft gunners fired 49,044 shells in January 1941 for 12 kills, almost 4,100 shells per success. German gunners did better against Allied daylight raids, firing an estimated average of 2,800 shells to down a single Boeing B-17 Flying Fortress.

Flying faster means that the aircraft passes through the range of a gun more rapidly, reducing the number of rounds a particular gun can fire at that aircraft. Flying at higher altitudes often has a similar effect, as it requires larger shells to reach those altitudes, and this typically results in slower firing rates for a variety of practical reasons. Aircraft using jet engines roughly doubled the speed and altitude over piston-powered designs, limiting the number of shells so greatly that the chance of hitting the bomber dropped almost to zero. As early as 1942, German flak commanders were keenly aware of the problem, and expecting to face jet bombers, they began developing missiles to supplant their guns.

The western allies maintained air superiority for much of the war and their anti-aircraft systems did not see as much pressure to improve. Nevertheless, by the mid-war period, the US Army had reached the same conclusion as their German counterparts: artillery-based anti-aircraft weapons were no longer useful. Accordingly, in February 1944 the Army Ground Forces sent the Army Service Forces (ASF) a request for information on the possibility of building a "major caliber anti-aircraft rocket torpedo". The ASF concluded that it was too early to tell if this was possible, and suggested concentrating on a program of general rocket development instead.

The introduction of German jet bombers late in 1944 led to a re-evaluation of this policy, and on 26 January 1945 the Army Chief of Ordnance issued a requirement for a new guided missile system. The request was passed to Bell Labs, then a world leader in radar, radio control, and automated aiming systems (see Hendrik Wade Bode).

=== Project Nike ===
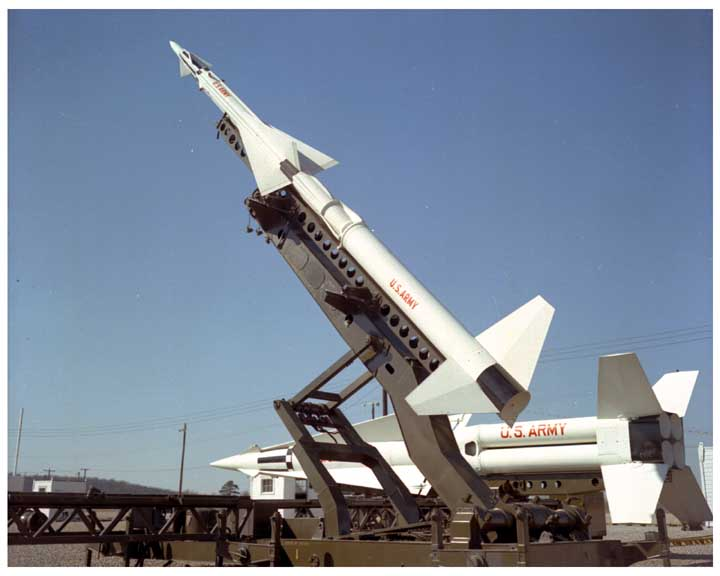
MIM-3 Nike on a launcher

Bell accepted the challenge, and Project Nike was officially formed on 8 February 1945. The Bell team was given the task of attacking bombers flying at 500 mph (800 km/h) or more, (Note: Cagle says 600 mph (970 km/h), but many other sources put it at 500 or more.) at altitudes between 20,000 and 60,000 feet (6,100 and 18,300 m), and performing a 3 g turn at 40,000 feet (12,000 m). Bell reported back on 14 May 1945 (and a formal report the next day) that such a development was possible. They concluded that:

A supersonic rocket missile should be vertically launched under the thrust of a solid-fuel booster which was then to be dropped; thence, self-propelled by a liquid-fuel motor, the missile should be guided to a predicted intercept point in space and detonated by remote control commands; these commands should be transmitted by radio signals determined by a ground-based computer associated with radar which would track both the target and the missile in flight.

This was not the only Army missile project at the time; the US Army Air Force was involved in studies of the Ground-to-Air Pilotless Aircraft (GAPA), a slightly longer-range system based on what was essentially a drone aircraft. Bell had been invited to take part in GAPA as well, but declined as they wanted to concentrate on Nike. GAPA was opened to tender, and was picked up by other companies, notably Boeing. This led to a semi-formalized agreement that the Army Air Force and the Ordnance Corps would split development based on whether or not the design "depend[ed] for sustenance primarily on the lift of aerodynamic forces" like GAPA, or "primary on the momentum of the missile" like Nike.

As part of the Key West Agreement, GAPA was handed to the newly formed US Air Force in 1948, when that force evolved out of the Army Air Force.

=== Building the team ===
Nike Ajax test firing against a B-17 Flying Fortress

At the ranges and speeds being considered, even a supersonic rocket will take enough time to reach the target that the missile needs to lead the bomber to intercept it. Bell proposed a system using two radars, one tracking the target, and another tracking the missile. An analog computer would calculate the impact point and send guidance signals to the missile encoded in the second radar's signals, and detonate the warhead on command (as opposed to a proximity fuse).

The Ballistics Research Laboratory was asked to calculate the proper warhead shaping to maximize the chance of a hit. Once determined, Picatinny Arsenal would produce the warhead, and Frankford Arsenal would provide a fuse. Douglas Aircraft would provide the missile airframe and carry out aerodynamic studies, while Aerojet would supply a solid fuel rocket booster for launch, and Bell Aircraft would provide a liquid fuel rocket for the upper stage sustainer.

The initial design used a thin upper stage with eight JATO-derived boosters wrapped around its tail. The resulting cluster looked quite boxy at launch time. It was expected that the 93,000 lbf (410 kN) of booster power would accelerate the missile to supersonic speeds of 1,750 feet per second (1,190 mph; 530 m/s) at the end of a booster phase of 1.8 seconds, increasing almost continuously to about 2,500 feet per second (1,700 mph; 760 m/s) at the end of the liquid engine's firing, then decreasing to 1,150 feet per second (780 mph; 350 m/s) during the zooming period.

Early in the program, it was realized that existing radar systems based on the conical scanning method did not supply the performance needed for a high-speed missile. In particular, conical scanning radars required some time to settle on an accurate track. The decision was made to use a monopulse radar system for Nike. Two systems were considered, one using phased signals, and another using signal timing known as the "amplitude null system", with the latter being selected. This study resulted in the development of tunable magnetrons for the 250 kilowatt X-band radars for tracking, and 1000 kilowatt S-band radar for target detection. Experiments demonstrated that the radar return from the missile at high altitudes was limited, and when calls for an extended altitude of 150,000 feet (46,000 m) were added to the requirements, a transponder was added to the missile to boost the return.

These changes, and many more, were summarized in a 28 January 1946 report. The project called for four rounds of test launches starting in 1946, with the aim of having a production design by 1949.

=== Testing ===
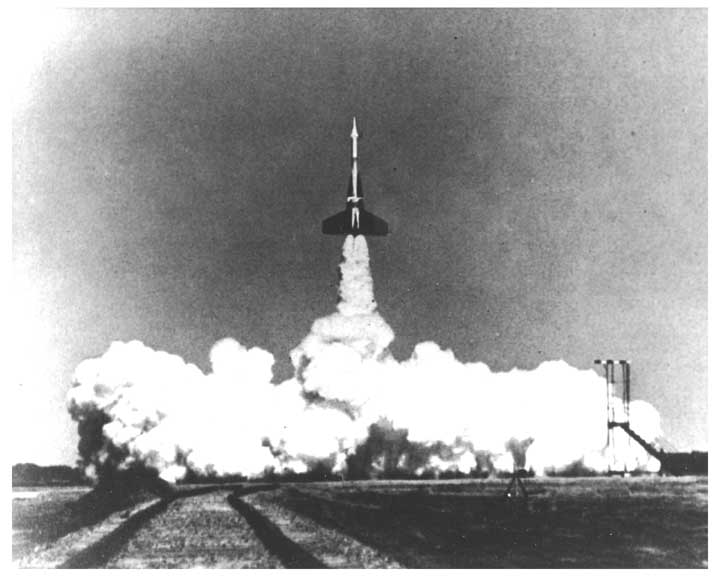
The early model Nike had eight JATO bottles in a cluster, demanding large fins for stability.

The first test firing of a static round was carried out at the White Sands Proving Ground on 17 September 1946 and then returned to Douglas in California for study. The next week an unguided example was launched, and similar tests followed until 28 January 1947, ending the first test series. During one test a missile reached an altitude of 140,000 feet. A second test series followed in September and October 1947, including several improvements in the design in order to address problems with the booster. A further series in 1948, originally planned for 1946, continued to demonstrate problems.

Eventually, the team was forced to give up on the clustered booster concept. Invariably small differences in thrust between the different JATO bottles would lead to significant thrust asymmetries, ones that overwhelmed the stabilizing effect of the fins in spite of them being very large. Instead, the project selected a larger booster being developed by the US Navy's Operation Bumblebee, creating a new version known as the Allegheny JATO T39 2.6DS-51,000. The Navy's similar booster can be seen on the RIM-2 Terrier.

A new series of test firings started in September 1948 but were stopped until May 1949 after modifications were carried out. Funding problems then delayed the program until January 1950. From late January through April another 16 missiles were fired, with much better results.

=== Accelerating development ===
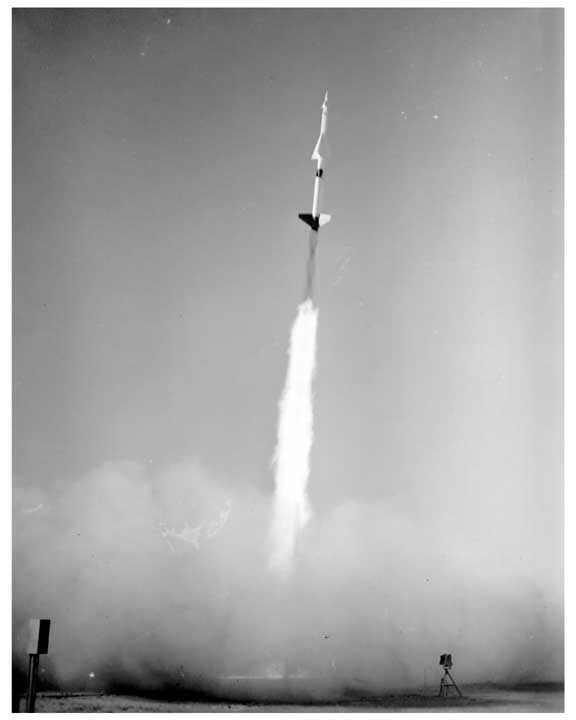
Test launch of the production model Nike Ajax missile with the new booster

During its early development, the Nike project had not been considered very important. A series of events in the late 1940s led to a re-appraisal of the situation, including the Soviet atomic test in 1949, the communist victory in China, and the Berlin Blockade. The June 1950 opening of the Korea War brought all of this to a head and new urgency was given to US defense. In October 1950, US Secretary of Defense Charles E. Wilson appointed Kaufman Keller to the newly created position of Director of Guided Weapons to speed their development.

Keller examined the various ongoing projects and decided that Nike was the best developed. He recommended that development of Nike be accelerated and that an initial production run of 60 launch stations and 1,000 missiles should be completed by 31 December 1952, with continued production of 1,000 a month after that date. In January 1951, Wilson approved the plan, in spite of additional testing being required. A new test series of the proposed production model was carried out starting in October, and on 27 November 1951, Nike successfully intercepted a QB-17 target drone. Twenty-two further tests followed that year. In the new year a new test series started, including a live-fire attack on a QB-17 in April 1952 that was viewed by visiting senior officers.

=== Production ===
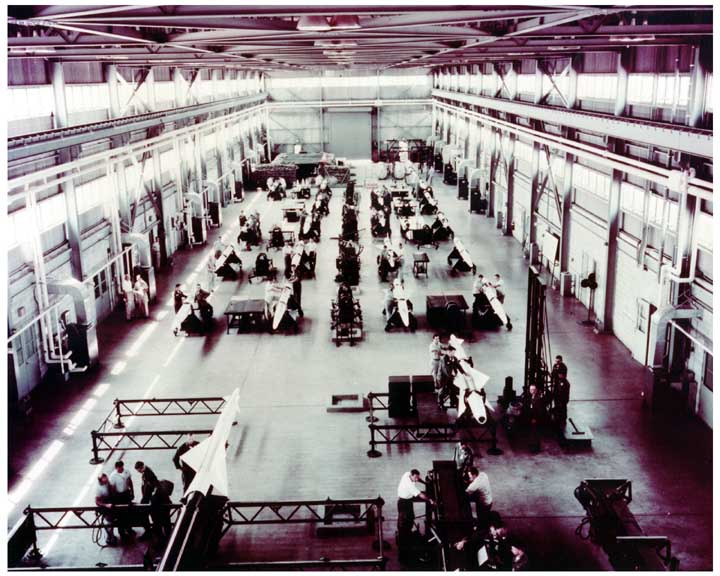
The Nike Ajax assembly line

Production was launched in August 1952. By the end of the year, three complete ground systems and 1,000 missiles had been delivered to White Sands. The complete system was set up by January 1953, and an underground launch site first fired on 5 June 1953. Crew training was carried out at Fort Bliss with the missiles fired toward White Sands. Service deliveries began that year, and eventually, a total of 350 launch systems and 13,714 missiles were produced. In 1957, the National Guard started taking over the anti-aircraft role, replacing regular army units at Bliss.

=== Deployment ===
"The Nike Hercules Story" (1960) de-classified official Nike Hercules and Ajax information film reel.

Deployment of the Nike I was under the direction of the Army Anti-Aircraft Command (ARAACOM). ARAACOM initially proposed a series of widespread bases surrounding cities and major military sites. However, while planning the deployment around Chicago, it became clear that Lake Michigan would force sites protecting approach from the east to be located in the city itself. Moreover, various scenarios demonstrated that having a staggered two-layer layout of the sites would offer much greater protection, which argued for some bases to be located closer to the urban centers.

For range safety reasons, launch sites had to have considerable empty land around them in the event of an accidental warhead or fuel explosion. Originally this would require about 119 acres (48 ha) of land per site. This presented a serious problem for the planners, and especially the Corps of Engineers Real Estate Offices. As early as 1952 they had asked for a solution, which led to design architect Leon Chatelain Jr. developing an underground configuration.

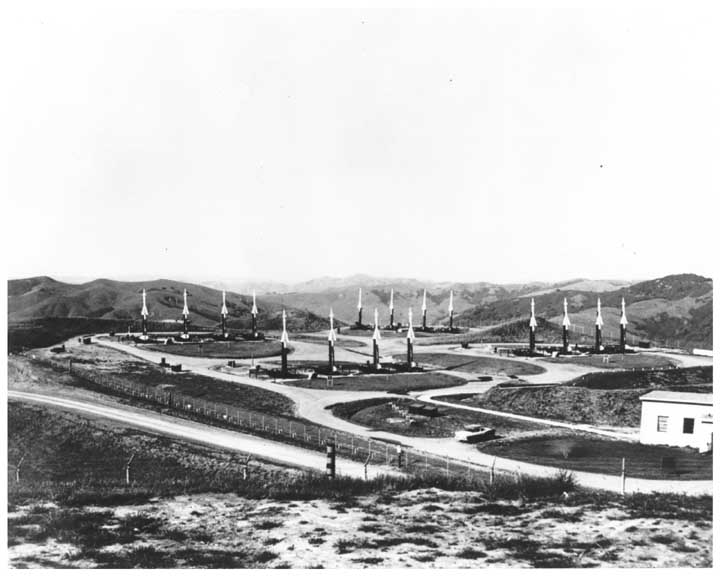
This Nike Ajax site is on full alert, with missiles ready for launch on all sixteen launch sites. This image appears to be taken from the control area (IFC) which was separated from the launch area to allow its radars to see the missiles as they launched.

As the missile batteries were now protected and accidental explosions would be contained, the safe area was dramatically reduced, and that cut the land requirement down to 40 acres (16 ha). This was the system tested at White Sands in 1953 and with its success, on 28 October 1953 ARAACOM directed that most deployments would use this option. The system used a basic building block with four above-ground launching stations over an underground battery with additional missiles. Missiles were raised to the surface on an elevator and then pushed, by hand, along rails to their launchers. Stations normally consisted of four to six of these basic building blocks.

The first site to build their Nike I system was Fort Meade, which started receiving their missiles in December 1953, replacing their 120 mm M1 guns. This site reached initial operational status in March 1954, and went on full round-the-clock combat status on 30 May. The Army considers 30 May to be the "birth date" of the Nike system. On 15 November 1956 the missile was officially renamed as the Nike Ajax, as part of DA Circular 700–22.

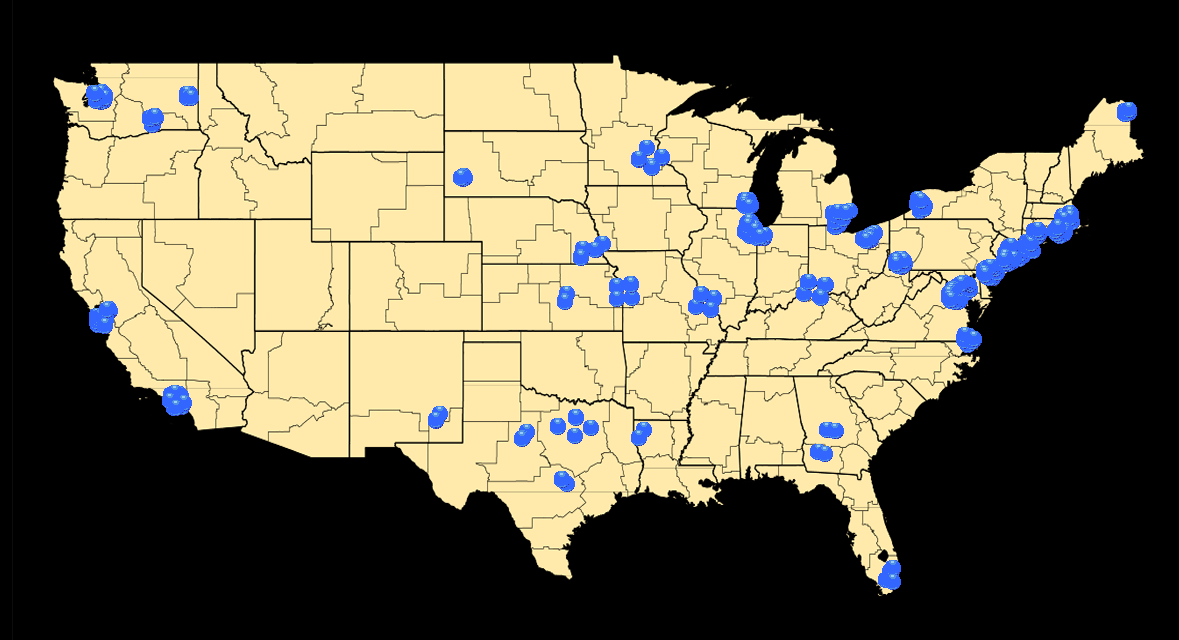
Nike bases were arranged around major cities and military sites.

Over the next four years, 265 batteries were constructed around the majority of major northern and coastal cities. They replaced 896 radar-guided anti-aircraft guns, leaving only a handful of 75 mm Skysweeper emplacements as the only anti-aircraft artillery remaining in use by the US. All of the Skysweepers were removed from service by 1960.

Several Nike Ajax missiles exploded accidentally at a battery in Leonardo, New Jersey on 22 May 1958, killing 6 soldiers and 4 civilians. A memorial can be found at Fort Hancock in the Sandy Hook Unit of the Gateway National Recreation Area.

=== After Ajax ===
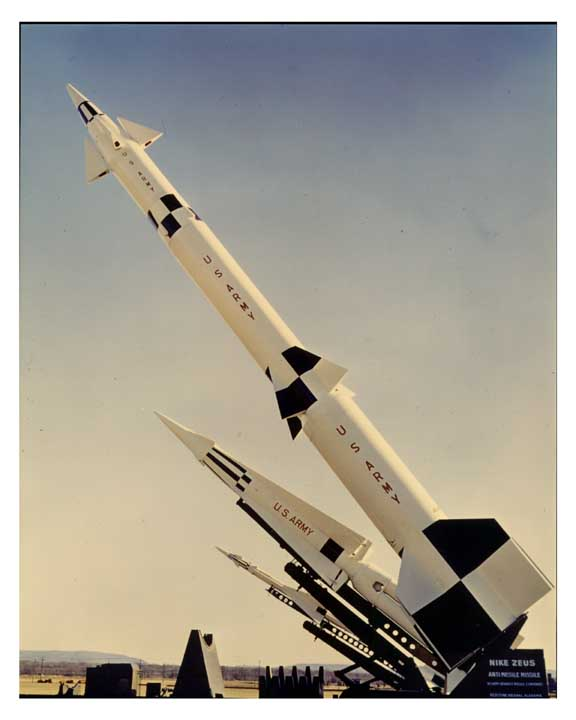
The Nike missile family, with the Zeus B in front of the Hercules and Ajax.

As early as April 1952, planners expressed concerns over the Ajax's ability to pick out targets in a packed formation. The Nike radar would see several nearby targets as a single larger one, unable to resolve the individual aircraft. The warhead's lethal range was smaller than the resolution, so it might not approach any one of the aircraft close enough to damage it. This led to suggestions about equipping the Nike with a nuclear warhead, which would be able to attack the entire formation with a single round. Bell was asked to study this in May, and they considered two options; one using the WX-9 warhead on the existing missile, which they called "Nike Ajax", while a slightly enlarged missile with the XW-7 warhead was known as "Nike Hercules". The Army selected the Hercules option, ordering it into development in December 1952. At the time, the missiles were officially known as Nike I and Nike B. As part of DA Circular 700–22, Nike I officially became Nike Ajax and Nike B became Nike Hercules.

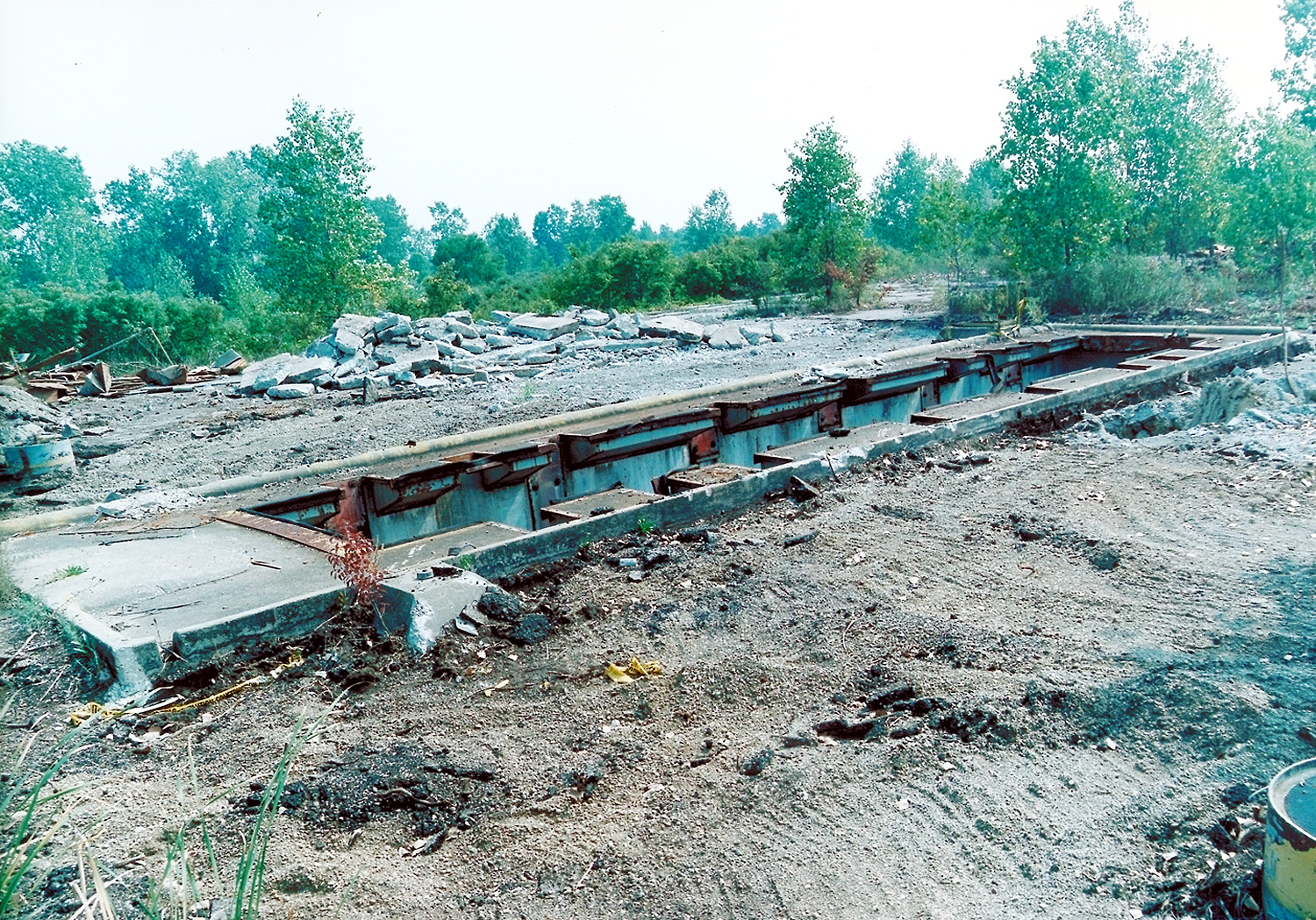
Nike site D-57/58 was used for both Ajax and Hercules until 1974, and is now in an advanced state of decay.

The nuclear-armed Nike B was originally going to be a slightly larger Nike I, just wide enough to carry the new warhead. But during early development, the decision was made to move to a solid fuel upper stage. This required a larger fuselage and was heavier as well. In order to get the new missile into the air, the booster engine was replaced with a new design using four of the original boosters strapped together. The new missile offered interception altitudes well above 100,000 feet (30 km) and ranges on the order of 75 miles (121 km). A new long-range search radar was introduced, the HIPAR, but the original AQU radar was retained as well, now known as LOPAR. (Note: Although none of the references state the reason for keeping the AQU radar, it appears this was in order to avoid having to upgrade certain displays in the control centers.) The tracking radars were also upgraded to higher power. But with those exceptions, Hercules was operationally similar to Ajax, and designed to operate at existing Ajax sites, using their launchers and underground facilities.

Conversion from Ajax to Hercules began in June 1958. Initially, the Hercules was deployed at new bases, providing coverage over existing Ajax areas. But plans had been made to convert existing Ajax sites to Hercules where possible, or close the Ajax base where it was not. As the Hercules had over double the range of the Ajax, fewer sites were needed to provide the same coverage. A total of 134 Hercules bases were commissioned, down from Ajax's 240. The last US Ajax site, outside Norfolk, Virginia, closed in November 1963. Ajax remained in active service in overseas locations for some time. The Japan Self-Defense Forces operated theirs until they were replaced by the Hercules-based Nike J in the 1970s.

As the original Bell Nike team worked on Hercules, the nature of the strategic threat was changing. By the late 1950s the concern was the ICBM and little interest in the threat of bombers remained. Even before Hercules deployed, Bell was once again asked to consider the new threat. They concluded that the Nike B (Hercules) could be adapted into an anti-ballistic missile with relatively few changes to the missile. The role would require considerably greater upgrades to the radars and computers instead. These efforts gave rise to the Nike II project in 1958, soon known as LIM-49 Nike Zeus.

Unlike the earlier Nike efforts, the Zeus would never reach operational status. Like the Ajax and Hercules, Zeus could only attack a single target at a time, although by deploying multiple radars it was expected that up to six missiles could be guided at once. This was fine when the threat was a few dozen enemy ICBMs, but as it became clear that the Soviets were placing almost all of their effort into ICBMs, Zeus looked increasingly unable to deal with the hundreds of targets that would result. Serious technical problems also arose, including electromagnetic pulse and similar effects that blocked radar, questions about the missile's ability to damage enemy warheads, and above all, rapidly rising costs. Development was canceled in January 1963.

=== Nike boosters ===
A Nike Ajax missile at the Belgian Royal Museum of the Armed Forces and Military History in Brussels.

As Ajax missiles were removed from service, thousands of unused booster rockets were left over from the program, and more when the Hercules was removed from service years later. These proved perfect for all sorts of roles, notably as the boosters for various sounding rockets. These designs often, but not always, included "Nike" in their name. Examples include the Nike-Cajun, Nike-Apache, Nike-Smoke and many others.

== Description ==
A complete Nike Ajax system consisted of several radars, computers, missiles, and their launchers. Sites were generally arranged in three major sections, the administration area, area A, the magazine and launcher area with the missiles, L, and the Integrated Fire Control area with the radar and operations center, or IFC. Most sites placed the A and IFC on one parcel of land with the L on another, but some sites used three entirely separate areas. The IFC was located between 1,000 yards and a mile from the launchers, but had to be within the line-of-sight so the radars could see the missiles as they launched.

The launch area normally consisted of two or three underground facilities and their aboveground launchers. Sites with four to six launchers were not unknown. A single launcher site normally held twelve missiles, eight in the service area and four in the underground ready area or on their launchers. When an alert was received, the missiles were transferred to the surface one at a time using an elevator, then pushed along rails on the surface leading to the launchers. The launchers bisected the rails, so the missiles were simply pushed over the launchers, connected to the electrical hookups, and then raised to about 85 degrees by the launchers. The missile launch area also contained a separate fueling area surrounded by a large berm, a required safety precaution given the hypergolic fuels, and a variety of service areas.

Long distance surveillance was handled by the ACQ or LOPAR radar, short for "Low-Power Acquisition Radar." LOPAR included an IFF system and a system for handing off targets to the tracking radars. Two monopulse tracking radars were used, the Target Tracking Radar (TTR) to track the target handed off by the LOPAR, and the Missile Tracking Radar (MTR) to track the missile as it flew toward the target.

Launch of the missile was accomplished by lighting the solid fuel booster, which provided 59,000 lbf (260 kN) of thrust for three seconds. The booster pushed the missile through the sound barrier, and it remained supersonic for the rest of its flight. The MTR picked up the missile as the booster fell away, and then tracked it continually after that point. Data from the TTR and MTR were sent to the analog tracking computer, which continually calculated the impact point and sent radio commands to the missile to guide it. In order to maximize range, the missile was normally flown almost vertically to a higher altitude than the target, where the thinner air lowered drag and allowed the missile to descend on its target. At the correct time, the missile's three warheads were triggered by a signal from the computer. The warheads were surrounded by metal cubes providing a blast-fragmentation effect.

The Nike Ajax system could attack only one target at a time, a problem it shared with its descendants. As the various Ajax missile sites were overlapped, this led to the possibility that two sites might attack one target while another flew past both. ARADCOM initially set up a coordination system not unlike the Royal Air Force's plotting room from the Battle of Britain, with commands from a central manual plotting room being sent to batteries over telephone lines. This was clearly inadequate, and in the late 1950s the Interim Battery Data Link was introduced to share data between batteries. This allowed command to be devolved to the battery commanders, who could see which targets other batteries were attacking. This system was further improved with the introduction of the Missile Master system, which replaced manual plotting with a computer-run system, and then the simpler and smaller Missile Mentor and BIRDIE systems.

The Nike batteries were organized in Defense Areas and placed around population centers and strategic locations such as long-range bomber and important military/naval bases, nuclear production facilities and (later) ICBM sites. The Nike sites in a Defense Area formed a circle around these cities and bases. There was no fixed number of Nike batteries in a Defense Area and the actual number of batteries varied from a low of 2 in the Barksdale AFB Defense Area to a high of 22 in the Chicago Defense Area. In the US the sites were numbered from 01 to 99 starting at the north and increasing clockwise. The numbers had no relation to actual compass headings, but generally Nike sites numbered 01 to 25 were to the northeast and east, those numbered 26 to 50 were to the southeast and south, those numbered 51 to 75 were to the southwest and west, and those numbered 76 to 99 were to the northwest and north. The Defense Areas were identified by a one- or two-letter code which were related to the city name. Thus those Nike sites starting with C were in the Chicago Defense Area, those starting with HM were in the Homestead AFB/Miami Defense Area, those starting with NY were in the New York Defense Area, and so forth. As an example Nike Site SF-88L refers to the launcher area (L) of the battery located in the northwestern part (88) of the San Francisco Defense Area (SF).

Studies throughout the Nike project considered mobile launchers, but none were developed for the Ajax system. Missile sites were "relocatable" or "transportable", and all of the support equipment was built into trailers or otherwise provided road wheels.

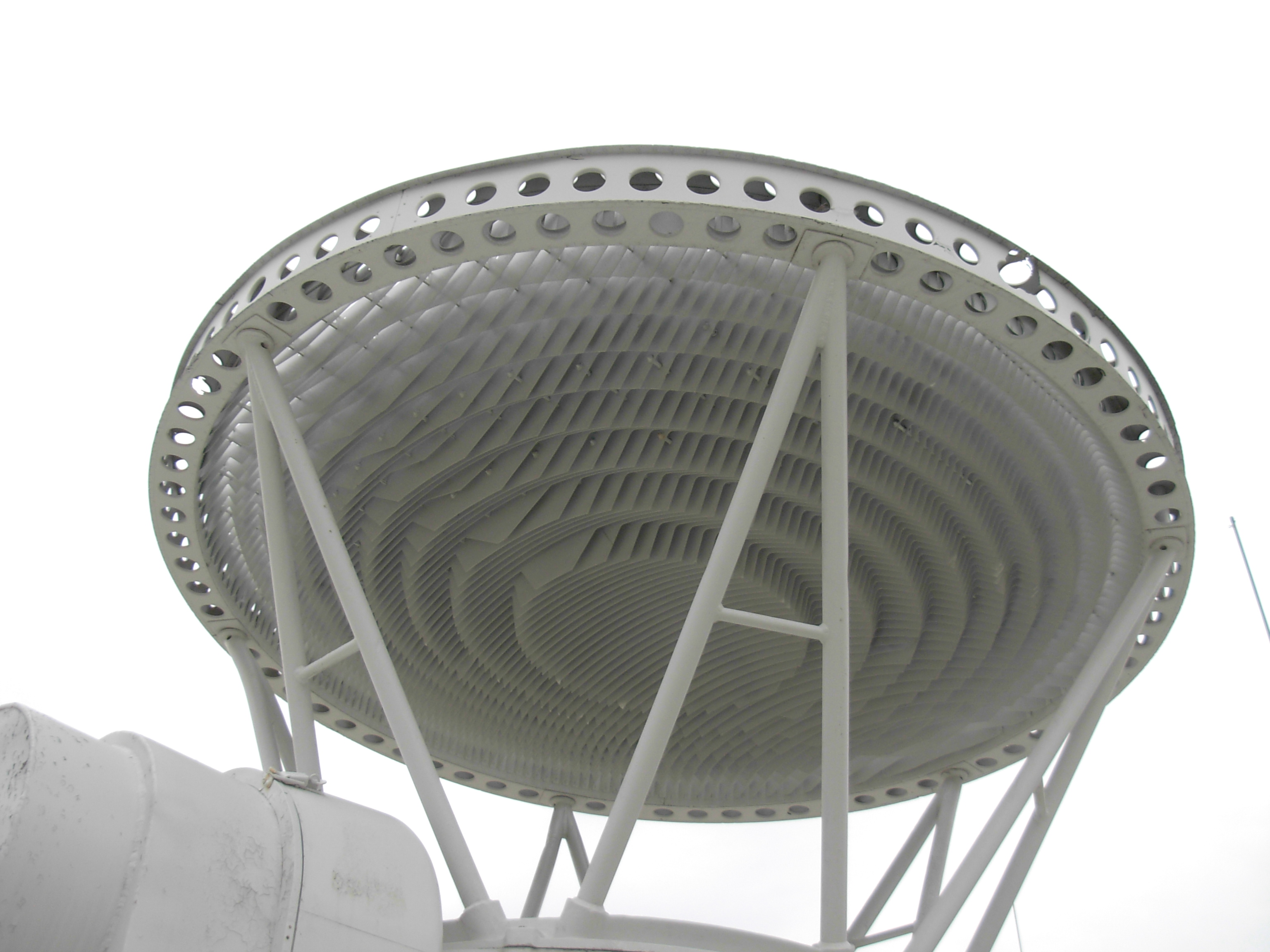
The TTR and MTR radars used a Fresnel lens made of thin metal plates arranged in a frame. The feed horn is at the bottom of the A-shaped supports.

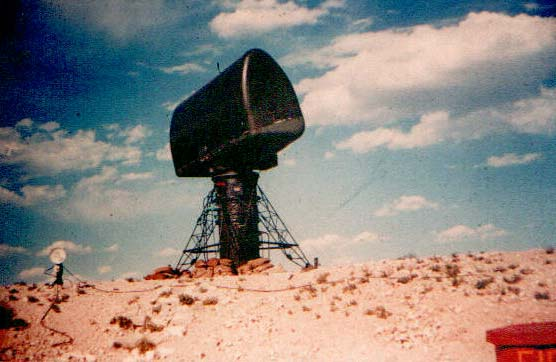
The ACQ radar was the primary search radar for the Ajax, and was also used for short-range duties with the Hercules as LOPAR.

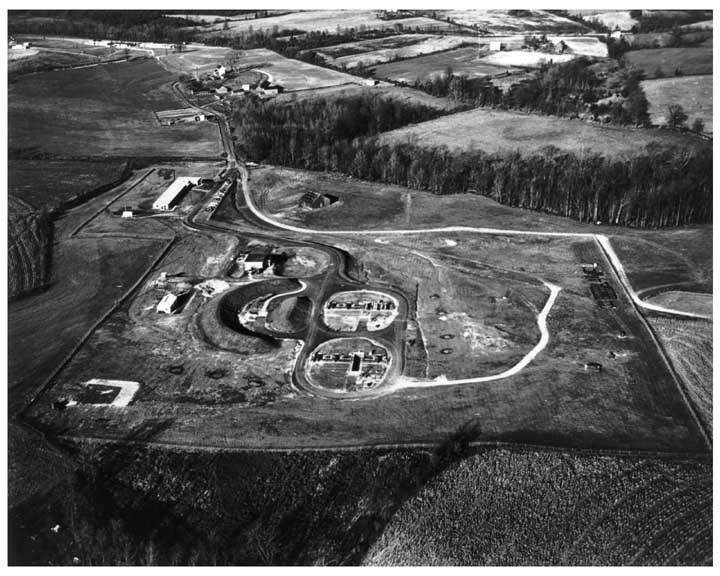
This Nike Ajax site has only two launch areas, the oval-shaped areas in the middle of the image. The rectangular openings are elevators that raise the missiles from their underground storage areas, and the four launchers are the small squares on either side. To the left of the launchers is the refueling area, surrounded by a high berm in case one of the missiles exploded.

== Accidental launches ==
- An accidental launch of a Nike-Ajax missile occurred on April 14, 1955, at the W-25 site at Fort George G. Meade which contains the National Security Agency headquarters.

== Survivors ==
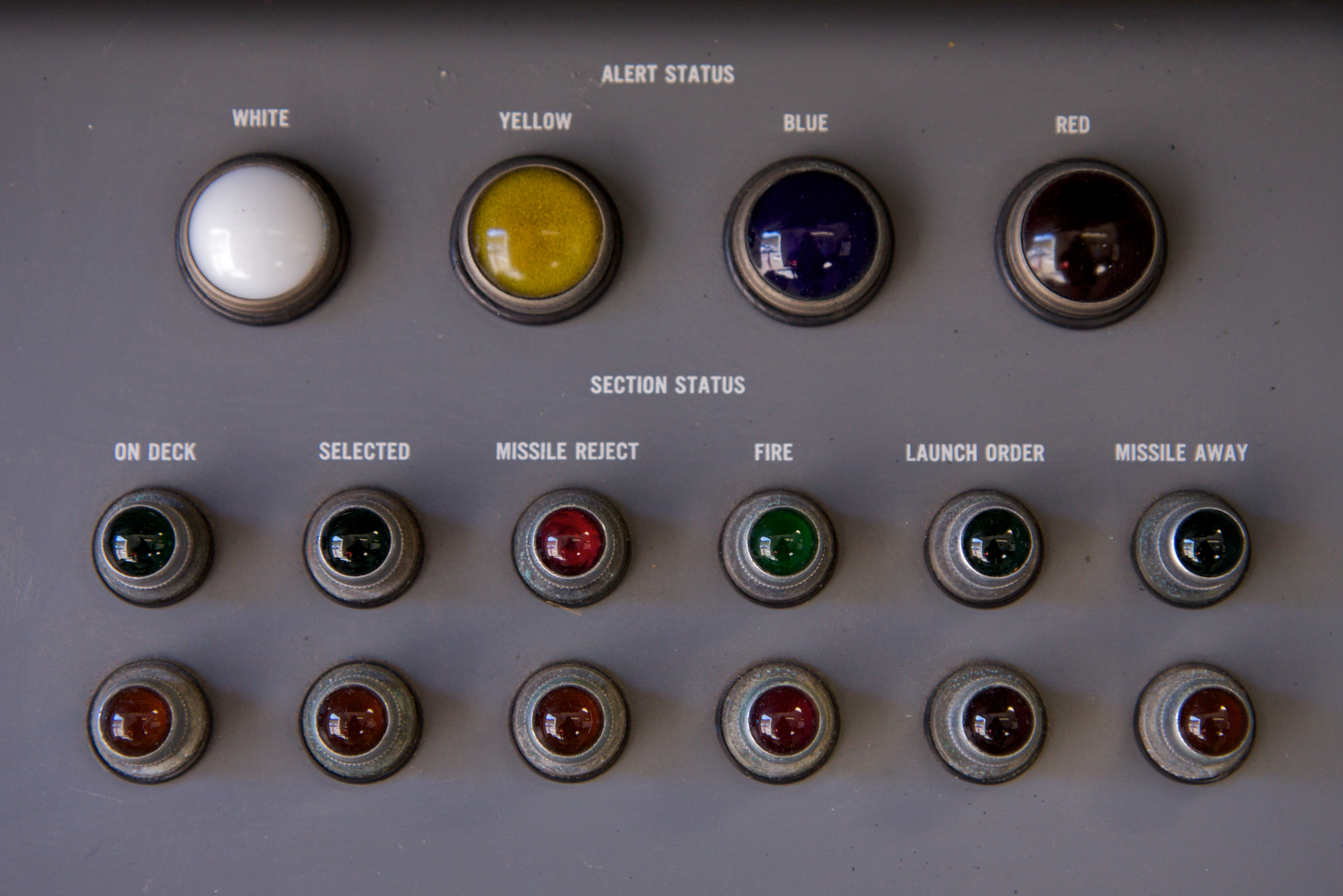
Nike site SF-88L missile status board.

=== Bases ===
- The best preserved Nike installation is site SF88L located in the Golden Gate National Recreation Area in the Marin Headlands just west of the Golden Gate Bridge in San Francisco, California. The site is a museum and contains the missile bunkers, and control area, as well as period uniforms and vehicles that would have operated at the site. The site has been preserved in the condition it was in at the time it was decommissioned in 1974. The site began as a Nike Ajax base and was later converted to Nike Hercules.
- The second best preserved Nike installation is site NY-56 at Fort Hancock in Sandy Hook, New Jersey. The site has been restored and contains the original missile bunkers, as well as three Nike Ajax and a Nike Hercules on display. The site is on the National Register of Historic Places.
- Nike-Ajax Missile Site N-75 in Carrollton, Virginia. The former Nike-Ajax missile base is now home to the Isle of Wight County Parks and Recreation Department. Many buildings still stand including the barracks, mess hall, administration and recreation building and officer/non-commissioned officer family housing. Visitors can also see the fueling area and concrete slabs that mark the location of the underground missile bunkers. The park, over 100 acres (40 hectares) in size, offers different recreational activities and features softball and soccer fields, basketball, volleyball, and tennis courts, picnic areas, nature and mountain bike trails, skate park, playgrounds, senior center and a recreation hall. In addition, there are fishing opportunities in Jones Creek.
- One unit is preserved in Eskişehir Aviation Park.
- One unit is preserved outside the north-east gate of the Glassbowl Stadium in Toledo, OH. The unit was donated in 1961 by the US Army, as a nod to the University of Toledo Rockets college sports program team name and the numerous rocketry engineers the school has produced. The rocket itself is totally inactive, however it is aimed at the correct trajectory to be launched and land at the 50 yard line of Doyt Perry Stadium in Bowling Green, OH, roughly 20mi south.

== See also ==
- English Electric Thunderbird and Bristol Bloodhound, UK counterparts
- S-25 Berkut and S-75 Dvina, Soviet counterparts to the Ajax
- List of Nike missile sites
