= TE-416 Tomahawk =

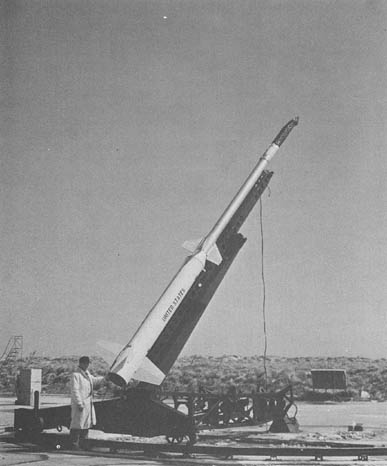
A Nike Tomahawk photographed at Wallops Flight Facility.

The TE-416 Tomahawk is a sounding rocket developed by the American company Thiokol at the beginning of the 1960s for Sandia National Laboratories. It was launched from Wallops Island, Point Mugu, Tonopah HAD4, Johnston Island and Barking Sands.

Initial flights were in the scope of the 1963 International Quiet Sun Year. In 1968 NASA used a version called D-Region Tomahawk for a single flight out of Wallops Island.

The TE-416 Tomahawk has a thrust of 9,500 lbf (42 kN) and a burn time of 9.5 seconds. The diameter of the TE-416 Tomahawk is 9 inches (23 cm) and the fin span is 36 in (91 cm).

Although the TE-416 Tomahawk can be launched alone, it was started predominantly as upper stage in connection with other rockets, for example with a Nike rocket as first stage (Nike Tomahawk).
