= Nike (rocket stage) =

American solid fuel rocket stage

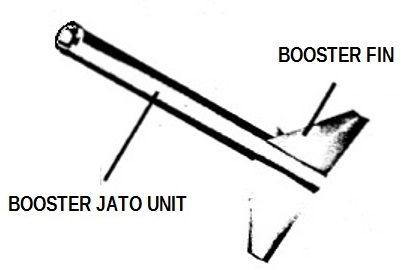
Early Booster Missile Nike I (three fin model).

The Nike stage or Nike booster, a solid fuel rocket motor, was developed by Hercules Aerospace for use as the first stage of the Nike Ajax (M5 motor) and Nike Hercules (M5E1 and M88 motor) missiles as part of Project Nike.

It was subsequently employed in a variety of missiles and multi-stage sounding rockets, becoming one of the most popular and reliable rocket stages, not only in the United States, but also in several other countries around the world.

== Sounding rockets based on Nike Booster ==
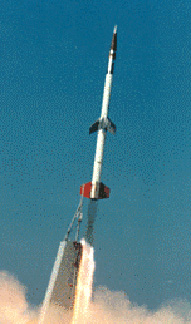
A Nike Orion rocket in flight

- The Nike Deacon has a ceiling of 189 km, a takeoff thrust of 217 kN, a takeoff weight of 710 kg, a diameter of 0.42 m and a length of 7.74 m.
- The Nike Javelin was launched 34 times between 1964 and 1978. The maximum flight altitude of the Nike Javelin was 130 km, the takeoff thrust 217 kN, takeoff weight 900 kg, 0.42 m and length 8.20 m.
- The Nike Malemute consists of a Nike starting stage and a Malemute upper stage. It has a ceiling of 500 km (310 mi), a takeoff thrust of 48,800 lbf (217 kN), a takeoff weight of 1,000 kg (2,200 lb), a diameter of 0.42 m (17 in) and a length of 8.60 metres (28 feet 3 inches).
- The Nike Orion has a Nike base stage, taken from U.S. Army surplus stocks, and an Orion upper stage. The Nike Orion is 9.01 metres (29 feet 7 inches) long. There are two stages of boosters; the first is 41.9 cm (16.5), and the second is 35.6 cm (14.0 in). It has a launch weight of 1,100 kilograms (2,400 pounds), a launch thrust of 217 kN (48,800 lbf) and a ceiling of 140 km (460,000 ft). The first Nike-Orion rocket was launched on February 26, 1977, and had more than 175 launches through the 2000s.

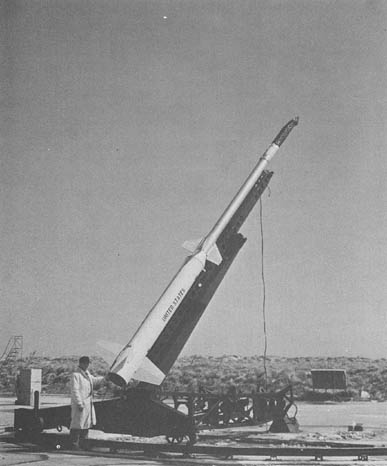
A Nike Tomahawk photographed at Wallops Flight Facility.

- The Nike Recruit has an apogee of 5 km, a liftoff thrust of 217 kN, a total mass of 1100 kg and a total length of 8.00 m.
- The Nike Tomahawk has a Nike rocket as the first stage, and a Tomahawk rocket as the second. The Nike Tomahawk has a ceiling of 230 statute miles (370 km), a payload capacity of 100 pounds (45 kg), a launch thrust of 49,000 pounds of force (217 kN), a launch weight of 2,200 pounds (1,000 kg), a diameter of 17 inches (0.43 m) and a length of 35 feet 5 inches (10.80 m). The Nike Tomahawk was launched 395 times between June 25, 1963, and November 27, 1995. One of its launches was in 1966 on the beach in Cassino, Rio Grande, Brazil.
- The Nike Viper consists of a Nike starting stage and a Viper upper stage. The Nike Viper has a ceiling of 80 km, a takeoff thrust of 217 kN (48,800 lbf), a takeoff weight of 600 kg and a length of 8.00 m.

Below is a list of sounding rockets based on Nike, Nike-Nike or Nike upper stage combinations:

Sounding rockets based on Nike
Launch Vehicle	Stage 1	Stage 2	Stage 3	Stage 4
Nike	Nike (M5-E1)	-	-	-
Nike Nike (Python)	Nike (M5-E1)	Nike (M5-E1)	-	-
Nike Nike Cajun	Nike (M5-E1)	Nike (M5-E1)	Cajun (TE-82)	-
Nike Nike Deacon	Nike (M5-E1)	Nike (M5-E1)	Deacon (X-220)	-
Nike Nike HPAG	Nike (M5-E1)	Nike (M5-E1)	HPAG	-
Nike Nike Recruit	Nike (M5-E1)	Nike (M5-E1)	Recruit (XM-19-E1)	-
Nike Nike T-40	Nike (M5-E1)	Nike (M5-E1)	T-40	-
Nike Nike T-40 T-55	Nike (M5-E1)	Nike (M5-E1)	T-40	T-55
Nike Nike Tri-Deacon T-40	Nike (M5-E1)	Nike (M5-E1)	3 × Deacon (X-220)	T-40
Nike Nike Tomahawk	Nike (M5-E1)	Nike (M5-E1)	Tomahawk (TE-M-416)	-
Nike Apache (Argo-B13)	Nike (M5-E1)	Apache (TE-307-2)	-	-
Nike Asp (ASPAN)	Nike (M5-E1)	Asp	-	-
Nike Cajun (CAN)	Nike (M5-E1)	Cajun (TE-82)	-	-
Nike Cajun Little-David	Nike (M5-E1)	Cajun (TE-82)	Little-David	-
Nike Deacon (DAN)	Nike (M5-E1)	Deacon (X-220)	-	-
Nike Double-Loki	Nike (M5-E1)	2 × Loki	-	-
Nike Genie	Nike (M5-E1)	Genie	-	-
Nike Hawk	Nike (M5-E1)	Hawk	-	-
Nike Hydac	Nike (M5-E1)	Hydac	-	-
Nike Iroquois (NIRO)	Nike (M5-E1)	Iroquois (TE-M-388)	-	-
Nike Javelin	Nike (M5-E1)	Javelin	-	-
Nike Javelin-3	Nike (M5-E1)	Javelin-3	-	-
Nike Malemute	Nike (M5-E1)	Malemute (TU-758)	-	-
Nike Orion	Nike (M5-E1)	Orion (M22E8)	-	-
Nike Improved Orion	Nike (M5-E1)	Improved Orion (M112)	-	-
Nike Recruit	Nike (M5-E1)	Recruit (XM-19-E1)	-	-
Nike T-40 T-55	Nike (M5-E1)	T-40	T-55	-
Nike Tomahawk	Nike (M5-E1)	Tomahawk (TE-M-416)	-	-
Nike Viper-1	Nike (M5-E1)	Viper-1	-	-
Nike Yardbird	Nike (M5-E1)	Yardbird (TE-289)	-	-
Astrobee-200	Nike (M5-E1)	Alcor	-	-

== See also ==
- Nike Smoke rocket
