= Ragin' Cajun (disambiguation) =

Louisiana Ragin' Cajuns is the nickname of the University of Louisiana at Lafayette athletic teams.

Ragin' Cajun may also refer to:

== People ==
- James Carville (born 1944), political consultant
- Russel L. Honoré (born 1947), U.S. Army Lieutenant General
- Doug Kershaw (born 1936), fiddler
- John LeRoux, wrestler
- Hal Martin (born 1985), racing driver
- Peter Mandelson (born 1953), politician

== Other uses ==
- Barrels O' Fun, a roller coaster at Six Flags Great Adventure, formerly known as Ragin' Cajun
- Clash of the Champions VI: Ragin' Cajun, a pay-for-view wrestling event (1989)
- Gambit (Marvel Comics), fictional character from the X-Men comics, is referred to by Wolverine as the Ragin' Cajun
- Steamin' Demon, a relocated roller coaster with the former name Ragin' Cajun
- Ragin' Cajun (film), a 1991 film featuring Charlene Tilton
- Ragin' Cajuns (TV series), a 2012 Discovery Channel series

== See also ==
- Cajun (disambiguation)
