= Terasca =

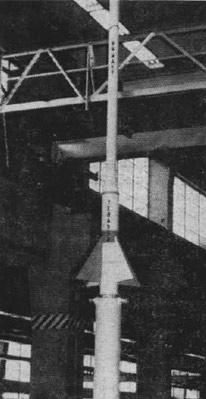
- TERASCA rocket being readied
- Function: Sounding rocket
- Manufacturer: Naval Ordnance Test Station
- Country of origin: United States

Size
- Height: 11 metres (36 ft)
- Diameter: 460 millimetres (18 in)
- Mass: 1,400 kilograms (3,000 lb)
- Stages: Three

Capacity

Payload to 158 kilometres (98 mi)
- Mass: 25 pounds (11.3 kg)

Launch history
- Status: Retired
- Launch sites: Vandenberg AFB
- Total launches: 3
- Success(es): 1
- Failure: 2
- First flight: May 1, 1959
- Last flight: August 12, 1959

Terasca, or Terrier-ASROC-Cajun, was an American three-stage sounding rocket developed and launched by the United States Navy. Derived from a combination of the Terrier, ASROC and Cajun rockets, three launches were attempted during 1959, but only one was successful.

== Design and development ==
The Terrier-ASROC-Cajun ("Terasca") rocket was developed during early 1959 by the Naval Ordnance Test Station, located at China Lake, California, to fill a U.S. Navy requirement for a three-stage sounding rocket, intended to launch experimental payloads for conducting high-altitude research. The rocket utilised a combination of existing missiles in its construction; the first stage was a Terrier surface-to-air missile; an ASROC anti-submarine rocket made up the second stage, while a Cajun sounding rocket was utilised as a third stage.

The Terrier first stage produced 58,000 lb_{f} (258 kN) thrust, while the ASROC second stage provided 11,000 lb_{f} (49 kN), and the third-stage Cajun motor had a thrust rated at 8,100 lb_{f} (36 kN). The theoretical apogee for Terasca was 98 miles (158 km); it could carry a scientific payload of up to 25 pounds (11 kg).

== Operational history ==
Three launch attempts of the Terasca missile were made from the launch facility at Vandenberg Air Force Base during 1959, utilising the Western Launch and Test Range. The first launch attempt took place on May 1; this launch was a failure. A second launch attempt on June 26, however, was successful, with the rocket reaching an apogee of 60 miles (97 km). A third launch, attempted on August 12, however, was also a failure; following the third launch, the Terasca program came to a close.

== Launch history ==
Date/Time (GMT)	Rocket	Launch site	Outcome	Remarks
1959-05-01	Terasca	Vandenberg Air Force Base	Failure	Apogee 0 kilometres (0 mi)
1959-06-26	Terasca	Vandenberg AFB	Success	Apogee 100 kilometres (62 mi)
1959-08-12	Terasca	Vandenberg AFB	Failure	Apogee 0 kilometres (0 mi)
