= Petrel (rocket) =

British sounding rocket

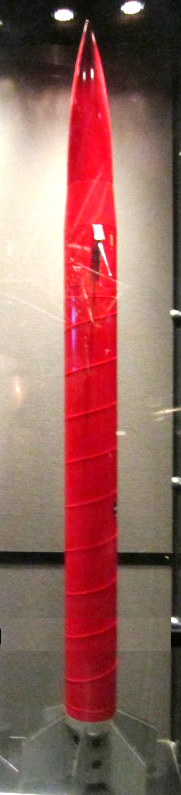
Petrel sounding rocket

The Petrel was a British sounding rocket.

It was developed by Bristol Aerojet during the mid 1960s to fulfil a requirement for an affordable sounding rocket within Britain's scientific community. Two models, known as Petrel 1 and Petrel 2, were produced, the latter using an extra booster to carry moderately heavier payloads. On 8 June 1967, the first launch of Petrel 1 took place. In excess of 200 launches were performed from a variety of sites, including South Uist, Andøya, Kiruna, Thumba, Sonmiani and Greenland. In August 1982, the Petrel programme was terminated.

== Design and development ==
The impetus for the development of the Petrel sounding rocket can be traced back to the early 1960s and the Britain's Space Research Management Unit, which, after studying options and alternates, concluded that the procurement of a new compact rocket would be the most affordable and least limiting scenario. The British National Committee for Space Research of the Royal Society also recommended the development of such a rocket to fulfil foreseeable scientific demand and that that was no suitable alternative at the forecast price. Accordingly, on July 1964, the Steering Group on Space Research approved the development of rocket. Contracts were issued by the Ministry of Aviation; the Anglo-American rocket specialist Bristol Aerojet was the prime contractor and design authority for this rocket while the Rocket Propulsion Establishment undertook development of the solid propellent rocket motor. Development was expected to take three years. During 1966, the Science Research Council (SCR) gained agreement for a production order for 28 Petrels.

The Petrel 1, akin to the Skua 1, was launched using three Chick booster rockets. These Chick motors were fitted into a booster carriage that also carried the two parachutes that deployed during the descent back to earth that permitted its re-use. The Petrel 1 was 3.34 m long, had a diameter of 19 cm and reached a maximum altitude of 140 kilometres. The rocket was stabilised via six fins located near the rear of the motor, which typically had a nominal spin rate of nine revolutions per second. The primary rocket motor could burn for roughly 30 seconds. Typically, the payload section remained attached to the motor throughout the duration of the flight. Several different telemetry apparatus were used throughout the operating life of the Petrel, including one based on pulse code modulation. The Petrel was fired from a 10-metre-long (33 ft) launch tube.

== Operational history ==
The Petrel 1 was first flown on 8 June 1967 in South Uist. A total of eight proving launches were conducted between June 1967 and March 1968, the final four of which were carrying scientific payloads. While initial flights were available to UK scientists only, after the enactment of a series of cooperative agreements, Petrel became available to the scientific community across most of Europe and the Commonwealth of Nations. Starting in May 1968, some 234 Petrels were launched from sites in South Uist, Andøya, Kiruna, Thumba, Sonmiani and Greenland. Around 2/3 of these launches took place from South Uist.

Between September and December 1973, the Petrel was the primary sounding rocket for an unusually high volume launching programme (involving five Skylarks and 12 Petrels); it involved numerous firsts, including the SCR performing co-ordinated firings of both the Skylark and Petrel rockets, as well the use of telemetry designed at the Radio and Space Research Station (RSRS), the use of a new slant ranging system, and the use of the new RSRS lidar equipment to track the sodium vapour released from in-flight rockets. To facilitate one experiment, a Petrel payload released gas clouds at apogee; the wife of one of the firing team members reported that strange lights were being seen in the night sky from Scotland.

In 1977, an improved version, the Petrel 2, with a maximum altitude of 175 kilometres was used for the first time. The Petrel was also fired from ESRANGE at Kiruna in Sweden in 1971, and from the range on Andøya, an island off the Norwegian coast in 1973. One launcher was installed at Kiruna, while two were installed on Andøya. Both could be loaded, but only one was elevated at a time. Two launchers allowed successive firings, one as an event came up and another as it decayed. The Petrel Iaunch programme ceased in August 1982.

== Versions ==
There were two versions of the Petrel rocket:

Petrel rocket versions
Version	First Stage	Second Stage	Payload (kg)	Apogee (km)	Thrust at start (kN)	Main stage thrust (kN)	Main stage burn time (s)	Weight (kg)	Diameter (m)	Length (m)
Petrel 1	3 x Chick	Lapwing	18	140	20	4.5	30	130	0.19	3.34
Petrel 2	4 x Chick	lengthened Lapwing	18	175	27	4.5	40	160	0.19	3.70

== See also ==
- Sounding rocket
- X-ray astronomy
- Skua (rocket)
