= Nike Smoke =

NASA sounding rocket

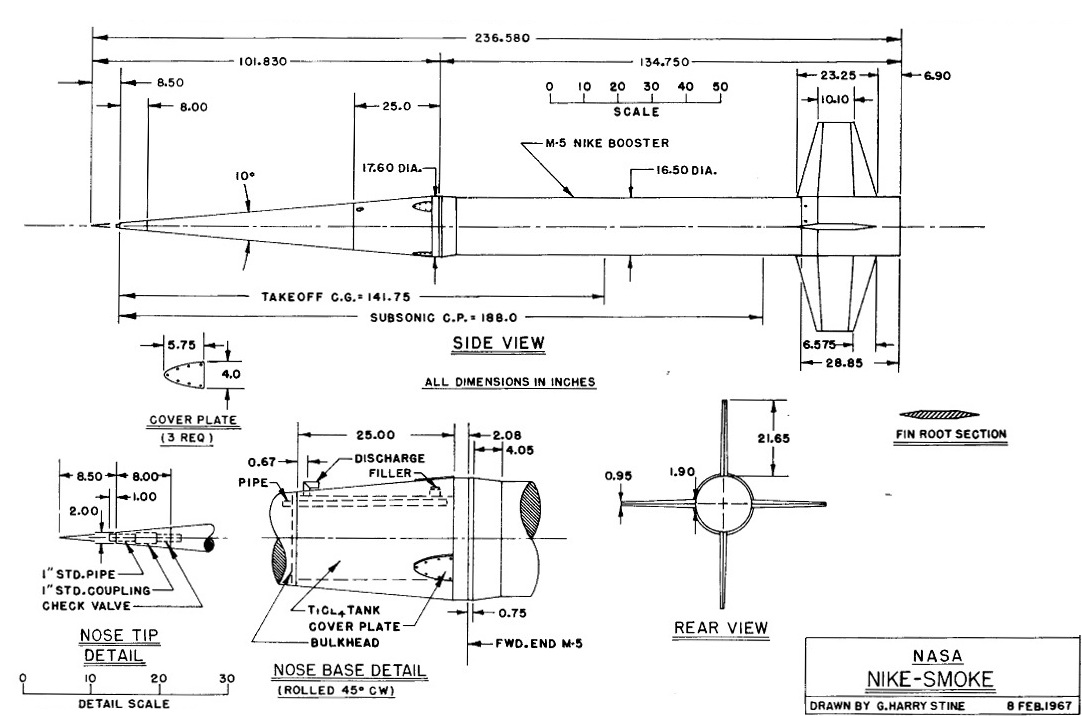
- Nike Smoke diagram
- Function: Sounding missile
- Manufacturer: NASA/Thiokol
- Country of origin: United States

Size
- Height: 6 m
- Width: 0.43 m
- Mass: 708 kg
- Stages: 1

Launch history
- Status: Retired
- Launch sites: Wallops Island, Cape Kennedy
- First flight: May 17, 1962
- Carries passengers or cargo: titanium tetrachloride

First stage
- Engines: Thiokol M5 booster
- Thrust: 217 kN
- Burn time: 3.5 seconds
- Propellant: Solid

The Nike Smoke was a sounding rocket, part of a research project on the behavior of the horizontal winds in the upper atmosphere, developed by NASA in the 1960s based on the Nike booster. The goal was to obtain more accurate data on the behavior of these winds in order to guide the design of new vehicles particularly the Saturn family of vehicles.

Nike Smoke used the release of titanium tetrachloride (TiCl_{4}) at altitude to create a smoke trail at altitude. The release created a white smoke trail which was then photographed from two cameras situated 10–12 miles from the launch site and 90 degrees apart. Comparison of the photographs allowed winds aloft to be calculated in both direction and velocity.

== Origins ==
In the early 1960s, NASA's Nike Smoke project was developed at the Langley Research Center and Marshall Space Flight Center laboratories, to study horizontal wind speed and its influence on rocket flights. The Nike booster was chosen due to its high reliability and availability, as thousands were manufactured to meet the requirements of Project Nike.

Its cone-shaped tip, with an air intake tube, a tank and an exhaust valve, was specially developed for the mission.

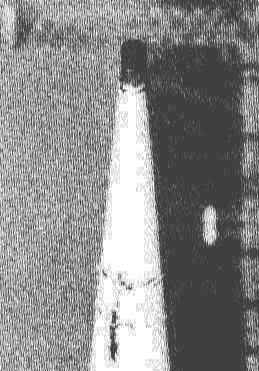
Nike Smoke rocket tip showing the inlet pipe painted in black

In the tank were placed 37 litres of titanium tetrachloride in order to produce a highly reflective and dense smoke trail, hence its name. This trail extended from an altitude of around 6,000 feet to 75,000 feet. The triangulation of this trail provided data much more precise than previous tests made with high-altitude balloons.

== Development ==
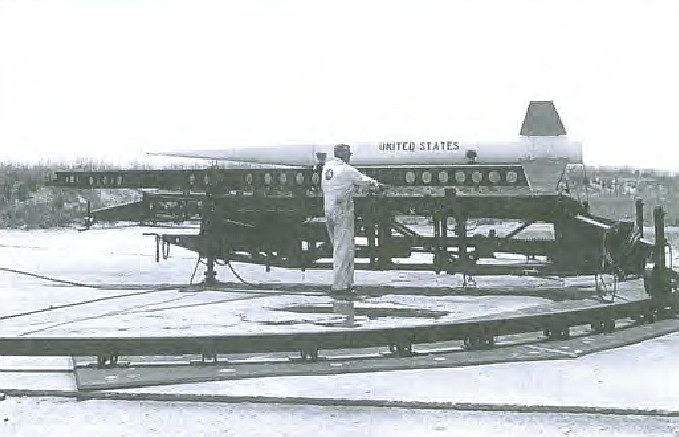
Nike Smoke test round is prepared for launch (Cape Kennedy, 1964)

It was intended to launch about a hundred rockets within a 1-year period from Cape Kennedy, where the launch site was built adjacent to Cape Canaveral Air Force Station. The first launch was successfully conducted on May 17, 1962.

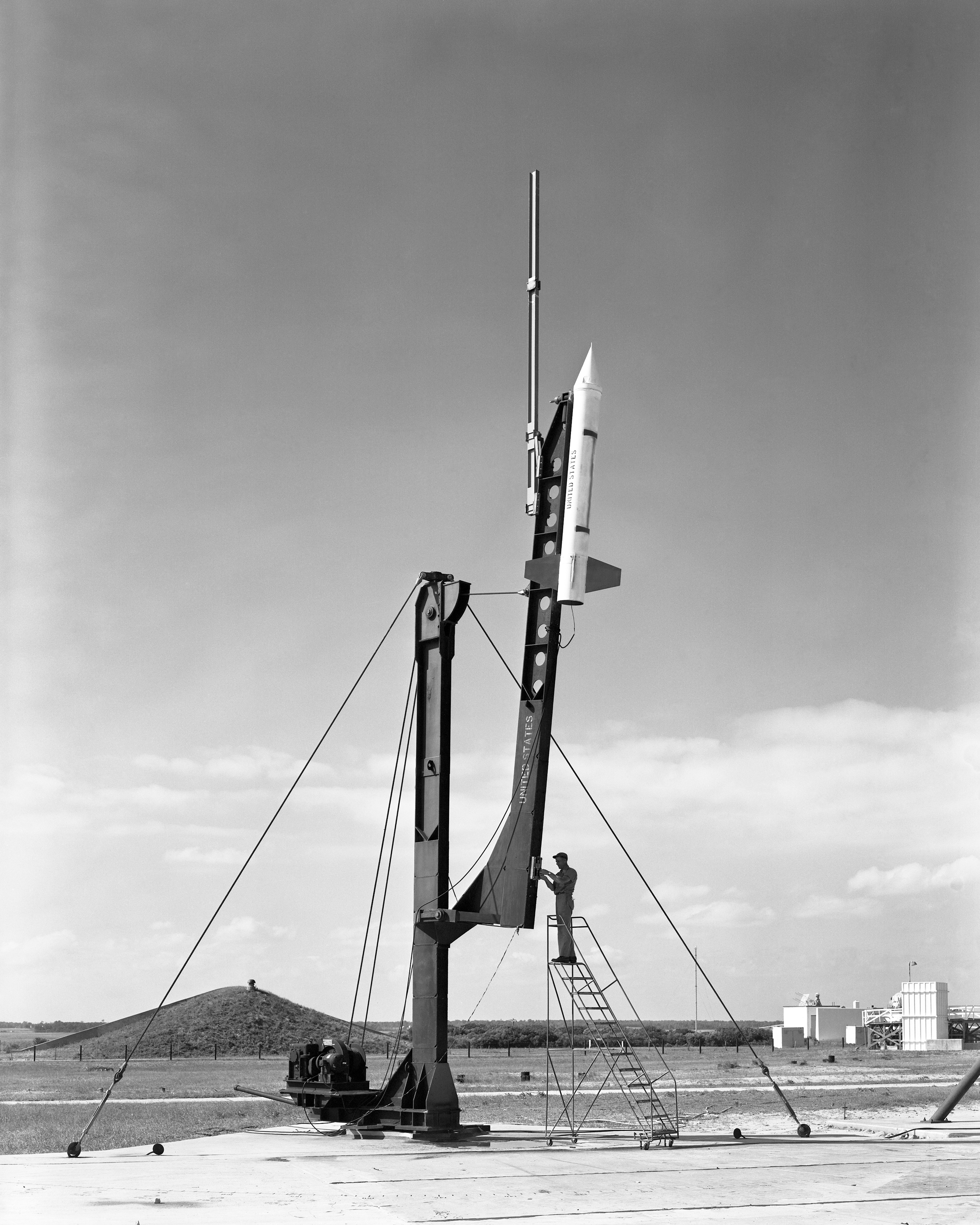
Nike Smoke and launcher (Wallops Island, 1960)

From May 1962 until May 1963, a total of 55 Nike Smokes were launched from Cape Kennedy. From July 1963 until January 1965, more than 70 Nike Smokes were launched from their Wallops Island launch site. The rocket proved to be an effective and cheap method to study wind patterns at high altitudes.

Nike Smoke continued to be used by NASA in the following years. Before each Apollo launch, a Nike Smoke was launched to allow monitoring of horizontal winds at high altitude, which could eventually even interrupt or delay a launch of that project.

The project's head was Harold Tolefson, along with his engineers Charles Dozier, Robert Henry and Robert Miller.

== Operation ==
Before this rocket studies of horizontal winds at high altitudes were carried out using research balloons, with very sparse graphic results where important variations were not recorded

Using Nike Smoke, the procedures for each launch were as follows:

1. The components were integrated and the alignment and center of gravity of the rocket in the horizontal position were checked.
2. The rocket was then taken to the launch pad and attached to the launcher rails.
3. Still in the horizontal position, approximately 37 liters of Titanium Tetrachloride were loaded into the tank inside the hood at the tip of the rocket.
4. The rocket was then positioned at an angle of almost 90 degrees to the ground, and launched.
5. From an altitude of 1,830 meters, with the Nike engine having exhausted itself, with the natural effects of the great deceleration, the liquid began to be ejected from the hood through a valve at high pressure, producing the desired reflective smoke trail up to an altitude of almost 25,000 meters
6. High-resolution photographs were taken from two cameras at different angles at six-second intervals over a five-minute period.
7. Later, using photo triangulation, plotting and data reduction techniques, detailed information on wind speed, direction and angles of attack at altitudes up to 25 km was obtained.

Once the photos were taken, they were processed in laboratories at Langley Research Center and Marshall Space Flight Center.

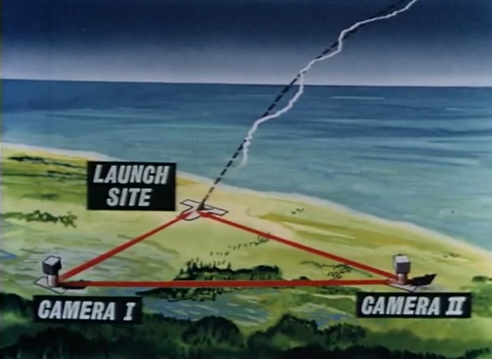
Nike Smoke trail triangulation

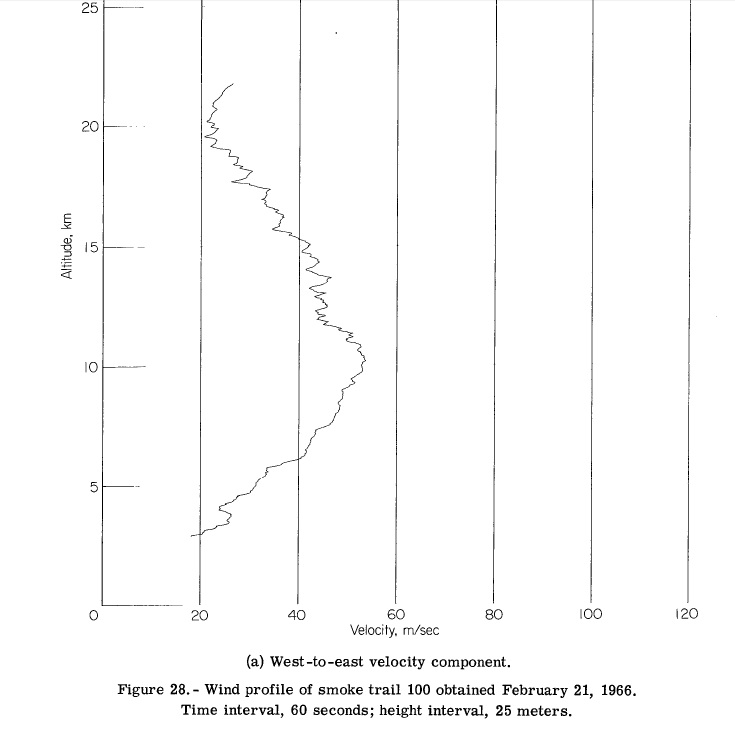
A sample page of a Nike Smoke experiment graphical data report.

The results from this type of experiment were ten times more accurate, in all respects, than those obtained from similar experiments using high-altitude balloons . The data obtained from this type of experiment could be used to compare data from different launch vehicle designs and gauge their likely behavior. This was the way in which "virtual" behavior tests were carried out at the time before creating the final product (a new rocket).

== See also ==
- Sounding rocket
