= Skua (rocket) =

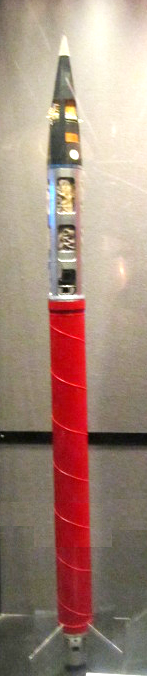
Skua sounding rocket

Skua is the designation of a British sounding rocket which was launched between 1959 and 1981 in four versions over 300 times. The Skua was developed by Bristol Aerojet and RPE Wescott.

It consisted of a starting stage made up of several Chick rockets (like the Petrel) that burned for 0.2 seconds. They propelled the rocket 20 metres over the 5-metre-long launch tube. After that, the Bantam main stage ignited. The solid rocket motor of the main stage had an end-burning propellant grain and burned for 30 seconds. The starting stage descended on parachutes and was re-filled and re-used.

The fastest jet stream velocity ever measured (656 km/h or 408 mph) was recorded by instruments on board a Skua rocket above South Uist, Outer Hebrides, Scotland at an altitude of 47,000 m (154,200 ft), on 13 December 1967.

== Versions ==
There were four versions of the Skua rocket:

Skua rocket versions
Version	First Stage	Second Stage	Payload (kg)	Apogee (km)	Thrust at start (kN)	Weight (kg)	Diameter (m)	Length (m)
Skua 1	3 x Chick	Bantam	5	70	20	58	0.13	2.21
Skua 2	4 x Chick	extended Bantam	5	100	27	68	0.13	2.42
Skua 3	4 x Chick	extended Bantam	5	120	27	75	0.13	2.80
Skua 4	4 x Chick	improved Bantam	7.5	140	27	83	0.13	2.80

== See also ==
- Sounding rocket
- Petrel (rocket)
- Arcas (rocket)
