= Nike-Cajun =

American sounding rocket

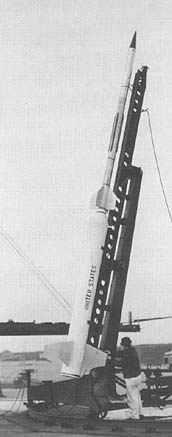
A Nike-Cajun in launch position

The Nike-Cajun was a two-stage sounding rocket built by combining a Nike base stage with a Cajun upper stage. The Nike-Cajun was known as a CAN for Cajun And Nike. The Cajun was developed from the Deacon rocket. It retained the external size, shape and configuration of the Deacon but had 36 percent greater impulse than the Deacon due to improved propellant. It was launched 714 times between 1956 and 1976 and was the most frequently used sounding rocket of the western world. The Nike Cajun had a launch weight of 698 kg (1538 lb), a payload of 23 kg (51 lb), a launch thrust of 246 kN (55,300 lbf) and a maximum altitude of 120 km (394,000 ft). It had a diameter of 42 cm (1 ft 4 1/2 in) and a length of 7.70 m (25 ft 3 in). The maximum speed of the Nike-Cajun was 6,760 km/h (1,880 m/s; 4,200 mph).

The Cajun stage of this rocket was named for the Cajun people of South Louisiana because one of the rocket's designers, J. G. Thibodaux, was a Cajun.

The Nike-Cajun configuration was also used by one variation of the MQR-13 BMTS target rocket.

Engine:

- 1st stage: Allegheny Ballistics Lab. X216A2 solid-fueled rocket; 246 kN (55,000 lb) for 3 s
- 2nd stage: Thiokol TE-82-1 Cajun solid-fueled rocket; 37 kN (8,300 lb) for 2.8 s

== See also ==
- Nike-Apache
