= Viper Dart =

Viper Dart is an American sounding rocket originally developed in 1972. Space Data Corporation (SDC) developed the vehicle as a mean to increase the apogee of the Super Loki boosted PWN-12A dart. The PWN-12A dart is the non-propulsive second stage that contains a ROBINSphere (Radar OBservable INflation Sphere). The ROBINSphere is a calibrated weight inflatable 1 meter diameter radar reflecting balloon, weighing in at about 150 grams. The weight is measured within one-half gram.

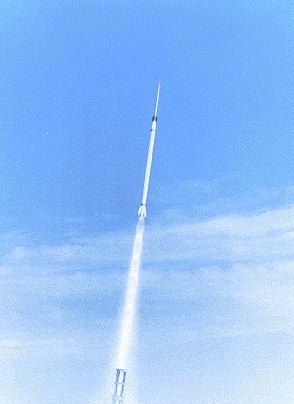
Nasa Image: Launching of a Viper Dart Rocket

The Viper IIIA boosted PWN-12A dart has a maximum apogee of 120 km (74.56 mi), a diameter of 0.11 m and a length of 3.40 m.

The Viper II version had a ceiling of 150 km, a diameter of 0.18 m and a length of 3.40 m. This vehicle configurations flew less than 100 missions as a meteorological rocket and last flew in 1988 at White Sands Missile Range, NM..
