= Nike-Apache =

Two-stage sounding rocket used by NASA

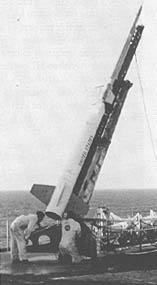
- A Nike-Apache aboard USNS Croatan
- Function: Sounding rocket
- Manufacturer: Aerolab/Atlantic Research
- Country of origin: United States
- Cost per launch: $6,000 USD

Size
- Height: 8.53 m (28.0 ft)
- Diameter: 0.42 m (1 ft 5 in)
- Mass: 727 kg (1,603 lb)
- Stages: Two

Payload to 160 km (99 mi)
- Mass: 45.4 kg (100 lb)

Launch history
- Status: Retired
- Launch sites: Multiple
- Total launches: 636
- First flight: 17 February 1961
- Last flight: 27 September 1978

First stage – Nike
- Diameter: 0.42 m (1 ft 5 in)
- Powered by: 1 x ABL M5
- Maximum thrust: 217 kN (49,000 lb_{f})
- Burn time: 3.5 s
- Propellant: solid

Second stage – Apache
- Diameter: 0.165 m (6.5 in)
- Powered by: 1 x Thiokol TE-307-2
- Maximum thrust: 21.1 kN (4,700 lb_{f})
- Burn time: 6 s
- Propellant: solid

The Nike Apache, also known as Argo B-13, was a two-stage sounding rocket developed by Aerolab, later Atlantic Research, for use by the United States Air Force and NASA. It became the standard NASA sounding rocket and was launched over 600 times between 1961 and 1978.

== Development ==
The TE-307-2 Apache rocket motor was developed by Thiokol as an improvement of its Cajun series of rockets; the Apache was similar in appearance to Cajun, but had an improved propellant that allowed for better performance. Combined with a M5 Nike rocket booster for its first stage by Aerolab, the Nike-Apache sounding rocket was capable of lifting 100 pounds (45 kg) of instruments to an apogee of 100 miles (160 km).

== Operational history ==
The first launch of Nike-Apache was conducted by the United States Air Force on 17 February 1961. Popular due to its low cost (US$6,000) and ability to be fired from many locales, 636 launches were conducted between 1961 and 1978, with the final launch of a Nike-Apache taking place in September 1978.

The Nike Apache was used to carry a variety of payloads to study a wide range of topics including radio astronomy, meteorology, aeronomy, atmospheric conditions, plasma physics, and solar physics.

NASA flew them from Brazil, Canada, India, Norway, Pakistan, Spain, Suriname, Sweden, all across the US, and off of the converted escort carrier USNS Croatan. Nike Apache was the first rocket launched by India from the TERLS (Thumba Equatorial Rocket Launching Station) of Kerala in November 1963.

The Nike-Apache configuration was also used by one variation of the U.S. Army's MQR-13 BMTS target rocket.
