= Cajun (rocket) =

American sounding rocket

- Function: Sounding rocket
- Manufacturer: NASA/Thiokol
- Country of origin: United States

Size
- Height: 2.64 metres (8.66 ft)
- Diameter: 200 millimetres (8 in)
- Mass: 75 kilograms (166 lb)
- Stages: One

Launch history
- Status: Retired
- Launch sites: Wallops Island, Churchill, Eglin AFB, others
- Total launches: 802
- Failure: 33
- First flight: June 20, 1956
- Last flight: October 6, 1976

The Cajun was an American sounding rocket developed during the 1950s. It was extensively used for scientific experiments by NASA and the United States military between 1956 and 1976.

== Development ==
Development of the Cajun sounding rocket began in early 1956 at the Pilotless Aircraft Research Division (PARD) of the National Advisory Committee for Aeronautics' - later NASA - Langley Research Center, as a development of the earlier Deacon experimental rocket. Utilising the Deacon's airframe but an improved motor that utilised new, higher-energy propellants to provide better performance, the name "Cajun" was applied to the rocket by the leader of PARD's rocket division, a native of New Orleans.

The Cajun rocket was constructed of stainless steel, with extruded Duraluminum stabilising fins. The rocket motor, developed by Thiokol, was capable of producing up to 9,600 lb_{f} (42.7 kN) thrust.

== Operational history ==
The first test launch of the Cajun rocket took place at the Wallops Island range in Virginia on June 20, 1956. The rocket proved to be as successful as expected, and was quickly put into extensive use, both on its own and as an upper stage in the Nike Cajun (or CAN, 'Cajun And Nike'), first launched on July 6, 1956; and in the Terasca three-stage rocket, first launched May 1, 1959. Several other sounding rocket configurations made use of the Cajun stage, the most extensively used being the Cajun Dart; the Bullpup-Cajun and Double Cajun rockets also utilised the stage.

In total, over eight hundred launches of the Cajun rocket in its various configurations were conducted between 1956 and October 6, 1976, when the final Cajun flight, in the Nike-Cajun configuration, was undertaken at Wallops Island.

== See also ==
- MQR-13 BMTS
