= Thumba Equatorial Rocket Launching Station =

Indian spaceport

- Launch of RH-300 Mk2 from TERLS
- Interactive map of Thumba Equatorial Rocket Launching Station
- Location: Thumba, Thiruvananthapuram, Kerala, India
- Coordinates: 8°32′34″N 76°51′32″E
- Time zone: UTC+05:30 (IST)
- Short name: TERLS
- Established: 21 November 1963; 62 years ago
- Operator: ISRO

Thumba Equatorial Rocket Launching Station (TERLS) is India's first rocket launching station and was established on 21 November 1963. Operated by ISRO, it is located in Thumba, Thiruvananthapuram, which is near the southwestern tip of mainland India, very close to Earth's magnetic equator. It is currently used by ISRO (as Vikram Sarabhai Space Centre) for launching sounding rockets.

== History ==
The first rockets were assembled in the former St Louis High School, which now houses a space museum. The local Bishop of Trivandrum, Rev. Peter Bernard Periera, along with Vincent Victor Dereere (a Belgian) and district collector Madhavan Nair were instrumental in acquiring a large parcel of land measuring 600 acres from coastal community. Periera had given away the prayer hall and bishop's room in the local church. Minister of State for External Affairs, Lakshmi N. Menon helped to smooth bureaucratic hurdles facing the project in Delhi. H. G. S. Murthy was appointed as the first Director of Thumba Equatorial Rocket Launching Station.

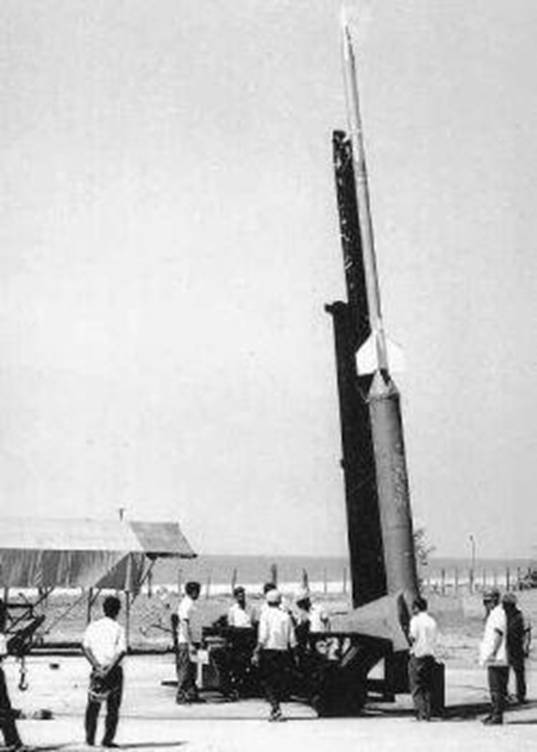
First rocket launched from TERLS being prepared. A Nike Apache in 1963.

21 November 1963 marked India's first venture into space, with the launch of a two-stage Nike Apache sounding rocket from TERLS. The first rockets launched were built in United States. The Indian navy also deputed two Bregut Alize aircraft for tracking and ranging operations during the development of sounding rockets.

The first Indian designed and built rocket, RH-75, made its maiden flight on 20 November 1967. This was the 52nd launch of a sounding rocket from TERLS. It was flown twice again in 1967 and another 12 times in 1968, making a total of 15 RH-75 flights.

Over the years VSSC has designed, developed and since 1965 started launching a family of sounding rockets under the generic name, Rohini sounding rockets to serve a range of scientific missions. The currently operational Rohini Sounding Rockets are RH-200, RH-300, RH-560 and their different versions. These sounding rockets are launched for carrying out research in areas like meteorology and upper atmospheric processes up to an altitude of about 500 km.

TERLS was formally dedicated to the United Nations on 2 February 1968, by then Prime Minister of India, Indira Gandhi. Although no direct funding from the UN was involved, scientists from several countries including United States, Russia (former USSR), France, Japan, Germany and UK continue to utilize the TERLS facility for conducting rocket based experiments.

After the death of Vikram Sarabhai on 30 December 1971, TERLS and associated space establishments at Thiruvananthapuram were renamed as the Vikram Sarabhai Space Centre in his honour.

Rockets launched from the site include RH-300, M-100, Nike Apache, Arcas, Boosted Arcas, Skua 1, Centaure, Centaure 2A, Centaure 2B, Nike Tomahawk, Dragon 1, Judi-Dart, Boosted Arcas 2, Petrel 1, RH-75, Skua 2, Sandhawk Tomahawk, Menaka II, RH-125, M-100B, M-100A, RH-200 and RH-300 Mk II.

== Launchpads ==
The site has five launchpads:

- Pad 1 at 8.533440511878172°N 76.86728897138364°E, sounding rockets
- Pad 2 at 8.53268929608746°N 76.86794175657239°E, sounding rockets
- Pad 3 at 8.530164446832044°N 76.86979707233245°E, sounding rockets
- Pad 4 at 8.529557306065989°N 76.87081759512913°E, sounding rockets
- Pad 5 at 8.531419615302084°N 76.86902030573928°E, RH-300 launch complex, active after 1993

== Location ==
Thumba's location at 8°32'34" N and 76°51'32" E is ideal for low-altitude, upper atmosphere and ionosphere studies. Thumba is a small fishing village situated close to the Thiruvananthapuram airport in Kerala.

== See also ==
- Vikram Sarabhai Space Centre
- Satish Dhawan Space Centre
- SSLV Launch Complex
- Vikram Sarabhai Space Centre
