= Paulet (sounding rocket) =

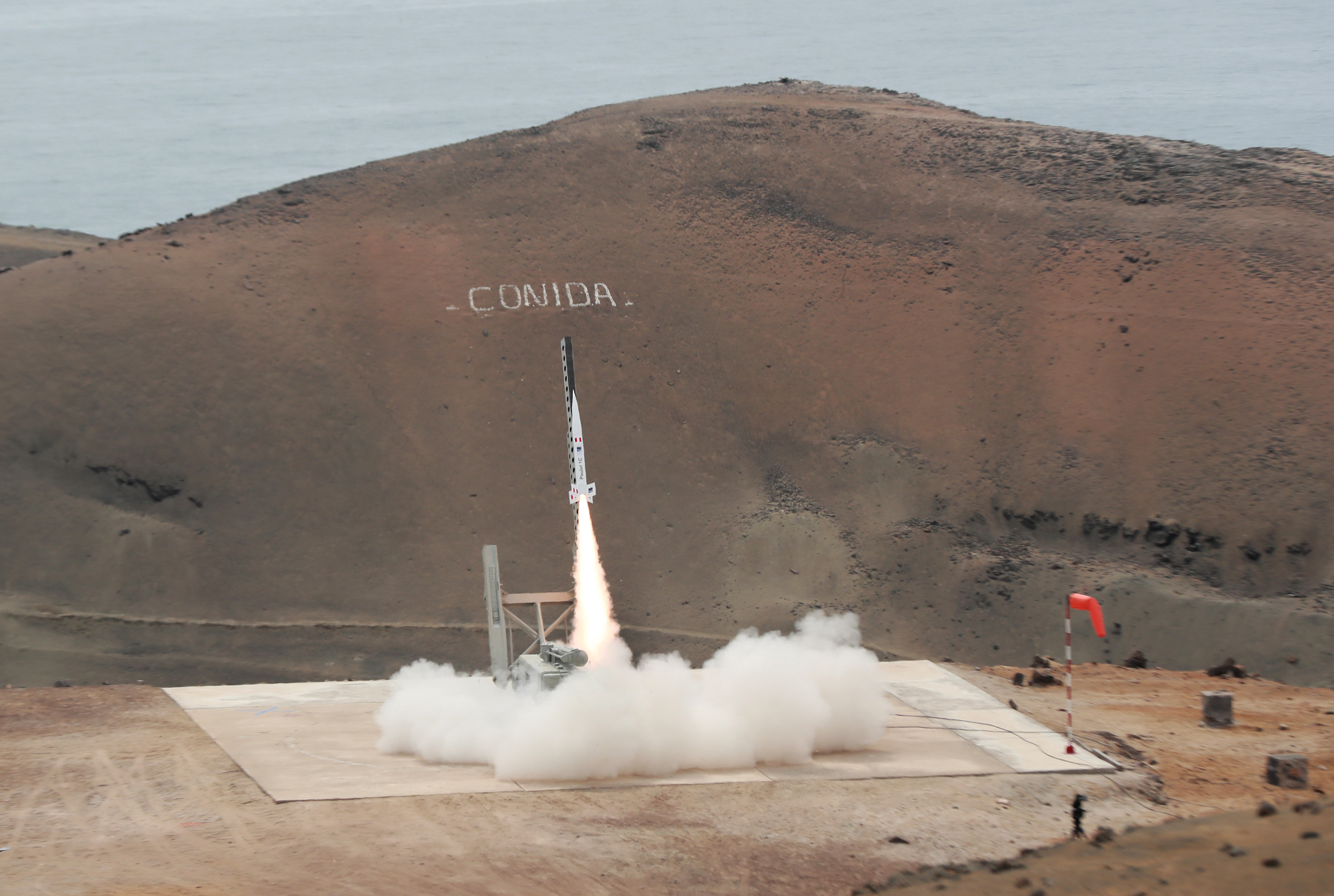
Paulet I-C launched in December 2021

The Paulet is a Peruvian-made sounding rocket whose purpose is to study atmospheric phenomena. It is named after Pedro Paulet, a Peruvian pioneer of astronautics.

== History ==
=== Paulet 1 ===
On December 26, 2006, Paulet 1 was launched from Chilca Launch Range. During its flight, it reached the supersonic speed of Mach 5 and an apogee of 45 km (28 mi), before crashing into the ocean.

==== Technical specifications ====
Paulet 1 has the following specifications:

- Length: 2.73 m (8 ft 11 in)
- Diameter: 0.206 m (8.1 in)
- Fuel weight: 64 kg (141 lb)
- Total weight: 99 kg (218 lb)
- Payload: 5 kg (11 lb)
- Range: 100 km (62 mi)

=== Paulet 1-B ===
Paulet 1 was followed by the launch of the Paulet 1-B sounding rocket on the 39th anniversary of CONIDA's foundation, June 11, 2013. The launcher was developed by scientists from the National Commission for Aerospace Research and Development (CONIDA) and the Peruvian Air Force. The rocket – made entirely of Peru's domestic equipment – entered the stratosphere, travelling just over 15 km (9.3 mi) above Peruvian territory. The successful launch encouraged Institutional Head General Mario Pimentel Higueras to state that "By the year 2020 we will have the possibility of reaching 300 kilometers in height, which will put us one step away from placing Peruvian satellites in the space with 100% national technology".

=== Paulet 1-C ===
In December 22, 2021, Paulet 1-C was launched with the purpose of checking the behavior of the fuel produced for the rocket at the CONIDA solid propellant plant; validating the aerodynamic model used to calculate the trajectory based on flight telemetry, and obtaining information on the conditions of acceleration, pressure, temperature, and speed to which the payload is subjected during flight.

==== Technical specifications ====
Paulet 1-C has the following specifications:

- Length: 2.471 m (8 ft 1.3 in)
- Diameter: 0.206 m (8.1 in)
- Total weight: 82.576 kg (182.05 lb)
- Payload: 8.408 kg (18.54 lb)
- Empennage: 0.680 m (2 ft 2.8 in)

== See also ==
- Pedro Paulet – Peruvian rocket propulsion pioneer
- Chilca Launch Range
