= Chilca Launch Range =

Rocket launch site in Peru

Chilca
- Peru

Site information
- Type: rocket launch site

Location
- Location in Peru
- Coordinates: 12°30′S 76°48′W

Site history
- Built: 1974

Chilca (Punta Lobos) is a rocket launch site in Peru at 12°30′S 76°48′W, near the town of Chilca in the municipality of Pucusana, about 70 km south of the center of Lima.

Chilca was in service from 1974 and was mainly used for launching Arcas and Nike sounding rockets.

The Peruvian Paulet sounding rocket has been launching from here since 2006.

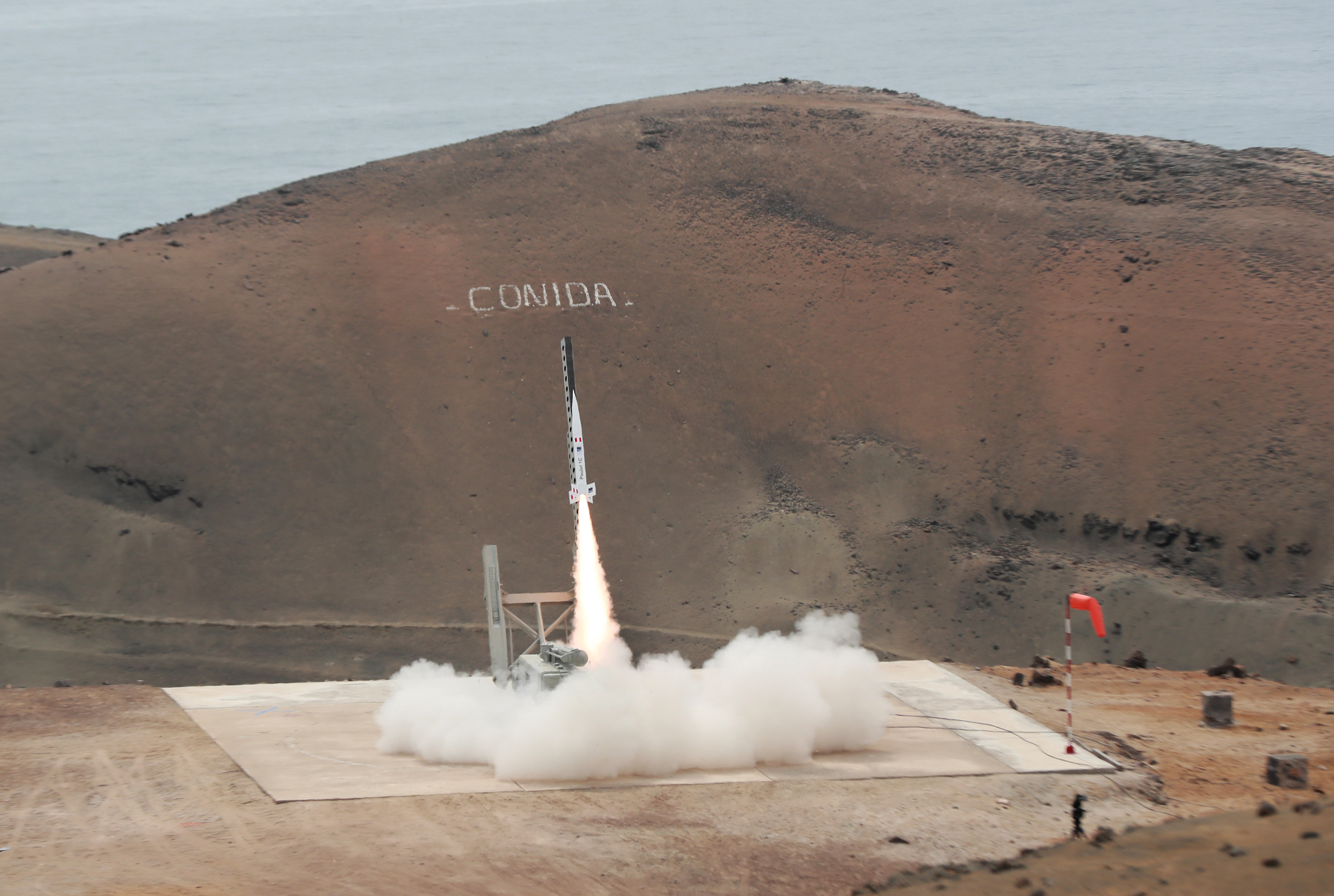
Paulet I-C launched from Punta Lobos in December 2021

In 2015 the Centro Nacional de Operaciones de Imágenes Satelitales (CNOIS) opened near the site.

== Launches ==
The Chilca / Punta Lobos launch site is in use since 1974:

| Date, Time (UTC) | Vehicle | Entity | Apogee (km) |
|---|---|---|---|
| March 29, 1974, 02:00 | Black Brant 4B | Aerospace Corporation | 742 |
| May 24, 1974, 01:00 | Nike Tomahawk NASA 18.170GE | NASA | 338 |
| May 24, 1974, 01:05 | Super Arcas NASA 15.139UE | NASA | 93 |
| May 24, 1974, 01:52 | Super Arcas NASA 15.133GM | NASA | 71 |
| May 24, 1974, 06:55 | Nike Tomahawk NASA 18.171GE | NASA | 324 |
| May 24, 1974, 07:05 | Super Arcas NASA 15.140UE | NASA | 91 |
| May 24, 1974, 07:44 | Super Arcas NASA 15.134GM | NASA | 88 |
| May 24, 1974, 08:42 | Super Arcas NASA 15.135GM | NASA | 67 |
| May 24, 1974, 2:24 p.m. | Super Loki G 1-7743 | NASA | 70 |
| May 24, 1974, 19:00 | Super Loki G 1-7742 | NASA | 70 |
| May 25, 1974, 19:44 | Super Loki G 1-7744 | NASA | 69 |
| May 27, 1974, ? | Nike Apache NASA 14.531UA | NASA | 127 |
| May 27, 1974, 08:01 | Nike Apache NASA 14.530UA | NASA | 127 |
| May 28, 1974, 19:30 | Super Arcas NASA 15.142UE | NASA | 86 |
| May 28, 1974, 20:26 | Nike Apache NASA 14.532UE | NASA | 191 |
| May 28, 1974, 21:16 | Super Arcas NASA 15.141UE | NASA | 82 |
| May 29, 1975, 03:55 | Nike Apache NASA 14.538UA | NASA | 131 |
| May 30, 1975, 04:35 | Nike Apache NASA 14.524UE | NASA | 187 |
| June 2, 1975, 05:11 | Nike Apache NASA 14.525UE | NASA | 187 |
| June 3, 1975, 16:14 | Nike Tomahawk NASA 18.149GE | NASA | 20 (failure) |
| June 3, 1975, 16:41 | Nike Apache NASA 14.540CA | NASA | 204 |
| June 7, 1975, 16:07 | Nike Tomahawk | NASA | 259 |
| June 7, 1975, 16:25 | Nike Apache | NASA | 197 |
| March 21, 1979, 11:49 p.m. | Castor (A) | DFVLR | 0 (failure) |
| March 22, 1979, 11:53 p.m. | Castor (A) | DFVLR | 268 |
| Oct. 23, 1979, 11:04 p.m. | Nike Nike GL A45.803-1 | US Air Force Geophysics Laboratory | 50 |
| October 24, 1979, 11:24 p.m. | Nike Nike GL A45.803-2 | US Air Force Geophysics Laboratory | 50 |
| Oct. 29, 1979, 11:04 p.m. | Nike Nike GL A45.803-3 | US Air Force Geophysics Laboratory | 50 |
| February 27, 1983, 16:33 | Nike Orion NASA 31.28UE | NASA | 140 |
| March 2, 1983, 02:51 | Terrier Malemute NASA 29.20UE | NASA | 590 |
| March 3, 1983, 03:54 | Taurus Orion NASA 33.26UE | NASA | 200 |
| March 8, 1983, 15:15 | Super Loki TU1-0380 | NASA | 82 |
| March 8, 1983, 16:35 | Nike Orion NASA 31.26GE | NASA | 140 |
| March 8, 1983, 17:16 | Super Arcas NASA 15.218UE | NASA | 80 |
| March 8, 1983, 19:17 | Super Loki TU1-0388 | NASA | 65 |
| March 8, 1983, 10:00 p.m. | Super Arcas NASA 15.223UE | NASA | 80 |
| March 8, 1983, 23:27 | Super Arcas NASA 15.221UE | NASA | 80 |
| March 9, 1983, 01:00 | Super Arcas NASA 15.220UE | NASA | 80 |
| March 9, 1983, 02:25 | Super Loki TU1-0381 PWN-12A | NASA | 80 |
| March 9, 1983, 02:38 | Super Loki TU1-0358 | NASA | 88 |
| March 9, 1983, 03:06 | Nike Orion NASA 31.27GE | NASA | 140 |
| March 9, 1983, 03:27 | Nike Orion NASA 31.32GE | NASA | 140 |
| March 9, 1983, 03:52 | Super Loki TU1-0389 | NASA | 81 |
| March 9, 1983, 05:00 | Super Loki TU1-0382 | NASA | 82 |
| March 9, 1983, 05:20 | Super Loki TU1-0383 PWN-12A | NASA | 80 |
| March 9, 1983, 05:32 | Super Loki TU1-0359 | NASA | 79 |
| March 9, 1983, 05:49 | Super Loki TU1-0383 PWN-12A | NASA | 80 |
| March 9, 1983, 06:10 | Super Loki TU1-0385 | NASA | 88 |
| March 9, 1983, 07:46 | Super Loki TU1-0390 | NASA | 80 |
| March 9, 1983, 08:20 | Super Loki TU1-0386 | NASA | 88 |
| March 9, 1983, 08:57 | Nike Orion NASA 31.33GE. | NASA | 140 |
| March 9, 1983, 09:20 | Super Loki TU1-0361 | NASA | 85 |
| March 9, 1983, 10:11 | Super Arcas NASA 15.219UE | NASA | 80 |
| March 9, 1983, 12:00 | Super Arcas NASA 15.222UE | NASA | 80 |
| March 12, 1983, 3:35 p.m. | Taurus Orion NASA 33.27UE | NASA | 200 |
| March 12, 1983, 17:09 | Nike Orion NASA 31.29UE | NASA | 140 |
| March 15, 1983, 02:33 | Terrier Malemute NASA 29.19UE | NASA | 520 |
| March 21, 1983, 09:53 | Taurus Tomahawk NASA 34.10UE | NASA | 500 |
| March 23, 1983, 09:50 | Taurus Tomahawk NASA 34.09UE | NASA | 500 |
| March 23, 1983, 18:52 | Super Loki TU1-0391 | NASA | 78 |
| December 27, 2006 | Paulet I | CONIDA | 45 |
| September 2, 2009, 6:17 p.m. | Paulet IM | CONIDA | 90 |
| September 30, 2011, 7:50 p.m. | X-PAX-II | CONIDA | |
| June 12, 2013 | Paulet I-B | CONIDA | 15 |
| December 22, 2021 | Paulet I-C | CONIDA | |
