= Thumba =

- Location in Kerala, India
- Coordinates: 8°31′0″N 76°52′0″E
- Country: India
- State: Kerala
- District: Thiruvananthapuram

Government
  - Body: Trivandrum Corporation

Languages
  - Official: Malayalam, English
- Time zone: UTC+5:30 (IST)
- Vehicle registration: KL-22

Thumba is a coastal area of Thiruvananthapuram city, the capital of Kerala, India.

== Location and geography ==
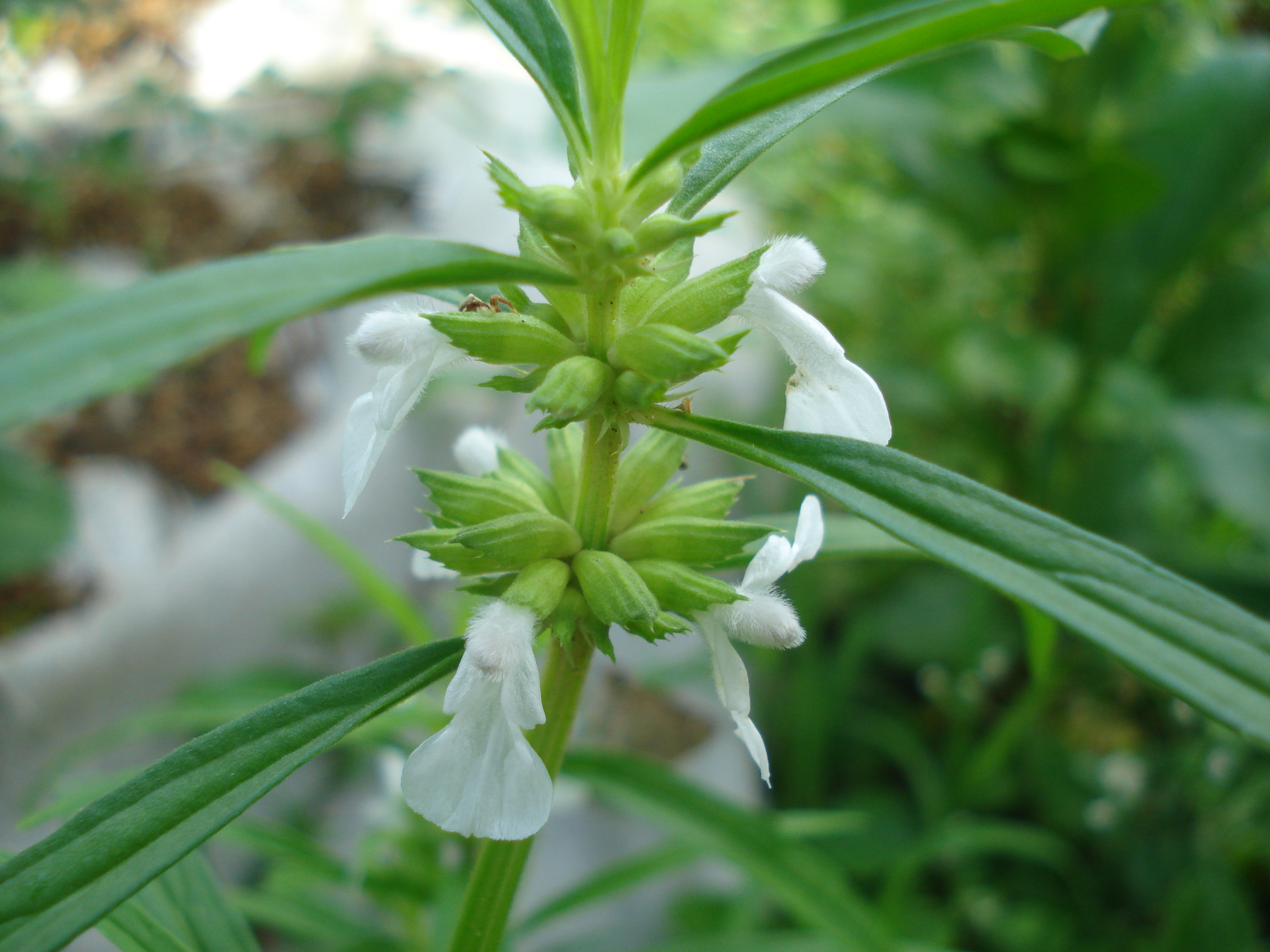
Flowering Thumba

Thumba is a vast village bordering Menamkulam in the east, St. Dominic's Vettucaud in the north, and Kochuthura in the south; towards its west is the Arabian Sea. While the border with Menamkulam is the Parvathi Puthannaar canal, the border with Kochuthura is the Rajiv Gandhi Nagar road. The entire village is flat at sea level, and the ground near to the coast is made of tan-coloured beach sand. This is in stark contrast to the rest of the village, where the ground is made of white sand, where, till the developments of the late 1990s, large amounts of a medicinal herb with white flowers called Thumba grew in abundance, hence the name. It is well connected by road and the closest railway stations are the Halt stop of Veli Railway station and the Major Junction of Kochuveli Railway station.

== Overview ==
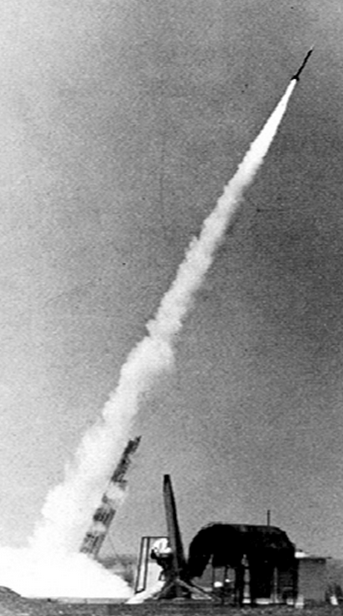
First rocket launched from Thumba Equatorial Rocket Launching Station in 1963

Thumba became well known to the outsiders after the establishment of Thumba Equatorial Rocket Launching Station (TERLS), which was the first of that kind in India. TERLS was founded in Thumba in 1962 in the district of Trivandrum on the southern tip of India very close to Earth's magnetic equator to launch sounding rockets.TERLS was dedicated to the United Nations on 2 February 1968.

Dr. H.G.S. Murthy, D Eswar Das, M R Kurup and A. P. J. Abdul Kalam, later President of India were amongst the initial team of rocket engineers. The new Vikram Sarabhai Space Center is located close to TERLS and has become one of ISRO's premiere research and development sites.

== Rocket launches ==
First rocket launch:

The first sounding rocket, Nike-Apache, was launched rocket on 21 Nov 1963. The project director for this Sodium vapor cloud experiment was Prof. P. D. Bhavsar. The Rohini Sounding Rocket (RSR) program to develop indigenously developed and fabricated sounding rockets launched the first single-stage Rohini (RH-75) rocket (32 kg rocket with 7 kg payload to ~10 km altitude) in 1967, followed by a two-stage Rohini rocket (100 kg payload to over 320 km altitude).

Other launches:

Apart from Indian payload, sounding rockets from many other countries (including United States, Russia, Japan, France, Germany) were also launched from Thumba, as part of mutual international collaboration. TERLS developed infrastructure for all aspects of rocketry, ranging from rocket design, rocket propellant, rocket motor casting, integration, payload-assembly, testing, evaluation besides building subsystems like payload housing and jettisonable nose cone. Fibre-reinforced plastic composite materials for nose cone were used in early programs at TERLS.

The rocket launch from TERLS came to a stand-still in 2000. Later in 2002, the rocket launchings were resumed from TERLS. ISRO announced their plans to launch 180 number of RH-200 rockets from TERLS over the next five years.
