= Rohini (rocket family) =

Indian sounding rockets

Advanced Technology Vehicle
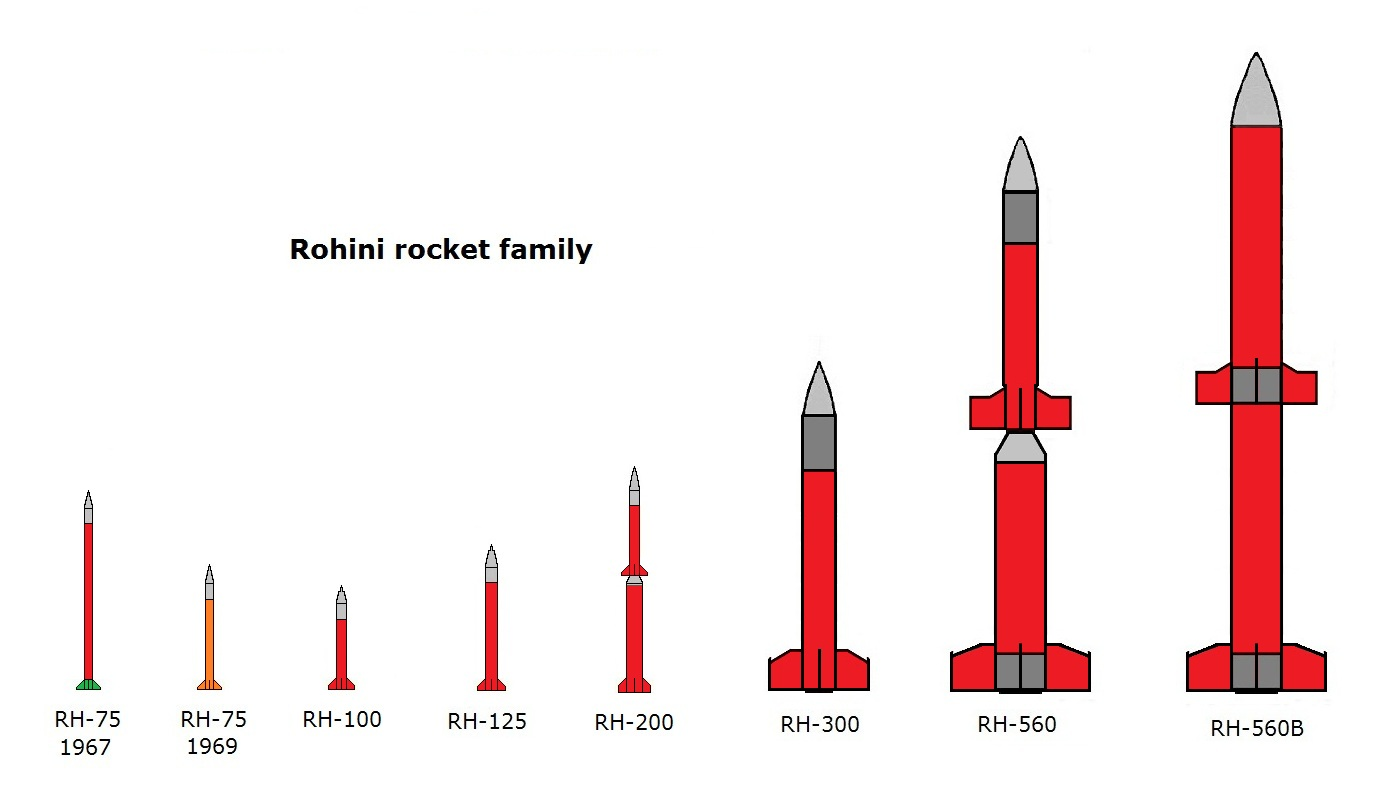
- Rohini sounding rocket family
- Function: Sounding rocket
- Manufacturer: ISRO
- Country of origin: India

Size
- Stages: 1/2

Associated rockets
- Family: Rohini Sounding Rockets

Launch history
- Status: Active
- Launch sites: Satish Dhawan Space Centre; Thumba Equatorial Rocket Launching Station

Rohini is a series of sounding rockets developed by ISRO for meteorological and atmospheric study. These sounding rockets are capable of carrying payloads of 2 to 200 kilograms (4.4 to 440.9 lb) between altitudes of 100 to 500 kilometres (62 to 311 mi). The ISRO currently uses RH-200, RH-300, Mk-II, RH-560 Mk-II and RH-560 Mk-III rockets, which are launched from the Thumba Equatorial Rocket Launching Station (TERLS) in Thumba and the Satish Dhawan Space Centre (SDSC) in Sriharikota.

Various programs such as Equatorial ElectroJet (EEJ), Leonid Meteor Shower (LMS), Indian Middle Atmosphere Programme (IMAP), Monsoon Experiment (MONEX), Middle Atmosphere Dynamics (MIDAS), and Sooryagrahan-2010 have been conducted using the Rohini sounding rocket series. It has been the forerunners for ISRO's heavier and more complex launch vehicles, with continued usage even today for atmospheric and meteorological experiment and research. Currently, three versions are offered as operational sounding rockets, which cover a payload range of 8-100 Kg and an apogee range of 80–475 km. Several scientific missions with national and international participation have been conducted using the Rohini sounding rockets.

== Brief history ==
On November 21, 1963, the American Nike-Apache was the first sounding rocket to launch from Thumba. Following that, two-stage rockets from France (Centaure) and Russia (M-100) were launched. In 1967, the Rohini RH-75, an ISRO variant, was launched. The Rohini Sounding Rocket (RSR) Programme was established in 1975 to encompass all sounding rocket operations.

== Nomenclature ==
The rockets in the series are designated with the letters RH (for "Rohini"), followed by a number corresponding to the diameter (in millimetres) of the rocket.

== Series ==
=== RH-75 ===
The RH-75, the first sounding rocket developed by India, It weighed 32 kilograms (71 lb), had a diameter of 75 millimetres (3.0 in) and flew 15 times between November 1967 and September 1968.

=== RH-100 ===
The RH-100 was a single-stage solid-fuel rocket that was capable of carrying its payload up to an altitude of 55 km or more. When paired with a 650mm long by 40mm wide copper shaft dart used for meteorological research, it was referred to as a Menaka-I rocket.

=== RH-125 ===
This rocket was launched on October 9, 1971, from Sriharikota. It was a single-stage rocket using a solid propellant, carrying a 7 kilograms (15 lb) payload to 19 kilometres (12 mi) in altitude. It flew twice between January 1970 and October 1971. It was used in testing and perfecting various techniques like staging, destruct system, separation devices and clustering. It was also used as a booster to the weather forecasting rockets. As such it was named as Menaka II which worked along with Menaka I.

=== RH-200 ===
The RH-200 is a two-stage rocket that can reach up to a maximum altitude of 80 kilometres (50 mi). Solid motors power the first and second stages of the RH-200. A polyvinyl chloride (PVC)-based propellant had previously been employed with the RH-200 rocket. In September 2020, a new propellant based on hydroxyl-terminated polybutadiene (HTPB) was successfully used to launch it from the TERLS.

=== RH-300 ===
The RH-300 is a single stage sounding rocket, derived from French Belier rocket engine technology. It has a launch altitude of 100 km (62 mi). A variant, the RH-300 Mk-II, has a maximum launch altitude of 116 kilometres (72 mi). It has ability to lift a payload up to 80 kilograms (20 kg of scientific payload) having volume measuring 380*500 mm in diameter. It is capable of reaching very high acceleration (20 G to M6). Numerous payloads can be tested in a single flight.

=== RH-560 ===
This two stage vehicle is derived from French Stromboli engine technology. Another variant, the RH-560 Mk-II, can reach a maximum launch altitude of 548 kilometres (341 mi). The RH-560 Mk-III variant's maiden flight (the flight was successful) was 12 March 2021. It achieved an apogee of 511.73 kms against the pre-flight prediction of 476 kms. The payloads were Electron and Neutral Wind Probe (ENWi), Langmuir Probe (LP) and Tri Methyl Aluminium (TMA).

=== Air-breathing propulsion version ===
On 28th Aug 2015, ISRO successfully launched a modified version of RH-560, the Advanced Technology Vehicle, that added a pair of 2nd stage Scramjet engines, the air-breathing engines fired for their planned 5 seconds; a second successful test launch was performed on, July 22, 2024.

== Applications ==
The RH-200 is used for meteorological studies, the RH-300 Mk-II for Middle atmospheric studies and the RH-560 Mk-II for Upper atmospheric studies and ionospheric studies. The RH-200 was used as the rocket for the first payload launch in India made by students of VIT University in Vellore.

Rohini series of sounding rockets
Name	Gross mass	Height	Diameter	Thrust	Apogee	Stages	First Launch	Payload (kg)
RH 75	32 kg (71 lb)	1.50 m (4.90 ft)	0.075 m (0.3 inch)		10 km (6.2 mi)	1	20 November 1967	1
RH 100					55 km (34 mi)	1		
RH 125	40 kg (88 lb)	2.50 m (8.20 ft)	0.12 m (0.39 ft)	8.00 kN (1,798 lbf)	19 km (12 mi)	2	1 January 1970	7
RH 200	100 kg (220 lb)	3.60 m (11.80 ft)	0.20 m (0.65 ft)	17.00 kN (3,821 lbf)	80 km (50 mi)	2	1 January 1979	10
RH-300	300 kg (660 lb)	4.10 m (13.40 ft)	0.31 m (1.01 ft)	38.00 kN (8,542 lbf)	100 km (62 mi)	1		60
RH-300 Mk II	500 kg (1,100 lb)	5.90 m (19.30 ft)	0.31 m (1.01 ft)	39.00 kN (8,767 lbf)	116 km (72 mi)	1	8 June 1987	80
RH-560	1,300 kg (2,800 lb)	8.40 m (27.50 ft)	0.56 m (1.83 ft)	76.00 kN (17,085 lbf)	400 km (250 mi)	2	24 April 1974	
RH-560 Mk II	1,600 kg (3,530 lb)	9.10 m (29.80 ft)	0.56 m (1.83 ft)	76.00 kN (17,085 lbf)	548 km (341 mi)	2	16 August 1995	100
RH-560 Mk III					511 km (317 mi)	2	12 March 2021	
