= M-100 (rocket) =

Soviet sounding rocket

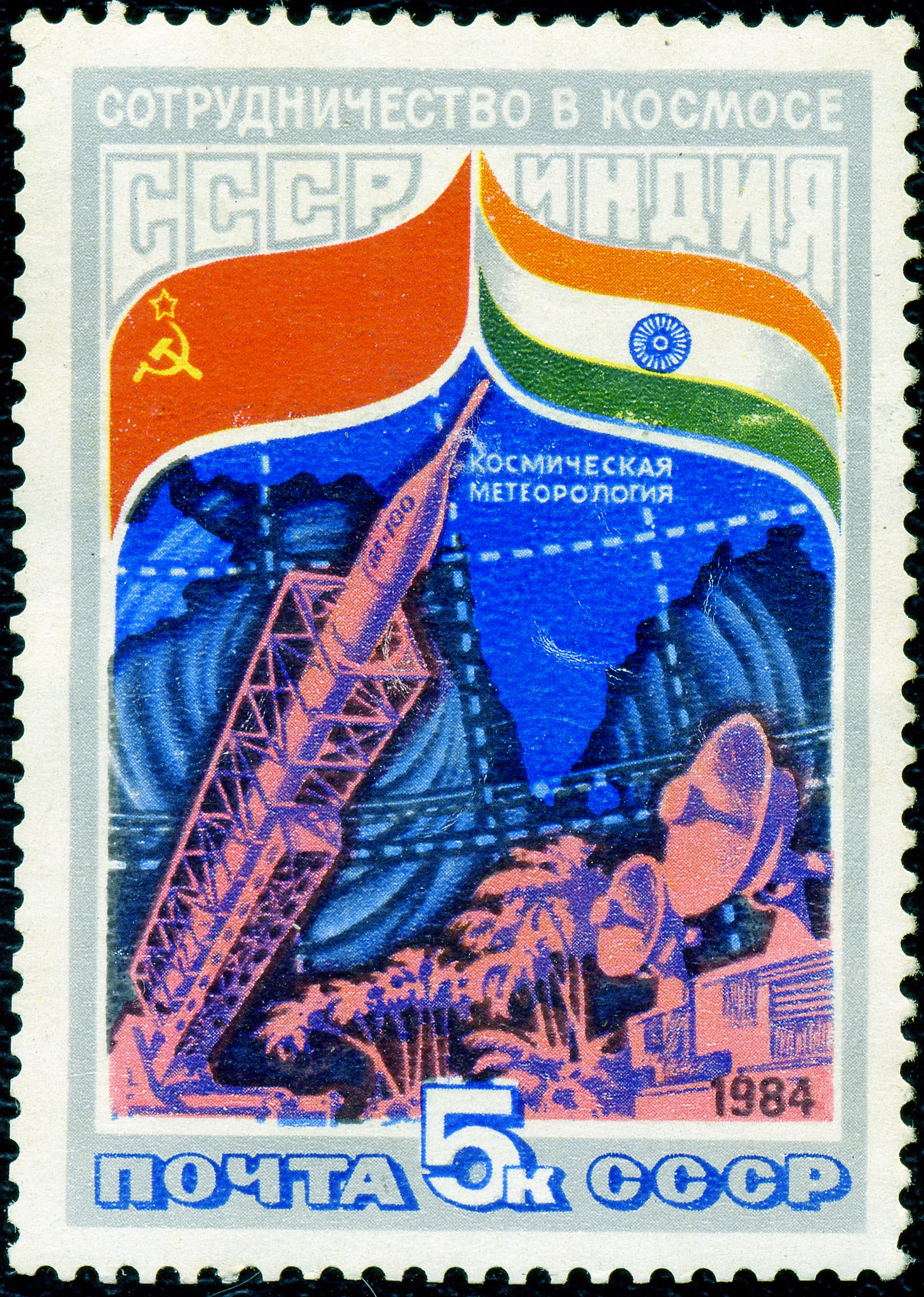
1984 USSR stamp

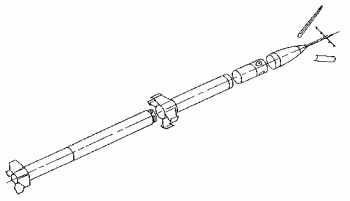
M-100

The M-100 was a two-stage Soviet sounding rocket. As some 6640 of these rockets were built between 1957 and 1990, it was the most used sounding rocket model ever. Payloads typically radioed science data to ground while descending by parachute. Cross-calibrations with Western counterparts has allowed data's inclusion in global databases. Production ceased following the dissolution of the Soviet Union.

M-100 rockets were launched from sites in the former Soviet Union. Launches also took place from Kerguelen island, TERLS in India, Koroni in Greece, Akita in Japan and Ahtopol in Bulgaria.

Notably, tests with sounding rockets such as the M-100 under the Indian Space Research Organization allowed for the development of the Rohini rockets.

== Data ==
- Payload: 15 kg
- Maximum flight height: 120 km
- Launch mass: 475 kg
- Diameter: 0.3 m
- Length: 8.34 m
