= Pedro Paulet =

Peruvian engineer

Pedro Paulet OPA
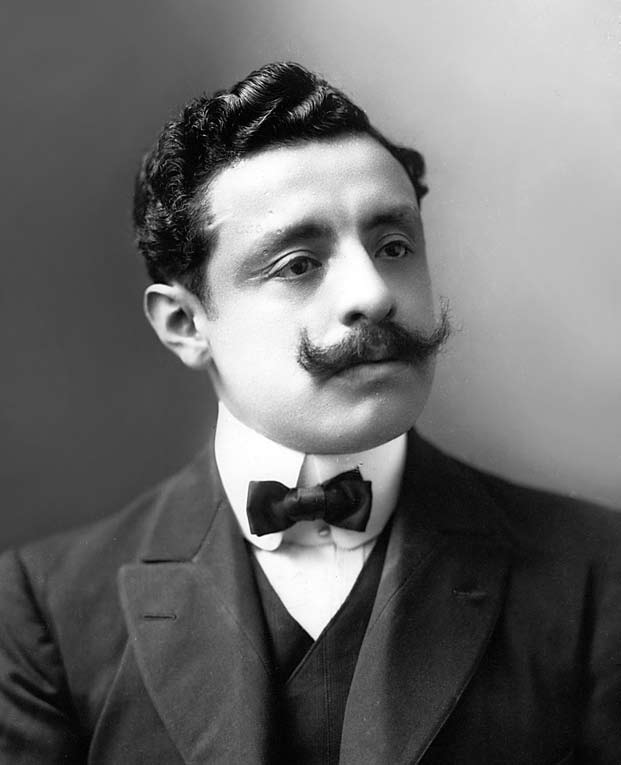
- Born: Pedro Eleodoro Paulet Mostajo; July 2, 1874; Tiabaya, Arequipa, Peru
- Died: January 30, 1945 (aged 70); Buenos Aires, Argentina
- Resting place: Presbyter Matías Maestro Cemetery, Peru
- Education: National University of Saint Augustine (BSA); University of Paris
- Occupations: Engineer; diplomat
- Relatives: Francisco Mostajo Miranda (cousin)

Pedro Eleodoro Paulet Mostajo (2 July 1874 or 4 July 1875 – 30 January 1945) was a Peruvian diplomat and industrial chemist. Some early rocket experts described him as a pioneer in aeronautics based on Paulet's retrospective statements detailing his construction of a liquid-propellant rocket engine and a modern rocket propulsion system in the 1890s, though his experiments were never independently verified.

== Early life and education ==
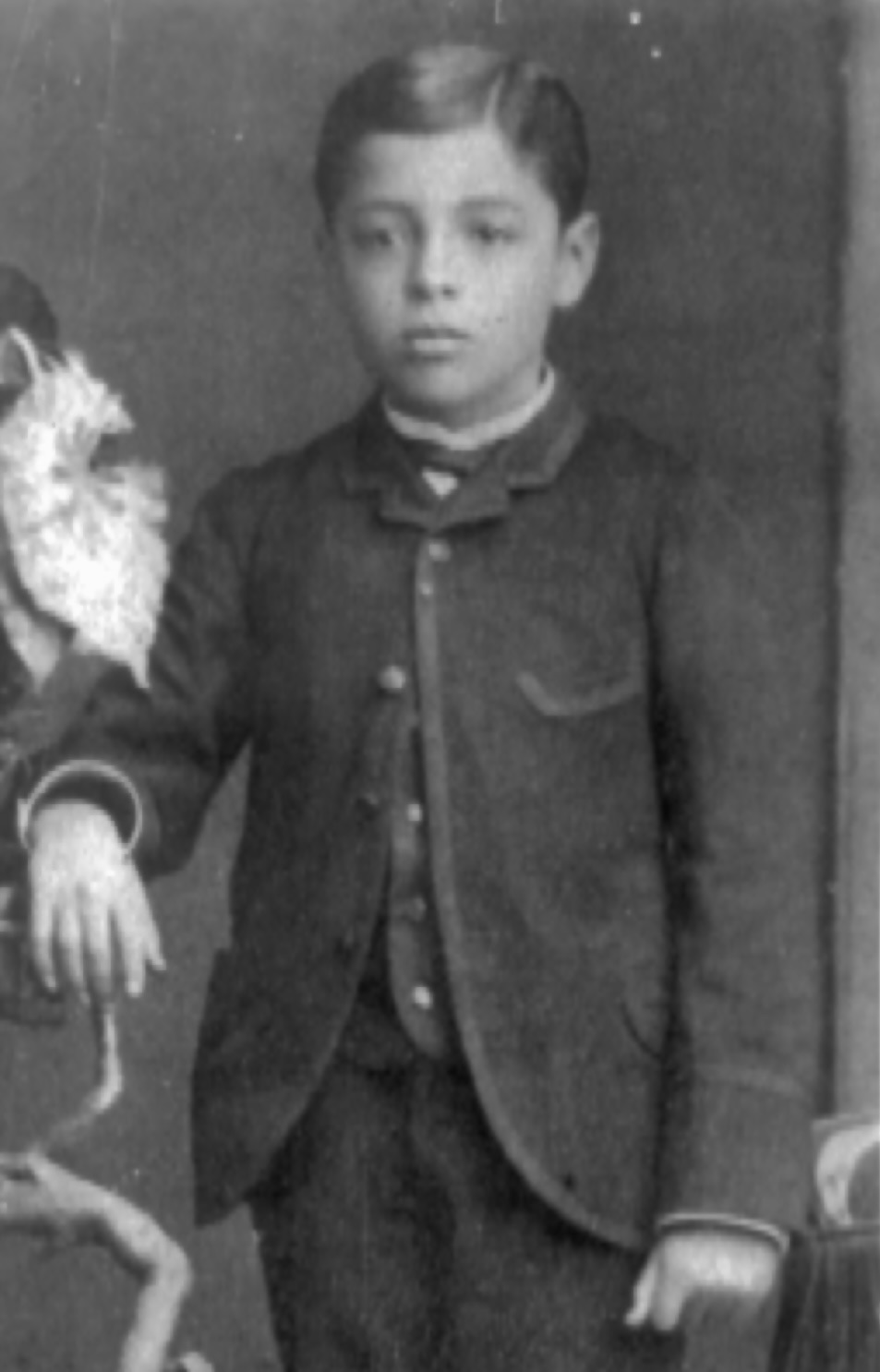
Pedro Paulet in 1883

Pedro Eleodoro Paulet Mostajo was born on 2 July 1874, to Pedro Paulet and Antonia Mostajo y Quiroz in Tiabaya, Arequipa, Peru; his father died three years later. As a child, Paulet was fascinated with flight and combustion. With the steam locomotives traveling through Arequipa, Paulet would try to learn how the large machines were propelled as a child. He was sent to the San Vicente de Paul School by his mother, with the school being founded by the Lazarist French priest Hippolyte Duhamel. After Duhamel gifted Paulet the 1865 French novel From the Earth to the Moon, an inspired Paulet would reportedly launch homemade rockets as a youth. His family reported that Paulet would make rockets by using leftover gunpowder from festivals, filling reeds coated with wax from his family's candles with the gunpowder and then tying it together with hemp string. They also said he would tie the rockets to stones or pieces of metal to gauge their strength or have the rockets travel with live animals placed inside, observing the effects rocket travel had on them. Despite being scolded by his family due to bothering his neighborhood, Paulet would instead go to open fields where he would experiment on his own.

By the age of fifteen, Paulet would begin to work with local pyrotechnicians, working with them to larger rockets with longer burn times. He enrolled at the National University of Saint Augustine when he was seventeen, founding the Patriotic Society and the Artistic Center. Paulet would show interest in the arts, being recognized as a skilled sculptor and painter, winning awards for his work. He would and Paulet would graduate with a Bachelor of Science and Arts. In late 1893, Paulet's mother would die. Despite his interests in the arts, Paulet would continue to be fixated on the power of rockets and how they could be used for transportation.

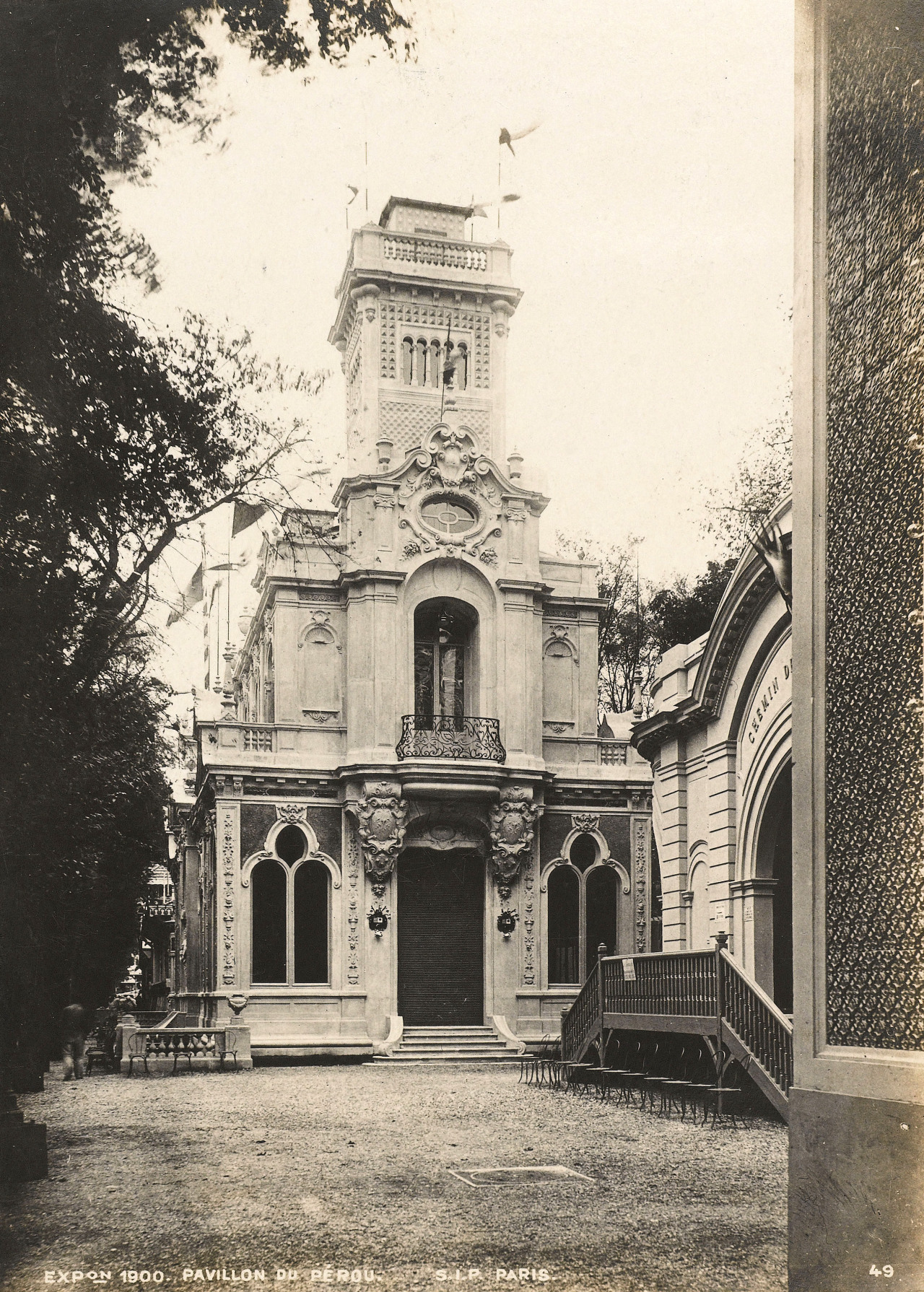
The Peruvian Pavilion for the Exposition Universelle 1900

President Remigio Morales Bermúdez, who was personally impressed by the intellect of Paulet, provided a scholarship to him in 1894 to begin studies for a degree in engineering and architecture at the University of Paris. In 1895, Paulet reportedly began to experiment with his rocket engine, using Panclastite for propulsion, as recommended by Marcellin Berthelot. When experimenting with combustible chemicals, Paulet reported he had to do so in secret due to prohibitions enforced by the police due to anarchist attacks in Paris. In one incident, he ruptured the eardrum in his left ear due to an explosion and was temporarily arrested upon suspicions of being an anarchist, though Berthelot was able to explain that Paulet was a student. After explosive experiments were prohibited in university laboratories, Paulet was forced to perform experiments in the outskirts of Paris, seeking to find a cheaper and safer alternatives for fueling rockets. In 1897, he became a member of the Société astronomique de France and reportedly began to experiment with the "Girándula Motriz", or "Power Gyro". The same year, he reportedly made a more stable rocket engine fueled by nitrogen peroxide and gasoline. Due to the use of an oxidizing agent, the engine would have had the ability to function in the vacuum environment of outer space where oxygen is not present for combustion.

Due to his fluency in English, French, German and Spanish, he served as a correspondent for various newspapers, including Le Figaro and La Petite République. With these funds, Paulet was able to continue his studies and to travel to Northern Africa, the Middle East, Russia and the United States in search of ideas on rocketry. In 1898, Paulet began his studies of industrial engineering at the Institute of Applied Chemistry at the University of Paris. While attending the university, he would study under Charles Friedel, Pierre Curie and Henri Becquerel, exchanging ideas with them on the best methods to provide rocket propulsion. Due to funding issues, loss of laboratory access and concerns with neighbors, Paulet ceased his experiments.

During the Exposition Universelle in 1900, Paulet would serve as the Deputy Commissioner for the Peruvian delegation, designing the pavilion used at the exposition. He would become a member of the Société chimique de France and be bestowed the title of Officier de l'Instruction Publique of the Ordre des Palmes académiques by France the same year. The Peruvian government would also commission to create a plan to bring wireless telegraphy to Peruvian Amazonia in 1900, with his recommendations being utilized during the project. In 1901, he would graduate with High Distinction in industrial engineering from the University of Paris.

== Career ==
=== Diplomatic work ===
Paulet first served as chancellor of the Consulate of Peru in Paris. He was named as the Peruvian Consul in Antwerp in 1902, and served in the role for a few years. Paulet designed a liquid-fueled "rocket engine" for the Avión Torpedo aircraft, with the proposal being in complete contrast to the intellectual interest in gunpowder rockets at the time. He would spend decades seeking funds for the project, though he ultimately did not find donors.

In 1904, he became the first director of the Escuela Nacional de Artes y Oficios, later known as the Instituto Superior Tecnológico Público José Pardo, after returning to Peru. He would review European institutions to develop a curriculum and purchase equipment for the school. President José Pardo y Barreda would also task Paulet with constructing the Goyeneche Hospital, directing the El Peruano newspaper and reviewing new ships for the Peruvian Navy. He wrote about a proposed military submarine in September 1909. Encouraging Minister of War Pedro Muñíz to create an aviation organization after observing the feats of aircraft in Europe, Paulet would help found the National Pro-Aviation League, which would later be developed into the Peruvian Air Force. Paulet would provide a framework to head of the National Pro-Aviation League, Juan Bielovucic, focusing on providing aircraft to defend Peru.

After knowing that he would not attain his dream of making a space vehicle while living in Peru, he decided to return to Europe. Leaving Peru in 1910, Paulet married Louise Constance Wilquet Genion, in Brussels after returning to Europe to serve as the Consul of Peru in Amsterdam. Paulet and Louise would later have seven children together; Margarita, José, Héctor, Pedro, Cecilia, Luis and Megan. During World War I, Paulet would mainly live in Paris and the health of his family would struggle due to the war, with two of his children, Margarita and José, dying due to ailments.

The Paulet family would move to London in 1920 following the deaths of their children in an effort to recover from the tragedy, with Paulet opening a successful toy factory with funding from friends. President Augusto B. Leguía would then appoint him as the consul in Dresden, Germany in 1921, with Louise selling all the family's shares for the toy company. He would be moved to Amsterdam in 1923 and a year later in 1924, he was named the Consul of Peru in Stavanger and Chargé d'Affaires in Oslo.

=== Rocketry work ===
Paulet's work was unknown prior to 27 October 1927, when the Peruvian newspaper El Comercio published a letter he wrote, in which he said that he conceived a "rocket airplane project" nearly 30 years prior. Paulet said that his rocket motor was made of vanadium, weighed 2.5 kilos, was fueled by nitrogen peroxide and gasoline, which produced three hundred explosions per minute and had ninety kilograms of thrust.

Replying to comments in 1927 by Austrian inventor Max Valier discussing a rocket powered aircraft crossing the Atlantic Ocean faster than Charles Lindbergh, Paulet – the Peruvian consul in Rotterdam at the time – criticized Valier's proposal and recommended an aircraft powered by liquid-propellant rockets, stating that he had made plans for a rocket-propelled aircraft thirty years prior. Paulet's recommendation occurred at a time when news of Robert H. Goddard's 1926 liquid-propellant rocket launch was not notable, details about Goddard's work had not reached Europe and in fact, no liquid-propelled rockets had been launched yet in Europe. A unique feature of Paulet's rocket design was its difference from Goddard's; unlike Goddard's rocket, Paulet's rocket utilized an intermittent fuel injection process that provided more efficiency and stability. Paulet's description of past experiments would have made him the first person to create a liquid-propelled rocket, nearly three decades ahead of Goddard. Paulet stated that his experiments were "made, truly, without witnesses" and called on former classmates to defend his work.

According to the Paulet family, American businessman Henry Ford would also contact Paulet to discuss purchasing his inventions as rocket cars were popular at the time, though Paulet would refuse as he wanted to continue to pursue spaceflight. Visiting the German rocket association Verein für Raumschiffahrt (VfR), Paulet's liquid-propelled rocket design was applauded by Valier for its strength. The VfR would use Paulet's research throughout their publications in Germany and he would finally gain interest in his work from Nazi Germany. The Astronomische Gesellschaft invited Paulet to join the society in order to progress research in rocketry, though once he discovered that the program was primarily for a weapon, he refused to work with the government and never shared the formula to his liquid propellant.

=== Later life ===
In 1929, he was named Consul General of Peru in Rotterdam and would continue work on his rocket designs with two Dutch engineers; Hans Doerr and a man named Philip. Into the 1930s, Paulet promoted the development of Peru on the international stage, publishing an outline on how Germans could migrate to the nation and assist with its development. He would continue to experiment on aircraft designs, formulating ideas of thermoelectric generators being placed on the exterior aircraft in 1930, focusing on the temperature difference between the cold exterior in the stratosphere and the warm interior of the vehicle. In 1932, he was named Consul General in Yokohama where he would write Modern Japan and its Economic Bases.

He would return to Peru in 1935 with his family, all except for his oldest child Hector who had married a woman in Japan, with Paulet helping with the creation of the Commercial Department of the Chancellery. He sought funding for creating a jet engine in Peru and the United Kingdom, although he was unsuccessful. Paulet would be named Consul General in Buenos Aires in 1941. When Peru broke diplomatic relations with Japan during World War II, Paulet's engine was lost while in transit between Japan and Peru. In 1944, Paulet stated that his rocket could fly up to 600 miles per hour in the outer atmosphere.

Towards the end of his life, Paulet would experience tinnitus and dizziness due to previous damage to his ears, causing him great stress. On 30 January 1945, upon receiving a telegram from Peru saying that he had reached the age limit of his diplomatic service, Paulet became upset and died of cardiac arrest in Buenos Aires, Argentina; he was found still clutching the telegram according to Ambassador Jacinto Rada.

== Veracity ==
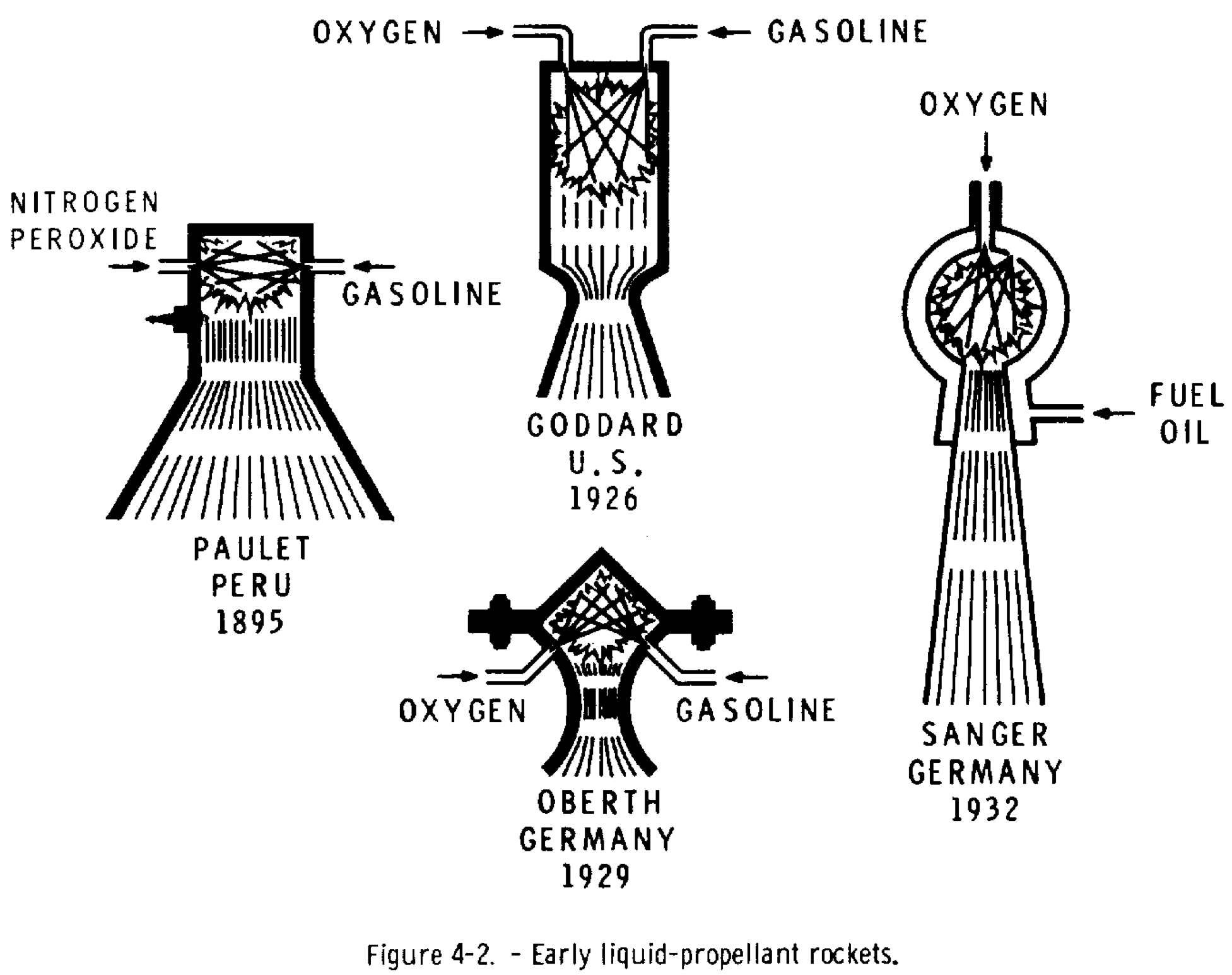
Models of early liquid-propellant published by the NASA Lewis Research Center, featuring Paulet's 1895 engine on the left

Paulet's work was accepted by some prominent experts in rocketry, but it was not independently verified. Russian aviation writer Aleksander B. Sherschevsky supported Paulet, saying "The advent of the space age became a reality with the development of the propulsion engine and spacecraft designed and built by the Peruvian Pedro Paulet between 1899 and 1903." Max Valier stated that Paulet's rocket engine had "amazing power" and that "the work of the Peruvian Paulet is most important for present projects leading to rocket ships, for it proved for the first time, in contrast to powder rockets burning only a few seconds, that by using liquid propellants, the construction of a rocket motor functioning for periods of hours would be feasible." Some of the principal founders of NASA recognized Paulet as an inspiration according to BBC News.

=== Early doubts ===
German science writer Willy Ley was one of the first people to express skepticism of Paulet and stated that "The doubts are obviously correct" in Grundriss einer Geschichte der Rakete. He also strongly criticized Scherschevsky, calling him "lazy by nature", stating that he "uncritically put hearsay into some of his articles, and into his one and only book."

James H. Wyld was more cautious, saying that "Paulet did not publish an account of his work until 1927, in an obscure news article in [..] "El Commercio" [sic], so that the validity of his claim may be rather doubtful".

=== Reception in the Peruvian press ===
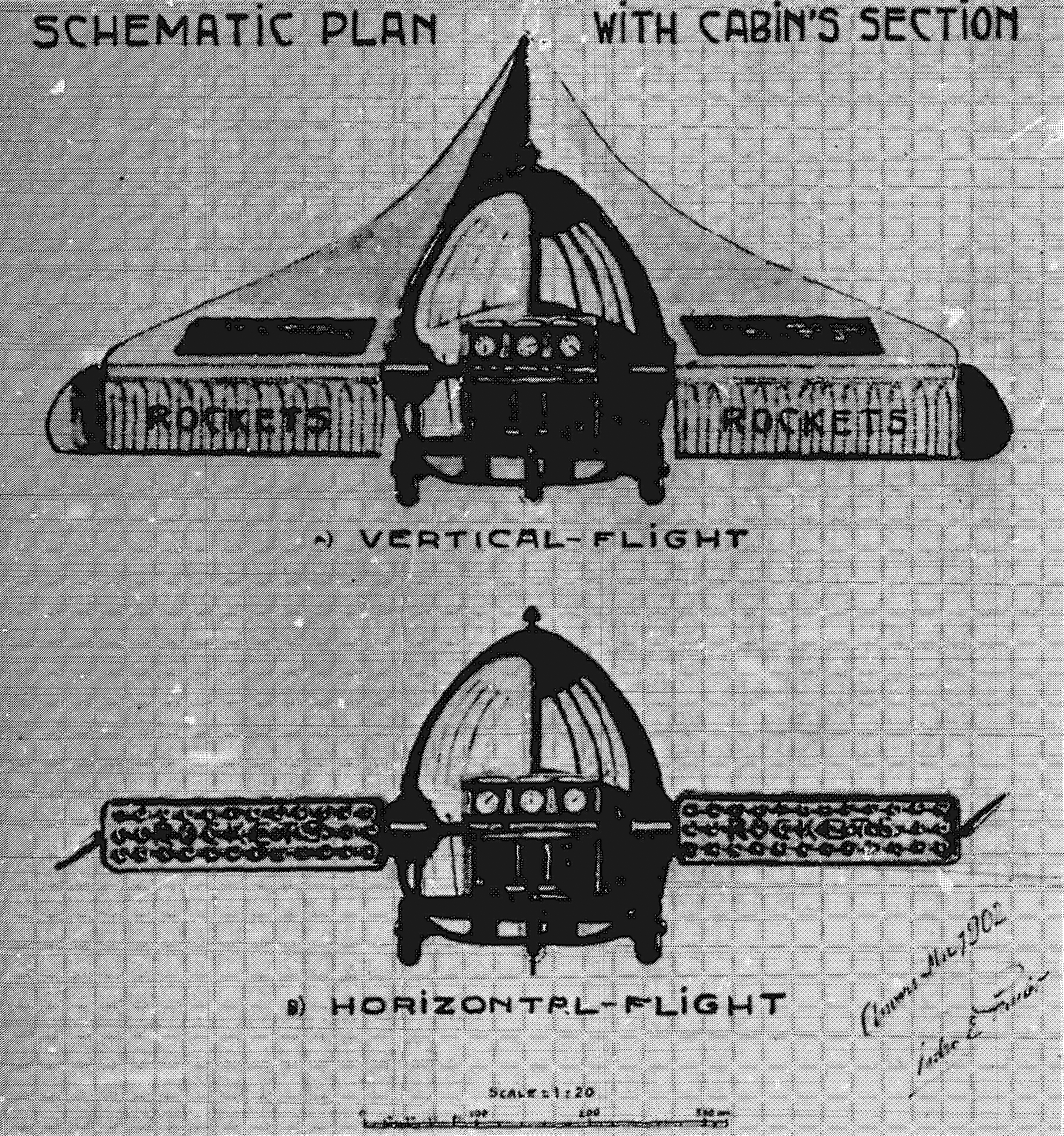
The Avión Torpedo System reportedly conceptualized in 1902 was a rocket-powered aircraft featuring an aircraft canopy fixed to a delta wing on a swivel for horizontal or vertical flight.

El Comercio published several artistic interpretations of Paulet's designs on 10 March 1965, in the article A Peruvian Engineer is the World Forerunner of Jet Propulsion Aircraft. They were printed with a label "Amberes -- Mai 1902, Pedro E. Paulet", but their authenticity is unsupported.

On 15 March 1965, El Comercio summarized an interview given by Paulet in Buenos Aires in 1944, in which he stated that his rocket would fly at 600 miles per hour in the upper atmosphere, or, at much lower speeds, "travel like a submarine" under the ocean.

Another article by El Comercio on 12 December cited Manuel del Castillo, president of the Organismo Nacional de Investigacions Espaciales, said to prove Paulet's work, citing Wyld's June 1947 article; ironically, it provided an excerpt of Wyld's article where it was stated that "the validity of his claim may be rather doubtful."

=== Later skepticism ===
Frederick I. Ordway III and Wernher von Braun gathered some information on Paulet's work during the 1960s. They located the "news article", which turned out to be a letter to the editor written by Paulet and published in the October 7, 1927 issue of El Comercio.

Ordway found no additional evidence. He stated that Paulet could have known about German and French rocketry and astronautical advancements due to living in Europe in the 1920s, and that it was impossible to know how many of the ideas in Paulet's letter were original. Ordway concluded that "Based on information available [at the time of writing], his claim of having experimented with liquid-propellant rocket motors in Paris in the late 1890s cannot be proved. To date, no actual witnesses have been located, nor any solid evidence uncovered as to the possible existence of the rocket motor."

Liquid propellant chemist John D. Clark wrote in his 1972 book Ignition!: An Informal History of Liquid Rocket Propellants that "Paulet's claims are completely false, and his alleged firings never took place". Clark said that the engine "would sound like a whole battery of fully automatic 75 millimeter antiaircraft guns" firing at 300 times per minute if, as Paulet said, the engine had 200 lbs of thrust, and that someone would have recalled such an occurrence.

== Legacy ==
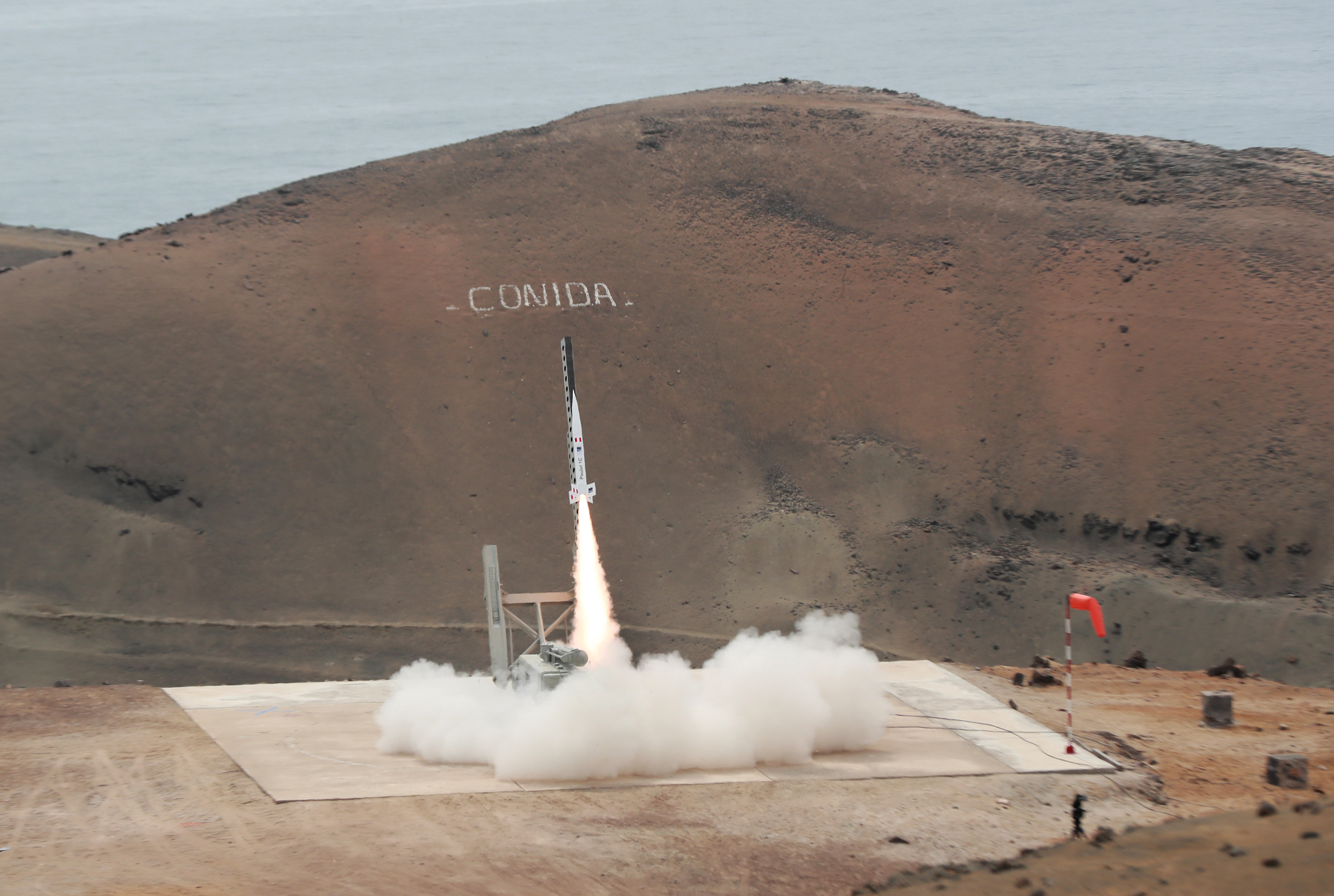
The Paulet I-C of the National Commission for Aerospace Research and Development, launched in December 2021

A statue of Paulet is present in his home district of Tiabaya and in the Parque Domodossola of the Malecón de Miraflores. In 1995, the Peruvian Air Force constructs a mausoleum for Paulet at the Cementerio Presbítero Matías Maestro. Paulet's Avión Torpedo was featured in a Google Doodle to commemorate the birthday of Pedro Paulet in 2011. In Peru, the National Commission for Aerospace Research and Development launched a series of rockets bearing Paulet's name. Beginning in 2016, he was prominently featured on the 100 soles banknote of the Peruvian Nuevo Sol.

== Awards ==
- France
  - Officier de l'Instruction Publique of the Ordre des Palmes académiques
- Trujillo
  - Gold Medal for his collaboration with constructing the Freedom Monument

== See also ==
- Konstantin Tsiolkovsky
- Robert H. Goddard
- Spacecraft propulsion
- Paulet (sounding rocket)

== Works cited ==
- Hill, R., ed. (1986). History of Rocketry and Astronautics: Proceedings of the Third through the Sixth History Symposia of the International Academy of Astronautics. American Astronomical Society. ISBN 0877032602.
- von Braun, Wernher; Ordway, Frederick (1969). History of Rocketry & Space Travel. Thomas Y. Crowell Co. LCCN 76-94786.

== Bibliography ==
- Mejía, Álvaro (2017). "Pedro Paulet, sabio multidisciplinario". Persona & Cultura (in Spanish). 14 (14). Universidad Católica San Pablo: 95–122. doi:10.36901/persona.v14i14.209. S2CID 258143557.
- Zlatar Stambuk, José (2000). Pedro Paulet Mostajo (PDF) (in Spanish). Lima.
