= National Commission for Aerospace Research and Development =

Peruvian national space agency

- Comisión Nacional de Investigación y Desarrollo Aeroespacial

Space agency overview
- Formed: June 11, 1974; 52 years ago
- Headquarters: 1069 Luis Felipe Villarán St. San Isidro, Lima, Peru
- Space agency executive: MAG. FAP. Jose A. Garcia Morgan, Institutional Head
- Parent department: Ministry of Defense
- Website: www.gob.pe/conida

The National Commission for Aerospace Research and Development (CONIDA) (Spanish: Comisión Nacional de Investigación y Desarrollo Aeroespacial) is a national space agency tasked with government space activities in Peru.

== History ==
CONIDA was founded on 11 June 1974 following Decree Law 20643, designated to be an entity subordinate to then the Ministry of Aeronautics, which was later merged into the Ministry of Defense.

Peru joined the Asia-Pacific Space Cooperation Organization on 28 October 2005.

== Organization ==
=== Locations ===
==== Headquarters ====
The headquarters of CONIDA is located in San Isidro, Lima, Peru, one of the most affluent areas of Lima. CONIDA's headquarters serves as the main facility of the agency and features many meeting and operations rooms, a library, an audiovisual center and cafeteria.

==== Punta Lobos ====
The Punto Lobos site is located in Pucusana, Lima Province. The site is primarily used for research purposes, including rocket technology and astronomy. This is where CONIDA's first research rocket, the Paulet I, and other rockets were launched.

==== National Satellite Image Operations Center (CNOIS) ====
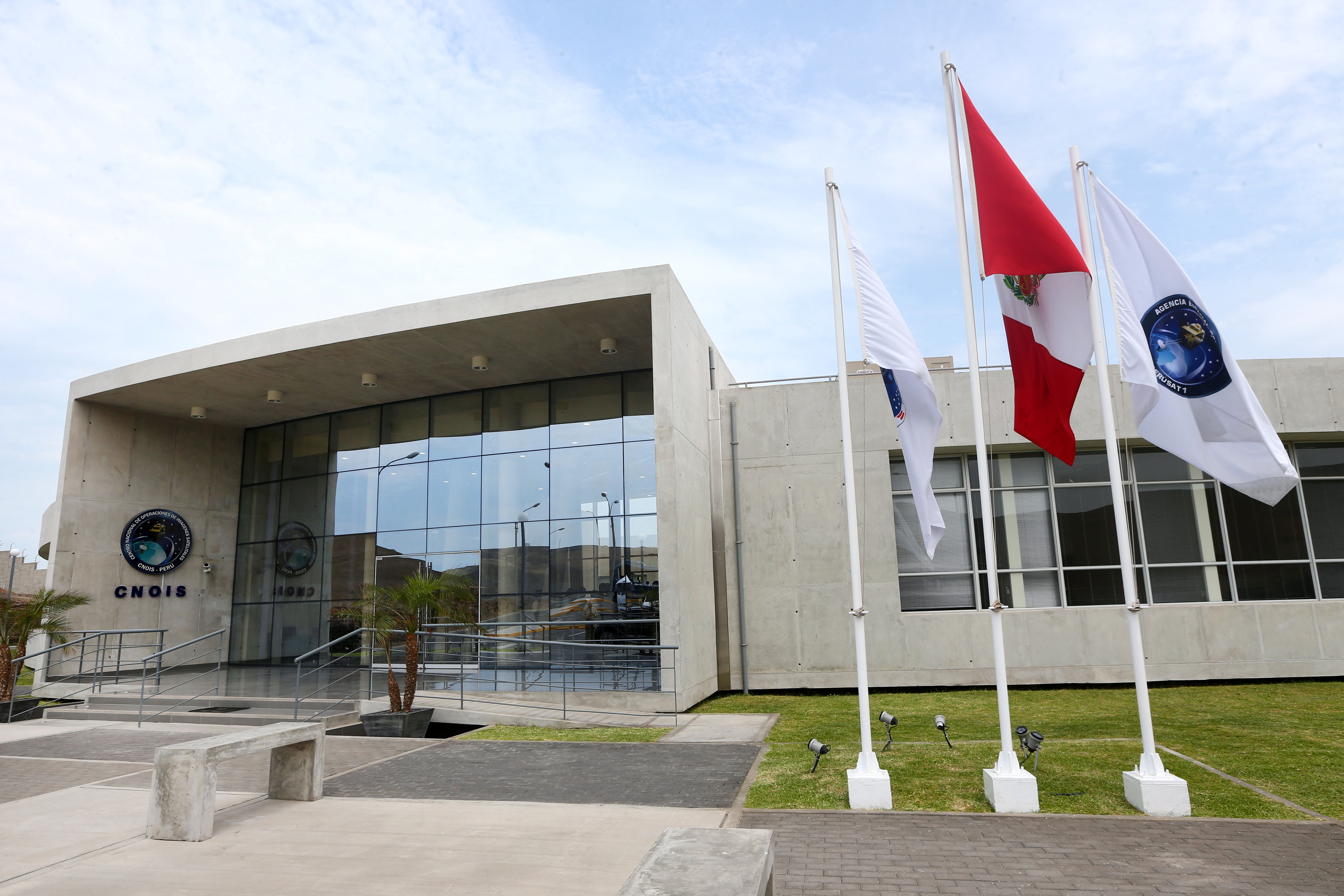
Headquarters of the CNOIS

The National Satellite Image Operations Center (CNOIS) is also located in the Pucusana district. The center is responsible for gathering, storing, observing and distributing satellite imagery gathered by CONIDA.

== Programs ==
=== Space flight ===
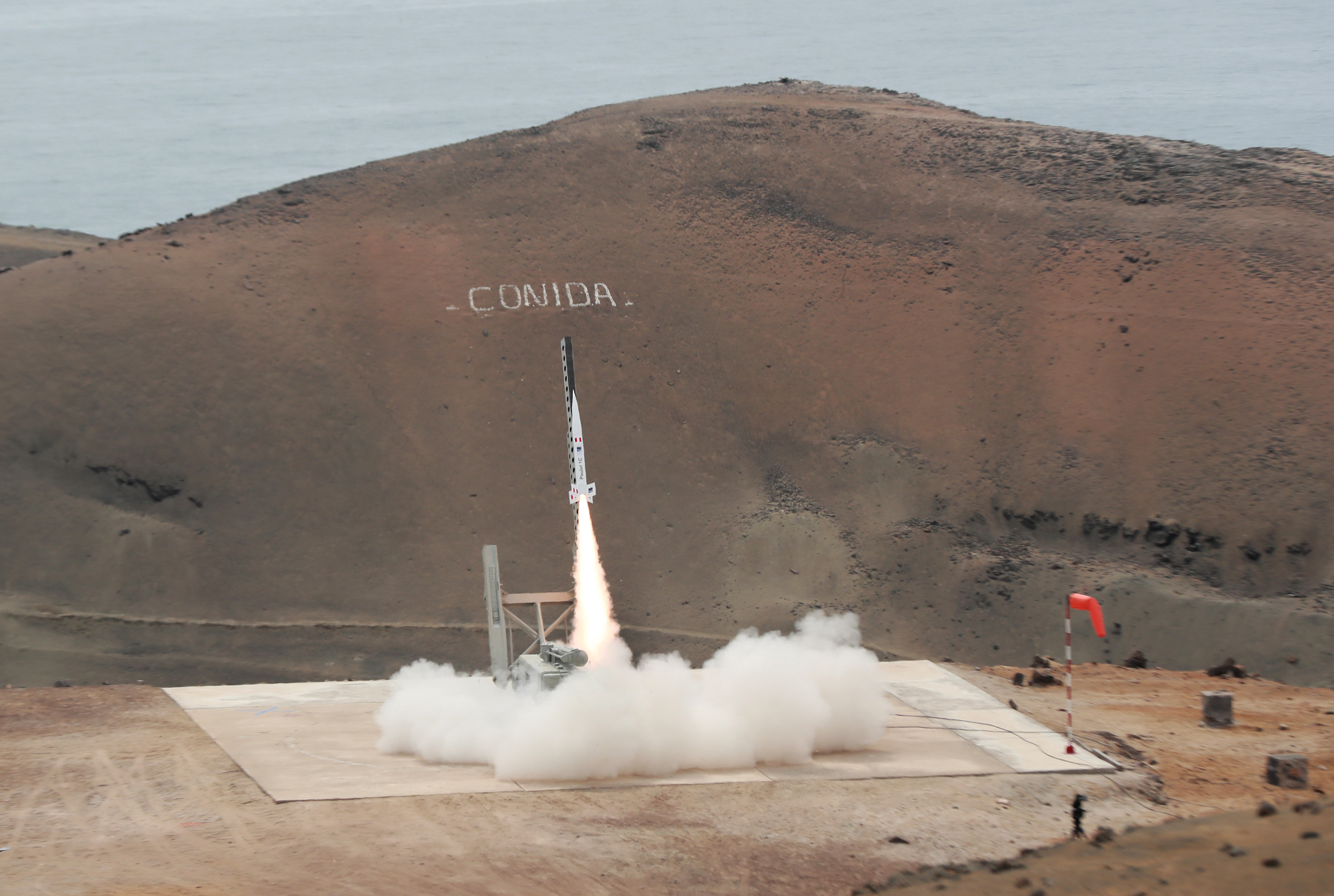
Paulet I-C launched in December 2021

The Paulet I, a research rocket named after the Peruvian rocket propulsion pioneer Pedro Paulet, was launched on 26 December 2006 in Pucusana District, Lima Province at the Punta Lobos research center.

The Paulet I-B was launched on 11 June 2013 on the 39th anniversary of CONIDA's foundation. The rocket – made entirely of Peru's domestic equipment – entered the stratosphere, travelling just over 15 km above Peruvian territory. The successful launch encouraged Institutional Head General Mario Pimentel Higueras to state that "By the year 2020 we will have the possibility of reaching 300 kilometers in height, which will put us one step away from placing Peruvian satellites in the space with 100% national technology".

The Paulet I-C was launched at the Pucusana complex on 22 December 2021. The launch had the objectives to assess propellant usage, trajectory and the observation of what the rocket was subjected to during launch.

=== Satellites ===
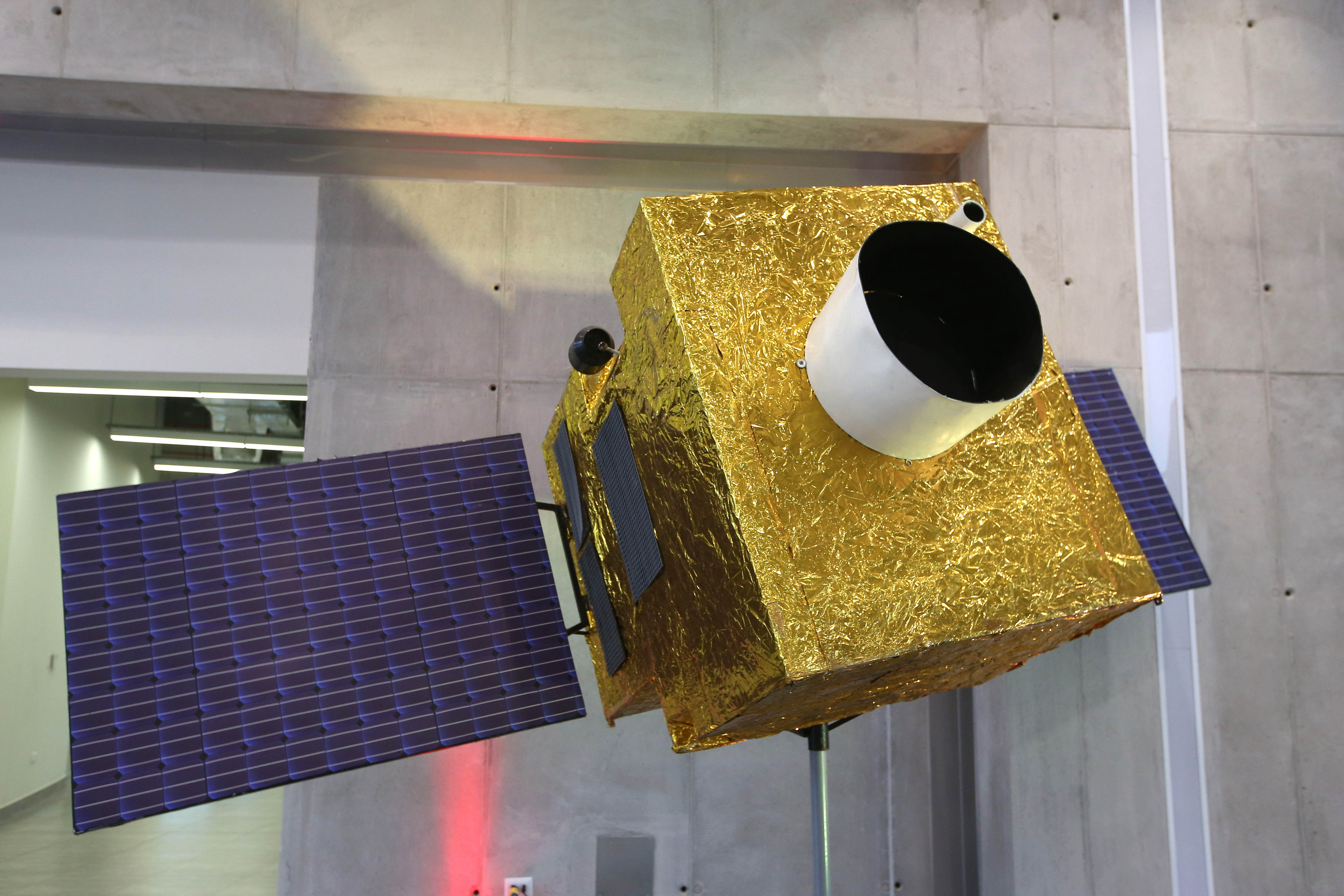
Model of PeruSat-1

On 19 July 2006, the National Satellite Image Operations Center (CNOIS) was founded. Nearly ten years later in February 2016, the CNOIS began operation of its own space technology. Much of the equipment was developed in partnership with the European aeronautics company Airbus Defence and Space.

Months after the CNOIS began formal operations, the collaboration with Airbus Defence and Space resulted with PeruSat-1, an Earth observation satellite. PeruSat-1 was launched on 15 September 2016 from the Kourou Space Center in French Guiana with the assistance of Arianespace, on board Vega flight VV07. On 8 December 2016, CONIDA and CNOIS were officially given control of the satellite following its launch.

== See also ==
- List of government space agencies
- Pedro Paulet – Peruvian rocket propulsion pioneer
- Chilca Launch Range
