= Sounding rocket =

Rocket designed to take measurements during its flight

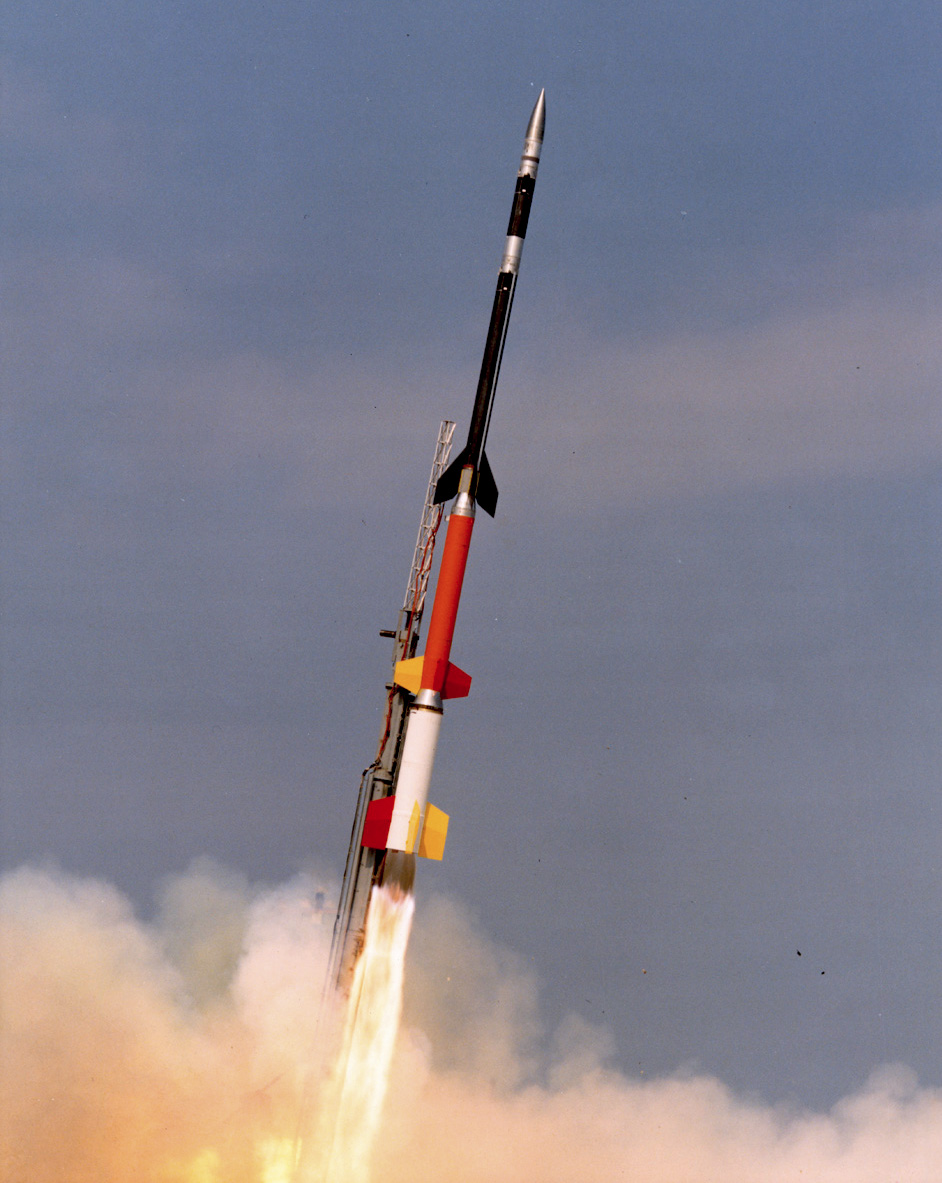
A Black Brant XII being launched from Wallops Flight Facility

A sounding rocket or rocketsonde, sometimes called a research rocket or a suborbital rocket, is an instrument-carrying rocket designed to take measurements and perform scientific experiments during its sub-orbital flight. The rockets are often used to launch instruments from 50 to 150 km (30 to 90 mi) above the surface of the Earth, the altitude generally between weather balloons and satellites; the maximum altitude for balloons is about 40 km (25 mi), and the minimum for satellites is approximately 120 km (75 mi).

Due to their suborbital flight profile, sounding rockets are often much simpler than their counterparts built for orbital flight. Certain sounding rockets have an apogee between 1,000 and 1,500 km (600 and 900 mi), such as the Black Brant X and XII. Sounding rockets may be flown to altitudes as high as 3,000 km (2,000 mi) to allow observing times of around 40 minutes to provide geophysical observations of the magnetosphere, ionosphere, thermosphere, and mesosphere.

== Etymology ==
The origin of the term comes from nautical vocabulary to sound, which is to throw a weighted line from a ship into the water to measure the water's depth. The term itself has its etymological roots in the Romance languages word for probe, of which there are nouns like sonda and sonde and verbs like sondar, which means "to do a survey or a poll." Sounding in the rocket context is equivalent to "taking a measurement."

== Design ==
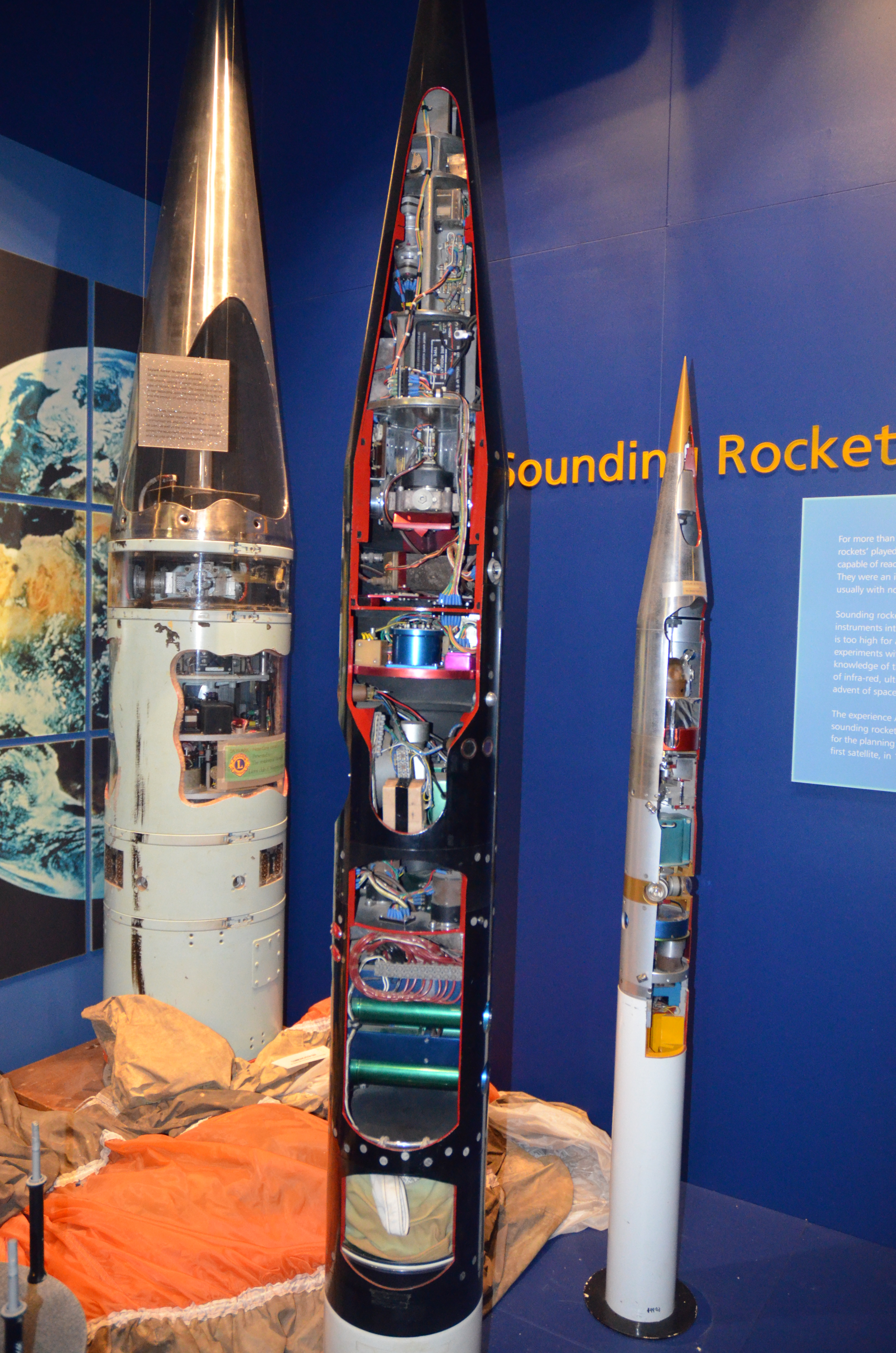
Sample payloads for sounding rockets

The basic elements of a modern sounding rocket are a solid-fuel rocket motor and a science payload. In certain sounding rockets, the payload may be nothing more than a smoke trail as in the Nike Smoke, which is used to determine wind directions and strengths more accurately than may be determined by weather balloons. A sounding rocket, such as the Nike-Apache, may deposit sodium clouds to observe very high altitude winds. Larger, higher altitude rockets have multiple stages to increase altitude and payload capability.

A flight of a sounding rocket has several parts. During the boost phase, the rocket burns its fuel to accelerate upwards, nearly vertically. Once the motor burns all of its fuel, the rocket may fall away to allow the payload to coast along a ballistic trajectory. The path of the rocket is then nearly parabolic, being influenced only by gravity and small wind resistance at high altitudes. The speed decreases near the highest point of the flight, the apogee, allowing the payload to linger around this point for a few minutes. Lastly, the rocket descends, sometimes deploying a drag source such as a small balloon or a parachute. The average flight time is less than 30 minutes; usually between 5 and 20 minutes.

Sounding rockets have used balloons, aeroplanes, and artillery as first stages. Project Farside used a rockoon composed of a 106,188-cubic-metre (3,750,000 ft^{3}) balloon, lifting a four-stage rocket. Sparoair was launched in the air from Navy F4D and F-4 fighters. Sounding rockets can also be launched from artillery guns, such as Project HARP's 5-, 7- and 15-inch (130, 180 and 380 mm) guns, sometimes having additional rocket stages.

== Development history ==
The earliest sounding rockets used liquid propellant, such as the WAC Corporal, Aerobee, and Viking. The German-built V-2 was used in both the US and the USSR immediately after World War II. Starting in the 1950s, inexpensive surplus military boosters such as those used by the Nike, Talos, Terrier, and Sparrow were used. Since the 1960s, most sounding rockets have been specifically designed for the purpose, such as the Canadian solid-fuel Black Brant (first flown in 1959). By the early 1960s, the sounding rocket was considered established technology.

=== US and USSR ===
The earliest attempts at developing sounding rockets were in the Soviet Union. The first All-Union Conference on the Study of the Stratosphere was held in Leningrad (now St. Petersburg) in 1934. The conference primarily dealt with balloon radiosondes, however, there was a small group of rocket developers who sought to develop "recording rockets" to explore the upper atmosphere. Sergey Korolev, who later became the leading figure of the Soviet space program, gave a presentation in which he called for "the development of scientific instruments for high-altitude rockets to study the upper atmosphere." Soviet efforts to develop a sounding rocket prior to WWII were unsuccessful. P. I. Ivanov built a three-stage rocket which flew in March 1946. However, its development was ended because it lacked sufficient thrust to lift a research payload.

The first successful sounding rocket was created at the California Institute of Technology (Caltech). In the 1930s, a group of rocket enthusiasts had gathered there under the leadership of Theodore von Kármán and Frank Malina. During WWII, they became involved in various defense programs, including work to produce a guided missile called the Corporal. As an interim step, they developed a liquid-propellant rocket to meet the Signal Corps' requirements for a sounding rocket, capable of carrying 11 kilograms (25 lb) of instruments to 30 kilometres (100,000 ft). As this rocket lacked a guidance mechanism, it was named the WAC Corporal for "without attitude control". It was first flown in 1944, and was quickly made obsolete. German V-2 rockets captured during WWII were more powerful and dominated US rocketry (including sounding rocket flights) in the late 1940s, but were expensive and of limited supply. Combining the launch capability of the V-2 and manufacturing techniques of the WAC Corporal, the Aerobee sounding rocket was developed by the Aerojet Corporation as a cost-effective research rocket. Over 1,000 Aerobees were flown between 1947 and 1985. (Note: One engine produced for the Aerobee ultimately powered the second stage of the Vanguard rocket, which was the first purpose-built satellite launch vehicle. The AJ10 engine used by many Aerobees eventually evolved into the AJ10-190 which formed the orbital maneuvering system of the Space Shuttle.) Another US replacement for the V-2 was the Viking rocket developed by the US Navy as a sounding rocket and to advance guided missile technology. It was flown until the mid-1950s, with the last two Vikings used as part of a hurried attempt to launch a satellite into orbit.

The USSR also pursued V-2-based sounding rockets. They had captured several key V-2 production facilities in 1945, from which Korolev oversaw the development of the more reliable R-1. This was primarily built as a tactical ballistic missile, but was also used as a sounding rocket: two R-1As were flown in 1949 as sounding rockets, followed in the early to mid-1950s by four R-1Bs, two R-1Vs, three R-1Ds, five R-1Es, and one R-1E (A-1). The R-2A, could reach altitudes of 190 km (120 mi) and was flown between 1957 and 1962. Fifteen R-5Vs were flown from 1965 to 1983. Two R-5 VAOs were flown in 1964 and 1965. The first solid-fueled Soviet sounding rocket was the M-100. Some 6,640 M-100 sounding rockets were flown from 1957 to 1990, making it the world's most-used sounding rocket.

=== Other countries ===
Other early users of sounding rockets were Britain, France, Japan and Canada.

Great Britain developed the Skylark series and the Skua for the International Geophysical Year.

France had begun the design of a Super V-2, but that program had been abandoned in the late 1940s due to the inability of France to manufacture all of the necessary components. Development of the Veronique began in 1949, but it was not until 1952 that the first full-scale Veronique was launched. Veronique variants were flown until 1974. The Monica family was all solid-fueled, and a number of versions were built. These were later replaced by the ONERA series.

Japan used the Kappa rocket, and also pursued rockoons.

Canada developed the Black Brant solid-fuel sounding rocket in the 1950s, initially for research of the upper atmosphere and anti-ballistic missile technology. The altitude it reached brought Canada the claim of being the "third nation to reach space". Known for their reliability, the Black Brant family continue to be flown by the Canadian Space Agency and NASA in the 2000s.

The People's Republic of China was the last nation to launch a new liquid-fueled sounding rocket, the T-7. It was first flown in 1960 from a simple launch site. (Note: The first T-7 launch site had the "command center" and borrowed power generator in a grass hut separated from the launcher by a small river, with no communication equipment inbetween.) The T-7 family of rockets created a lineage which led to the Chinese satellite program. Vital in this program was Qian Xuesen (Tsien Hsue-shen in Wade Guiles transliteration) who had worked with the Caltech group.

== Advantages ==
Sounding rockets are advantageous for some research because of their low cost (often using military surplus rocket motors), relatively short lead time (sometimes less than six months) and their ability to conduct research in areas inaccessible to either balloons or satellites. They are also used as test beds for equipment that will be used in more expensive and risky orbital spaceflight missions. The smaller size of a sounding rocket also makes launching from temporary sites possible, allowing field studies at remote locations, including ships at sea.

Sounding rockets have been used for the examination of atmospheric nuclear tests by revealing the passage of the shock wave through the atmosphere. In more recent times, sounding rockets have been used for other nuclear weapons research.

== Applications ==
=== Meteorology ===
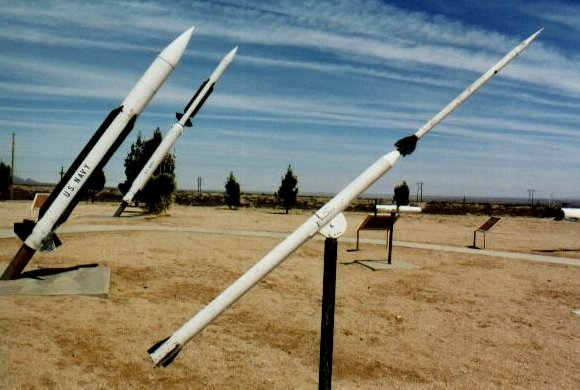
A Loki-Dart (foreground) on display at the White Sands Missile Range rocket garden

Weather observations, up to an altitude of 75 km (50 mi), are done with rocketsondes, a kind of sounding rocket for atmospheric observations that consists of a rocket and radiosonde. The sonde records data on temperature, moisture, wind speed and direction, wind shear, atmospheric pressure, and air density during the flight. Position data (altitude and latitude/longitude) may also be recorded.

Common meteorological rockets are the Loki and Super Loki. They are typically 3.7 m (12 ft) tall and powered by a 10 cm (3.9 in) diameter solid fuel rocket motor. The rocket motor separates at an altitude of 1,500 m (4,900 ft) and the rest of the rocketsonde coasts to its apogee, or highest point. They can be launched to an altitude between 20 and 113 km (12 and 70 mi).

=== Research ===
Sounding rockets are commonly used for:

- Research in aeronomy, the study of the upper atmosphere, which requires this tool for in situ measurements in the upper atmosphere.
- Ultraviolet and X-ray astronomy, which require being above the bulk of the Earth's atmosphere.
- Microgravity research which benefits from a few minutes of weightlessness on rockets launched to altitudes of a few hundred kilometers.
- Remote sensing of Earth resources, to gain an essentially instant synoptic view of the geographical area under observation.

=== Dual use ===
Due to the high military relevance of ballistic missile technology, there has always been a close relationship between sounding rockets and military missiles. It is a typical dual-use technology, which can be used for both civil and military purposes. During the Cold War, the Federal Republic of Germany cooperated on this topic with countries that had not signed the Non-Proliferation Treaty on Nuclear Weapons at that time, such as Brazil, Argentina and India. In the course of investigations by the German peace movement, this cooperation was revealed by a group of physicists in 1983. The international discussion that was thus set in motion led to the development of the Missile Technology Control Regime (MTCR) at the level of G7 states. Since then, lists of technological equipment whose export is subject to strict controls have been drawn up within the MTCR framework.

== Major operators and programs ==
- Andøya Space Center in Norway operates two sounding rocket launch sites, one at Andøya and one at Svalbard, since 1962.
- Poker Flat Research Range is owned by the University of Alaska Fairbanks.
- The British Skylark sounding rocket programme began in 1955 and was used for 441 launches from 1957 to 2005. Skylark 12, from 1976, could lift 200 kilograms (440 lb) to 575 kilometres (357 mi) altitude.
- The British also developed the Falstaff sounding rocket as a part of the Chevaline program. There were eight launches between 1969 and 1979 from the Woomera Test Range, Australia.
- Cedar, a program of the Haigazian College Rocket Society (Lebanon), Ceadar 8 crossed the Karman line
- Vikram Sarabhai Space Centre (VSSC), India's main research and launch centre, developed and operates the Rohini sounding rocket series.
- Delft Aerospace Rocket Engineering in The Netherlands operates the Stratos sounding rocket program, which reached 21.5 km (13.4 mi) in 2015.
- Exela Space Industries is developing the Aims-1 sounding rocket that will launch to 100 km (60 mi) in 2035.
- Evolution Space operates the Gold Chain Cowboy sounding rocket with launch to 124.5 km (77.4 mi) on April 22, 2023.
- The Australian Space Research Institute (ASRI) operates a Small Sounding Rocket Program (SSRP) for launching payloads (mostly educational) to altitudes of about 7 km (4.3 mi).
- The Indian Institute of Space Science and Technology (IIST) launched a Sounding Rocket (Vyom) in May, 2012, which reached an altitude of 15 km (9.3 mi). Vyom Mk-II is in its conceptual design stage with an objective to reach a 70 km (43 mi) altitude with a 20 kg (44 lb) payload.
- The University of Queensland operates Terrier-Orion sounding rockets (capable of reaching altitudes in excess of 300 km or 190 mi) as part of their HyShot hypersonics research.
- Iranian Space Agency operated its first sounding rocket in February 2007.
- UP Aerospace operates the SpaceLoft XL sounding rocket that can reach altitudes of 225 km (140 mi).
- TEXUS and MiniTEXUS, German rocket programmes at Esrange for DLR and ESA microgravity research programmes.
- Astrium operates missions with sounding rockets on a commercial basis, as prime contractor to ESA or the German Aerospace Centre (DLR).
- MASER, Swedish rocket programme at Esrange for ESA microgravity research programmes.
- MAXUS, German-Swedish rocket programme at Esrange for ESA microgravity research programmes.
- Pakistan's SUPARCO launched Rehbar series of sounding rockets, based on American Nike-Cajun series of rockets, from 1962 to 1971.
- REXUS, German-Swedish rocket programme at Esrange for DLR and ESA student experiment programmes.
- The NASA Sounding Rocket Program.
  - NASA routinely flies the Terrier Mk 70 boosted Improved Orion, lifting 270–450-kg (600–1,000-pound) payloads into the exoatmospheric region between 97 and 201 km (60 and 125 mi).
- The JAXA operates the sounding rockets S-Series: S-310 / S-520 / SS-520.
- United States/New Zealand company Rocket Lab developed the Ātea series of sounding rockets to carry 5 to 70 kg (11 to 154 lb) payloads to altitudes of 250 km (160 mi) or greater, launched once on 30 November 2009.
- The Meteor rockets were built in Poland between 1963 and 1974.
- The Kartika I rocket was built and launched in Indonesia by LAPAN on 1964, becoming the fourth sounding rocket in Asia, after those from Japan, China and Pakistan.
- The Soviet Union developed an extensive program using rockets such as the M-100, the most used ever; its successor by its successor state, Russia, is the MR-20 and later the MR-30.
- Since 1965, Brazil has been developing and launching its Sonda series of sounding rockets, which has served as the foundation for its research and development efforts. Other rockets include the VSB-30, designed by the Institute of Aeronautics and Space (IAE), and the PESL rocket, created by the startup PION Labs.
- The Paulet I rocket was built and launched in Peru by The National Commission for Aerospace Research and Development (CONIDA) on 2006, becoming the first sounding rocket of the country and the third rocket in South America, after those from Brazil and Argentina.
- The Experimental Sounding Rocket Association (ESRA) is a non-profit organization based in the United States that has operated the Intercollegiate Rocket Engineering Competition (IREC) since 2006.
- The Latin American Space Challenge (LASC) is an international competition held in Brazil, focused on launching student-developed sounding rockets and experimental satellites. Since 2019, the event has attracted student-led teams from Latin American countries, as well as Turkey and Taiwan, to launch their projects.
- ONERA in France launched a sounding rocket named Titus, developed for observation of the total solar eclipse in Argentina on November 12, 1966. Titus was a two-stage rocket with a length of 11.5 m (38 ft), a launch weight of 3.4 t (7,500 lb), and a diameter of 56 cm (22 in). It reached a maximum height of 270 km (170 mi). It was launched twice in Las Palmas, Chaco during the eclipse, in collaboration with the Argentine space agency CNIE.
- German Aerospace Center's Mobile Rocket Base (DLR MORABA) designs, builds and operates a variety of sounding rocket types and custom vehicles in support for national and international research programs.
- The Indian aerospace company Skyroot Aerospace launched Vikram S sounding rocket on 18 November 2022 and became the first private entity in India to achieve the mark.
- The Agnibaan SOrTeD was launched by AgniKul Cosmos on 30 May 2024 from Sriharikota. The Indian company launched the world's first rocket with a single piece 3D printed rocket engine.
- Interstellar Technologies is a Japanese company that is developing the experimental MOMO sounding rocket.

== See also ==
- Delft Aerospace Rocket Engineering
- Frank Malina
- High Power Rocketry
- List of sounding rockets
- Model rocket
- Project HARP
- Rocket Lab
